= List of Milan S Lines stations =

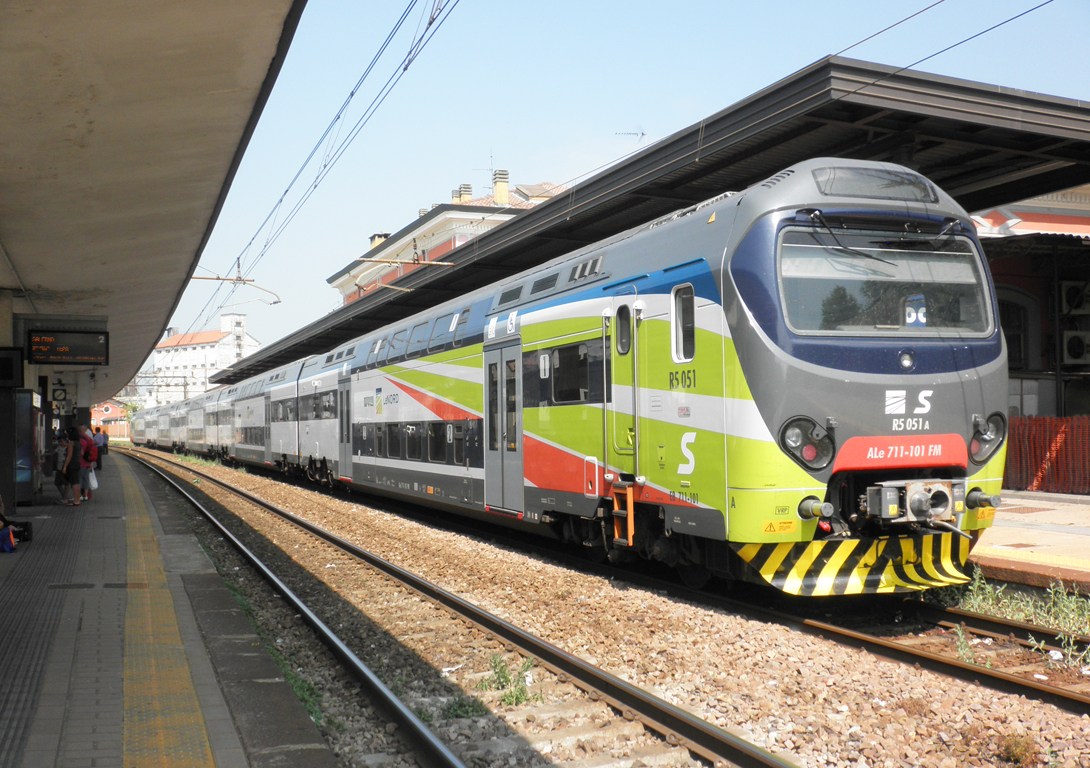
A S1 line train at Lodi

Milan suburban railway network map

The Milan S Lines is a commuter rail system serving the metropolitan area of Milan, Italy.

The system comprises 13 lines serving 124 stations, for a total length of 403 km and is fully integrated with the Milan Metro. There are 732 rides per day with a daily ridership of about 230,000. The network works like a rapid transit system when entering the city center through the Milan Passante, where more lines share the same tracks, considerably decreasing headways. Lines also share tracks in other sections, outside of the Milan Passante and outside of the city of Milan, too, like between Milano Bovisa and Saronno, Milano Forlanini and Pioltello-Limito or Milano Certosa and Rho.

== List of stations ==
Legend
	Milan Metro lines
Line S1 (Milan suburban railway service) Line S2 (Milan suburban railway service) Line S3 (Milan suburban railway service) Line S4 (Milan suburban railway service) Line S5 (Milan suburban railway service) Line S6 (Milan suburban railway service) Line S7 (Milan suburban railway service) Line S8 (Milan suburban railway service) Line S9 (Milan suburban railway service) Line S11 (Milan suburban railway service) Line S12 (Milan suburban railway service) Line S13 (Milan suburban railway service) Line S19 (Milan suburban railway service)	Suburban railway lines
	Connection with regional railway network
	Connection with long-distance railway network
Switzerland	Connection with TILO regional services
MXP	Malpensa Express service to Malpensa Airport

Stations in light-blue background are part of the Milan Passante railway.

Station	Owner	Lines	Interchanges	Opened	Ridership	Municipality
Airuno	RFI	Line S8 (Milan suburban railway service)		2009		Airuno
Albairate-Vermezzo	RFI	Line S9 (Milan suburban railway service) Line S19 (Milan suburban railway service)		2011		Albairate
Albizzate-Solbiate Arno	RFI	Line S5 (Milan suburban railway service)		2004		Albizzate
Arcore	RFI	Line S8 (Milan suburban railway service)		2009		Arcore
Besana	RFI	Line S7 (Milan suburban railway service)		2014		Besana in Brianza
Biassono-Lesmo Parco	RFI	Line S7 (Milan suburban railway service)		2014		Biassono
Bollate Centro	FN	Line S1 (Milan suburban railway service) Line S3 (Milan suburban railway service) Line S13 (Milan suburban railway service)		2004		Bollate
Bollate Nord	FN	Line S1 (Milan suburban railway service) Line S3 (Milan suburban railway service) Line S13 (Milan suburban railway service)		2004		Bollate
Borgolombardo	RFI	Line S1 (Milan suburban railway service) Line S12 (Milan suburban railway service)		2009		San Donato Milanese
Bovisio Masciago-Mombello	FN	Line S2 (Milan suburban railway service) Line S4 (Milan suburban railway service)		2004		Bovisio Masciago
Busto Arsizio	RFI	Line S5 (Milan suburban railway service)	Switzerland	2004		Busto Arsizio
Buttafava	RFI	Line S7 (Milan suburban railway service)		2014		Arcore
Calolziocorte	RFI	Line S8 (Milan suburban railway service)		2009		Calolziocorte
Camnago-Lentate	RFI	Line S4 (Milan suburban railway service) Line S11 (Milan suburban railway service)		2006		Lentate sul Seveso
Canegrate	RFI	Line S5 (Milan suburban railway service)		2004		Canegrate
Cantù-Cermenate	RFI	Line S11 (Milan suburban railway service)		2008		Cantù
Carate-Calò	RFI	Line S7 (Milan suburban railway service)		2014		Carate Brianza
Carimate	RFI	Line S11 (Milan suburban railway service)		2008		Carimate
Carnate-Usmate	RFI	Line S8 (Milan suburban railway service)		2009		Carnate
Caronno Pertusella	FN	Line S1 (Milan suburban railway service) Line S3 (Milan suburban railway service)		2004		Caronno Pertusella
Cassago-Nibionno-Bulciago	RFI	Line S7 (Milan suburban railway service)		2014		Cassago Brianza
Cassano d'Adda	RFI	Line S5 (Milan suburban railway service) Line S6 (Milan suburban railway service)		2009		Cassano d'Adda
Castronno	RFI	Line S5 (Milan suburban railway service)		2004		Castronno
Cavaria-Oggiona-Jerago	RFI	Line S5 (Milan suburban railway service)		2004		Cavaria con Premezzo
Ceriano Laghetto-Solaro	FN	Line S9 (Milan suburban railway service)		2012		Ceriano Laghetto
Cernusco-Merate	RFI	Line S8 (Milan suburban railway service)		2009		Cernusco Lombardone
Certosa di Pavia	RFI	Line S13 (Milan suburban railway service)		2011		Giussago
Cesano Boscone	RFI	Line S9 (Milan suburban railway service)		2011		Cesano Boscone
Cesano Maderno	FN	Line S2 (Milan suburban railway service) Line S4 (Milan suburban railway service) Line S9 (Milan suburban railway service)		2011		Cesano Maderno
Cesate	FN	Line S1 (Milan suburban railway service) Line S3 (Milan suburban railway service)		2004		Cesate
Chiasso	SBB-CFF-FFS	Line S11 (Milan suburban railway service)	Switzerland	2008		Chiasso
Civate	RFI	Line S7 (Milan suburban railway service)		2014		Civate
Como Camerlata	RFI	Line S11 (Milan suburban railway service)		2021		Como
Como San Giovanni	RFI	Line S11 (Milan suburban railway service)		2008		Como
Corbetta-Santo Stefano Ticino	RFI	Line S6 (Milan suburban railway service)		2004		Corbetta
Cormano-Cusano Milanino	FN	Line S2 (Milan suburban railway service) Line S4 (Milan suburban railway service) Line S12 (Milan suburban railway service)		2015		Cormano
Corsico	RFI	Line S9 (Milan suburban railway service) Line S19 (Milan suburban railway service)		2011		Corsico
Costa Masnaga	RFI	Line S7 (Milan suburban railway service)		2014		Costa Masnaga
Cucciago	RFI	Line S11 (Milan suburban railway service)		2008		Cucciago
Desio	RFI	Line S9 (Milan suburban railway service) Line S11 (Milan suburban railway service)		2008		Desio
Gaggiano	RFI	Line S9 (Milan suburban railway service) Line S19 (Milan suburban railway service)		2011		Gaggiano
Gallarate	RFI	Line S5 (Milan suburban railway service)	Switzerland	2004	6.8	Gallarate
Garbagnate Milanese	FN	Line S1 (Milan suburban railway service) Line S3 (Milan suburban railway service) Line S13 (Milan suburban railway service)		2004		Garbagnate Milanese
Garbagnate Parco delle Groane	FN	Line S1 (Milan suburban railway service) Line S3 (Milan suburban railway service) Line S13 (Milan suburban railway service)		2004		Garbagnate Milanese
Gazzada-Schianno-Morazzone	RFI	Line S5 (Milan suburban railway service)		2004		Morazzone
Lecco	RFI	Line S7 (Milan suburban railway service) Line S8 (Milan suburban railway service)		2009	7	Lecco
Lecco Maggianico	RFI	Line S8 (Milan suburban railway service)		2009		Lecco
Legnano	RFI	Line S5 (Milan suburban railway service)		2004		Legnano
Lissone-Muggiò	RFI	Line S9 (Milan suburban railway service) Line S11 (Milan suburban railway service)		2004		Lissone
Locate Triulzi	RFI	Line S13 (Milan suburban railway service)		2011		Locate di Triulzi
Lodi	RFI	Line S1 (Milan suburban railway service)		2009	4	Lodi
Macherio-Canonica	RFI	Line S7 (Milan suburban railway service)		2014		Macherio
Magenta	RFI	Line S6 (Milan suburban railway service)		2004		Magenta
Meda	FN	Line S2 (Milan suburban railway service)		2004		Meda
Melegnano	RFI	Line S1 (Milan suburban railway service) Line S12 (Milan suburban railway service)		2009		Melegnano
Melzo	RFI	Line S5 (Milan suburban railway service) Line S6 (Milan suburban railway service)		2009		Melzo
Milano Affori	FN	Line S2 (Milan suburban railway service) Line S4 (Milan suburban railway service) Line S12 (Milan suburban railway service)		2011		Milan
Milano Bovisa	FN	Line S1 (Milan suburban railway service) Line S2 (Milan suburban railway service) Line S3 (Milan suburban railway service) Line S4 (Milan suburban railway service) Line S12 (Milan suburban railway service) Line S13 (Milan suburban railway service)	MXP	2004		Milan
Milano Bruzzano	FN	Line S2 (Milan suburban railway service) Line S4 (Milan suburban railway service) Line S12 (Milan suburban railway service)		2014		Milan
Milano Cadorna	FN	Line S3 (Milan suburban railway service) Line S4 (Milan suburban railway service)	MXP	2004	33.1	Milan
Milano Certosa	RFI	Line S5 (Milan suburban railway service) Line S6 (Milan suburban railway service) Line S11 (Milan suburban railway service)		2004		Milan
Milano Dateo	RFI	Line S1 (Milan suburban railway service) Line S2 (Milan suburban railway service) Line S5 (Milan suburban railway service) Line S6 (Milan suburban railway service) Line S12 (Milan suburban railway service) Line S13 (Milan suburban railway service)		2004		Milan
Milano Domodossola	FN	Line S3 (Milan suburban railway service) Line S4 (Milan suburban railway service)		2004		Milan
Milano Forlanini	RFI	Line S5 (Milan suburban railway service) Line S6 (Milan suburban railway service) Line S9 (Milan suburban railway service)		2015		Milan
Milano Greco Pirelli	RFI	Line S7 (Milan suburban railway service) Line S8 (Milan suburban railway service) Line S9 (Milan suburban railway service) Line S11 (Milan suburban railway service)		2004		Milan
Milano Lambrate	RFI	Line S9 (Milan suburban railway service)		2004		Milan
Milano Lancetti	RFI	Line S1 (Milan suburban railway service) Line S2 (Milan suburban railway service) Line S5 (Milan suburban railway service) Line S6 (Milan suburban railway service) Line S12 (Milan suburban railway service) Line S13 (Milan suburban railway service)		2004		Milan
Milano Porta Garibaldi	RFI	Line S1 (Milan suburban railway service) Line S2 (Milan suburban railway service) Line S5 (Milan suburban railway service) Line S6 (Milan suburban railway service) Line S7 (Milan suburban railway service) Line S8 (Milan suburban railway service) Line S11 (Milan suburban railway service) Line S12 (Milan suburban railway service) Line S13 (Milan suburban railway service)	MXP	2004	23	Milan
Milano Porta Venezia	RFI	Line S1 (Milan suburban railway service) Line S2 (Milan suburban railway service) Line S5 (Milan suburban railway service) Line S6 (Milan suburban railway service) Line S12 (Milan suburban railway service) Line S13 (Milan suburban railway service)		2004		Milan
Milano Porta Vittoria	RFI	Line S1 (Milan suburban railway service) Line S2 (Milan suburban railway service) Line S5 (Milan suburban railway service) Line S6 (Milan suburban railway service) Line S12 (Milan suburban railway service) Line S13 (Milan suburban railway service)		2004		Milan
Milano Quarto Oggiaro	FN	Line S1 (Milan suburban railway service) Line S3 (Milan suburban railway service) Line S13 (Milan suburban railway service)		2004		Milan
Milano Repubblica	RFI	Line S1 (Milan suburban railway service) Line S2 (Milan suburban railway service) Line S5 (Milan suburban railway service) Line S6 (Milan suburban railway service) Line S12 (Milan suburban railway service) Line S13 (Milan suburban railway service)		2004		Milan
Milano Rogoredo	RFI	Line S1 (Milan suburban railway service) Line S2 (Milan suburban railway service) Line S12 (Milan suburban railway service) Line S13 (Milan suburban railway service) Line S19 (Milan suburban railway service)		2008		Milan
Milano Romolo	RFI	Line S9 (Milan suburban railway service) Line S19 (Milan suburban railway service)		2006		Milan
Milano San Cristoforo	RFI	Line S9 (Milan suburban railway service) Line S19 (Milan suburban railway service)		2004		Milan
Milano Scalo Romana	RFI	Line S9 (Milan suburban railway service) Line S19 (Milan suburban railway service)		2004		Milan
Milano Tibaldi	RFI	Line S9 (Milan suburban railway service) Line S19 (Milan suburban railway service)		2022		Milan
Milano Villapizzone	RFI	Line S5 (Milan suburban railway service) Line S6 (Milan suburban railway service) Line S11 (Milan suburban railway service)		2004		Milan
Molteno	RFI	Line S7 (Milan suburban railway service)		2014		Molteno
Monza	RFI	Line S7 (Milan suburban railway service) Line S8 (Milan suburban railway service) Line S9 (Milan suburban railway service) Line S11 (Milan suburban railway service)		2004	7	Monza
Monza Sobborghi	RFI	Line S7 (Milan suburban railway service)		2014		Monza
Novara	RFI	Line S6 (Milan suburban railway service)		2004		Novara
Novate Milanese	FN	Line S1 (Milan suburban railway service) Line S3 (Milan suburban railway service) Line S13 (Milan suburban railway service)		2004		Novate Milanese
Oggiono	RFI	Line S7 (Milan suburban railway service)		2014		Oggiono
Olgiate-Calco-Brivio	RFI	Line S8 (Milan suburban railway service)		2009		Olgiate Molgora
Osnago	RFI	Line S8 (Milan suburban railway service)		2009		Osnago
Paderno Dugnano	FN	Line S2 (Milan suburban railway service) Line S4 (Milan suburban railway service)		2004		Paderno Dugnano
Palazzolo Milanese	FN	Line S2 (Milan suburban railway service) Line S4 (Milan suburban railway service)		2004		Paderno Dugnano
Parabiago	RFI	Line S5 (Milan suburban railway service)		2004		Parabiago
Pavia	RFI	Line S13 (Milan suburban railway service)		2011	8.7	Pavia
Pieve Emanuele	RFI	Line S13 (Milan suburban railway service)		2013		Pieve Emanuele
Pioltello-Limito	RFI	Line S5 (Milan suburban railway service) Line S6 (Milan suburban railway service)		2004		Pioltello
Pozzuolo Martesana	RFI	Line S5 (Milan suburban railway service) Line S6 (Milan suburban railway service)		2009		Pozzuolo Martesana
Pregnana Milanese	RFI	Line S6 (Milan suburban railway service)		2009		Pregnana Milanese
Renate-Veduggio	RFI	Line S7 (Milan suburban railway service)		2014		Renate
Rho	RFI	Line S5 (Milan suburban railway service) Line S6 (Milan suburban railway service) Line S11 (Milan suburban railway service)		2004		Rho
Rho Fiera	RFI	Line S5 (Milan suburban railway service) Line S6 (Milan suburban railway service) Line S11 (Milan suburban railway service)		2009		Rho
Sala al Barro-Galbiate	RFI	Line S7 (Milan suburban railway service)		2014		Galbiate
San Donato Milanese	RFI	Line S1 (Milan suburban railway service) Line S12 (Milan suburban railway service)		2009		San Donato Milanese
San Giuliano Milanese	RFI	Line S1 (Milan suburban railway service) Line S12 (Milan suburban railway service)		2009		San Giuliano Milanese
San Zenone al Lambro	RFI	Line S1 (Milan suburban railway service)		2009		San Zenone al Lambro
Saronno	FN	Line S1 (Milan suburban railway service) Line S3 (Milan suburban railway service) Line S9 (Milan suburban railway service)	MXP	2004	6.2	Saronno
Saronno Sud	FN	Line S1 (Milan suburban railway service) Line S3 (Milan suburban railway service) Line S9 (Milan suburban railway service)		2004		Saronno
Segrate	RFI	Line S5 (Milan suburban railway service) Line S6 (Milan suburban railway service)		2004		Segrate
Seregno	RFI	Line S9 (Milan suburban railway service) Line S11 (Milan suburban railway service)		2004		Seregno
Sesto San Giovanni	RFI	Line S7 (Milan suburban railway service) Line S8 (Milan suburban railway service) Line S9 (Milan suburban railway service) Line S11 (Milan suburban railway service)		2004		Sesto San Giovanni
Seveso	FN	Line S2 (Milan suburban railway service) Line S4 (Milan suburban railway service)		2004		Seveso
Seveso-Baruccana	FN	Line S9 (Milan suburban railway service)		2012		Seveso
Tavazzano	RFI	Line S1 (Milan suburban railway service)		2009		Tavazzano con Villavesco
Trecate	RFI	Line S6 (Milan suburban railway service)		2004		Trecate
Trecella	RFI	Line S5 (Milan suburban railway service) Line S6 (Milan suburban railway service)		2009		Pozzuolo Martesana
Treviglio	RFI	Line S5 (Milan suburban railway service) Line S6 (Milan suburban railway service)		2009	3.5	Treviglio
Trezzano sul Naviglio	RFI	Line S9 (Milan suburban railway service) Line S19 (Milan suburban railway service)		2011		Trezzano sul Naviglio
Triuggio-Ponte Albiate	RFI	Line S7 (Milan suburban railway service)		2014		Triuggio
Valmadrera	RFI	Line S7 (Milan suburban railway service)		2014		Valmadrera
Vanzago-Pogliano	RFI	Line S5 (Milan suburban railway service)		2004		Vanzago
Varedo	FN	Line S2 (Milan suburban railway service) Line S4 (Milan suburban railway service)		2004		Varedo
Varese	RFI	Line S5 (Milan suburban railway service)		2004		Varese
Vercurago-San Girolamo	RFI	Line S8 (Milan suburban railway service)				Vercurago
Vignate	RFI	Line S5 (Milan suburban railway service) Line S6 (Milan suburban railway service)		2009		Vignate
Villa Raverio	RFI	Line S7 (Milan suburban railway service)		2014		Besana in Brianza
Villamaggiore	RFI	Line S13 (Milan suburban railway service)		2011		Lacchiarella
Villasanta Parco	RFI	Line S7 (Milan suburban railway service)		2014		Villasanta
Vittuone-Arluno	RFI	Line S6 (Milan suburban railway service)		2004		Vittuone

== See also ==
- Milan Metro
- List of Milan Metro stations
- Milan S Lines
