= Line S7 (Milan suburban railway service) =

Railway line in Milan, Italy

Lecco–Milano Porta Garibaldi
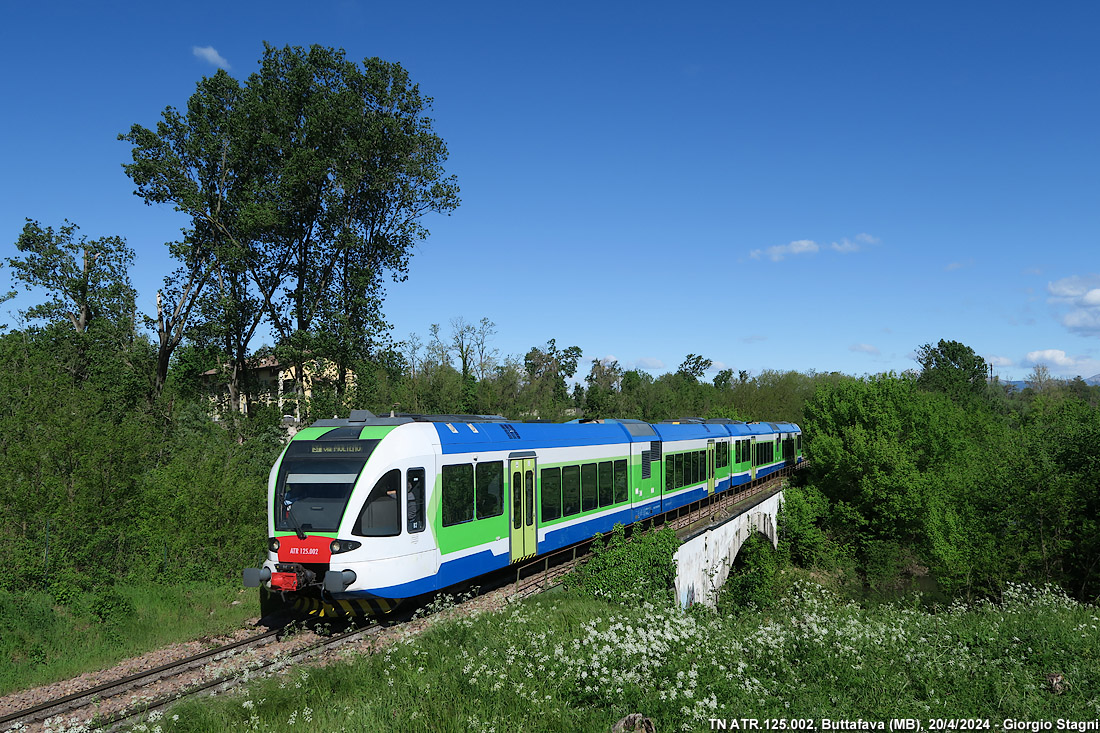
- An S7 train near Buttafava

Overview
- Status: Operating
- Locale: Milan metropolitan area, Italy
- Termini: Lecco; Milano Porta Garibaldi
- Stations: 22
- Website: Trenord (in Italian)

Service
- Type: Commuter rail
- System: Milan suburban railway service
- Route number: S7
- Operator(s): Trenord
- Rolling stock: ATR 125

History
- Opened: 14 December 2014

Technical
- Line length: 56 km (35 mi)
- Track gauge: 1,435 mm (4 ft 8 1/2 in)
- Electrification: 3000 V DC (only on the section Milano-Monza)
Route map
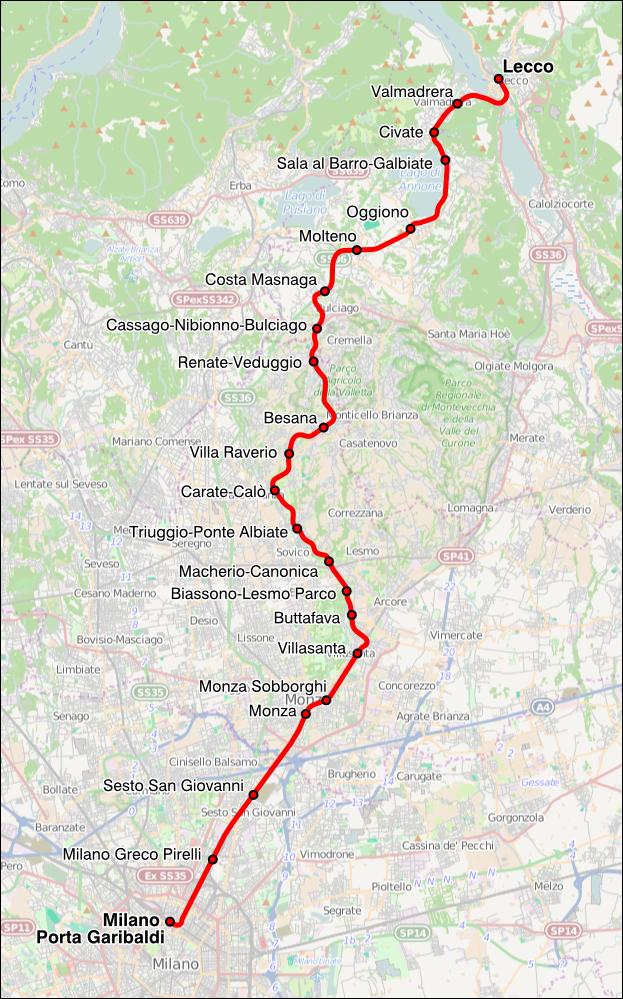

The line S7 (Italian: Linea S7) is a commuter rail route forming part of the Milan suburban railway service (Italian: Servizio ferroviario suburbano di Milano), which converges on the city of Milan, Italy.

The route runs over the infrastructure of the Milan–Monza and the Monza–Molteno railways and the section from Molteno to Lecco, opened on 20 November 1888, of the Como–Lecco railway. In the section from Molteno to Lecco it is also present another regional service train connecting Como and Lecco. Like all the other Milan suburban railway service routes, it is operated by Trenord.

== Route ==
- Milano Porta Garibaldi ↔ Molteno ↔ Lecco

Line S7, a radial route, heads initially in an northeasterly direction from Milan to Monza. From there, after Villasanta it turns north-west - away from the main railway to Lecco/Bergamo - and then, after Carate, turns north-east to Lecco. The travel takes 1h36'.

== History ==
The route was activated on 14 December 2014, substituting the former R19 regional service. It is the sole line of the suburban service which runs on a section with a single track without electrification (line S9 also runs on a minor single track section, though it is completely electrified), so it is the sole line with a single ride per hour, running half-hourly only in peak hours and in the peak direction (Milan in the morning, Lecco in the evening).

== Stations ==
The stations on the S7 are as follows (stations with a coloured background are within the municipality of Milan):

Station	Opened	Interchange	Note
Milano Porta Garibaldi	1963	MXP	
Milano Greco Pirelli	1914	Line S11 Treni regionali	
Sesto San Giovanni	1969	Line M1 Treni regionali Line S11	
Monza	1840	Line S11 Treni regionali	
Monza Sobborghi	1911		
Villasanta Parco	1911		
Buttafava (Arcore west-side)	1911		
Biassono-Lesmo Parco	1911		
Macherio-Canonica	1911		
Triuggio-Ponte Albiate	1911		
Carate-Calò	1911		
Villa Raverio	1911		
Besana	1911		
Renate-Veduggio	1911		
Cassago-Nibionno-Bulciago	1911		
Costa Masnaga	1911		
Molteno	1888	Treni regionali	
Oggiono	1888	Treni regionali	
Sala al Barro-Galbiate	1888		
Civate	1888		
Valmadrera	1888	Treni regionali	
Lecco	1863	Treni regionali	

== See also ==
- History of rail transport in Italy
- List of Milan suburban railway stations
- Rail transport in Italy
- Transport in Milan
