= Villasanta Parco railway station =

Railway station in Italy

Villasanta
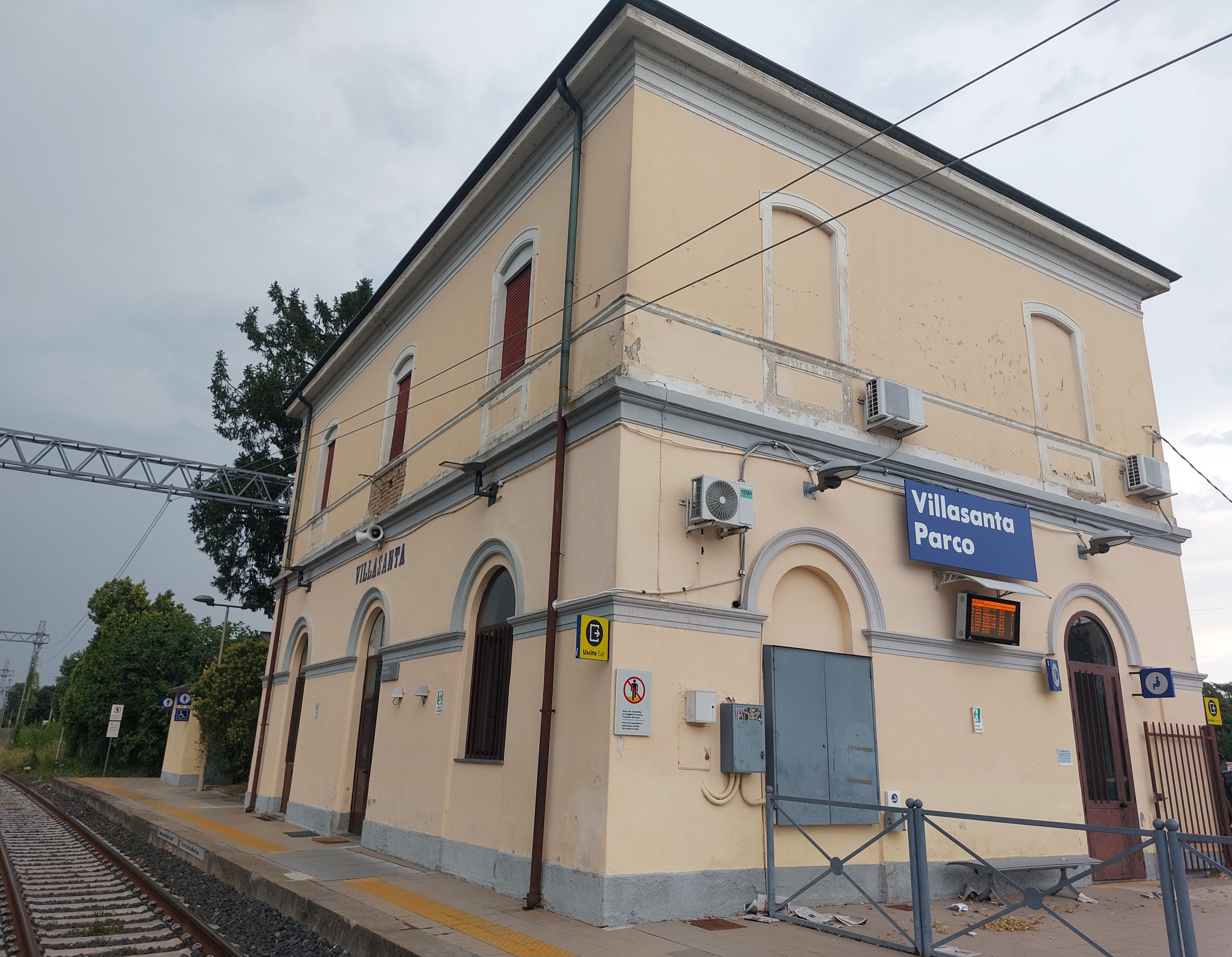

General information
- Location: Villasanta, Monza, Lombardy; Italy
- Coordinates: 45°36′12″N 09°18′18″E
- Operator: Rete Ferroviaria Italiana
- Line: Monza–Molteno
- Distance: 3.911 km (2.430 mi) from Monza
- Platforms: 1
- Tracks: 2
- Train operators: Trenord

Other information
- Fare zone: STIBM: Mi5
- Classification: Bronze

Services
Preceding station	Trenord	Following station
Monza Sobborghi towards Milano Porta Garibaldi	Line S7 (Milan suburban railway service)	Buttafava towards Lecco
S8 does not stop here
Location
- Location within Lombardy Location within Northern Italy Location within Italy

Villasanta Parco railway station is a railway station in Italy. Located on the Monza–Molteno railway, it serves the municipality of Villasanta in Lombardy. The train services are operated by Trenord. The original name was La Santa-Villa San Fiorano.

Until 11 December 2022 it was called "Villasanta".

== Train services ==
The station is served by the following service(s):

- Milan Metropolitan services (S7) Milan - Molteno - Lecco

== Monza Park ==
The station is located near the "Porta di Villasanta" entrance to Monza Park (street Viale Cavriga). The park can also be reached on foot via a route of approximately 900 metres through the town, using the stairs of the Via Matteotti road underpass, located about 230 metres south of the station along the railway line.

== See also ==
- Milan suburban railway network
