= Arcore railway station =

Railway station in Italy

Arcore
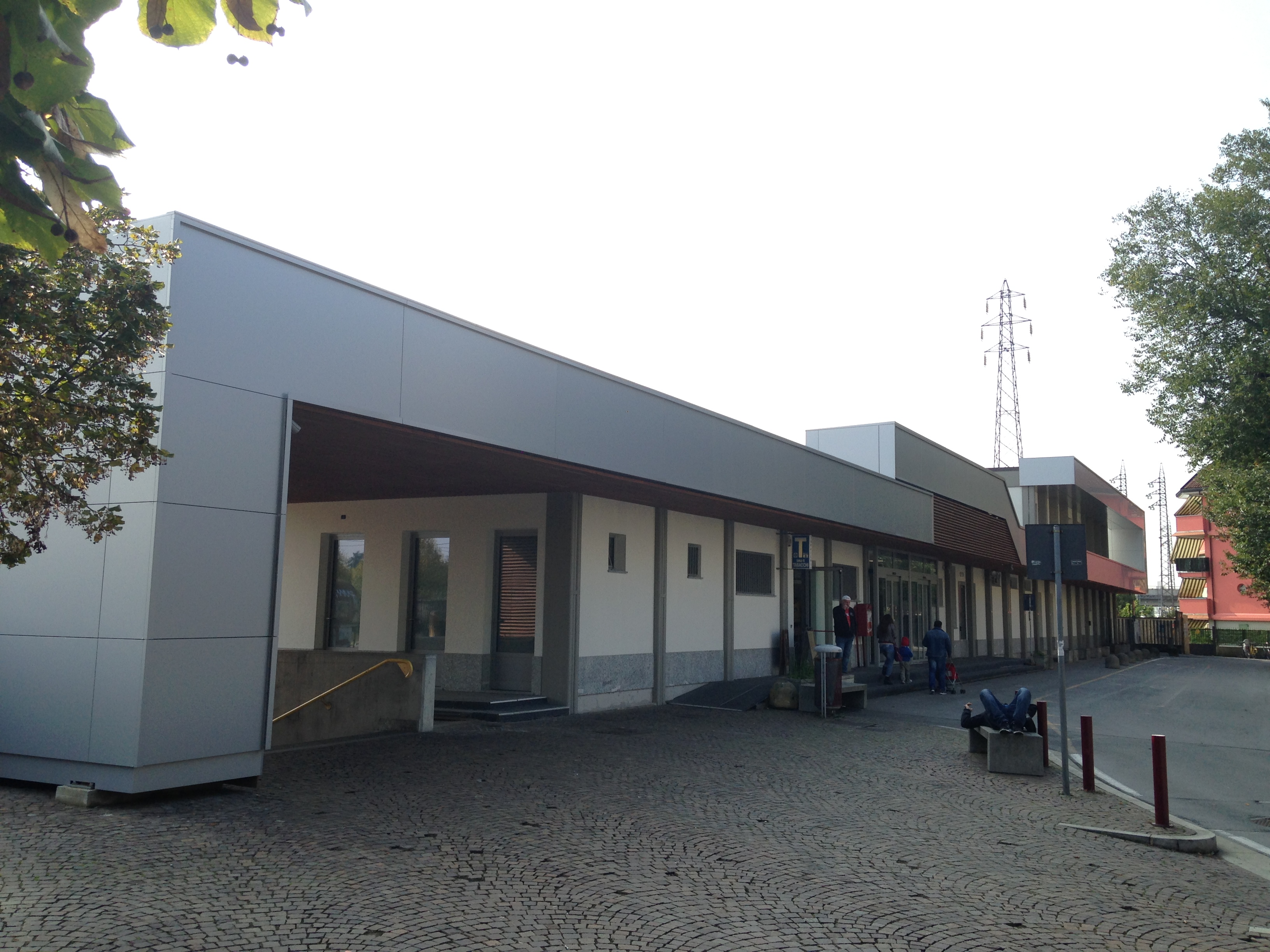

General information
- Location: Piazza Martiri della Libertà (Via Roma); Arcore, Monza and Brianza, Lombardy; Italy
- Coordinates: 45°37′25.5″N 09°19′22.5″E
- Operator: Rete Ferroviaria Italiana
- Line: Lecco–Milan
- Distance: 6.558 km (4.075 mi) from Monza
- Platforms: 2
- Tracks: 2
- Train operators: Trenord

Other information
- Fare zone: STIBM: Mi5
- Classification: Silver

History
- Opened: 27 December 1873; 152 years ago
- Rebuilt: 1984; 42 years ago

Services
| Preceding station | Trenord | Following station |
|---|---|---|
| Monza towards Milano Porta Garibaldi | Line S8 (Milan suburban railway service) | Carnate–Usmate towards Lecco |
Location
- Location within Lombardy Location within Northern Italy Location within Italy

Arcore railway station is a railway station in Italy. Located on the Lecco–Milan railway, it serves the municipality of Arcore with trains from and to Monza–Milan or Lecco ("S8", main service), and Bergamo (regional trains, "R").

A second station - of a different railway line, the Monza-Molteno-Lecco railway - is present in Arcore, located in Ca' Bianca-Buttafava area (Buttafava railway station, of "S7" line of Milan suburban railway service), with trains from and to Monza–Milan or Lecco, but running through a more long and slow way than the trains of the main Arcore station (across the brianza hills zone - Colli Briantei - instead than straight to Lecco through the most short way).

== Ticket office ==
A ticket office and a self-service machine is present in main Arcore station (Not at Buttafava station).

When the ticket office is closed, if self-service machine is out of service and no other kind of Trenord authorised resellers is open around 200 meter from the station, ticket can be purchased aboard of the train, asking soon for this just when goin aboard to the "chief train" (Italian: CapoTreno); otherwise you have to pay surcharge and/or mulct.

The most part of the tickets require to be validated just some minutes before to go aboard the train, doing this by electronic machines validation (blue colored, for small Magneto-Electronic SBME paper tickets) or mechanics machine validation (yellow colored, for the 5 kind of normal paper tickets: ATB Ticket, Trenord, Lottomatica, Sisal and S.I.R.), both located in the station (3 blue and 2 yellow); this will start the countdown for expiration of the ticket, by stamping current date, time, location/validation-machine-id on it, and in case also reading and recording information on magnetic data strip of SBME tickets. If all the machines validation you need are out of service, ask for validation to the ticket office; if the ticket office is close, ask soon for validation to "chief train" when aboard.

All the kind of trains stopping in Arcore stations ("R", "S7", "S8") can be used with single journey ticket train or a lot of multi pass ticket, only train or integrated tickets, up to the integrated regional ticket "Io Viaggio Ovunque in Lombardia" for multi-journeys on the entire local public transport network in the region of Lombardy.

== Interchange ==
The station offers interchange with bus, mainly to and from Monza, Oggiono, Vimercate.

== See also ==
- Milan suburban railway service
