= Buttafava railway station =

Railway station

Buttafava
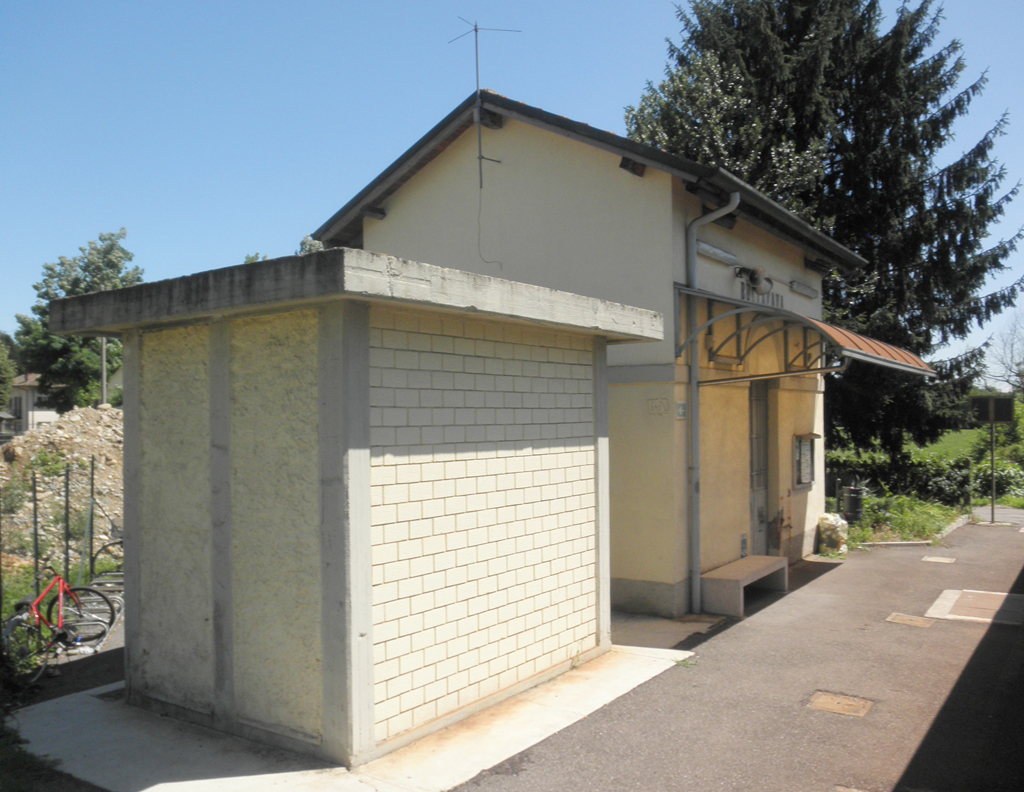

General information
- Location: Arcore, Monza, Lombardy; Italy
- Coordinates: 45°37′17″N 09°18′05″E
- Operator: Rete Ferroviaria Italiana
- Line: Monza–Molteno
- Distance: 6.393 km (3.972 mi) from Monza
- Platforms: 1
- Tracks: 1
- Train operators: Trenord

Other information
- Fare zone: STIBM: Mi5
- Classification: Bronze

Services
Preceding station	Trenord	Following station
Villasanta Parco towards Milano Porta Garibaldi	Line S7 (Milan suburban railway service)	Biassono–Lesmo Parco towards Lecco
Location
- Location within Lombardy Location within Northern Italy Location within Italy

Buttafava railway station is a railway station in Italy. Located on the Monza–Molteno railway, it serves the municipality of Arcore in Lombardy as its secondary station. The train services are operated by Trenord.

== Train services ==
The station is served by the following service(s):

- Milan Metropolitan services (S7) Milan - Molteno - Lecco

== See also ==
- Milan suburban railway network
- Arcore railway station
