= Macherio–Canonica railway station =

Railway station in Italy

Macherio–Canonica
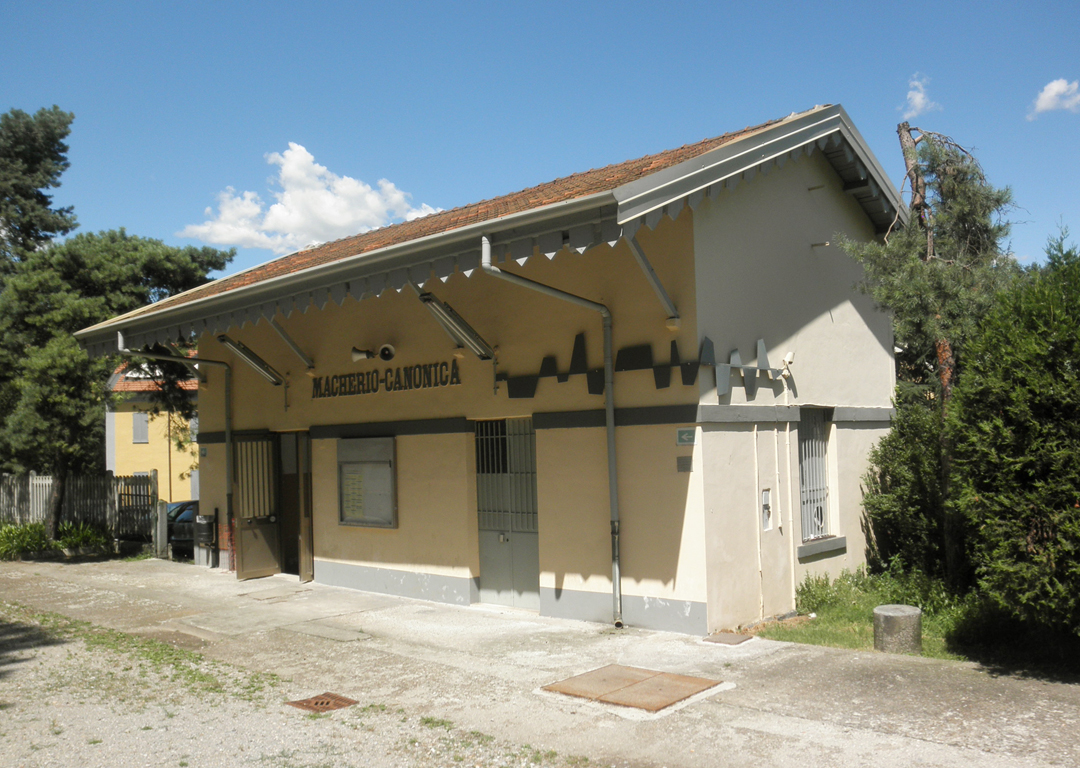

General information
- Location: Macherio, Monza, Lombardy; Italy
- Coordinates: 45°38′44″N 09°17′12″E
- Operator: Rete Ferroviaria Italiana
- Line: Monza–Molteno
- Distance: 9.383 km (5.830 mi) from Monza
- Platforms: 1
- Tracks: 1
- Train operators: Trenord

Other information
- Fare zone: STIBM: Mi5
- Classification: Bronze

Services
Preceding station	Trenord	Following station
Biassono–Lesmo Parco towards Milano Porta Garibaldi	Line S7 (Milan suburban railway service)	Triuggio–Ponte Albiate towards Lecco
Location
- Location within Lombardy Location within Northern Italy Location within Italy

Macherio–Canonica railway station is a railway station in Italy. Located on the Monza–Molteno railway, it serves the municipality of Macherio in Lombardy as its secondary station. The train services are operated by Trenord.

== Train services ==
The station is served by the following service(s):

- Milan Metropolitan services (S7) Milan - Molteno - Lecco

== See also ==
- Milan suburban railway network
