= Giuseppe Balzaretto =

Italian architect (1801–1874)

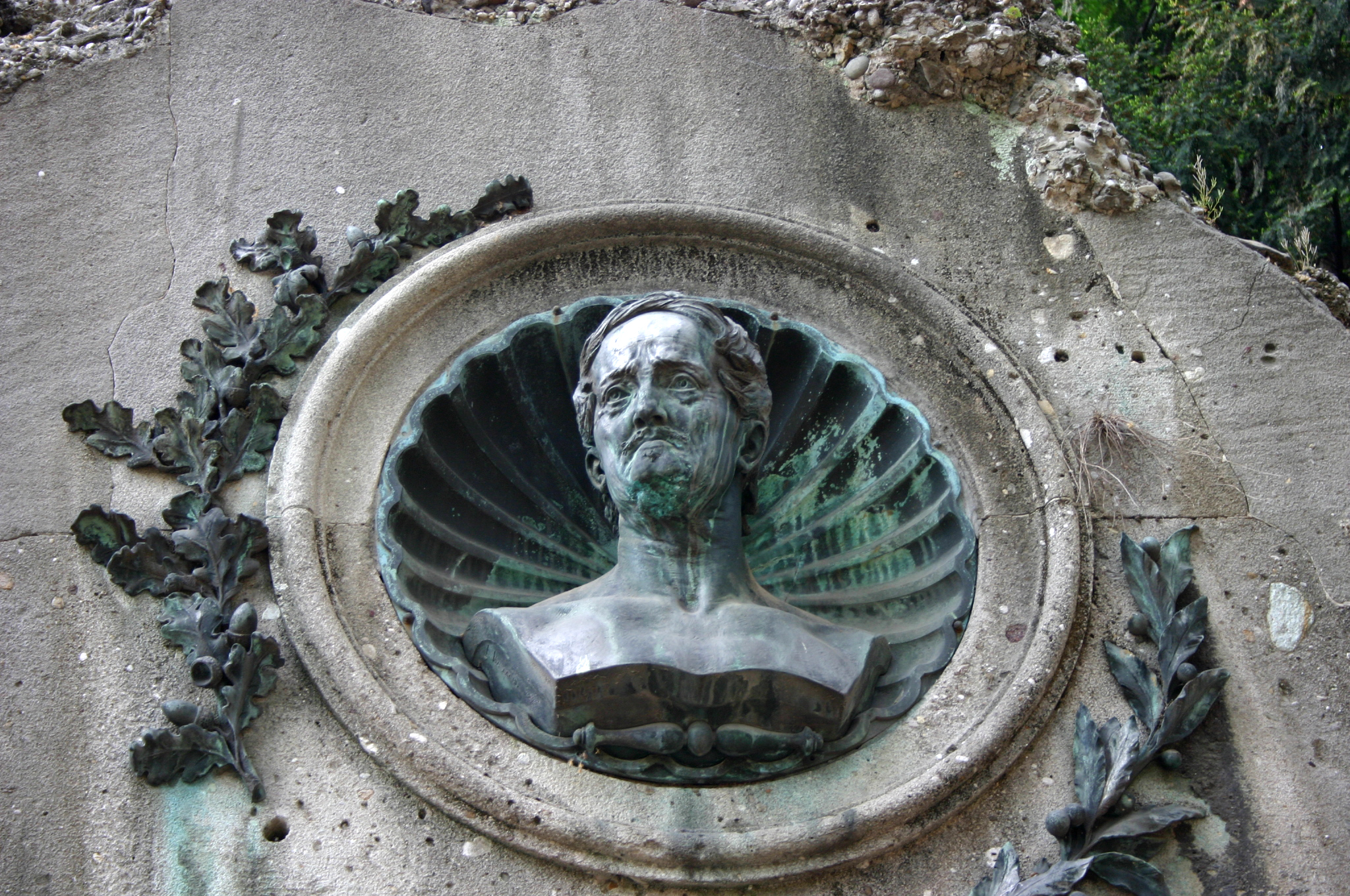
Bust of Giuseppe Balzaretto, dedicated in 1876, in the Public Garden Indro Montanelli in Milan.

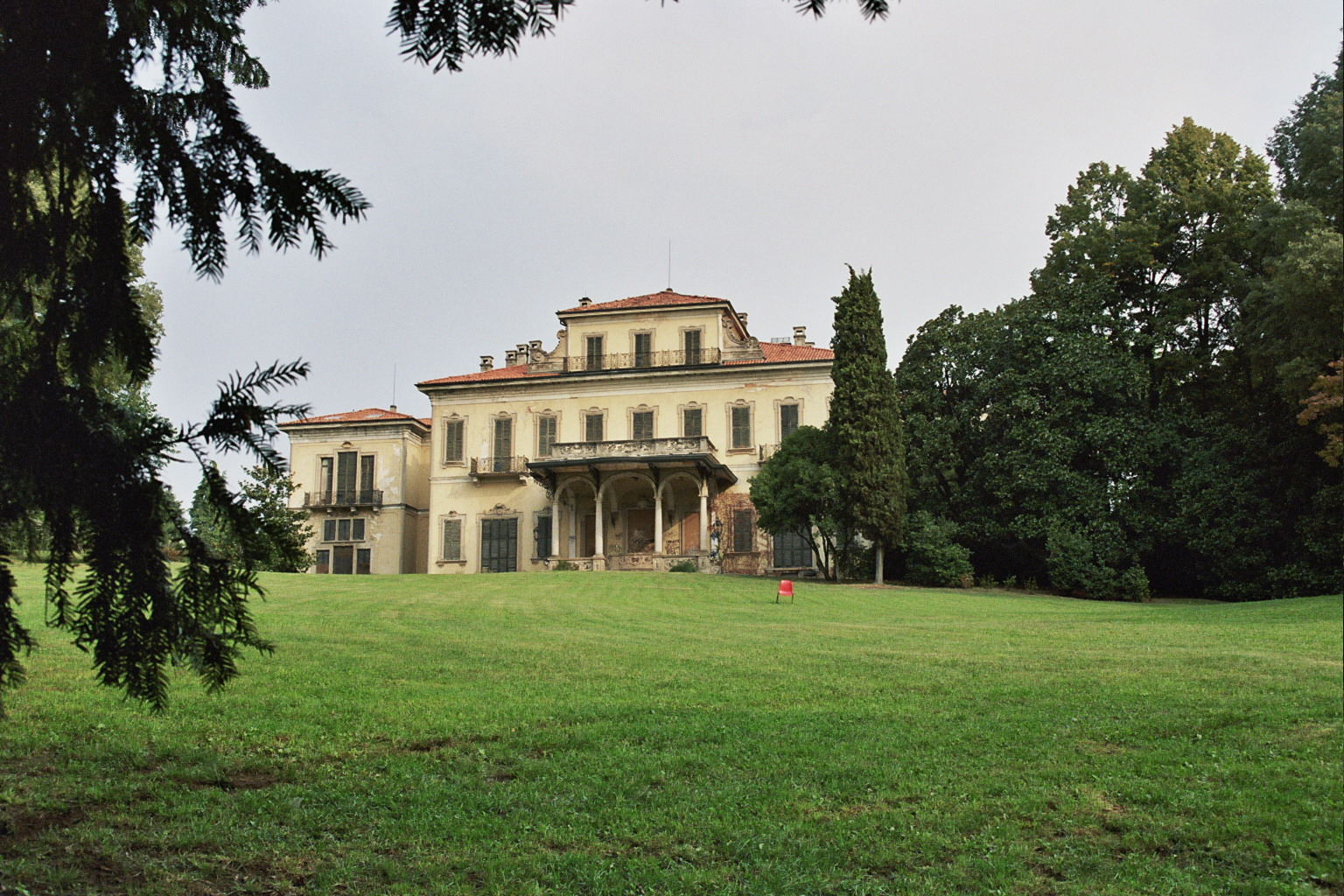
Villa Borromeo d'Adda in Arcore.

Giuseppe Balzaretto or Balzaretti (19 January 1801 – 30 April 1874) was an Italian landscape architect and architect.

== Career ==
Balzaretto studied mathematics at the University of Pavia, but became interested in villa architectures and gardens. Among his initial projects were the gardens at the Villa Borromeo d'Adda in Arcore. As an architect, he helped refurbish the palace now housing the Poldi Pezzoli in Milan.

In 1858, he was commissioned to create the Indro Montanelli Public Gardens near the Porta Venezia in Milan, which he ordered in English landscape-style. Among his many private projects are:

- Gardens for the Villa Visconti Castiglione Maineri at Cassinetta di Lugagnano
- Gardens for the Villa Sironi-Marelli at Robecco sul Naviglio
- Gardens and refurbishment of Villa Andrea Ponti part of "Ville Ponti" at Varese
- Restructuring (1873) of Pia casa degli incurabili at Abbiategrasso
- Walls, towers, and gardens at Villa Torneamento
- Ca' de Sass (1869), first home of the Cassa di Risparmio delle Provincie Lombarde in Milan.

Giuseppe Balzaretti was named professor of architecture and design at the Accademia di Belle Arti di Genova he was named a knight of the Order of the Crown of Italy on 14 August 1871. Balzaretti is buried in the Monumental Cemetery of Milan.
