= Biassono–Lesmo Parco railway station =

Railway station in Italy

Biassono–Lesmo Parco
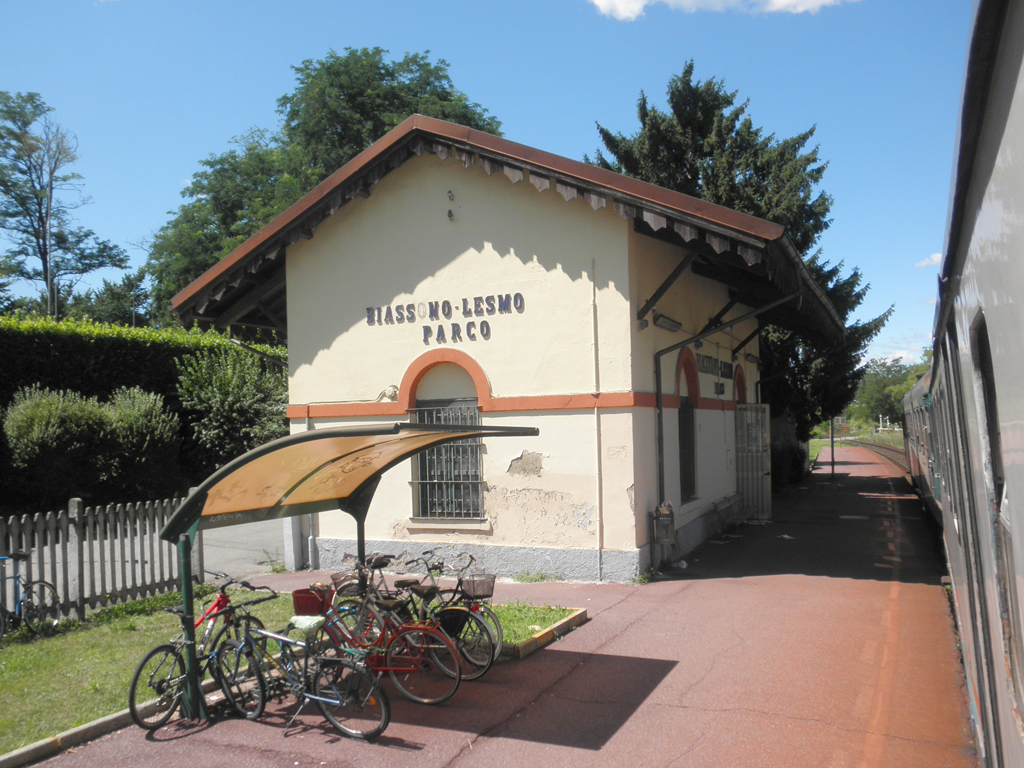

General information
- Location: Biassono, Monza, Lombardy; Italy
- Coordinates: 45°37′56″N 09°17′54″E
- Operator: Rete Ferroviaria Italiana
- Line: Monza–Molteno
- Distance: 7.632 km (4.742 mi) from Monza
- Platforms: 1
- Tracks: 1
- Train operators: Trenord

Other information
- Fare zone: STIBM: Mi5
- Classification: Bronze

Services
| Preceding station | Trenord | Following station |
|---|---|---|
| Buttafava towards Milano Porta Garibaldi | Line S7 (Milan suburban railway service) | Macherio–Canonica towards Lecco |
Location
- Location within Lombardy Location within Northern Italy Location within Italy

Biassono–Lesmo Parco railway station is a railway station in Italy. Located on the Monza–Molteno railway, it serves the municipality of Biassono in Lombardy. The train services are operated by Trenord.

== Train services ==
The station is served by the following service(s):

- Milan Metropolitan services (S7) Milan - Molteno - Lecco

== See also ==
- Milan suburban railway network
