= Carate–Calò railway station =

Railway station in Italy

Carate–Calò
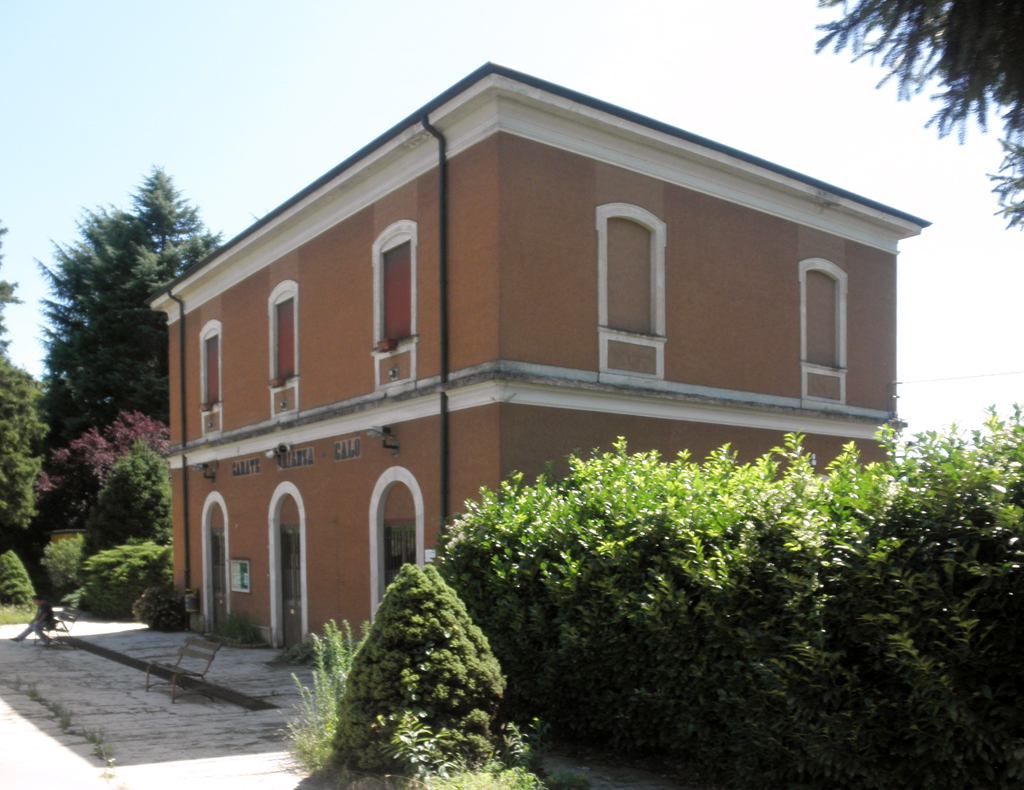

General information
- Location: Carate, Monza, Lombardy; Italy
- Coordinates: 45°40′35″N 09°15′08″E
- Operator: Rete Ferroviaria Italiana
- Line: Monza–Molteno
- Distance: 14.048 km (8.729 mi) from Monza
- Platforms: 1
- Tracks: 1
- Train operators: Trenord

Other information
- Fare zone: STIBM: Mi6
- Classification: Bronze

Services
Preceding station	Trenord	Following station
Triuggio–Ponte Albiate towards Milano Porta Garibaldi	Line S7 (Milan suburban railway service)	Villa Raverio towards Lecco
Location
- Location within Lombardy Location within Northern Italy Location within Italy

Carate–Calò railway station is a railway station in Italy. Located on the Monza–Molteno railway, it serves the municipality of Carate in Lombardy. The train services are operated by Trenord.

The station opened in 1911 as part of the Monza–Molteno railway, which was inaugurated on 14 October 1911 as a private railway line. The station building dates from that same year.

== Train services ==
The station is served by the following service(s):

- Milan Metropolitan services (S7) Milan - Molteno - Lecco

== See also ==
- Milan suburban railway network
