= Monza Sobborghi railway station =

Railway station in Italy

Monza Sobborghi
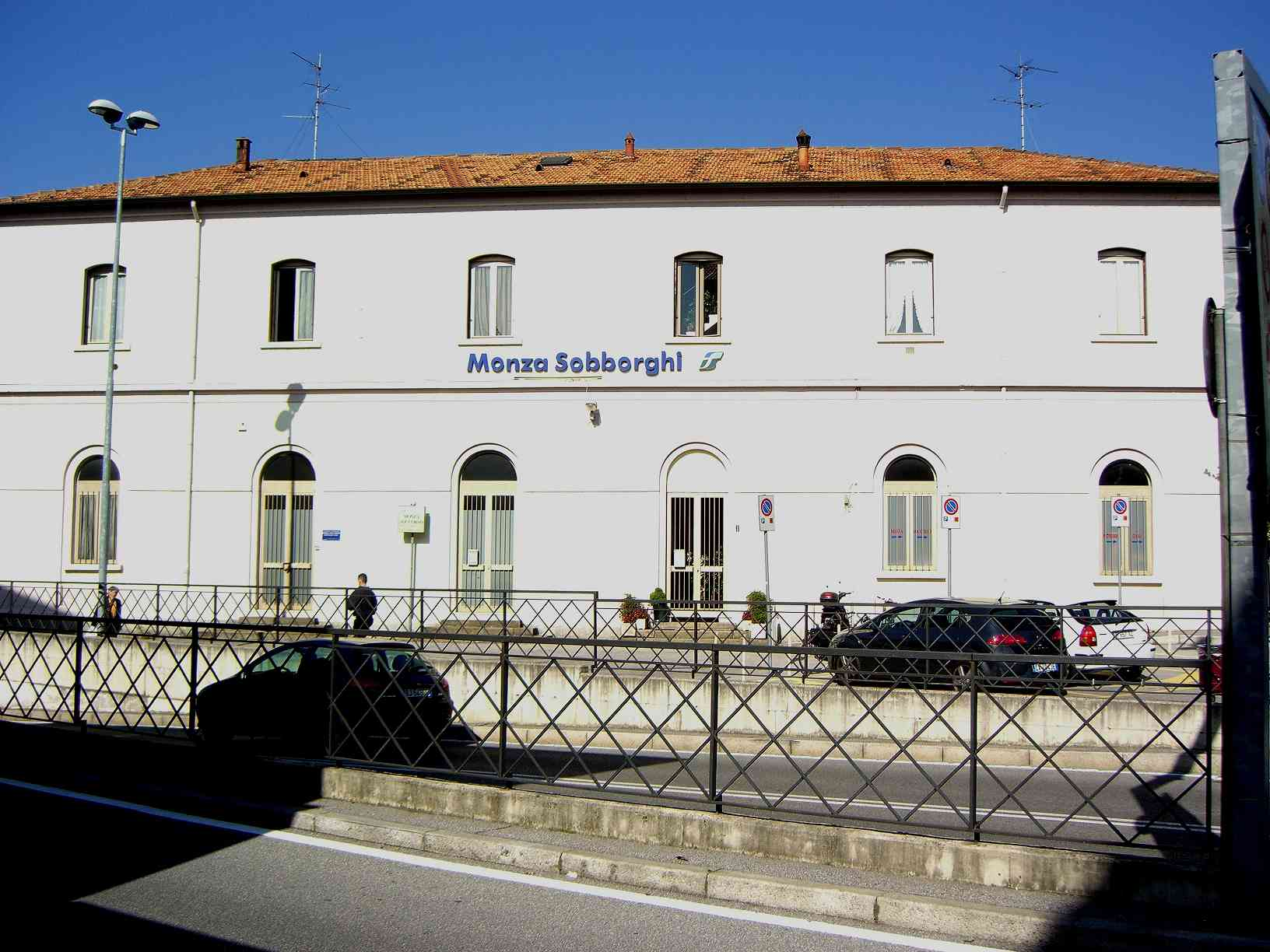

General information
- Location: Monza, Monza, Lombardy; Italy
- Coordinates: 45°34′55″N 09°17′04″E
- Operator: Rete Ferroviaria Italiana
- Line: Monza–Molteno
- Distance: 1.027 km (0.638 mi) from Monza Central
- Platforms: 1
- Tracks: 2
- Train operators: Trenord

Other information
- Fare zone: STIBM: Mi4
- Classification: Bronze

Services
Preceding station	Trenord	Following station
Monza towards Milano Porta Garibaldi	Line S7 (Milan suburban railway service)	Villasanta Parco towards Lecco
S8 does not stop here
Location
- Location within Lombardy Location within Northern Italy Location within Italy

Monza Sobborghi railway station is a railway station in Italy. Located on the Monza–Molteno railway, it serves the municipality of Monza in Lombardy as its secondary station, in the “Sobborghi” neighbourhood. The train services are operated by Trenord.

== Train services ==
The station is served by the following service(s):

- Milan Metropolitan services (S7) Milan - Molteno - Lecco

== See also ==
- Milan suburban railway network
