= Triuggio–Ponte Albiate railway station =

Railway station in Italy

Triuggio–Ponte Albiate
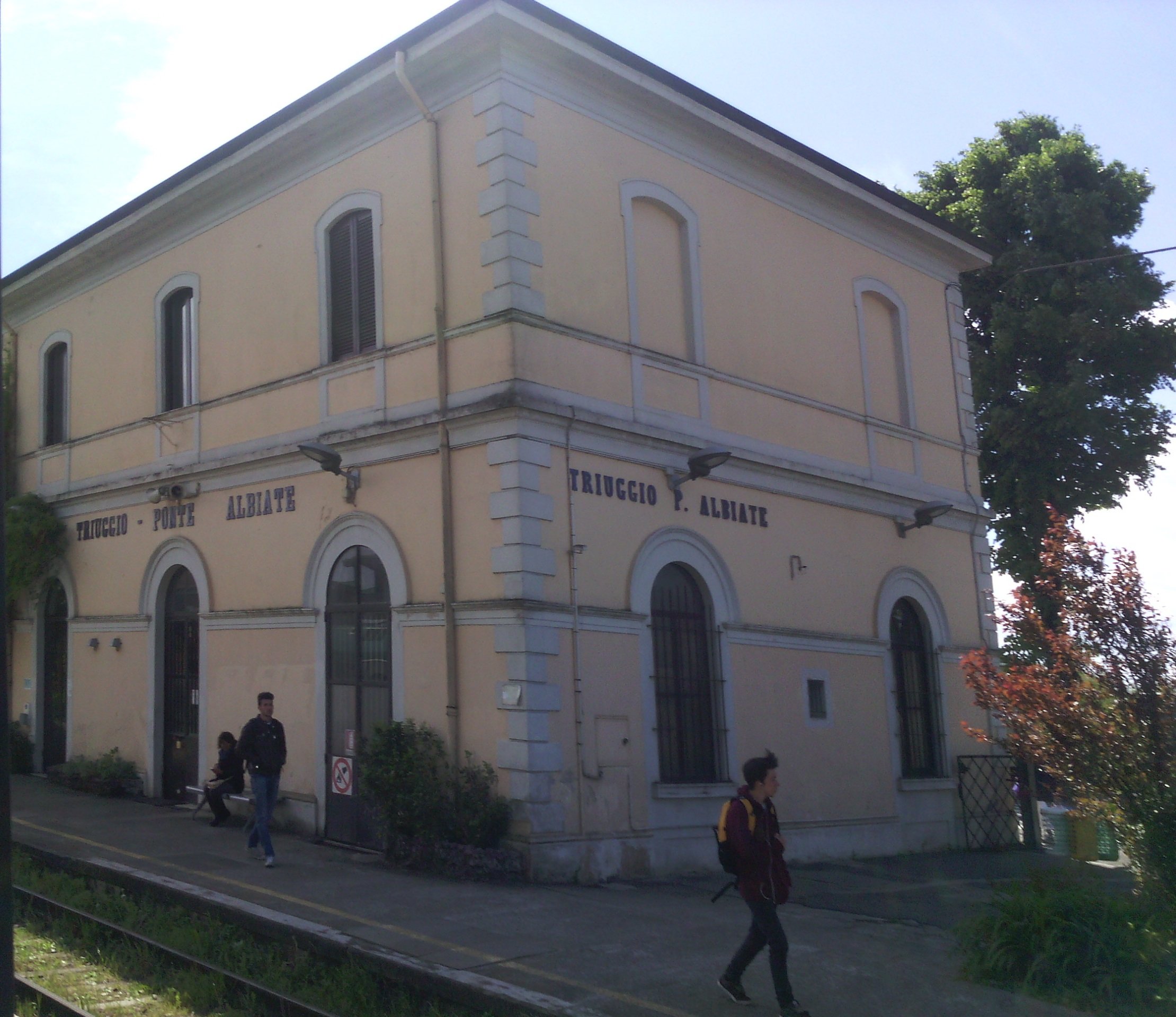

General information
- Location: Triuggio, Monza, Lombardy; Italy
- Coordinates: 45°39′32″N 09°16′01″E
- Operator: Rete Ferroviaria Italiana
- Line: Monza–Molteno
- Distance: 11.664 km (7.248 mi) from Monza
- Platforms: 1
- Tracks: 1
- Train operators: Trenord

Other information
- Fare zone: STIBM: Mi6
- Classification: Bronze

Services
Preceding station	Trenord	Following station
Macherio–Canonica towards Milano Porta Garibaldi	Line S7 (Milan suburban railway service)	Carate–Calò towards Lecco
Location
- Location within Lombardy Location within Northern Italy Location within Italy

Triuggio–Ponte Albiate railway station is a railway station in Italy. Located on the Monza–Molteno railway, it serves the municipality of Triuggio in Lombardy. The train services are operated by Trenord.

== Train services ==
The station is served by the following service(s):

- Milan Metropolitan services (S7) Milan – Molteno – Lecco

== See also ==
- Milan suburban railway network
