= Cassago–Nibionno–Bulciago railway station =

Railway station in Lombardy, Italy

Cassago–Nibionno–Bulciago
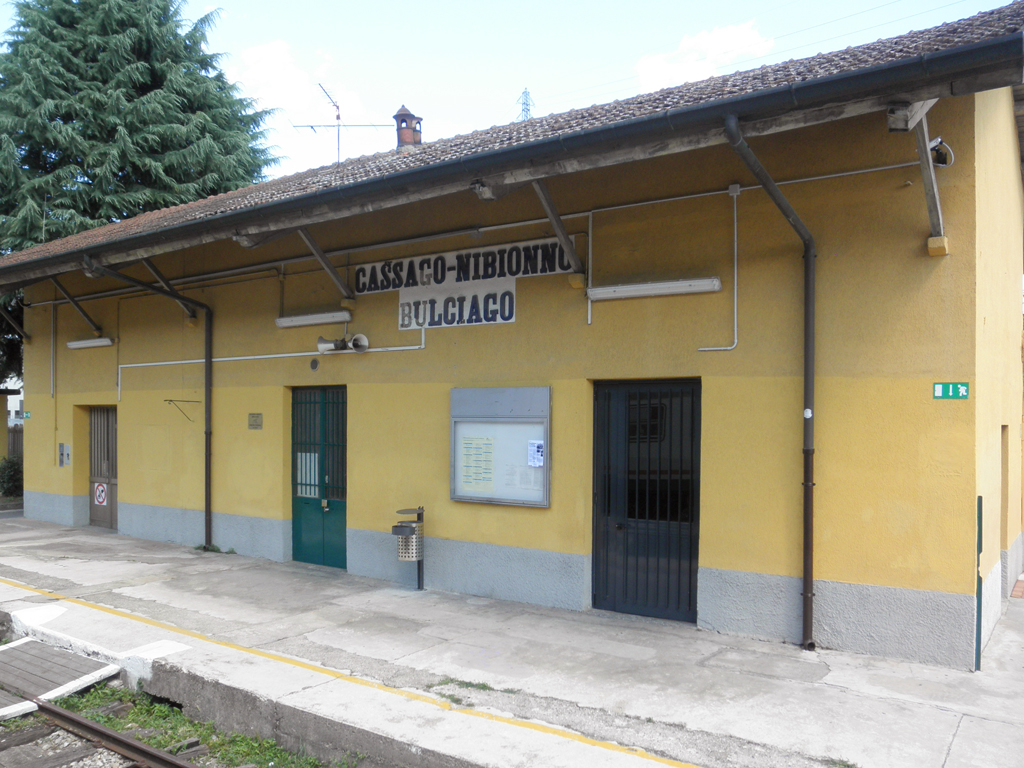

General information
- Location: Cassago Brianza, Lecco, Lombardy; Italy
- Coordinates: 45°44′47″N 09°16′48″E
- Operator: Rete Ferroviaria Italiana
- Line: Monza–Molteno
- Distance: 24.102 km (14.976 mi) from Monza
- Platforms: 1
- Tracks: 1
- Train operators: Trenord

Other information
- Classification: bronze

Services
Preceding station	Trenord	Following station
Renate–Veduggio towards Milano Porta Garibaldi	Line S7 (Milan suburban railway service)	Costa Masnaga towards Lecco
Location
- Location within Lombardy Location within Northern Italy Location within Italy

Cassago–Nibionno–Bulciago railway station is a railway station in Italy. Located on the Monza–Molteno railway, it serves the municipality of Cassago Brianza in Lombardy. The train services are operated by Trenord.

== Train services ==
The station is served by the following service(s):

- Milan Metropolitan services (S7) Milan - Molteno - Lecco

== See also ==
- Milan suburban railway network
