= Renate, Lombardy =

Renate
- Comune
- Comune di Renate
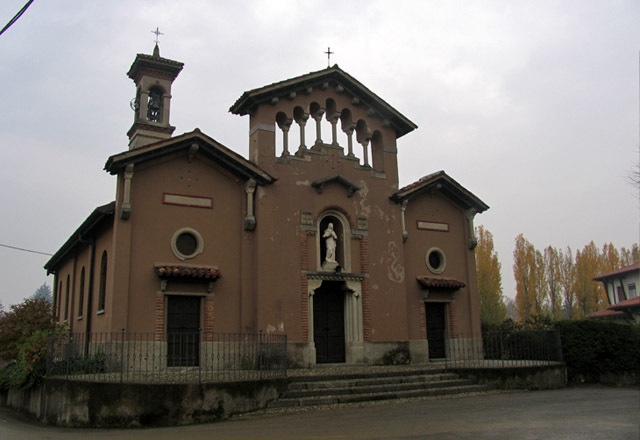

- Coat of arms

- Location within Italy Location within Lombardy
- Coordinates: 45°44′N 9°17′E
- Country: Italy
- Region: Lombardy
- Province: Monza and Brianza (MB)

Area
  - Total: 2.84 km^{2} (1.10 sq mi)

Population (2018-01-01)
  - Total: 3,731
  - Density: 1,310/km^{2} (3,400/sq mi)
- Time zone: UTC+1 (CET)
  - Summer (DST): UTC+2 (CEST)
- Postal code: 20838
- Dialing code: 0362
- Website: Official website

Renate is a comune in the region of Lombardy within the province of Monza and Brianza.

== Sport ==
Renate's football club is AC Renate, which plays in Serie C.

== See also ==
- AC Renate
- Renate-Veduggio railway station
