= Milano Greco Pirelli railway station =

Railway station in Milan, Italy

Milano Greco Pirelli
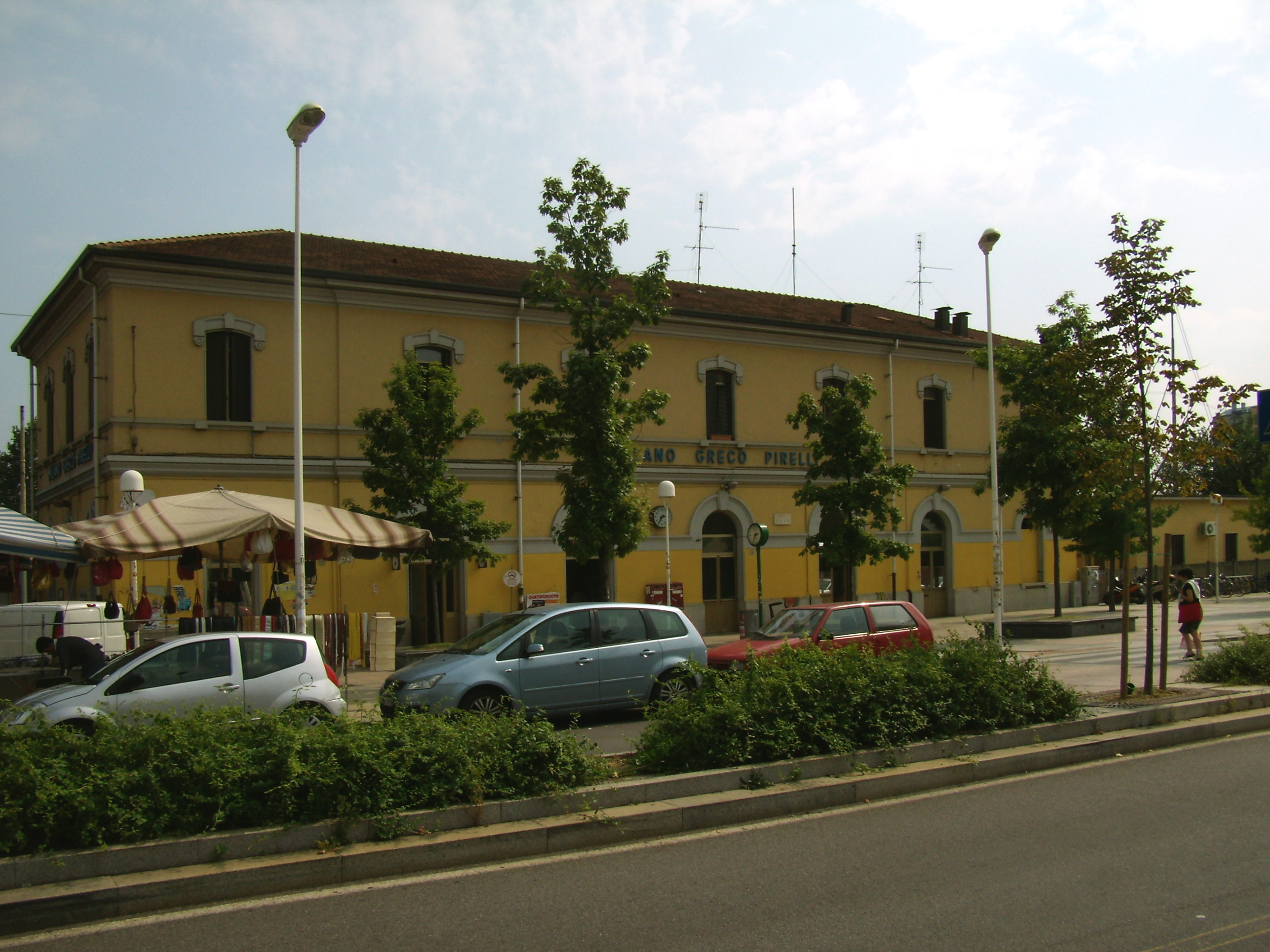

General information
- Location: Via Roberto Cozzi in Greco, Milan; Italy
- Coordinates: 45°30′43″N 09°12′50″E
- Owner: RFI
- Operator: Trenord
- Line: Milano–Monza
- Distance: 3.351 km (2.082 mi) from Milano Centrale; 3.984 km (2.476 mi) from Milano Porta Garibaldi

Other information
- Fare zone: STIBM: Mi1

History
- Opened: 29 March 1914

Services
Preceding station	Trenord	Following station
Milano Porta Garibaldi Terminus	Line S7 (Milan suburban railway service)	Sesto San Giovanni towards Lecco
Milano Porta Garibaldi Terminus	Line S8 (Milan suburban railway service)	Sesto San Giovanni towards Lecco
Milano Centrale limited service Terminus	Line S8 (Milan suburban railway service)	Sesto San Giovanni towards Lecco
Milano Lambrate towards Albairate–Vermezzo	Line S9 (Milan suburban railway service)	Sesto San Giovanni towards Saronno
Milano Porta Garibaldi towards Rho	Line S11 (Milan suburban railway service)	Sesto San Giovanni towards Chiasso
Location
- Location within Milan Location within Lombardy Location within Northern Italy Location within Italy

Milano Greco Pirelli railway station (Italian: Stazione di Milano Greco Pirelli) is one of the main stations serving the comune of Milan. Opened in 1914, it is in the north of the city, in the quartiere of Greco. It is on the Milan–Monza railway.

The station is currently managed by Rete Ferroviaria Italiana (RFI). Train services are operated by Trenitalia. Each of these companies is a subsidiary of Ferrovie dello Stato Italiane (FS), Italy's state-owned rail company.

The station is located on Via Roberto Cozzi, in the southeastern part of Greco.

== History ==
The station was opened on 29 March 1914. At that time, it was located in the then comune of Greco Milanese (annexed to Milan in 1923).

The station had for decades served the nearby Pirelli factories, until their disposal at the end of the twentieth century. The disposal was followed by a strong urban development leading to the new modern district, designed by the architect Vittorio Gregotti. Inside the new district are the new University of Milan Bicocca and the Teatro degli Arcimboldi.

The next major station to the north is Sesto San Giovanni. To the south are Milano Centrale and Milano Lambrate. Since 1966, the station has also been connected to Milano Porta Garibaldi through a newly built tunnel. The tunnel portal is to the south of Mirabello, near Piazza Carbonari (the so-called Passantino).

== Train services ==
=== Suburban lines ===
- S 7 Lecco ↔ Milano Porta Garibaldi
- S 8 Lecco ↔ Milano Porta Garibaldi
- S 9 Saronno ↔ Albairate-Vermezzo
- S 11 Chiasso ↔ Milano Porta Garibaldi

== Interchange ==
The station offers interchange with tram line 7, urban bus lines 52, 81, 86 and 87, and interurban bus 728.

== See also ==
- Railway stations in Milan
- History of rail transport in Italy
- Rail transport in Italy
- Railway stations in Italy
