= Sesto San Giovanni railway station =

Railway station in Italy

Sesto San Giovanni
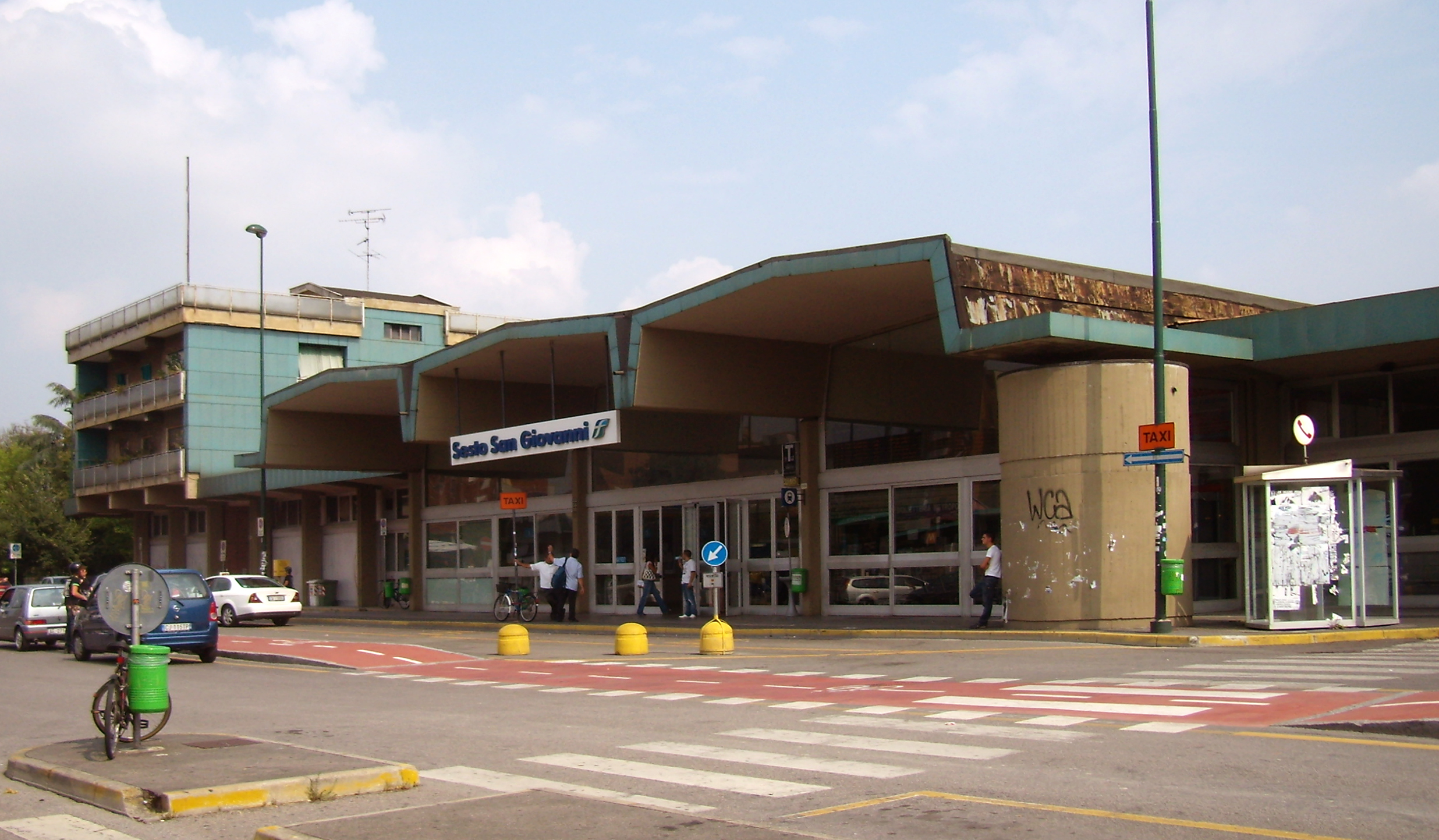

General information
- Location: Piazza I Maggio; Sesto San Giovanni, Milan, Lombardy; Italy
- Coordinates: 45°32′29″N 09°14′20″E
- Operator: Rete Ferroviaria Italiana
- Line: Milan–Chiasso
- Distance: 7.060 km (4.387 mi) from Milano Centrale; 7.695 km (4.781 mi) from Milano Porta Garibaldi
- Platforms: 5
- Train operators: Trenord
- Connections: Sesto 1º Maggio MM; ATM buses

Other information
- Fare zone: STIBM: Mi3
- Classification: Silver

History
- Opened: 17 August 1840; 186 years ago
- Rebuilt: 19 January 1969; 57 years ago

Services
Preceding station	Trenord	Following station
Milano Greco Pirelli towards Milano Porta Garibaldi	Line S7 (Milan suburban railway service)	Monza towards Lecco
Milano Greco Pirelli towards Milano Porta Garibaldi	Line S8 (Milan suburban railway service)	Monza towards Lecco
Milano Greco Pirelli towards Albairate–Vermezzo	Line S9 (Milan suburban railway service)	Monza towards Saronno
Milano Greco Pirelli towards Rho	Line S11 (Milan suburban railway service)	Monza towards Chiasso
Location
- Location within Lombardy Location within Northern Italy Location within Italy

Sesto San Giovanni railway station is a railway station in Italy. Located on the Milan–Chiasso railway, it serves the city of Sesto San Giovanni.

== Services ==
Sesto San Giovanni is served by lines S7, S8, S9, and S11 of the Milan suburban railway service, and by the Milan–Carnate–Bergamo regional line, all operated by the Lombard railway company Trenord.

== See also ==
- Milan suburban railway service
- History of Sesto San Giovanni
