= Molteno railway station =

Railway station in Italy

Molteno
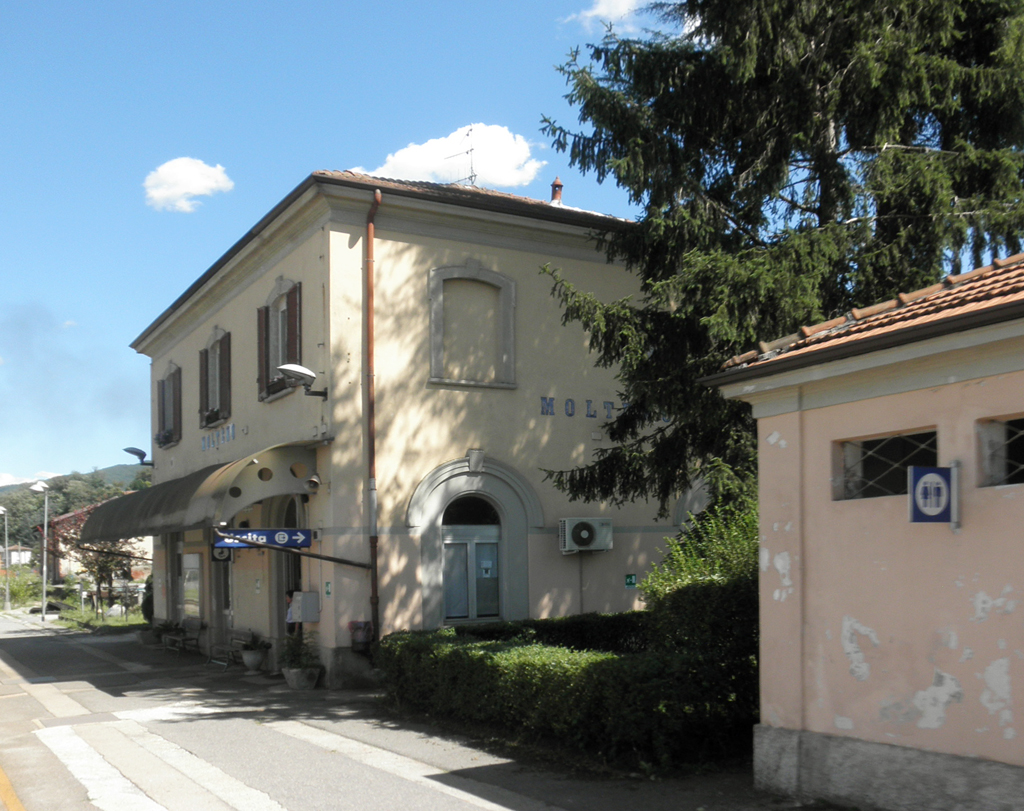

General information
- Location: Molteno, Lecco, Lombardy; Italy
- Coordinates: 45°46′51″N 09°18′06″E
- Operator: Rete Ferroviaria Italiana
- Lines: Monza–Molteno; Como–Lecco
- Distance: 29.214 km (18.153 mi) from Monza; 14.715 km (9.143 mi) from Lecco
- Platforms: 3
- Tracks: 2
- Train operators: Trenord

Other information
- Classification: silver

Services
Preceding station	Trenord	Following station
Costa Masnaga towards Milano Porta Garibaldi	Line S7 (Milan suburban railway service)	Oggiono towards Lecco
Location
- Location within Lombardy Location within Northern Italy Location within Italy

Molteno railway station is a railway station in Italy. Located at the junction of the Monza–Molteno railway with the Como–Lecco railway, it serves the municipality of Molteno in Lombardy. The train services are operated by Trenord.

== Train services ==
The station is served by the following services:

- Milan Metropolitan services (S7) Milan – Molteno – Lecco, calling at all stations (apart from a few early morning trains, not calling at all station between Lecco and Molteno)
- Lombardy Regional services (R18) Como – Molteno – Lecco (it runs between Molteno and Como calling at all stations for most of the day, with only the first few services in early morning and the last ones in the evening running all the way to Lecco, while not stopping at all the stations in between)

The regional train Molteno-Como San Giovanni is scheduled to arrive a few minutes before (and to depart a few minutes after) the two suburban S7 trains running in opposite directions have called at the station, thus allowing for interchanges in all possible directions out of Molteno (e.g.: S7 train to Lecco-regional train to Como San Giovanni).

== See also ==
- Milan suburban railway network
