= Lissone–Muggiò railway station =

Railway station in Italy

Lissone–Muggiò
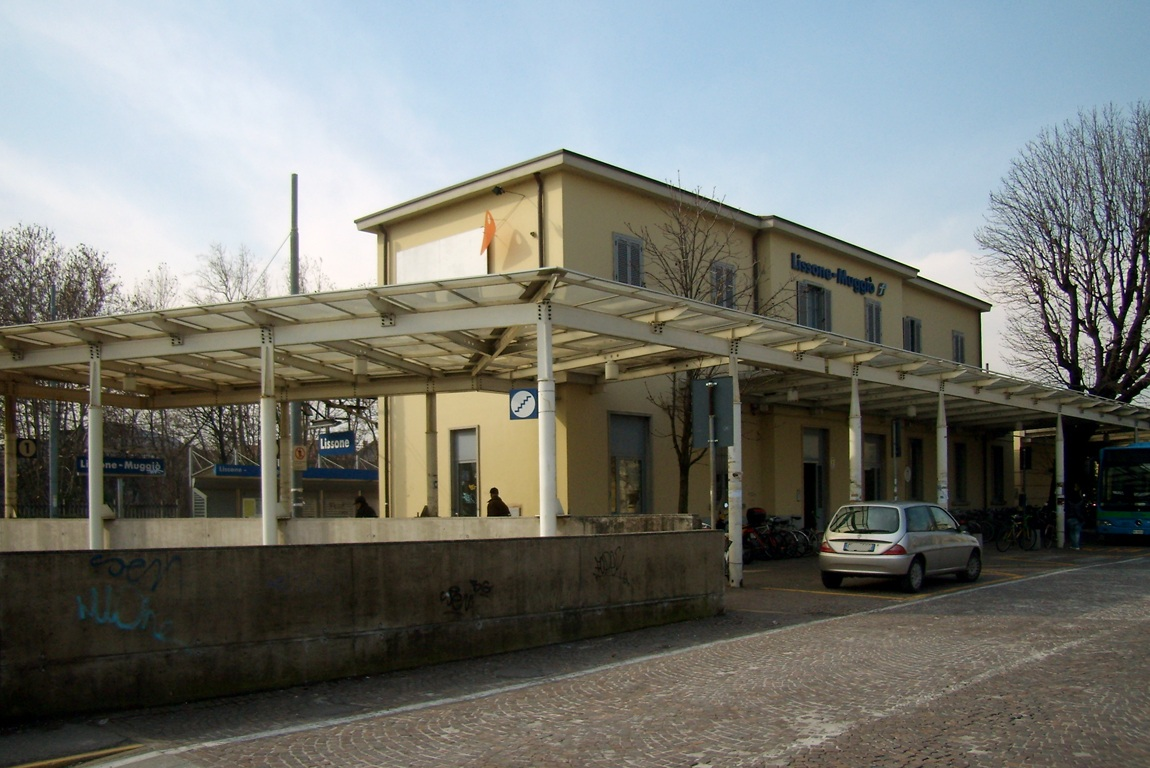

General information
- Location: Piazzale Stazione 3 Lissone, Monza and Brianza, Lombardy; Italy
- Coordinates: 45°36′22″N 09°14′08″E
- Elevation: 190 m (620 ft)
- Owner: Rete Ferroviaria Italiana
- Line: Milan–Chiasso
- Distance: 16.348 km (10.158 mi) from Milano Centrale
- Platforms: 2
- Train operators: Trenord

Other information
- Fare zone: STIBM: Mi5
- Classification: Silver

History
- Opened: 1882; 144 years ago
- Electrified: 1939

Services
Preceding station	Trenord	Following station
Desio towards Saronno	Line S9 (Milan suburban railway service)	Monza towards Albairate–Vermezzo
Desio towards Chiasso	Line S11 (Milan suburban railway service)	Monza towards Rho
Location
- Location within Lombardy Location within Northern Italy Location within Italy

Lissone–Muggiò is a railway station in Italy. Located on the Milan–Chiasso railway, it serves the towns of Lissone and Muggiò.

== Services ==
Lissone–Muggiò is served by lines S9 and S11 of the Milan suburban railway network, operated by the Lombard railway company Trenord.

== See also ==
- Milan suburban railway network
