= Line S8 (Milan suburban railway service) =

Railway line in Milan, Italy

Lecco–Carnate–Milano Porta Garibaldi
- S8
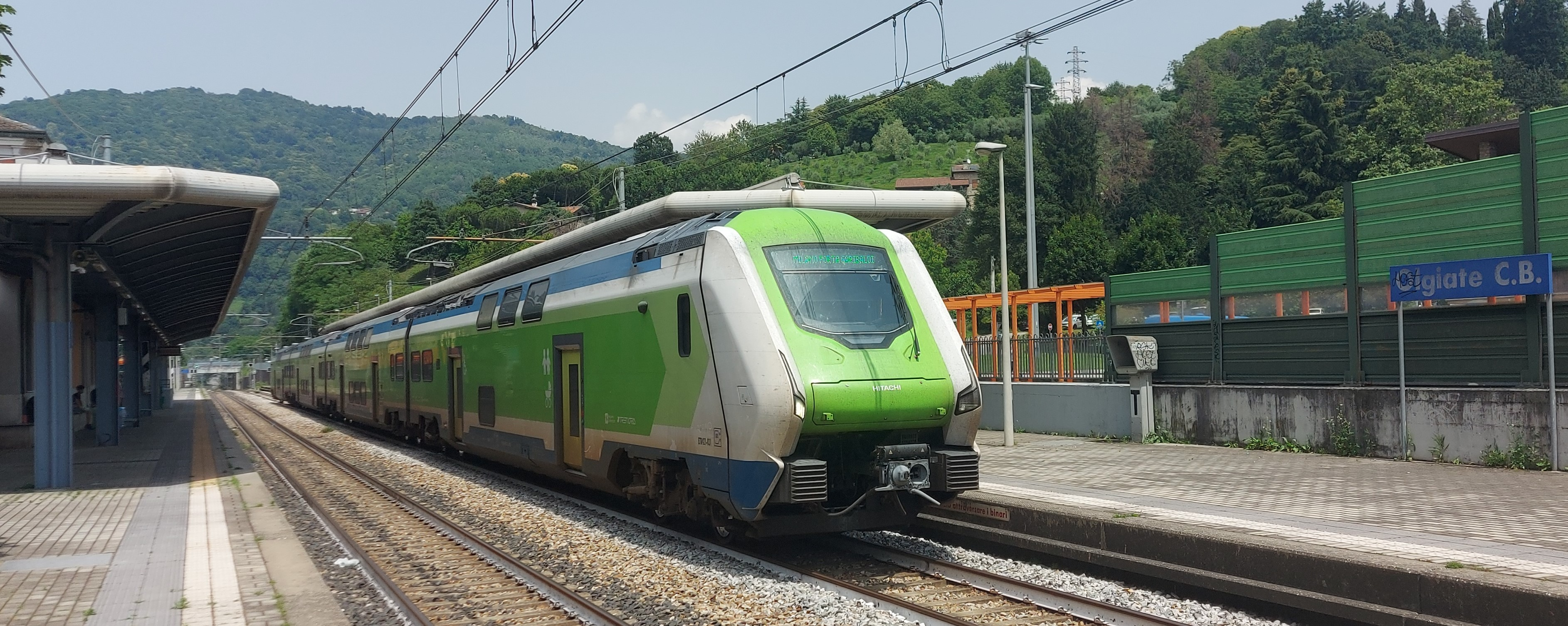
- An S8 train at Olgiate-Calco-Brivio.

Overview
- Status: Operational
- Locale: Milan, Italy
- Termini: Lecco; Milano Porta Garibaldi
- Stations: 13
- Colour on map: RGB 246 182 182
- Website: Trenord

Service
- Type: Commuter rail
- System: Milan suburban railway service
- Route number: S8
- Rolling stock: Caravaggio
- Daily ridership: 51000 (+22%)

History
- Opened: 2009

Technical
- Line length: 50 km (31 mi)
- Track gauge: 1,435 mm (4 ft 8 1/2 in)
- Electrification: 3,000 V DC
- Operating speed: 160 km/h (99 mph)
Route map
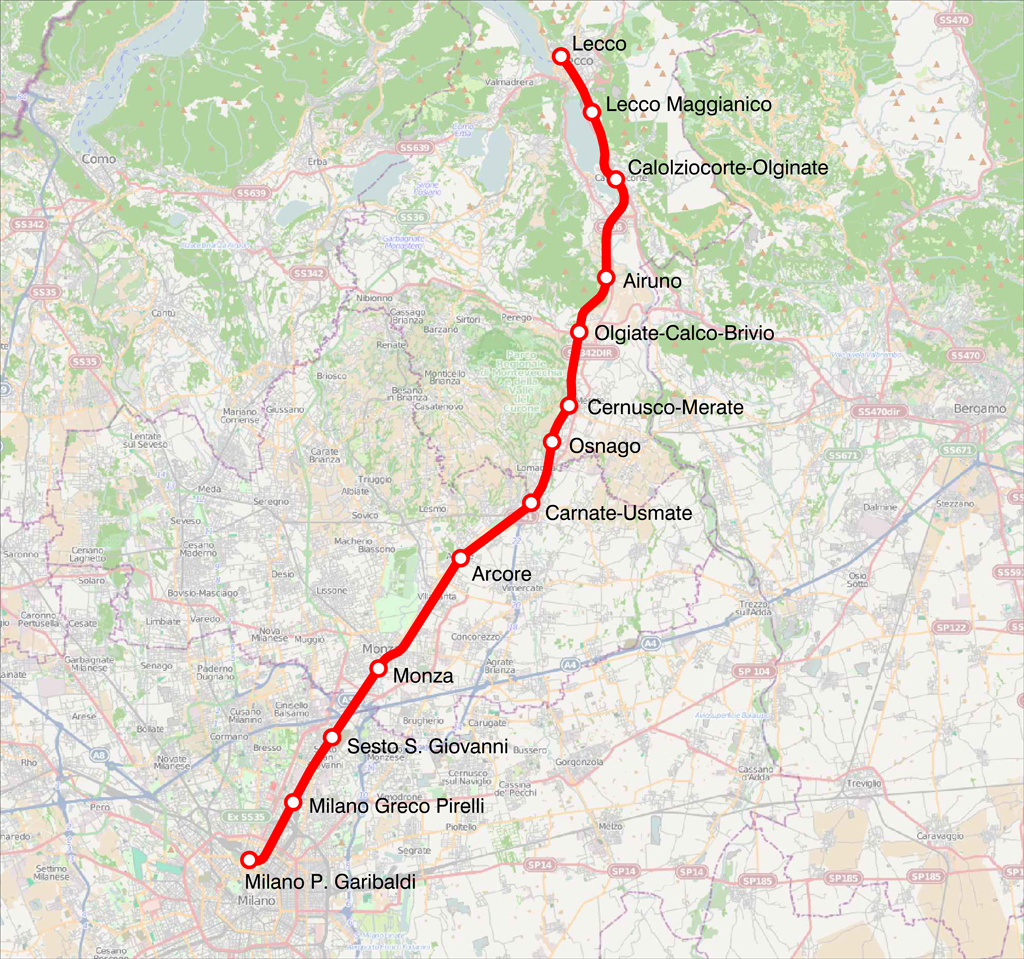
Map of line S8.

The S8 is a commuter rail route forming part of the Milan suburban railway service (Italian: Servizio ferroviario suburbano di Milano), which converges on the city of Milan, Italy.

The route runs over the infrastructure of the Lecco–Milan railway. Like all but one of the other Milan suburban railway service routes, it is operated by Trenord.

It's the second most frequented suburban line in the Milan metropolitan area (after S5) having a daily ridership of 51 thousand passengers in 2025 with an increase of 22% compared to 2024.

== Route ==
- Lecco ↔ Carnate-Usmate ↔ Milano Porta Garibaldi

Line S8, a radial route, heads initially in an southwesterly direction from Lecco to Monza. From there, it turns south towards Milano Greco Pirelli, and finally south west again, to Milano Porta Garibaldi.

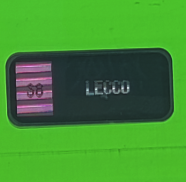
LED display of a S8 train headed to Lecco

== History ==
The route was activated on 14 December 2008, and was initially an hourly regional rail service between its two termini. In September 2009, the frequency of services on the route was increased, to bring it up to one service every 30 minutes during rush hour.

On 13 December 2009, the route was reclassified as the S8 suburban rail line. On 22 March 2010, service frequency was increased again, to bring services to half-hourly intervals from 05:00 to 11:00 and from 13:00 to 22:00 on weekdays.

As of December 2025, the frequency has been increased to half-hourly from Monday to Saturday, from early morning to late at night. On Sunday the frequency is hourly.

== Stations ==
The stations on the S8 are as follows (the stations with a coloured background are within the municipality of Milan):

Station	Opened	Interchange	Note
Lecco	1863	Treni regionali	
Lecco Maggianico	1882		
Calolziocorte-Olginate	1863	Treni regionali	
Airuno	1896		
Olgiate-Calco-Brivio	1873		
Cernusco-Merate	1873		
Osnago	1896		
Carnate-Usmate	1873	Treni regionali	
Arcore	1873	Treni regionali	
Monza	1840	Line S9 Line S11 Treni regionali	
Sesto San Giovanni	1969	Line M1 Line S11 Treni regionali	
Milano Greco Pirelli	1914	Line S11 Treni regionali	
Milano Porta Garibaldi	1963	MXP	

== Scheduling ==
As of 2012, S8 trains ran hourly between 06:00 and 24:00 Monday to Saturday, with additional services during rush hour in the mornings and evenings.

As of December 2025, the S8 service operates with a half-hourly frequency throughout the entire day from Monday to Saturday. Southbound trains from Lecco depart at .06 and .36 past the hour from 05:06 until the end of service at 23:36. Northbound trains from Milano Porta Garibaldi depart at .22 and .52 past the hour from 05:22 until the final departure at 23:52. The only exception to this pattern is the 23:22 service, which departs from Milano Centrale instead of Porta Garibaldi. On Sundays and public holidays, the frequency is reduced to hourly.

== See also ==
- History of rail transport in Italy
- List of Milan suburban railway stations
- Rail transport in Italy
- Transport in Milan
