= Seregno railway station =

Railway station in Italy

Seregno
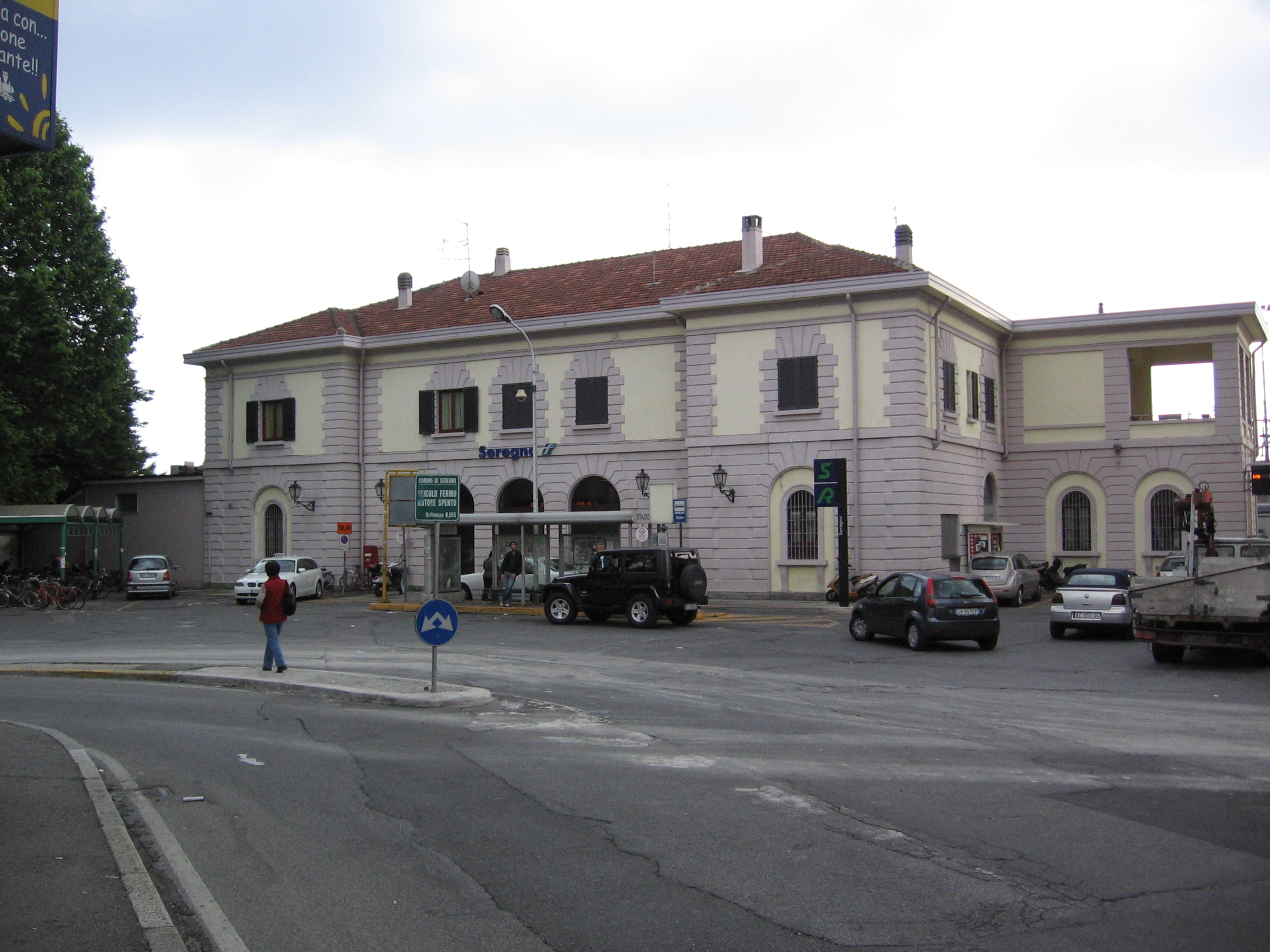

General information
- Location: Piazza XXV Aprile 3 Seregno, Monza and Brianza, Lombardy; Italy
- Coordinates: 45°38′46″N 09°12′11″E
- Operator: Rete Ferroviaria Italiana
- Lines: Milan–Chiasso; Saronno–Seregno; Seregno–Bergamo
- Distance: 21.598 km (13.420 mi) from Milano Centrale; 31.867 km (19.801 mi) from Ponte San Pietro; 36.397 km (22.616 mi) from Milano Cadorna
- Train operators: Trenord; TiLo

Other information
- Fare zone: STIBM: Mi6
- Classification: Silver

History
- Opened: 6 October 1849; 176 years ago
- Electrified: 1939

Services
Preceding station	Trenord	Following station
Seveso–Baruccana towards Saronno	Line S9 (Milan suburban railway service)	Desio towards Albairate–Vermezzo
Camnago–Lentate towards Chiasso	Line S11 (Milan suburban railway service)	Desio towards Rho
Location
- Location within Lombardy Location within Northern Italy Location within Italy

Seregno railway station is the railway station of the city of Seregno, in Italy.

The station is located on the Milan–Chiasso railway, and is the terminus of the Saronno–Seregno and Seregno–Bergamo lines.

== Services ==
Seregno is served by lines S9 and S11 of the Milan suburban railway network, and is the terminus of the regional trains to Carnate. All these services are operated by the Lombard railway company Trenord.

During the peak hours, Seregno is also served by the Milan–Bellinzona RegioExpress trains, operated by TiLo.

== See also ==
- Milan suburban railway network
