= Desio railway station =

Railway station in Lombardy, Italy

Desio
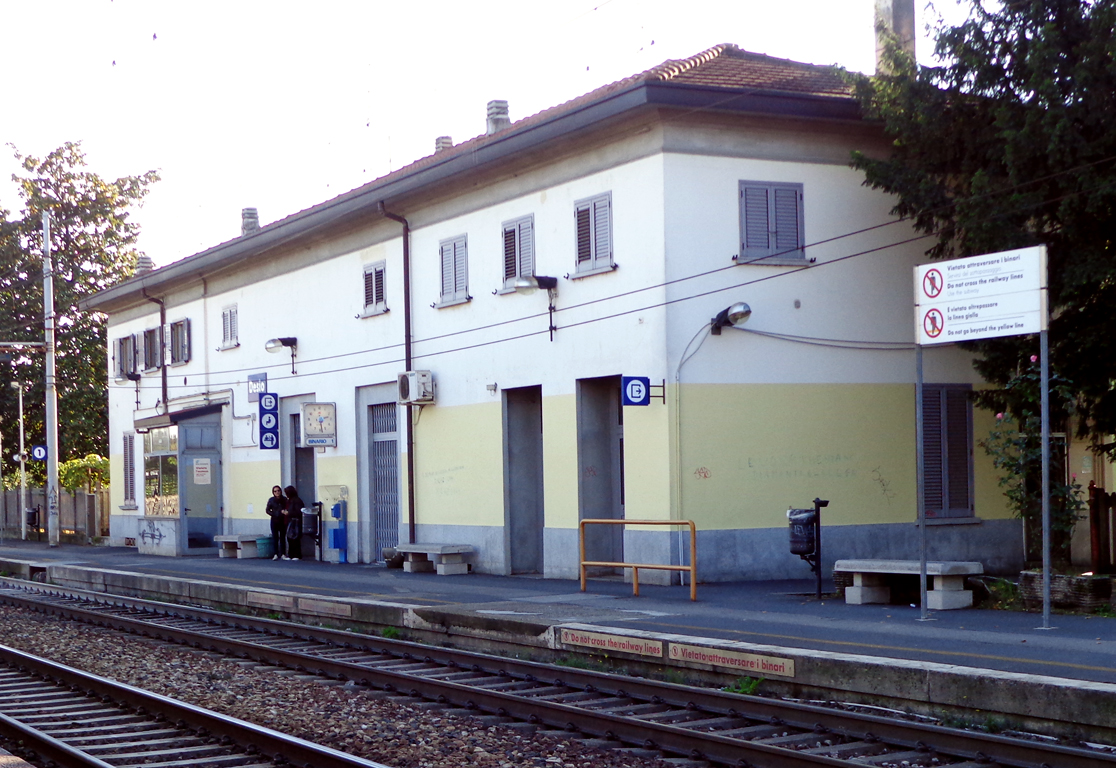

General information
- Location: Viale Stazione 2 Desio, Monza and Brianza, Lombardy; Italy
- Coordinates: 45°37′13″N 09°13′06″E
- Operator: Rete Ferroviaria Italiana
- Line: Milan–Chiasso
- Distance: 18.436 km (11.456 mi) from Milano Centrale
- Platforms: 2
- Train operators: Trenord

Other information
- Fare zone: STIBM: Mi5
- Classification: Silver

History
- Opened: 1 October 1849; 176 years ago
- Electrified: 1939

Services
Preceding station	Trenord	Following station
Seregno towards Saronno	Line S9 (Milan suburban railway service)	Lissone–Muggiò towards Albairate–Vermezzo
Seregno towards Chiasso	Line S11 (Milan suburban railway service)	Lissone–Muggiò towards Rho
Location
- Location within Lombardy Location within Northern Italy Location within Italy

Desio is a railway station in Italy. Located on the Milan–Chiasso railway, it serves the town of Desio.

== Services ==
Desio is served by lines S9 and S11 of the Milan suburban railway network, operated by the Lombard railway company Trenord.

== See also ==
- Milan suburban railway network
