= Arcore =

Municipality in the province of Monza and Brianza, Lombardy

Arcore Arcor (Lombard)
- Comune
- Comune di Arcore
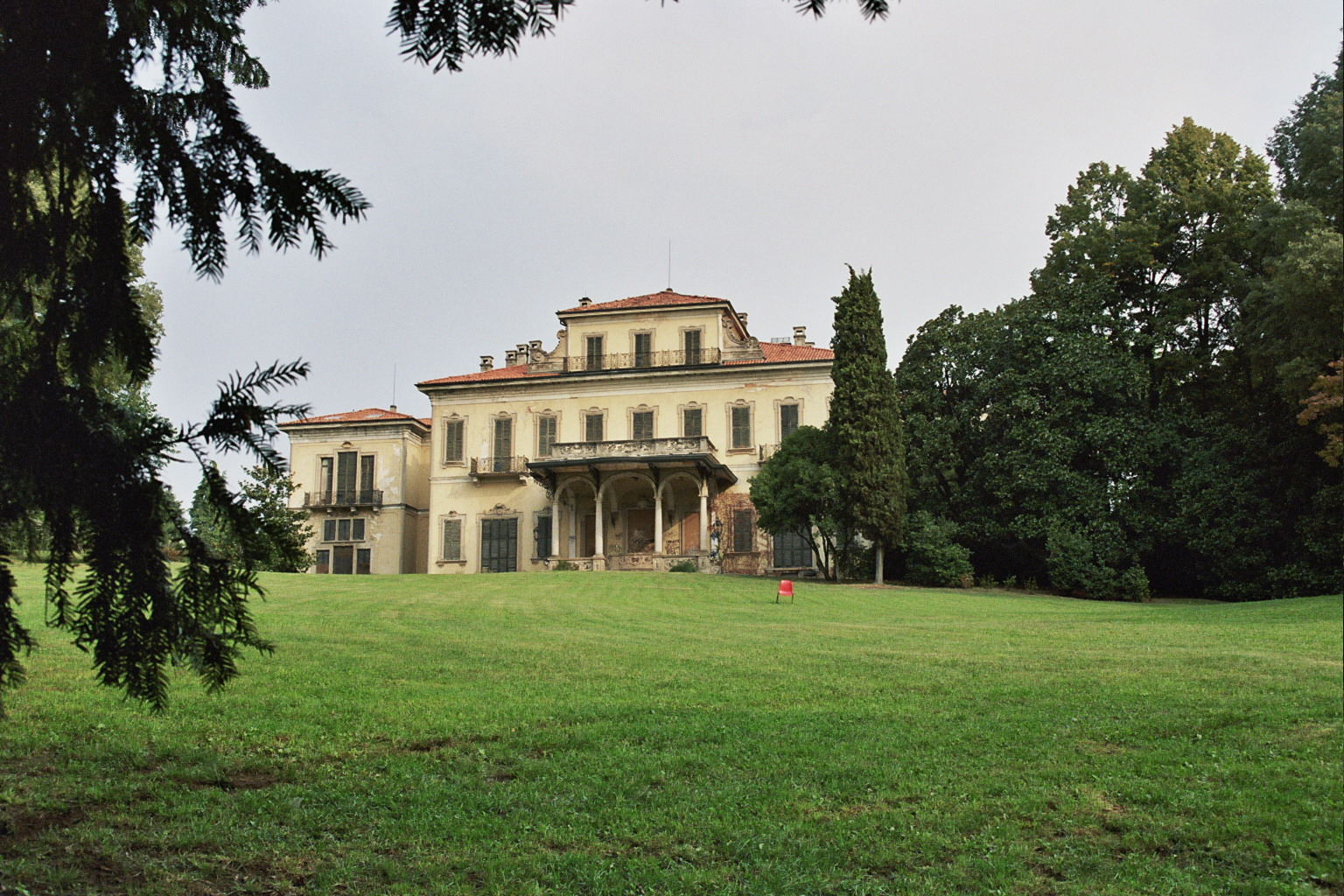
- Villa Borromeo-D'Adda, Arcore

- Coat of arms

- Location within Italy Location within Lombardy
- Coordinates: 45°38′N 9°19′E
- Country: Italy
- Region: Lombardy
- Province: Monza and Brianza (MB)
- Frazioni: Bernate, Cascina del Bruno, La Ca', Ca Bianca

Government
  - Mayor: Rosalba Colombo (PD)

Area
  - Total: 9.3 km^{2} (3.6 sq mi)
- Elevation: 193 m (633 ft)

Population (30 November 2017)
  - Total: 17,960
  - Density: 1,900/km^{2} (5,000/sq mi)
- Demonym: Arcoresi
- Time zone: UTC+1 (CET)
  - Summer (DST): UTC+2 (CEST)
- Postal code: 20862
- Dialing code: 039
- Website: Official website

Arcore (Italian: [ˈarkore]; Brianzoeu: Arcor [ˈaːrkur]) is a comune (municipality) in the Province of Monza and Brianza in the Italian region of Lombardy, about 20 kilometres (12 mi) northeast of Milan. It's situated on the banks of River Lambro.

Arcore borders the following municipalities: Usmate Velate, Camparada, Lesmo, Biassono, Vimercate, Villasanta, and Concorezzo.

== History ==
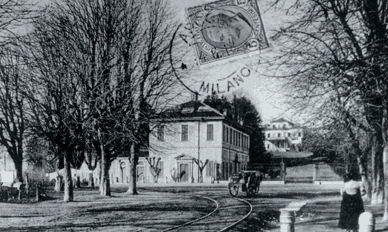
Via Roma and Villa Borromeo-D'Adda, end of 19th century.

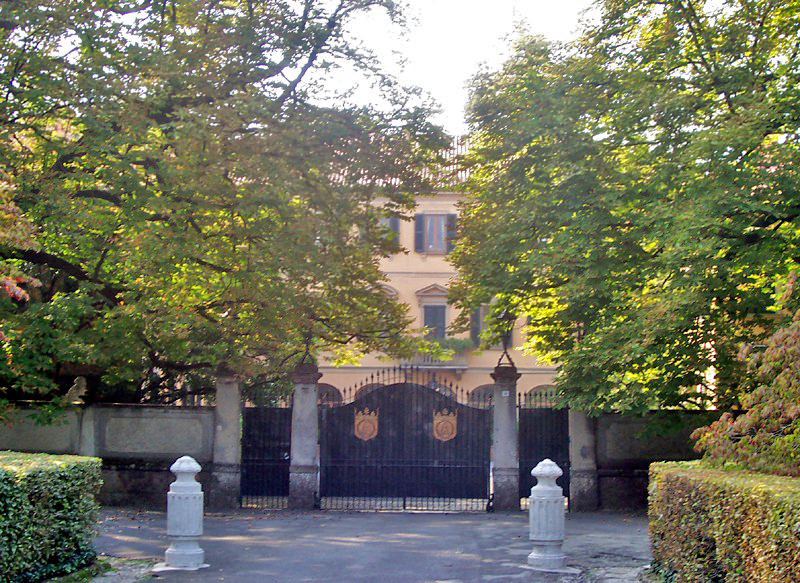
Villa San Martino, the personal residence of Silvio Berlusconi.

The origin of the city is not clear: by the etymology of the name, it's probably datable during the Roman Empire. To endorse this hypothesis there are different elements: the presence of centurations and the discovery, in the Middle Ages, of a Roman marble slab, now kept in the Archaeological Museum of Milan. The name is also believed to be derived from the name of the semi-god Hercules.

The oldest documents so far discovered dates back to the 10th century. Arcore, in the Middle Ages, was under the control of the Pieve of Vimercate, and the presence of two monasteries, la Casa delle Umiliate in Sant'Apollinare and the Benedictine monastery of Saint Martin of Tours, is historically documented.

By the 16th century several noble lombard families (Casati, Durini, Giulini, Vismara, D'Adda, Barbò) began to build many important villas usually surrounded by park, the ville di delizia, including the Villa Borromeo-d'Adda, the Villa la Cazzola and the Villa San Martino (the former residence of Silvio Berlusconi).

=== Arcore Castle ===
Evidence suggests that the town once had its own castle. The earliest document mentioning its existence is the Donation of Ariprando and Gisla (now held at the Historical Archive of Concorezzo), dating back to 1100, which records the bequest by the Milanese noble Ariprando and his wife Gisla of two properties, the first of which was located near the aforementioned castle.

… casa una cum area infra castrum de loco Arcori… casa una cum area et curte… infra villam de suprascripto loco Arcori

— notary Ugo, Bequest of Ariprando and Gisla

Another document, from the 13th century, preserved in the State Archive of Milan, confirms the existence of a castrum in vico Arcole. This document was cited in the 19th century by historian and paleographer Giovanni Maria Dozio in Notizie di Vimercate e la sua Pieve, where he states

… Arcore was a place of some significance in the Middle Ages and had a castle, in a location that still retains its name, owned in the twelfth century by the valvassores of Arcore…

— Giovanni Dozio, Notizie di Vimercate e la sua Pieve

Although no trace of the castle remains today, the Teresian maps of 1722 indicate the current Via Monte Grappa as the Street of the Castle, and in local tradition, the area of the city between Via Abate d'Adda and Via San Gregorio is still referred to as the Castle Zone.

== After the Italian unification ==
After the Italian unification (1861), through the construction of the 2 Arcore's railway stations (the first in front at Villa Borromeo-D'Adda, and the second – of a different railway line – located in Ca' Bianca-Buttafava) and the establishment of numerous industries (like Gilera), the city has gradually expanded up to become, today, one of the most active and largest cities in Brianza.

== Main sights ==
=== Villa Borromeo d'Adda ===
A "villa di delizia" and a complex of buildings surrounded by a park from the 17th–18th centuries, open to the public. It partially houses the town hall in the foresteria and adjacent buildings at the park entrance, while the stables house a branch of the Restoration Department of the Accademia di Belle Arti di Brera in Milan.

The villa has been completely restored by the municipal administration, which owns it. It actually consists of two distinct villas: the first, dating back to the 1600s, and the second, known as la Montagnola, built about a century later by Abbot Ferdinando D'Adda. The two were unified in the mid-1800s by architect Giuseppe Balzaretto, who redesigned the facades in an eclectic style and designed the approximately 30-hectare park surrounding the complex.

Noteworthy are also the stables and, especially, the Vela Chapel, again commissioned by Balzaretto for Isabella Isimbardi, wife of Marquis Giovanni D'Adda, featuring marble sculptures by Vincenzo Vela (from whom the chapel takes its name).

=== Villa San Martino ===
Formerly villa Casati-Stampa, with an park dating back to the 15th century, originally a Benedictine monastery, was purchased and restored in the 18th century by the Counts Giulini. The building was arranged or perhaps maintained by the Giulini in the typical U-shaped structure open towards the town.

During these renovations, a grand access avenue was laid out along a perspective axis extending from the square in front of Villa Borromeo, heading west and passing through a sequence of the honor courtyard, central arch of the portico, and corresponding opening in the hall; it then crosses the garden and extends to the Lambro, flanked by a long row of tall poplars.

The perspective axis at the entrance, although now partially interrupted visually by a green patch of trees and shrubs and the surrounding wall, has remained substantially intact over time. After the Giulini's modifications, the villa passed to the Casati family in the first half of the 19th century due to the marriage of Anna Giulini Della Porta (1818–1883) to Camillo Casati (1805–1869), and by the end of the same century, it came to the Casati Stampa di Soncino branch. Count Alessandro Casati (1881–1955), who lived there until his death, expanded the library and frequently hosted his friend Benedetto Croce.

Upon the count's death, the property went to his nephew, the closest relative, Marquis Camillo Casati Stampa di Soncino (1927–1970), who lived there intermittently. After Camillo's suicide on 30 August 1970 after murdering his wife Anna Fallarino and her companion Massimo Minorenti, the property passed to Anna Maria Casati Stampa di Soncino, born in Rome on 22 May 1951, the daughter of the Marquis from his first marriage (with Letizia Izzo). The young woman, then nineteen years old (and thus a minor according to the law at that time), was placed under the guardianship of Giorgio Bergamasco, with Cesare Previti as pro-guardian.

On 26 July 1972 Bergamasco was appointed Minister for Relations with Parliament in the second Andreotti government; meanwhile, Casati Stampa had already emancipated from guardianship upon turning twenty-one on 22 May 1972. Subsequently, Anna Maria Casati Stampa, who had married Count Pierdonato Donà dalle Rose, moved with her husband to Brazil, and her Italian legal representative was her former pro-guardian Cesare Previti. Pressed by financial needs and having inherited not only family assets but also significant tax arrears from her father, Anna Maria Casati Stampa di Soncino in Donà dalle Rose decided in 1973 to sell the villa and appointed her lawyer, Cesare Previti, as broker. The villa was eventually sold in 1974—at a price much lower than its assessed value—to Milanese entrepreneur and future Prime Minister Silvio Berlusconi, who lived there until his death in June 2023. After his death, Marta Fascina resides in Villa San Martino.

Arcore is also the place where the sausage company Molteni founded their successful cycling team of the 1970’s featuring Eddy Merckx.

== Twin towns ==
Arcore is twinned with:

- Corinaldo, Italy
