= Monza–Molteno railway =

Railway line in Lombardy, Italy

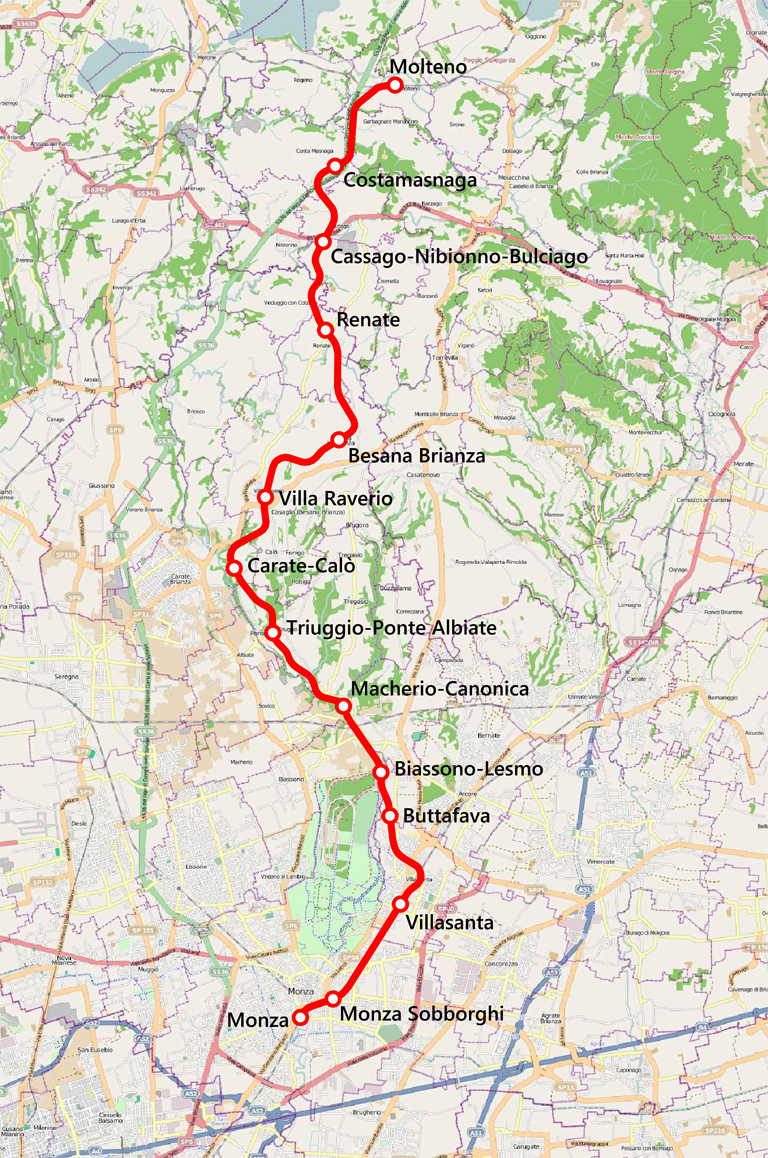

Overview
- Native name: Ferrovia Monza-Molteno
- Status: in use
- Owner: RFI
- Line number: 27
- Locale: Lombardy, Italy
- Termini: Monza railway station; Molteno railway station
- Stations: 14

Service
- Type: heavy rail
- Services: S7
- Route number: R19
- Operator(s): Trenord

History
- Opened: 14 October 1911

Technical
- Line length: 29 km (18 mi)
- Number of tracks: 1
- Track gauge: 1,435 mm (4 ft 8 1/2 in) standard gauge
- Electrification: no

The Monza–Molteno railway is a railway line in Lombardy, Italy.

The line was opened as a private railway on 14 October 1911.

The only train service is the S7 Milano-Monza-Molteno-Lecco line of Milan suburban railway service.

Monza is connected to Lecco with another railway, the main railway Milano-Monza-Carnate-Lecco, shorter and faster with a larger number of trains; Milano-Monza-Molteno-Lecco train ("Treno dei Tre Parchi", Train of the Three Parks) runs through a longer, slower route across the hilly area of Brianza - Colli Briantei - the countryside, near beautiful meadows, torrents and rivers, woods, fields, small lake and high mountains close to Lecco, and old small towns with palaces of nobility and places of history, culture, and art.

== See also ==
- List of railway lines in Italy
