= Monza railway station =

Railway station in Monza, Lombardy, Italy

Monza
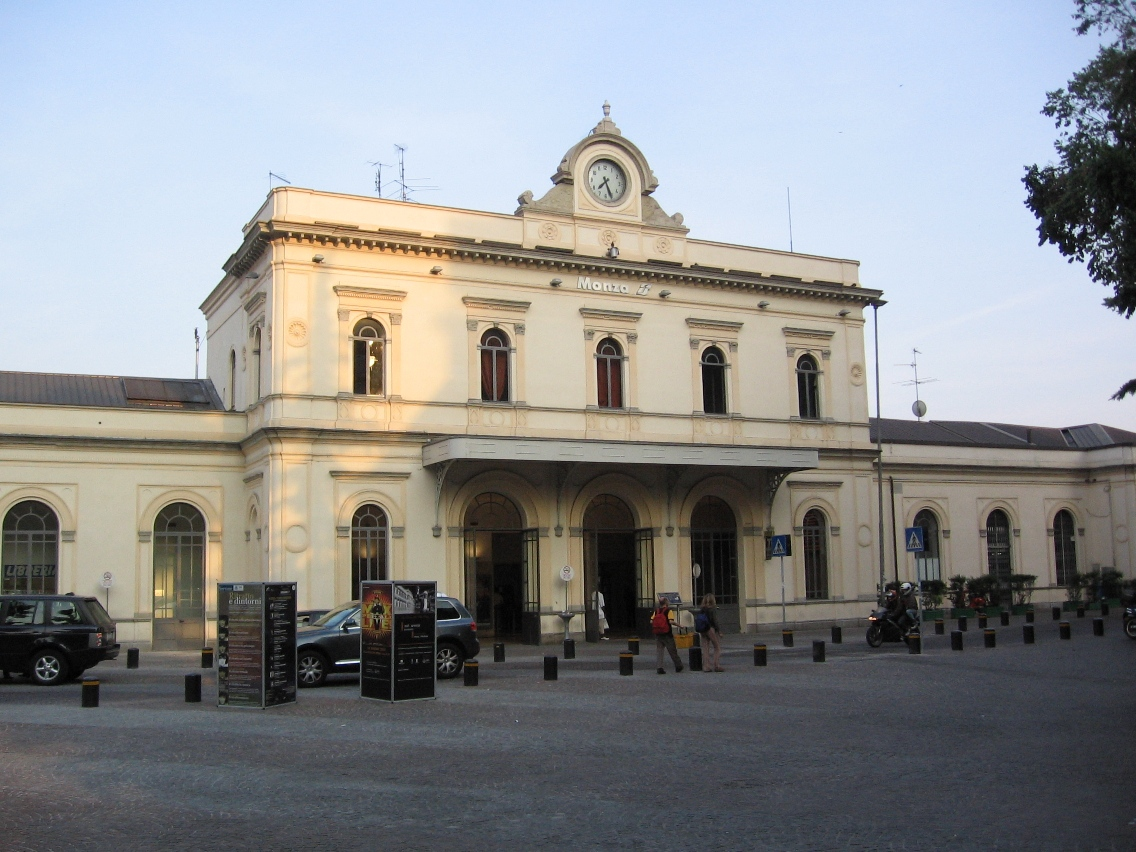
- The passenger building

General information
- Location: Via Enrico Arosio 14; 20052 Monza; Monza, Monza and Brianza, Lombardy; Italy
- Coordinates: 45°34′34″N 09°16′20″E
- Operator: Rete Ferroviaria Italiana; Centostazioni
- Lines: Milano–Chiasso; Lecco–Milan; Monza–Molteno–Lecco
- Distance: 11.934 km (7.415 mi) from Milano Centrale; 12.575 km (7.814 mi) from Milano Porta Garibaldi
- Train operators: Trenord
- Connections: Local buses

Other information
- Fare zone: STIBM: Mi4
- Classification: Gold

History
- Opened: 17 August 1840; 186 years ago

Services
| Preceding station | Trenord | Following station |
|---|---|---|
| Sesto San Giovanni towards Milano Porta Garibaldi | Line S7 (Milan suburban railway service) | Monza Sobborghi towards Lecco |
| Sesto San Giovanni towards Milano Porta Garibaldi | Line S8 (Milan suburban railway service) | Arcore towards Lecco |
| Sesto San Giovanni towards Albairate–Vermezzo | Line S9 (Milan suburban railway service) | Lissone–Muggiò towards Saronno |
| Sesto San Giovanni towards Rho | Line S11 (Milan suburban railway service) | Lissone–Muggiò towards Chiasso |
Location
- Location within Lombardy Location within Northern Italy Location within Italy

Monza railway station (Italian: Stazione di Monza) is the main station serving the city and comune of Monza, in the region of Lombardy, northern Italy.

Opened in 1840 under the Habsburg monarchy, the station forms part of the Milan–Chiasso railway and is a junction station for two secondary lines, the Lecco–Milan railway and the Monza–Molteno–Lecco railway. It is also the main railway junction of the Brianza geographical area, which encompasses the province of Monza and Brianza, Province of Lecco, Province of Como and part of the Province of Milan.

The station is currently managed by Rete Ferroviaria Italiana (RFI). However, the commercial area of the passenger building is managed by Centostazioni. Both companies are subsidiaries of Ferrovie dello Stato Italiane (FS), Italy's state-owned rail company.

Train services are operated by the Lombard railway company Trenord.

== Location ==
Monza railway station is located on Via Enrico Arosio, at the southern edge of the city centre.

== History ==
The station was officially opened on 17 August 1840, as the terminus of the Milan–Monza railway, which was the first railway built in Lombardy and the second in Italy, after the Naples–Portici railway. Operations commenced the following day, 18 August 1840. In July 1849, that line was extended to Camnago-Lentate, on its way to becoming the Milan–Chiasso railway.

On 27 December 1873, Monza became a junction station, upon the opening of the final section of the Lecco–Milan railway, between Carnate-Usmate and Monza.

The original passenger building was replaced with the present one in 1884, when the station was moved to a new location. In 1901, the original passenger building was demolished to facilitate the construction of the Via Turati bridge.

On 19 October 1911, Monza also became the terminus of another secondary line, the Monza–Molteno–Lecco railway.

== Features ==
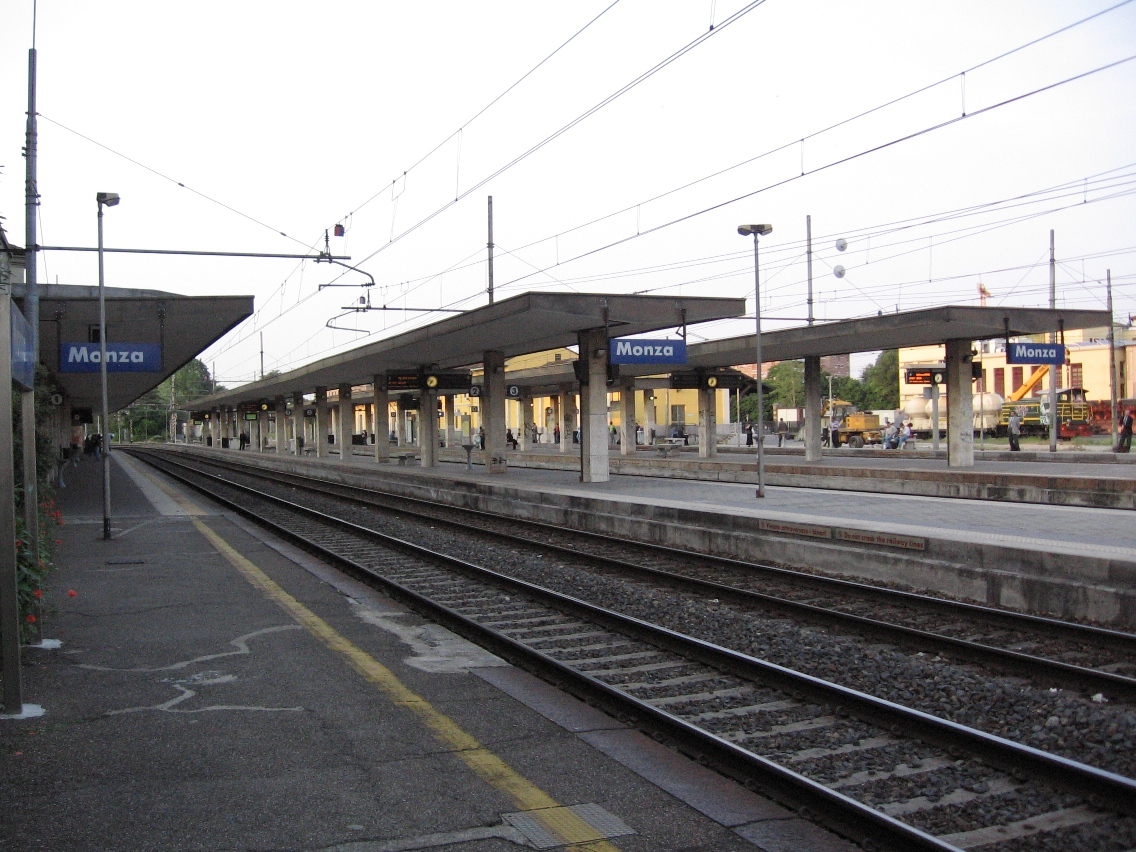
The station yard.

The station yard consists of seven tracks: 1 and 2 for Chiasso, 3 is shared between the Chiasso–Milan and Lecco–Milan railways, 4 and 5 on the Milan-Lecco railway only (for Tirano), and 6 (as the main platform) and 7 (as the overtaking platform) for the Monza-Molteno-Lecco line.

The station also has a freight terminal that serves, amongst other things, the nearby storage area of the former Lombard Petroli, at Villasanta.

== Train services ==
The station has about seven million passenger movements each year. It is served by the following services:

Regional express services (Treno RegioExpress), which call only at more important stations and run once per hour per direction:

- RE80: Locarno - Chiasso - Como - Seregno - Monza - Milan Central Station
- RE8: Tirano - Sondrio - Lecco - Monza - Milan Central station, which also run a few peak hour services limited between Lecco and Milan Regional services (Treno regionale):
- R18: Milan - Monza - Ponte S.Pietro - Bergamo, which call at every station and run once per hour per direction (twice per hour at peak times in the peak direction)

Suburban services (Treno suburbano), calling at every station, which call at every station and run twice per hour per direction (a part from S7, which, because of its single-tracked nature, runs a similar schedule to R18):

- S7: Lecco - Molteno - Monza - Milan Porta Garibaldi
- S8 Lecco - Calolziocorte - Carnate - Monza - Milan Porta Garibaldi
- S9: Saronno - Seregno - Monza - Milan belt line - Albairate-Vermezzo
- S11: (Chiasso) - Como - Seregno - Monza - Milan Porta Garibaldi - (Rho)

== Interchange ==
The station is connected with the Milan suburban railway network by Lines S7, S8, S9, and S11. It also has a bus terminal for local buses. In the future, the station will be connected to the Milan metro network via Line 5.

== See also ==
- History of rail transport in Italy
- List of railway stations in Lombardy
- Rail transport in Italy
- Railway stations in Italy
