= Line S14 (Milan suburban railway service) =

Suburban railway service in Milan, Italy

Rho-Milano Rogoredo
- S14

Overview
- Status: Defunct
- Locale: Milan, Italy
- Termini: Rho; Milano Rogoredo
- Stations: 11
- Website: Trenord (in Italian)

Service
- Type: Commuter rail
- System: Milan suburban railway service
- Route number: S14

History
- Opened: 26 April 2015
- Closed: November 2015

Technical
- Track gauge: 1,435 mm (4 ft 8 1/2 in)
- Electrification: 3,000 V DC

The S14 was a commuter rail route forming part of the Milan suburban railway service (Italian: Servizio ferroviario suburbano di Milano), serving the city of Milan, Italy, and surrounding areas.

The route ran over the infrastructure of the Milan Passante and Porto Ceresio–Milan. Like all but one of the other Milan suburban railway service routes, it was operated by Trenord.

== Route ==
- Milano Rogoredo ↔ Rho

Line S14, a cross-city route, heads initially in a southeasterly direction to Milan. The line runs through the municipality of Milan, via the Milan Passante railway, to Milano Rogoredo, final destination.

== History ==
The route was activated on 26 April 2015 for Expo 2015. It closed down in November 2015, but will be restored in the future when the western extension to Magenta opens.

== Stations ==
The stations on the S14 are as follows (the stations with a coloured background are within the municipality of Milan):

Station	Opened	Interchange	Note
Rho	1858	Line S6 Treni regionali	
Rho Fiera Expo Milano 2015	2008	Line M1 Treni regionali	
Milano Certosa	1858		
Milano Villapizzone	2002		
Milano Lancetti	1997	Line S1 Line S2 Line S13	
Milano Porta Garibaldi	1963	MXP	
Milano Repubblica	1997	Line M3 Line S1 Line S2 Line S13	
Milano Porta Venezia	1997	Line M1 Line S1 Line S2 Line S13	
Milano Dateo	2002	Line S1 Line S2 Line S13	
Milano Porta Vittoria	2004	Line S1 Line S2 Line S13	
Milano Rogoredo		Line M3 Line S9 Treni regionali	

== Scheduling ==
As of 2015, S14 trains ran hourly between 08:49 and 00:02 Monday to Saturday.

== See also ==
- History of rail transport in Italy
- List of Milan suburban railway stations
- Rail transport in Italy
- Transport in Milan
