= Line S6 (Milan suburban railway service) =

Suburban rail service in Milan

Novara–Milano Passante–Treviglio
- S6
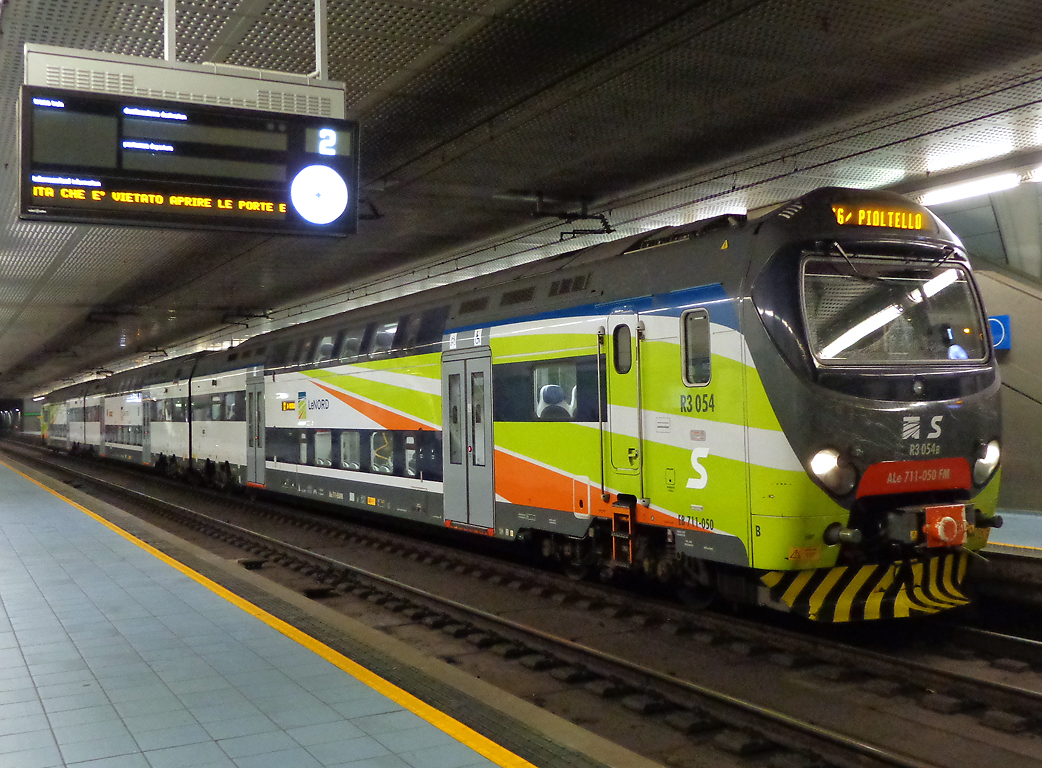
- An S6 train at Milano Porta Venezia.

Overview
- Status: Operational
- Locale: Milan, Italy
- Termini: Novara; Treviglio
- Stations: 25
- Website: Trenord (in Italian)

Service
- Type: Commuter rail
- System: Milan suburban railway service
- Route number: S6
- Operator(s): Trenord
- Rolling stock: TAF / TSR
- Daily ridership: 34,000 (2011)

History
- Opened: 2004

Technical
- Line length: 84 km (52 mi)
- Track gauge: 1,435 mm (4 ft 8 1/2 in)
- Electrification: 3,000 V DC
Route map
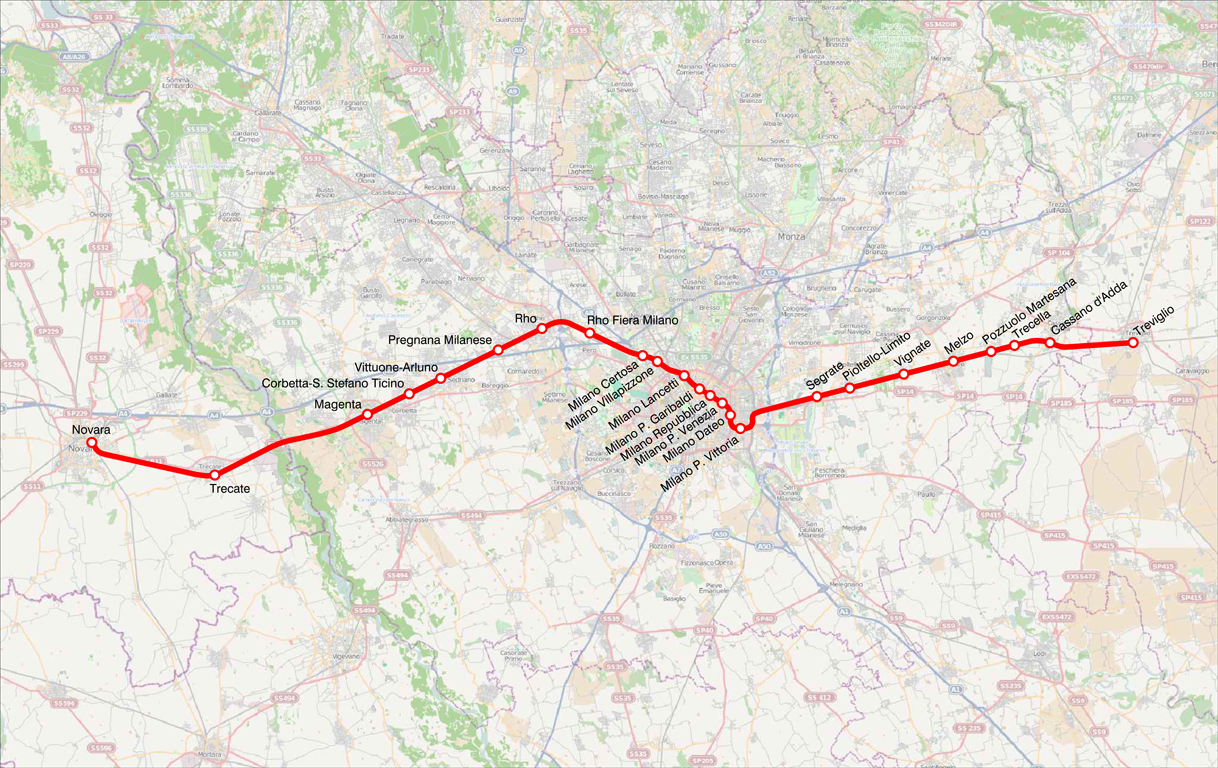
Map of line S6.

The S6 is a commuter rail route forming part of the Milan suburban railway service (Italian: Servizio ferroviario suburbano di Milano), which converges on the city of Milan, Italy.

The route runs over the infrastructure of the Turin–Milan, Milan Passante and Milan–Venice railways. Like all the other Milan suburban railway service routes, it is operated by Trenord.

== Route ==
Line S6, a cross-city route, heads initially in an easterly direction from Novara to Rho Fiera Milano. From there, it runs through the municipality of Milan, via the Milan Passante railway, to Milano Porta Vittoria, and finally in an easterly direction to Treviglio. The travel takes 1h47'.

== History ==
The S6 was activated on 12 December 2004, and operated initially between Novara and Milano Porta Vittoria.

With the change of timetable on 15 June 2008, the line was extended from Milano Porta Vittoria to Milano Rogoredo, where there is interchange with regional trains and long-distance services to and from Genoa, Bologna and Mantua.

Coinciding with another timetable change on 13 December 2009, the Porta Vittoria to Rogoredo section was closed, but the southern end of the route was extended in that section's place, from Porta Vittoria to Pioltello-Limito (and during rush hour to Treviglio).

== Stations ==
The stations on the S6 are as follows (stations with blue background are in the municipality of Milan):

| Station | Interchange | Note |
|---|---|---|
| Novara | Treni regionali | Novara Nord 100 m/yds |
| Trecate | | |
| Magenta | Treni regionali | |
| Corbetta-Santo Stefano Ticino | | |
| Vittuone-Arluno | | |
| Pregnana Milanese | | |
| Rho | Line S5 (Milan suburban railway service) | |
| Rho Fiera | Line M1 Line S11 Treni regionali | |
| Milano Certosa | Line S11 | |
| Milano Villapizzone | Line S11 | |
| Milano Lancetti | Line S11 Line S12 Line S13 | |
| Milano Porta Garibaldi | MXP | |
| Milano Repubblica | Line M3 Line S12 Line S13 | |
| Milano Porta Venezia | Line M1 Line S12 Line S13 | |
| Milano Dateo | Line S12 Line S13 | |
| Milano Porta Vittoria | Line S12 Line S13 | |
| Milano Forlanini | Milan Metro Line 4 Line S5 (Milan suburban railway service) Line S9 (Milan suburban railway service) | |
| Segrate | Line S5 (Milan suburban railway service) | |
| Pioltello-Limito | Treni regionali | |
| Vignate | Line S5 (Milan suburban railway service) | Only during rush hour. |
| Melzo | Line S5 (Milan suburban railway service) | Only during rush hour. |
| Pozzuolo Martesana | Line S5 (Milan suburban railway service) | Only during rush hour. |
| Trecella | Line S5 (Milan suburban railway service) | Only during rush hour. |
| Cassano d'Adda | Line S5 (Milan suburban railway service) | Only during rush hour. |
| Treviglio | Treni regionali | Only during rush hour. |

== Rolling stock ==
S6 trains are made up of 5, 6 or 8-car Treno ad alta frequentazione (TAF) or Treno Servizio Regionale (TSR) train sets.

== Scheduling ==
As of 2012, S6 trains ran every half-hour between 06:00 and 00:30 daily.

From 07:00 to 09:00, and from 17:00 to 20:00, S6 services cover the entire route between Novara and Treviglio. During the rest of the day, S6 trains are limited to Novara–Pioltello-Limito, except between 10:00 to 12:00, when some S6 trains operate only between Novara and Milano Certosa.

== See also ==
- History of rail transport in Italy
- List of Milan suburban railway stations
- Rail transport in Italy
- Transport in Milan
