= Milano Repubblica railway station =

Railway station in Milan, Italy

Milano Repubblica
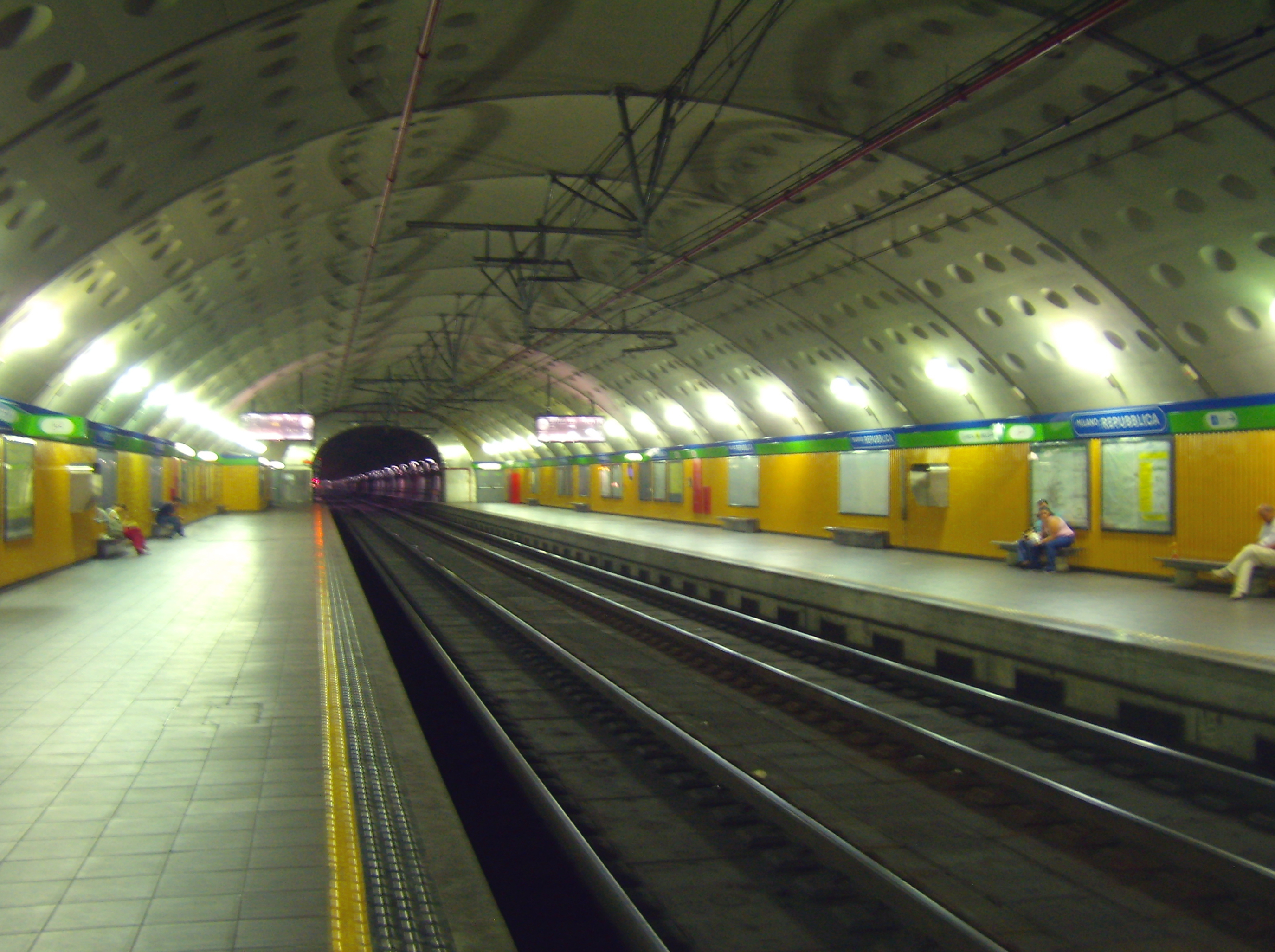

General information
- Location: Piazza Repubblica; Milan, Milan, Lombardy; Italy
- Coordinates: 45°28′44″N 09°11′50″E
- Owner: Rete Ferroviaria Italiana
- Operator: Trenord
- Line: Passante
- Distance: 7.322 km (4.550 mi) from Bivio Lambro
- Platforms: 2
- Tracks: 2
- Connections: Repubblica MM; ATM trams; ATM buses

Construction
- Structure type: Underground
- Architect: Angelo Mangiarotti

Other information
- Fare zone: STIBM: Mi1
- Classification: Silver

History
- Opened: 21 December 1997; 28 years ago

Services
| Preceding station | Trenord | Following station |
|---|---|---|
| Milano Porta Garibaldi towards Saronno | Line S1 (Milan suburban railway service) | Milano Porta Venezia towards Lodi |
| Milano Porta Garibaldi towards Mariano Comense | Line S2 (Milan suburban railway service) | Milano Porta Venezia towards Milano Rogoredo |
| Milano Porta Garibaldi towards Varese | Line S5 (Milan suburban railway service) | Milano Porta Venezia towards Treviglio |
| Milano Porta Garibaldi towards Novara | Line S6 (Milan suburban railway service) | Milano Porta Venezia towards Treviglio |
| Milano Porta Garibaldi towards Cormano–Cusano Milanino | Line S12 (Milan suburban railway service) | Milano Porta Venezia towards Melegnano |
| Milano Porta Garibaldi towards Milano Bovisa | Line S13 (Milan suburban railway service) | Milano Porta Venezia towards Pavia |
Location
- Location within Milan Location within Lombardy Location within Northern Italy Location within Italy

Milano Repubblica is an underground railway station in Milan, Italy. It is on the Milan Passante railway and is located at Piazza della Repubblica, in the same location of the old pre-fascist Central Station.

== Services ==
Milano Repubblica is served by lines S1, S2, S5, S6, S12, and S13 of the Milan suburban railway network, operated by the Lombard railway company Trenord.

== See also ==
- Railway stations in Milan
- Milan suburban railway network
- Milan Passante railway
