= Milano Porta Venezia railway station =

Railway station in Milan, Italy

Milano Porta Venezia
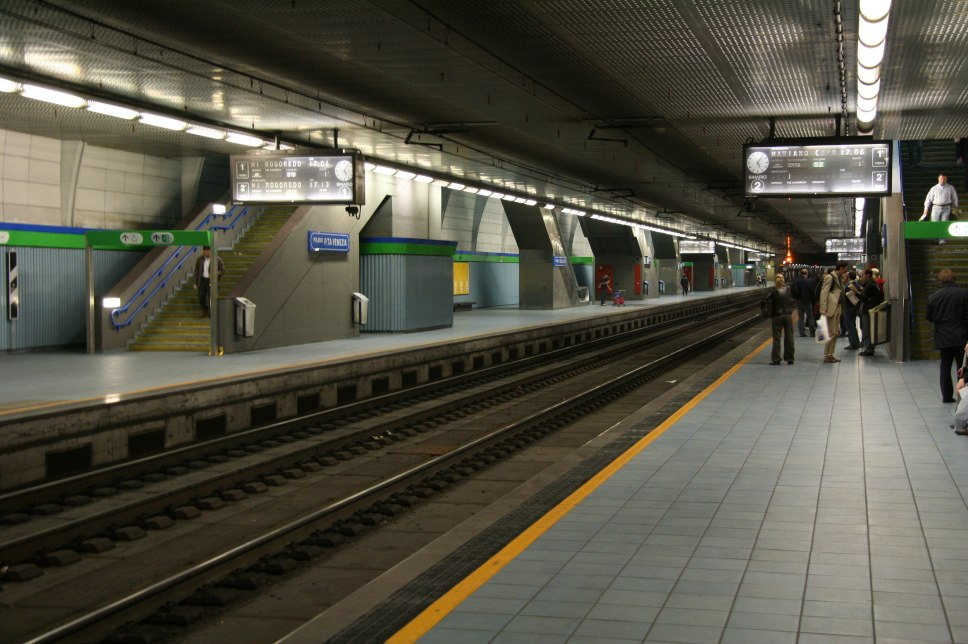

General information
- Location: Corso Buenos Aires, Milan; Italy
- Coordinates: 45°28′32″N 09°12′22″E
- Owner: Rete Ferroviaria Italiana
- Operator: Trenord
- Line: Passante
- Distance: 6.376 km (3.962 mi) from Bivio Lambro
- Platforms: 2
- Tracks: 2
- Connections: Porta Venezia MM

Construction
- Structure type: Underground
- Architect: Angelo Mangiarotti

Other information
- Fare zone: STIBM: Mi1

History
- Opened: 21 December 1997

Services
| Preceding station | Trenord | Following station |
|---|---|---|
| Milano Repubblica towards Saronno | Line S1 (Milan suburban railway service) | Milano Dateo towards Lodi |
| Milano Repubblica towards Mariano Comense | Line S2 (Milan suburban railway service) | Milano Dateo towards Milano Rogoredo |
| Milano Repubblica towards Varese | Line S5 (Milan suburban railway service) | Milano Dateo towards Treviglio |
| Milano Repubblica towards Novara | Line S6 (Milan suburban railway service) | Milano Dateo towards Treviglio |
| Milano Repubblica towards Cormano–Cusano Milanino | Line S12 (Milan suburban railway service) | Milano Dateo towards Melegnano |
| Milano Repubblica towards Milano Bovisa | Line S13 (Milan suburban railway service) | Milano Dateo towards Pavia |
Location
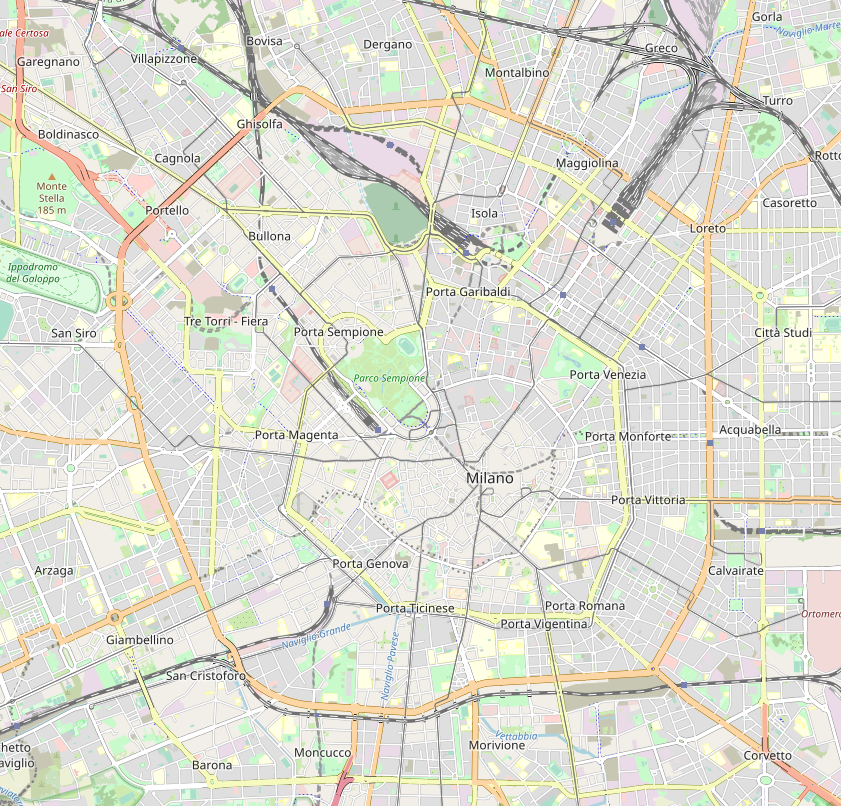
- Location within Milan Location within Lombardy Location within Northern Italy Location within Italy

Milano Porta Venezia is an underground railway station in Milan, Italy. It is on the Milan Passante railway and is located near Corso Buenos Aires.

== Services ==
Milano Porta Venezia is served by lines S1, S2, S5, S6, S12, and S13 of the Milan suburban railway network, operated by the regional railway company Trenord.

== See also ==
- Railway stations in Milan
- Milan suburban railway network
- Milan Passante railway
