= S14 =

S14 may refer to:

== Aircraft ==
- Fokker S.14 Machtrainer, a Dutch jet trainer
- Letov Š-14, a Czechoslovak fighter
- Rans S-14 Airaile, an American civil utility aircraft
- Short S.14 Sarafrand, a British biplane flying boat
- Sikorsky S-14, a Russian aircraft design proposal

== Automobiles ==
- BMW S14, an automobile engine
- Nissan Silvia (S14), a Japanese sports car
- Nissan 240SX (S14), a sports car sold in North America

== Rail and transit ==
=== Lines ===
- S14 (St. Gallen S-Bahn), in Thurgau, Switzerland
- S14 (ZVV), in Zurich and Zug, Switzerland
- S14, an Aargau S-Bahn line, Switzerland
- Line S14 (Milan suburban railway service)

=== Locomotives ===
- LSWR S14 class, a steam locomotive

=== Stations ===
- Aratama-bashi Station, in Mizuho-ku, Nagoya, Aichi Prefecture, Japan
- Gakuen-Toshi Station, in Kobe, Hyōgo Prefecture, Japan
- Iyo-Shirataki Station, in Ōzu, Ehime Prefecture, Japan
- Minami-Otaru Station, in Otaru, Hokkaido, Japan
- Nishi-Nagahori Station, in Nishi-ku, Osaka, Japan
- Nishi-ojima Station, in Kōtō, Tokyo, Japan

== Roads ==
- Expressway S14 (Poland)
- County Route S14 (California), United States

== Science ==
- 40S ribosomal protein S14
- British NVC community S14, a swamps and tall-herb fens community in the British National Vegetation Classification system
- S14: Keep away from ... (incompatible materials to be indicated by the manufacturer), a safety phrase
- S14, a star orbiting Sagittarius A*

== Vessels ==
- Brazilian submarine Ceará (S14)
- HMCS Raccoon (S14), an armed yacht of the Royal Canadian Navy
- HMS Onslaught (S14), a submarine of the Royal Navy
- SMS S14 (1912), a torpedo boat of the Imperial German Navy
- USS S-14 (SS-119), a submarine of the United States Navy

== Other uses ==
- S14 (classification), a Paralympic swimming disability classification for intellectually disabled athletes
- S14 (Ukrainian group), a radical nationalist group in Ukraine
- S14, a postcode district in Sheffield, England
