= Transport in Milan =

Logos of Milan's transportation system

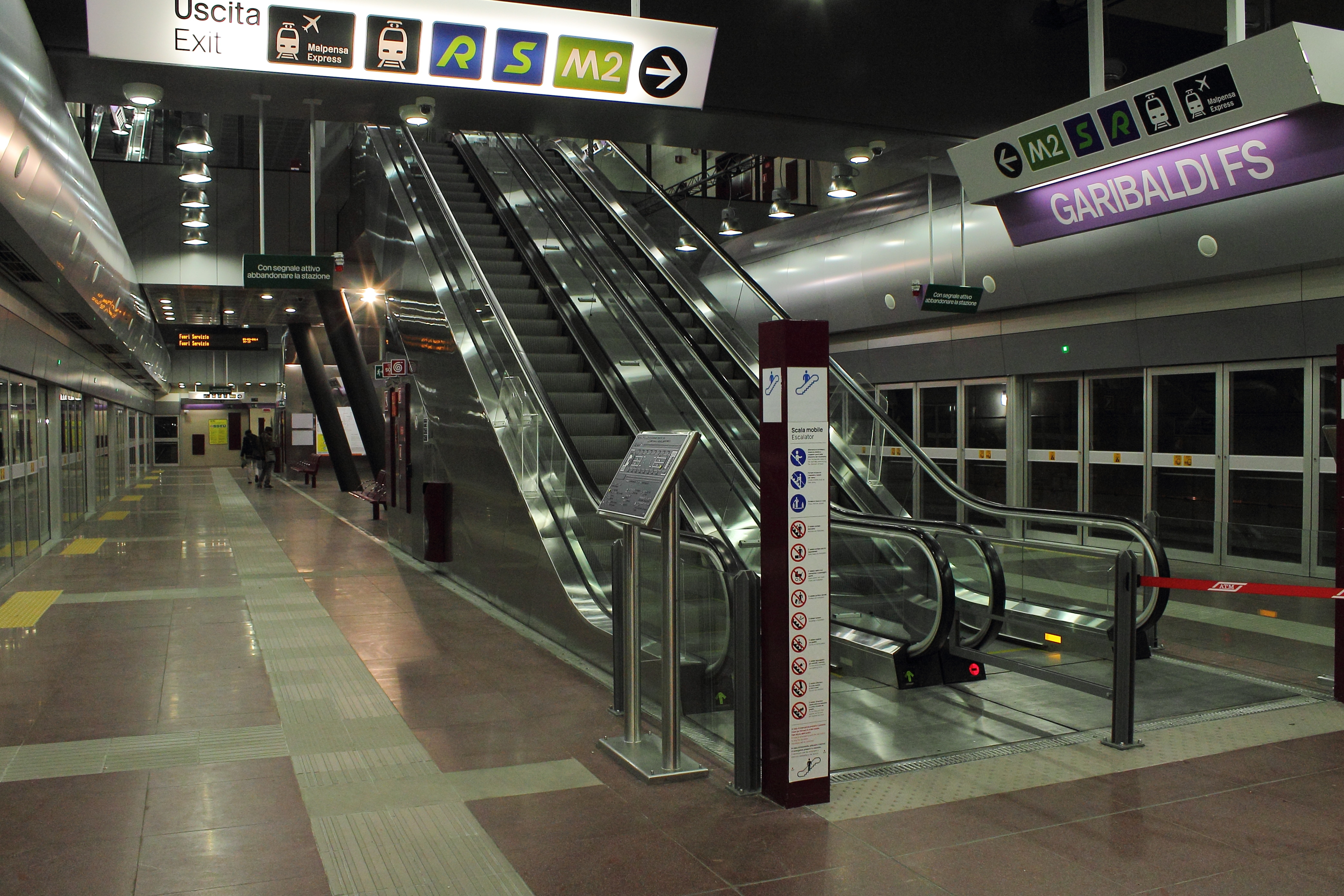
Milan Metro Line 5 at Garibaldi FS station

Milan has an extensive internal transport network and is also an important transportation node in Italy, being one of the country's biggest hubs for air, rail and road networks. Internal public transport network includes the Metro, the Suburban Railway, the tram and bus network, as well as taxi, car and bike sharing services.

== History ==
Early public transport service in Milan dates back to 1801, operated with horse-drawn carriages. After the relocation of the capital of the Italian Kingdom to Milan in 1805, national and international transport services were inaugurated, all operated with carriages, to Vienna, Marseille and several Italian cities. Transport via the Navigli canals was also an important transport mode in that period.

The first bus line was opened in 1827, connecting Milan to Lodi. The first railway, to Monza, was inaugurated in 1840. It is currently part of the Milan-Chiasso international railway.

== Public transportation ==
=== Metro ===
Metro map

The Milan Metro is a rapid transit system, running mainly underground, serving Milan and other surrounding cities. The network consists of 5 lines, identified by different colors and numbers:

Line	Length (km)	Length (mi)	Stations
Milan Metro Line 1	26.9	16.7	38
Milan Metro Line 2	39.4	24.5	35
Milan Metro Line 3	16.7	10.4	21
Milan Metro Line 4	15.2	9.4	21
Milan Metro Line 5	12.9	8.0	19

Milan Metro has a total length of 112 km (70 mi), serving 135 stations, making it the longest metro network in Italy. The system carries about 1.15 million passengers per day.

=== Suburban rail ===
Suburban railway network map

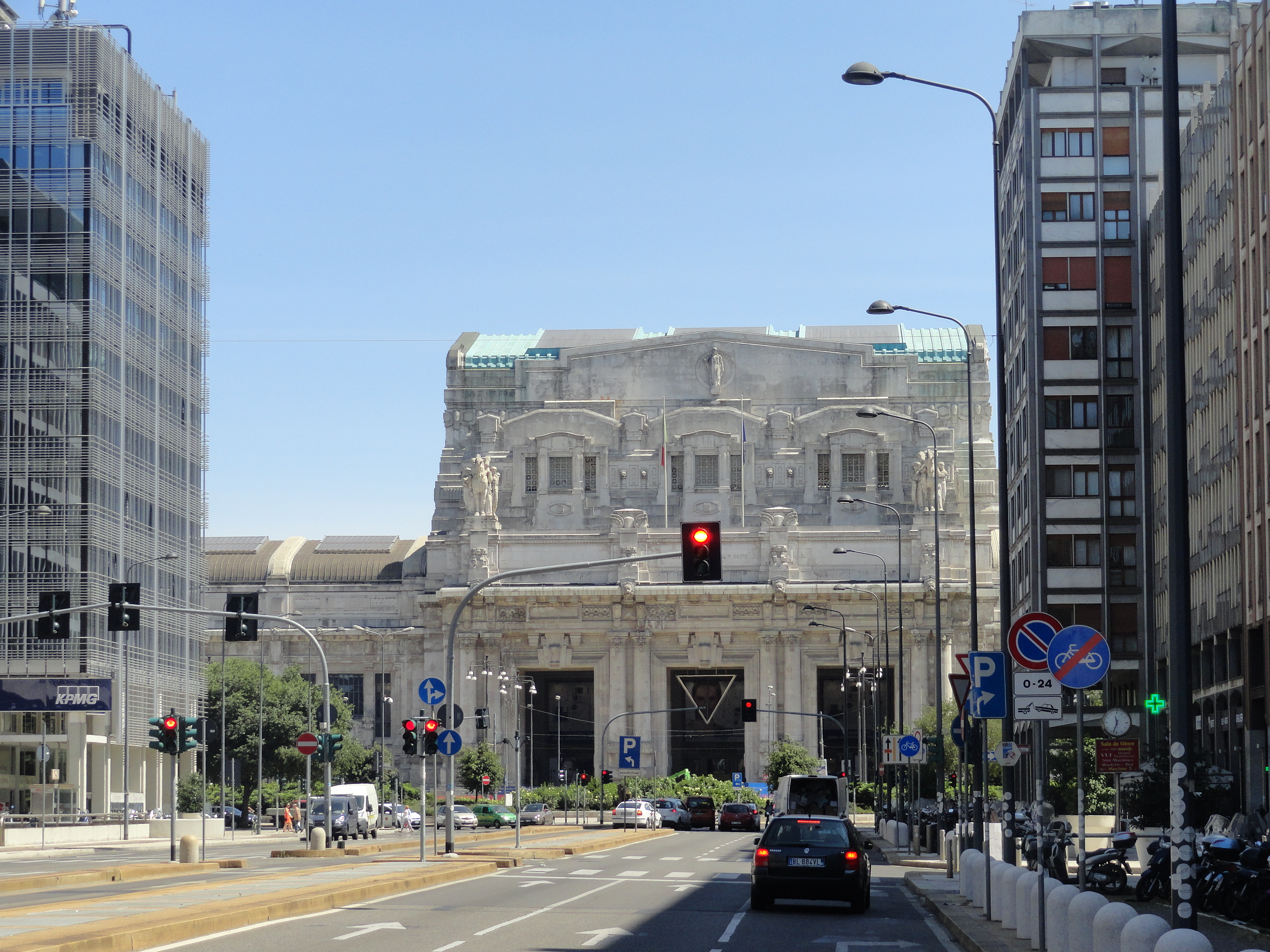
Milan Central station

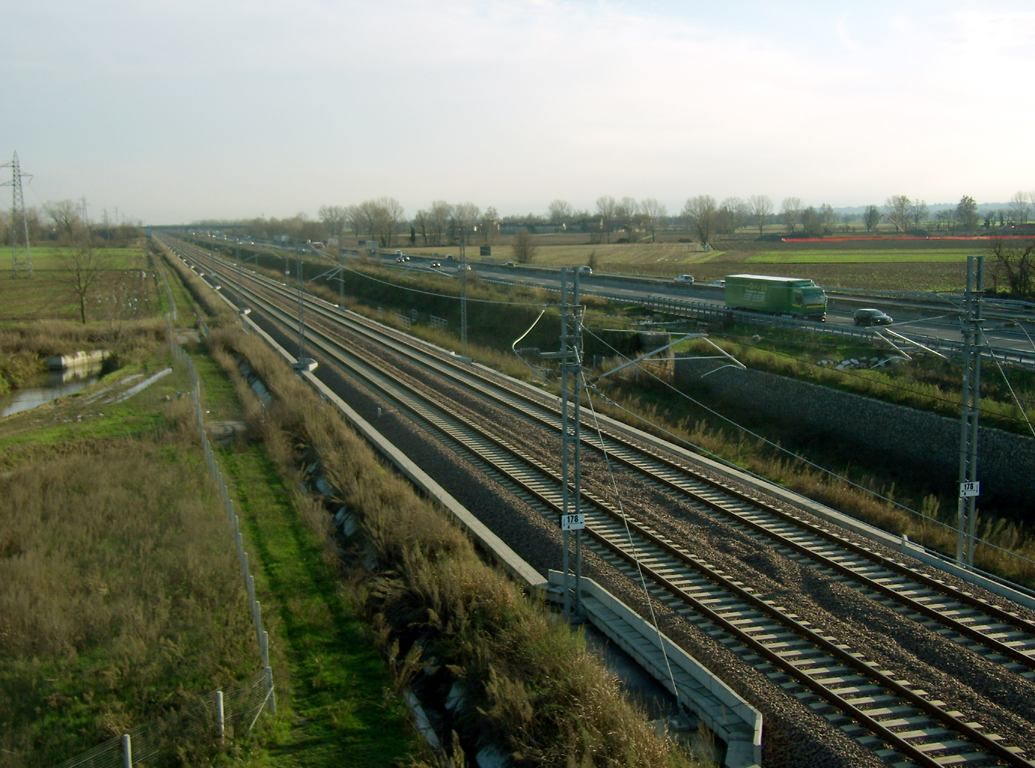
Milan–Bologna high-speed railway runs mostly parallel to the Milan-Naples highway

The suburban railway service consists of 13 lines connecting Milan to the greater metropolitan area:

Line S1 (Milan suburban railway service)	Saronno – Milano (Passante) – Lodi
Line S2 (Milan suburban railway service)	Milano (Rogoredo) – Milano (Passante) – Mariano Comense
Line S3 (Milan suburban railway service)	Milano (Cadorna) – Saronno
Line S4 (Milan suburban railway service)	Milano (Cadorna) – Camnago
Line S5 (Milan suburban railway service)	Varese – Milano (Passante) – Treviglio
Line S6 (Milan suburban railway service)	Novara – Milano (Passante) – Pioltello ( – Treviglio)
Line S7 (Milan suburban railway service)	Milano (Garibaldi) – Monza – Molteno – Lecco
Line S8 (Milan suburban railway service)	Milano (Garibaldi) – Monza – Carnate – Lecco
Line S9 (Milan suburban railway service)	Saronno – Monza – Milano (Lambrate) – Albairate
Line S11 (Milan suburban railway service)	Rho – Milano (Garibaldi) – Monza – Chiasso
Line S12 (Milan suburban railway service)	Cormano - Cusano Milanino – Milano (Bovisa) – Melegnano
Line S13 (Milan suburban railway service)	Garbagnate Milanese – Milano (Passante) – Pavia
Line S19 (Milan suburban railway service)	Milano Rogoredo – Albairate-Vermezzo

The system was brought together from existing lines and the construction of the new Passante, an underground railway line passing through the city. The service began operation in 2004 and now comprises 124 stations. Several extensions are planned.

=== Trams ===
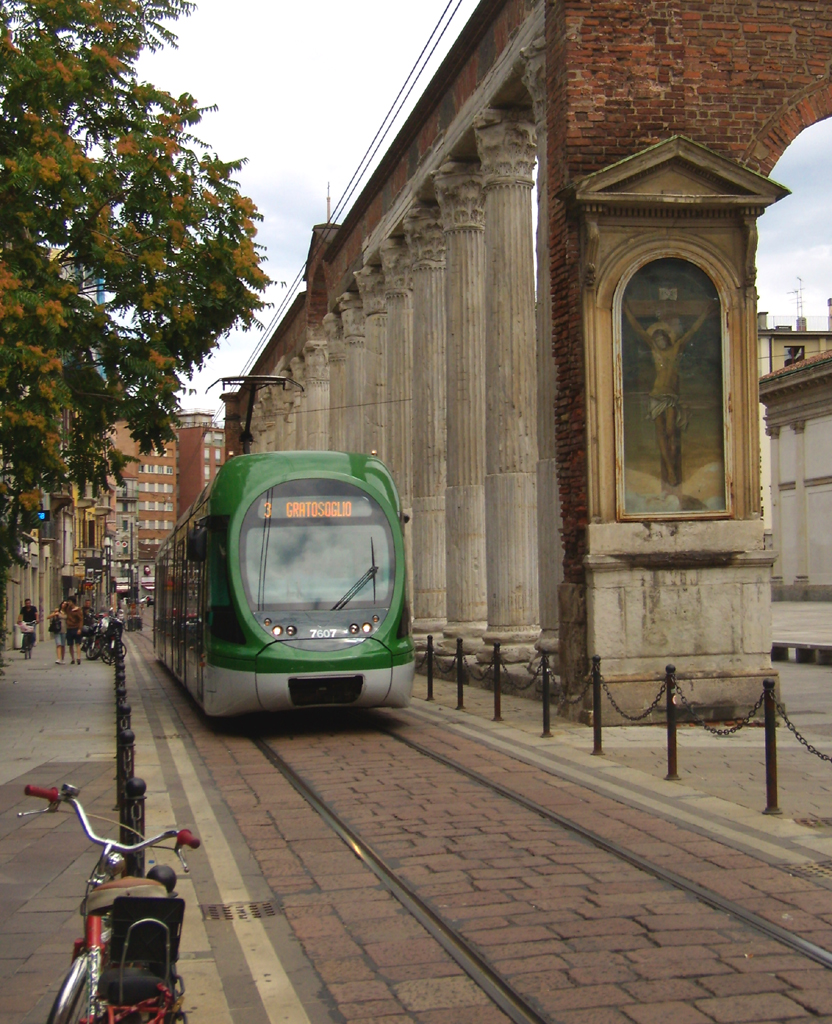
A modern "Sirio" tram in Milan, at "Colonne di San Lorenzo" ("St. Lawrence's Columns").

The Tram network comprises 17 urban lines. The system is more than 170 km long and is the biggest network in Italy.

The Milan tram network dates back to 1876, when the first horse driven tram line began operation. In 1878 the first steam powered tram was launched and by 1901 all the lines were electric powered. In 1910 line numbers were first introduced. At that time the network was already consisting of 30 lines. Until 1917 the tram system was operated by several different companies, however, since that year the municipality took control over the whole network.

In the 1920s the famous Class 1500 streetcars were introduced. Many of them, restored, are still in use today.

Beginning from the late 1950s and until the end of the 1970s the tram network was reduced, being replaced in some areas by the new Metro lines or by bus lines.

=== Buses ===
There are 65 bus and 4 trolleybus lines in Milan. Most of the routes do not run during the night, however, bus services on demand are available in the weekend at night.

Night bus lines during weekends were introduced on 24 September 2011, running from 2 am to 6 am on Fridays and Saturdays. The new network was considered a success, with more than 8,000 people using the lines every weekend.

List of urban bus lines in Milan
- 34 Via Toffetti - Quartiere Fatima
- 35 Molino Dorino M1 - Comasina M3
- 38 Via Corelli - Susa M4
- 39 Loreto M1 M2 - Via Pitteri
- 40 Bonola M1 - Niguarda (Parco Nord)
- 41 Quartiere Bovisasca - Niguarda
- 42 Quartiere Bicocca - Centrale FS M2 M3
- 43 Piazza Greco - Piazza Firenze
- 44 Cascina Gobba M2 - Quartiere Turro
- 45 Lambrate FS M2 - San Donato M3
- 46 Famagosta M2 - Quartiere Cantalupa
- 47 Bisceglie M1 - Romolo M2
- 48 Istituto Palazzolo - Lotto M1 M5
- 49 San Cristoforo FS M4 - San Carlo Hospital - Lotto M1 M5
- 50 Lorenteggio - Cairoli M1
- 51 Cimiano M2 - Sesto Marelli M1 - Niguarda Hospital - Zara M3 M5
- 52 Bruzzano FN - Greco FS / Bicocca University
- 53 Sesto Marelli M1 - Quartiere Adriano - Lambrate FS M2
- 54 Dateo M4 - Lambrate FS M2
- 54/ Dateo M4 - Lambrate FS M2 - Cascina Gobba M2
- 55 Lambrate Cemetery - Quartiere Feltre - Loreto M1 M2
- 55/ Segrate (Lavanderie) - Lambrate Cemetery - Quartiere Feltre - Loreto M1 M2
- 56 Quartiere Adriano - Loreto M1 M2
- 56/ Loreto M1 M2 - Crescenzago M2
- 57 Quarto Oggiaro - Cairoli M1
- 58 Baggio (Via Noale) - Bisceglie M1 - Piazzale Aquileia
- 59 Famagosta M2 - Porta Lodovica
- 60 Zara M3 M5 - Duomo M1 M3
- 61 Largo Murani - Duomo M1 M3
- 62 Piazza Sire Raul - Porta Romana M3
- 63 Muggiano - Quartiere degli Olmi - De Angeli M1
- 64 Bonola M1 - Lorenteggio
- 65 Abbiategrasso M2 - Porta Romana M3
- 67 Baggio (Via Scanini) - Bande Nere M1 - Piazzale Baracca
- 67/ Baggio (Via Scanini) - Bisceglie M1 (only peak hours from Monday to Friday)
- 68 Bonola M1 - Via Solari
- 69 Molino Dorino M1 - Gallaratese/San Leonardo M1 - Piazza Firenze
- 70 Bruzzano Cemetery - Monumentale M5
- 71 Romolo M2 - Famagosta M2 - Porta Lodovica
- 74 Famagosta M2 - Piazzale Cantore
- 76 Bisceglie M1 - Quinto Romano
- 77 Poasco (San Donato Milanese) - Chiaravalle Cemetery - Corvetto M3 - San Donato M3
- 78 Via Govone - Lotto M1 M5 - Bisceglie M1
- 79 Gratosoglio - Porta Lodovica
- 80 Molino Dorino M1 - Quinto Romano - De Angeli M1
- 81 Sesto Marelli M1 - Lambrate FS M2
- 82 Quartiere Bovisasca - Zara M3 M5
- 84 Porta Volta - Corvetto M3
- 85 Cadorna FN M1 M2 - Piazza Napoli
- 86 Ca' Granda M5 - Crescenzago M2
- 87 Centrale FS M2 M3 - Villa San Giovanni M1
- 87/ Centrale FS - Bicocca University (only peak hours from Monday to Friday)
- 88 Rogoredo FS M3 - Viale Ungheria - Peschiera Borromeo
- 88/ Rogoredo FS M3 - Viale Ungheria - Viale dell’Aviazione
- 96 Porta Volta - Largo Augusto - Cadorna FN M1 M2
- 97 Porta Volta - Largo Augusto - Cadorna FN M1 M2
- 95 Rogoredo FS M3 - Famagosta M2 - San Cristoforo FS M4
- 98 Lotto M1 M5 - Famagosta M2
- 99 Noverasco (Opera) - Vigentino
- 171 Inside Maggiore Cemetery
- 172 Bruzzano Cemetery - Bicocca M5
- 174 Quartiere Turro - Greco Cemetery - Loreto M1 M2
- 175 Lambrate Cemetery - Ponte Lambro
- 176 Inside Bruzzano Cemetery
- 180 Lampugnano M1 - San Siro Stadium M5
- 183 Linate Airport M4 - Idroscalo (only in Summer)

List of interurban bus lines in Milan operated by ATM Milan
- 66 Via Cadore - Peschiera Borromeo (Bettola)
- 83 Comasina M3 - Cormano - Bresso - Niguarda (Parco Nord) - Niguarda Hospital
- 83/ Comasina M3 - Cormano - Bresso - Niguarda (Parco Nord) (only on peak hours in the mornings and evenings)
- 89 Affori FN M3 - Novate Milanese (Via Stelvio)
- 121 San Donato M3 - San Giuliano Milanese FS
- 130 San Donato M3 - San Donato Milanese (Hospital) - San Giuliano Milanese (Zivido)
- 132 San Donato M3 - San Donato Milanese (Hospital) - San Donato (Via di Vittorio)
- 140 Rogoredo FS M3 - Poasco - Sesto Ulteriano - San Donato Milanese (Via Martiri di Cefalonia)
- 165 Comasina M3 - Limbiate (Hospital)
- 166 Zara M3 M5 - Niguarda (Parco Nord) - Desio (Hospital)
- 201 Rozzano (Via Alberelle) - Rozzano (Via Milano)
- 220 Rozzano (Via della Libertà) - Locate Triulzi (Via Piave)
- 222 Vigentino - Pieve Emanuele FS
- 230 Abbiategrasso M2 - Basiglio
- 321 Bisceglie M1 - Buccinasco - Assago Forum M2
- 322 Bisceglie M1 - Cesano Boscone (Quartiere Tessera)
- 323 Bisceglie M1 - Cesano Boscone FS
- 324 Romolo M2 - Corsico (Piazza Europa)
- 325 Romolo M2 - Buccinasco (Via Lario)
- 326 San Cristoforo FS M4 - Corsico (Via Curiel)
- 327 Bisceglie M1 - Trezzano sul Naviglio (Zingone) - Cusago (Via Baggio)
- 328 Pieve Emanuele FS - Assago Forum M2
- 351 Piazzale Negrelli - Buccinasco (Via Emilia)
- 352 Buccinasco (Via Romagna) - Assago Forum M2
- 353 Assago Nord M2 - Assago (Via del Sole)
- 423 San Siro Stadium M5 - Settimo Milanese (Via della Libertà)
- 424 Molino Dorino M1 - Bareggio (Via Gallina)
- 431 Bareggio - Rho (Passirana)
- 433 Bisceglie M1 - Rho (Passirana)
- 528 Maggiore Cemetery - Rho (Via Capuana)
- 542 Rho Fiera FS M1 - Rho (Passirana)
- 560 Qt8 M1 - Arese (Via Valera)
- 561 Rho Fiera FS M1 - Arese (Via Vismara)
- 566 Roserio (Sacco Hospital) - Paderno Dugnano FN
- 700 Sesto I Maggio FS M1 - Sesto San Giovanni (New Cemetery)
- 701 Sesto Rondò M1 - Cologno Sud M2
- 702 Cologno Nord M2 - Sesto I Maggio FS M1 - Cinisello Balsamo (Sant'Eusebio)
- 705 Cormano (Via Buonarroti) - Comasina M3
- 707 Cologno Nord M2 - Cologno Monzese (Via Giordano)
- 708 Sesto Rondò M1 - Niguarda (Parco Nord)
- 709 Cologno Sud M2 - Cologno Monzese (San Maurizio) (only from Monday to Friday)
- 712 Cinisello Balsamo (via Musu) - Sesto I Maggio FS M1
- 713 Bignami M5 - Sesto San Giovanni (Viale Rimembranze)
- 727 Sesto I Maggio FS M1 - Cinisello Balsamo (Hospital) - Cormano Cusano FN
- 728 Cusano Milanino (Viale Unione) - Cinisello Balsamo (Sant'Eusebio) - Bignami M5
- 729 Sesto I Maggio FS M1 - Cusano Milanino (Viale Marconi) - Comasina M3
- 783 Bresso (Via Don Minzoni) - Bicocca M5
- 901 San Donato M3 - Peschiera Borromeo - San Felice - Linate Airport M4
- 902 San Donato M3 - Peschiera Borromeo
- 903 San Donato M3 - Peschiera Borromeo - San Felice - Linate Airport M4
- 923 Cascina Gobba M2 - Linate Airport M4
- 923s Segrate (Via Di Vittorio) - Segrate (Istituti Scolastici) (only on peak hours from Monday to Friday in the mornings)
- 924 Lambrate FS M2 - Segrate (Piazza Sant'Ambrogio) - Cascina Burrona M2
- 925 Cascina Gobba M2 - Segrate (Milan 2) - Udine M2
- 926 Peschiera Borromeo (San Felicino) - Segrate FS
- 928 Cascina Gobba M2 - Segrate (Redecesio) (only from Monday to Friday)
- 965 Loreto M1 M2 - Pioltello (Via Milano)
- 973 Piazza Cinque Giornate - Linate Airport M4 - Peschiera Borromeo (San Felicino)

List of interurban bus lines in Milan operated by Autoguidovie
- 1 VERDE Calderara-Amendola-Cimitero-Municipio-Paderno FN (urban route of Paderno Dugnano)
- 2 BLU Paderno FN-Incirano-Palazzolo Milanese FN-Cassina Amata-Ospedale-Paderno FN (urban route of Paderno Dugnano)
- 3 ROSSA Villaggio Ambrosiano-ITC Da Vinci-Municipio-Paderno FN (urban route of Paderno Dugnano)
- 4 GIALLA Palazzolo Milanese FN-Bolivia-Manzoni Scuole (urban route of Paderno Dugnano)
- 52/53 Melzo Urban Circle Routes
- 83 Romolo M2-Opera-Pieve Emanuele-Siziano-Vidigulfo-Ceranova-Bornasco-Lardirago-Roncaro-Cura Carpignano-Albuzzano
- 94 Romolo M2-Opera-Locate di Triulzi-Bascape'-Carpiano-Landriano-Vidigulfo-Ceranova-Bornasco-Lardirago-Sant'Alessio con Vialone-San Genesio ed Uniti-Pavia
- 99 Famagosta M2-Binasco-Casarile-Vellezzo Bellini-Battuda-Marcignago Villaggio Europa
- 155 Famagosta M2-Opera-Locate di Triulzi-Carpiano-Landriano-Torrevecchia Pia-Marzano-Torre d'Arese-Magherno-Copiano-Vistarino-Filighera-Belgioioso
- 172 Romolo M2-Opera-Pieve Emanuele-Siziano-Vidigulfo-Bornasco-Zeccone-San Genesio-Pavia
- 175 Famagosta M2-Zibido San Giacomo-Binasco-Casarile-Rognano-Giussago-Vellezzo Bellini-Certosa di Pavia-Borgarello-Pavia
- C BLU San Donato M3-San Donato Milanese (Hospital)-San Donato M3 (urban route of San Donato Milanese)
- C ROSSA San Donato M3-San Donato Milanese (Hospital)-San Donato M3 (urban route of San Donato Milanese)
- C2 San Donato Milanese (via Martiri di Cefalonia)-San Donato Milanese (Poasco)(urban route of San Donato Milanese)
- D San Donato Milanese (Via di Vittorio)-San Donato Milanese (Monticello Cemetery) (urban route of San Donato Milanese)
- K511/K512 Piazza 5 Giornate-Segrate-Pioltello-Rodano-Liscate-Truccazzano-Rivolta d'Adda-Agnadello-Vailate
- K520 LOCAL San Donato M3-San Donato Milanese-Peschiera Borromeo-Settala-Mombretto e Vigliano di Mediglia-Tribiano-Paullo-Zelo Buon Persico-Spino d'Adda-Pandino-Palazzo Pignano-Crema FS
- K521 RAPID San Donato M3-San Donato Milanese-Crema FS
- K522 San Donato M3-San Donato Milanese-Peschiera Borromeo-Mediglia-Paullo-Zelo Buon Persico-Spino d'Adda-Pandino-Scannabue di Palazzo Pignano-Torlino Vimercati-Pieranica-Quintano-Trescore Cremasco-Casale Cremasco-Cremosano
- K523/K525 San Donato M3-San Donato Milanese-Peschiera Borromeo-Mediglia-Paullo-Zelo Buon Persico-Spino d'Adda-Pandino-Scannabue di Palazzo Pignano-Vaiano Cremasco-Bagnolo Cremasco-Crema FS
- K524 San Donato M3-San Donato Milanese-Peschiera Borromeo-Mediglia-Paullo-Zelo Buon Persico-Spino d'Adda-Pandino-Scannabue di Palazzo Pignano-Vaiano Cremasco-Bagnolo Cremasco-Chieve
- Smartbus Urban route for the town of Basiglio
- U201 Rozzano (Cassino Scanasio)-Rozzano (Quinto de Stampi)
- U220 Rozzano-Cascina Perseghetto di Rozzano-Ponte Sesto di Rozzano-Fizzonasco di Pieve Emanuele-Pieve Emanuele FS-Rose di Pieve Emanuele
- U222 Vigentino-Noverasco di Opera-Opera-Pieve Emanuele FS
- U230 Abbiategrasso M2- Gratosoglio-Ponte Sesto di Rozzano-Cascina Perseghetto di Rozzano-Basiglio (Milan 3)
- U328 Rose di Pieve Emanuele-Pieve Emanuele FS-Fizzonasco di Pieve Emanuele-Fizzonasco di Pieve Emanuele-Ponte Sesto di Rozzano-Rozzano-Assago Forum M2
- U423 [San Siro Stadium M5]-Quinto Romano-Seguro-Settimo Milanese
- U431 Bareggio-San Pietro all'Olmo-Cornaredo-Lucernate di Rho-Rho FS-Passirana di Rho
- U433 Bisceglie M1-Baggio-Seguro-Settimo Milanese-Vighignolo-Cornaredo-Lucernate di Rho-Rho FS-Passirana di Rho
- z203 Muggiò Prati-Monza FS-Brugherio-Cologno Nord M2
- z205 Limbiate (Hospital)-Varedo FN-Nova Milanese-Muggiò-Monza FS
- z209 Cesano Maderno FN-Bovisio Masciago-Desio-Nova Milanese-Muggiò-Lissone
- z219 Paderno Dugnano-Nova Milanese-Muggiò-Monza FS
- z221 Sesto I Maggio FS M1-Monza FS-Vedano al Lambro-Biassono-Macherio-Sovico-Albiate-Carate Brianza-Mariano Comense FN-Mariano Comense (Hospital)
- z222 Monza-San Fruttuoso-Cinisello Balsamo-Sesto I Maggio FS M1
- z225 Sesto I Maggio FS M1-Cinisello Balsamo-Nova Milanese
- z227 Monza (San Gerardo Hospital) -Lissone FS-Muggiò-Cinisello Balsamo-Sesto I Maggio FS M1
- z228 Seregno FS-Lissone-Monza FS
- z229 Paderno Dugnano (ITC Da Vinci)-Cusano Milanino-Cinisello Balsamo
- z231 Carate Brianza-Giussano Robbiano-Verano Brianza-Seregno FS-Desio
- z232 Desio-Seregno-Carate Brianza-Verano Brianza-Giussano Robbiano-Briosco-Veduggio con Colzano-Renate-Vergo-Villa Raverio-Casatenovo-Monticello Brianza
- z233 Triuggio-Albiate-Seregno FS
- z234 Vedano al Lambro-Biassono-Sovico-Macherio-Lissone-Muggiò
- z250 Lissone-Desio FS-Seregno-Cesano Maderno FN-Limbiate
- z251 Desio FS-Bovisio Masciago-Varedo-Senago-Limbiate-Cesano Maderno FN
- z401 Melzo-Vignate-Villa Fiorita M2
- z402 Cernusco sul Naviglio M2-Pioltello-San Felice
- z403 Gorgonzola M2-Melzo
- z404 Melzo FS-Pozzuolo Martesana-Inzago-Gessate M2
- z405 Gessate M2-Bellinzago Lombardo-Inzago-Pozzuolo Martesana-Cassano d'Adda-Treviglio FS
- z406 Trecella FS-Melzo-Pozzuolo Martesana-Bellinzago Lombardo-Gessate M2
- z407 Gorgonzola M2-Melzo-Liscate-Truccazzano-Cassano d'Adda
- z409 Caleppio-Settala-Rodano-Pioltello-San Felice-[Linate Airport M4]
- z410 San Donato M3-San Donato Milanese-Peschiera Borromeo-Bettolino e Vigliano di Mediglia-Pantigliate
- z411 San Donato M3-San Donato Milanese-Peschiera Borromeo-Bettolino e Vigliano di Mediglia-Pantigliate-Settale-Liscate-Melzo-Gorgonzola M2
- z412 San Donato M3-San Donato Milanese-Peschiera Borromeo-Mediglia-Paullo-Zelo Buon Persico-Merlino-Comazzo
- z413 San Donato M3-San Donato Milanese-Peschiera Borromeo-Mediglia-Tribbiano-Paullo
- z415 San Donato M3-San Donato Milanese-Peschiera Borromeo-Mediglia-Colturano-Dresano-Vizzolo Predabissi-Melegnano FS-Casalmaiocco-San Zenone al Lambro
- z418 San Zenone al Lambro FS-Casalmaiocco-Mulazzano-Melegnano FS
- z419 Paullo-Zelo Buon Persico-Merlino-Comazzo-Truccazzano-Liscate-Melzo FS-Gorgonzola M2
- z420 San Donato M3-San Donato Milanese-San Giuliano Milanese-Melegnano FS-Vizzolo Predabissi-Madonnina di Dresano-San Zenone al Lambro
- z431 Melegnano FS-Carpiano-Cerro al Lambro
- z432 Melegnano FS-Vizzolo Predabissi-Colturano-Dresano

List of interurban bus lines in Milan operated by LINE Lodi
- 1 San Donato M3-San Donato Milanese-San Giuliano Milanese-Melegnano-Vizzolo Predabissi-Tavazzano
- 8 San Donato M3-San Donato Milanese-San Giuliano Milanese-Melegnano-Riozzo-Cerro al Lambro-Mairano-Casaletto-Lodi Vecchio
- 9 Castelnuovo Bocca d'Adda-Caselle Landi-Santo Stefano Lodigiano-Corno Giovane-San Fiorano-Meleti-Maleo-Codogno-Casalpusterlengo-San Donato Milanese
- 12 San Donato M3-San Donato Milanese-Robbiano-Mediglia-Colturano-Balbiano di Colturano-Dresano-Madonnina-Mulazzano Cimitero-Cassino d'Alberi-Tribiano-Mulazzano-Cervignano d'Adda-Galgagnano-Arcagna-Lodi/Paullo
  - 18 San Donato M3-San Donato Milanese-Lodi-Secugnago-Zorlesco
  - 22/80b San Donato M3-San Donato Milanese-Montale-Pontenure-Cadeo-Cortemaggiore-Fiorenzuola d'Arda-Fidenza
  - 26/38b/86b San Donato M3-San Donato Milanese-Guardamiglio-San Rocco Piacentino-Piacenza FS-Piacenza (Piazzale Torino)
  - 28/88b San Donato Milanese-Casalpusterlengo-Codogno-Retegno-Fombio
  - 72b San Donato M3-San Donato Milanese-Lodi-Secugnago-Zorlesco-Casalpusterlengo-Codogno-Retegno-Fombio
- 60 San Donato M3-San Donato Milanese-San Giuliano Milanese-Melegnano-Carpiano-Pairana-Landriano-Torrevecchia Pia-Bascapè-Riozzo-Cerro al Lambro-Mairano-Casaletto Lodigiano-Sant'Angelo Lodigiano-Marudo-Valera Fratta
- 61 San Donato M3-San Donato Milanese-San Giuliano Milanese-Melegnano-Riozzo-Cerro al Lambro-Casaletto Lodigiano-Cusanina-Castiraga-Sant'Angelo Lodigiano-Inverno-Monteleone-Mirandolo Terme-Chignolo Po-Graffignano-San Colombano al Lambro-Ospedaletto Lodigiano-Somaglia/Codogno

List of interurban bus lines in Milan operated by PMT Pavia Milano Trasporti
- z501 Famagosta M2-Assago-Rozzano-Binasco-Casarile
- z509 Famagosta M2-Assago-Rozzano-Binasco-Pasturago-Calvignasco-Casurate Primo-Motta Visconti/Trivulzio
- z510 Famagosta M2-Assago-Rozzano-Lacchiarella-Turago Bordone-Basilica Bologna-Giussago Robbiano
- z515 Famagosta M2-Assago-Rozzano-Moirago-Zibido San Giacomo-San Pietro Cusico-San Giacomo-Binasco
- z516 Famagosta M2-Binasco-Santa Corinna-Noviglio-Rosate-Calvignasco-Casorate Primo-Motta Visconti-Bellate

List of interurban and seasonal long-distance bus lines in Milan operated by Autostradale

Airport Services:

- Milano Centrale-Aeroporto di Malpensa
- Milano Centrale-Aeroporto di Linate
- Milano Centrale-Aeroporto di Bergamo-Orio al Serio
- Milano Centrale-Vicolungo The Styles Outlet

Milan to Turin interurban route:

- Milano Lampugnano-Milano Molino Dorino-Milano Certosa-Rho-Arluno-Galliate-Novara-Santhià-Chivasso-Brandisso-Settimo Torinese-Torino Autostazione Corso Bolzano

Long-distance seasonal buses:

- Casatenovo-Arcore-Monza-Sesto San Giovanni FS/M1-Milano Lampugnano-Milano Porto di Mare-Lodi-Lido di Classe-Lido di Savio-Milano Marittima-Cervia-Pinarella-Tagliata-Cesenatico-Gatteo Mare-San Mauro Mare-Bellaria Cagnona-Bellaria Centro-Igea Marina-Torre Pedrera-Viserbella-Viserba-San Giuliano Mare-Rimini Piazza Marvelli
- Casatenovo-Arcore-Monza-Sesto San Giovanni FS/M1-Milano Lampugnano-Milano Porto di Mare-Lodi-Rimini Piazza Marvelli-Bellariva-Marebello-Rivazzurra-Miramare-Riccione-Misano Adriatico-Portoverde-Cattolica-Gabicce Mare
- Milano Lampugnano-Milano Porto di Mare-Lodi-Marina di Carrara-Marina di Massa-Cinquale-Forte dei Marmi-Fiumetto-Marina di Pietrasanta-Viareggio
- Milano Lampugnano-Milano Porto di Mare-Lodi-Lido di Spina-Lido degli Estensi-Porto Garibaldi-Lido degli Scacchi-Lido di Pomposa-Lido delle Nazioni-Lido Volano
- Milano Lampugnano-Milano Porto di Mare-Lodi-Piacenza-Cecina-Donoratico-San Vincenzo-Piombino (for the ferries to Portoferraio)
- Milano Lampugnano-Sesto San Giovanni FS/M1-Dalmine-Brescia-Tione-Villa Rendena-Iavré-Darè-Pinzolo-Madonna di Campiglio-Folgarida-Dimaro-Marilleva
- Milano Lampugnano-Sesto San Giovanni FS/M1-Dalmine-Brescia-Predazzo-Moena-Sorago-Vigo di Fassa-Pera-Campitello-Canazei-Penia
- Milano Lampugnano-Sesto San Giovanni FS/M1-Dalmine-Brescia-Brixen/Bressanone-St Lorenzen/San Lorenzo di Sebato-Brüneck/Brunico-Welsberg/Monguelfo-Toblach/Dobbiaco-Innichen/San Candido-Cortina d'Ampezzo
- Milano Lampugnano-Sesto San Giovanni FS/M1-Dalmine-Brescia-Tione-Comano Terme-Molveno-Andalo-Fai della Paganella
- Milano Lampugnano-Sesto San Giovanni FS/M1-Clusone-Rovetta-Castione-Bratto-Presolana-Dezzo-Vilminore-Barzesto-Schilpario

List of interurban bus lines in Milan operated by STAR and STIE Lodi

Services by STAR Lodi:

- Milano Piazza Aspromonte M1/M2-Segrate-Pioltello
- Milano San Donato M3-San Donato Milanese-San Giuliano Milanese-Melegnano-Cornegliano-Lodi-Mairago-Camairago-Maleo
- Milano San Donato M3-San Donato Milanese-San Giuliano Milanese-Melegnano-Cornegliano-Lodi-Massalengo-San Colombano al Lambro
- Milano San Donato M3-San Donato Milanese-San Giuliano Milanese-Melegnano-Tavazzano-Lodi
- Milano San Donato M3-San Donato Milanese-San Giuliano Milanese-Melegnano-Carpiano-Torrevecchia Pia-Sant'Angelo Lodigiano-Marudo-Graffignana-Valera Fratta

Services by STIE:

- 528 Milano Cimitero Maggiore-M1 Molino Dorino-Rho via Capuana
- 542 Rho Passirana-Rho Fiera Stazione FS/M1-Bollate Carcere
- Milano San Donato M3-San Donato Milanese-Melegnano-Cornegliano-Ossago-Livraga-Brembio-Zorlesco

List of airport bus routes in Milan operated by Locatelli - Orioshuttle
- 1 Milano Centrale-Aeroporto di Bergamo-Orio al Serio
- 2 Milano Centrale-Aeroporto di Bergamo-Orio al Serio

List of interurban bus routes in Milan operated by Nord Est Trasporti
- z301 Milano Lampugnano/Milano Sarca-Sesto San Giovanni FS/M1-Trezzo sull'Adda-Capriate-Dalmine-Bergamo Autostazione
- z302 Cologno Nord M2-Brugherio (clockwise circular)
- z303 Cologno Nord M2-Brugherio (anticlockwise circular)
- z304 Cologno Nord M2-Brugherio (circular)
- z305 Cologno Nord M2-Carugate-Cernusco sul Naviglio (Villa Fiorita M2)
- z307 Cologno Nord M2-Burago-Vimercate
- z309 Cassano d'Adda FS-Vaprio d'Adda-Trezzo sull'Adda
- z310 Gessate M2-Trezzo sull'Adda
- z311 Gessate M2-Vaprio d'Adda
- z312 Gessate M2-Vimercate
- z313 Gessate M2-Paderno d'Adda
- z314 Monza FS-Gessate M2
- z315 Gorgonzola M2-Vimercate
- z317 Vimercate-Correzzana
- z318 Vimercate-Carnate-Usmate
- z319 Vimercate-Ronco Briantino
- z320 Arcore FS-Vimercate
- z321 Monza FS-Vimercate-Mezzago/Trezzo sull'Adda/Porto d'Adda
- z322 Cologno Nord M2-Vimercate-Trezzo sull'Adda/Porto d'Adda
- z323 Cologno Nord M2-Brugherio-Concorezzo-Vimercate

=== Public transport statistics ===
The average amount of time people spend commuting with public transit in Milan on a weekday is 64 min. 14% of public transit riders ride for more than 2 hours every day. The average amount of time people wait at a stop or station for public transit is 11 min, while 12% of riders wait for over 20 minutes on average every day. The average distance people usually ride in a single trip with public transit is 7.7 km, while 14% travel for over 12 km in a single direction.

== National and international rail ==
Milan is one of the most important hubs for the national and international rail network in Italy. Milan Central station is the second station in Italy both for size and passengers after Rome. It is also the main node for high-speed rail lines in northern Italy. Milano Cadorna and Milano Porta Garibaldi stations are respectively the seventh and the eleventh busiest stations in Italy. Because of its position, Milan is also the main gateway for international passenger traffic to Europe. Daily international destinations include Bern, Lugano, Geneva, Zürich, Paris, Nice, Marseille, Vienna, Barcelona and Munich.

Milan is also the core of Lombardy's regional train network. Regional trains were operated on two different systems by LeNord (departing from Milano Cadorna) and Trenitalia (departing from Milan Centrale and Milano Porta Garibaldi). Beginning in 2011, a new company, Trenord, operates both Trenitalia and LeNord regional trains in Lombardy.

== Roads ==
Milan is a key node for the Italian road network, being the junction between the east-west A4 highway to Turin and Venice and the north-south A1 highway to Rome and Naples. Other important highways, such as the A7 to Genova and the A8-A9 to Switzerland, also serve the city. Highways reaching Milan are linked together by a ring road formed by the 3 tangenziali (the A50, A51 and A52) and part of the A4 highway, with a total length of over 100 km around the city.

Milan road system is characterized by a high rate of traffic congestion, due to a high level of cars per capita and a high number of commuters in the metropolitan area. Congested traffic is also responsible for the high pollution rate in the Milan area. Counter measures included the partial ban of private cars inside the Milan urban area for some period, usually during Sundays. In 2008, a traffic pollution charge for vehicles entering the city, Ecopass, was introduced. The program resulted in a lower proportion of highly polluting vehicles on the roads in the city. However, the program progressively lost effectiveness as the city's vehicle fleet got greener. Since 16 January 2012 a new program, Area C, was introduced as a congestion charge (as opposed to the previous pollution charge), thus targeting any private vehicle entering Milan city center. Although high by European standards, Milan is one of the big cities with the lowest number of motor vehicles per capita in Italy, with 543 per 1000 people in 2011, reduced to around 495 per 1000 as of 2021.

=== Taxis ===
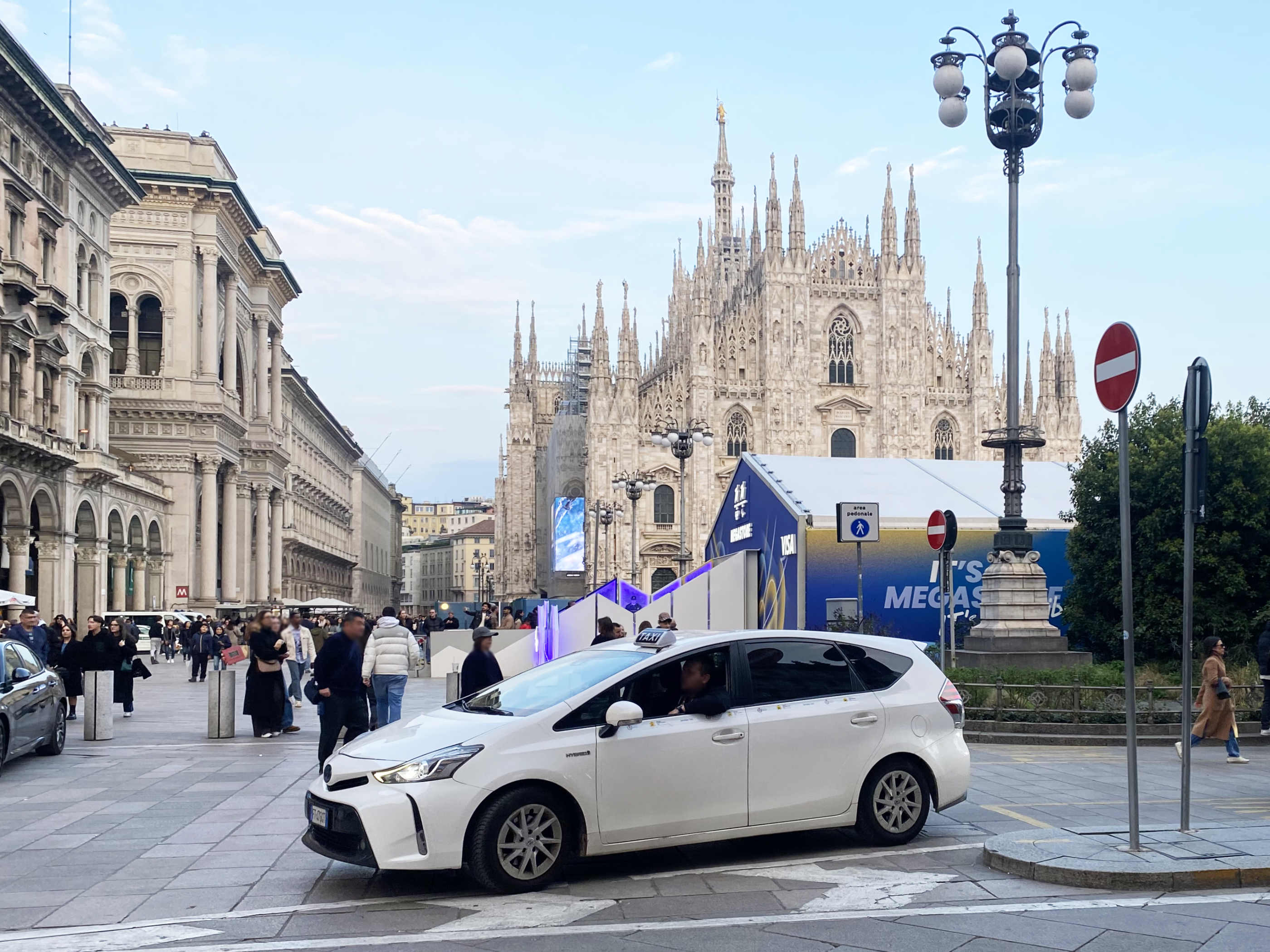
A licensed white taxi near Milan Cathedral

Milan's taxi service is operated by several radio taxi cooperatives. Licensed taxis are white by municipal regulation and can be found at designated ranks throughout the city or booked via the unified taxi number 02 7777. Fixed fares apply for routes between the city centre and the airports.

=== Car sharing ===
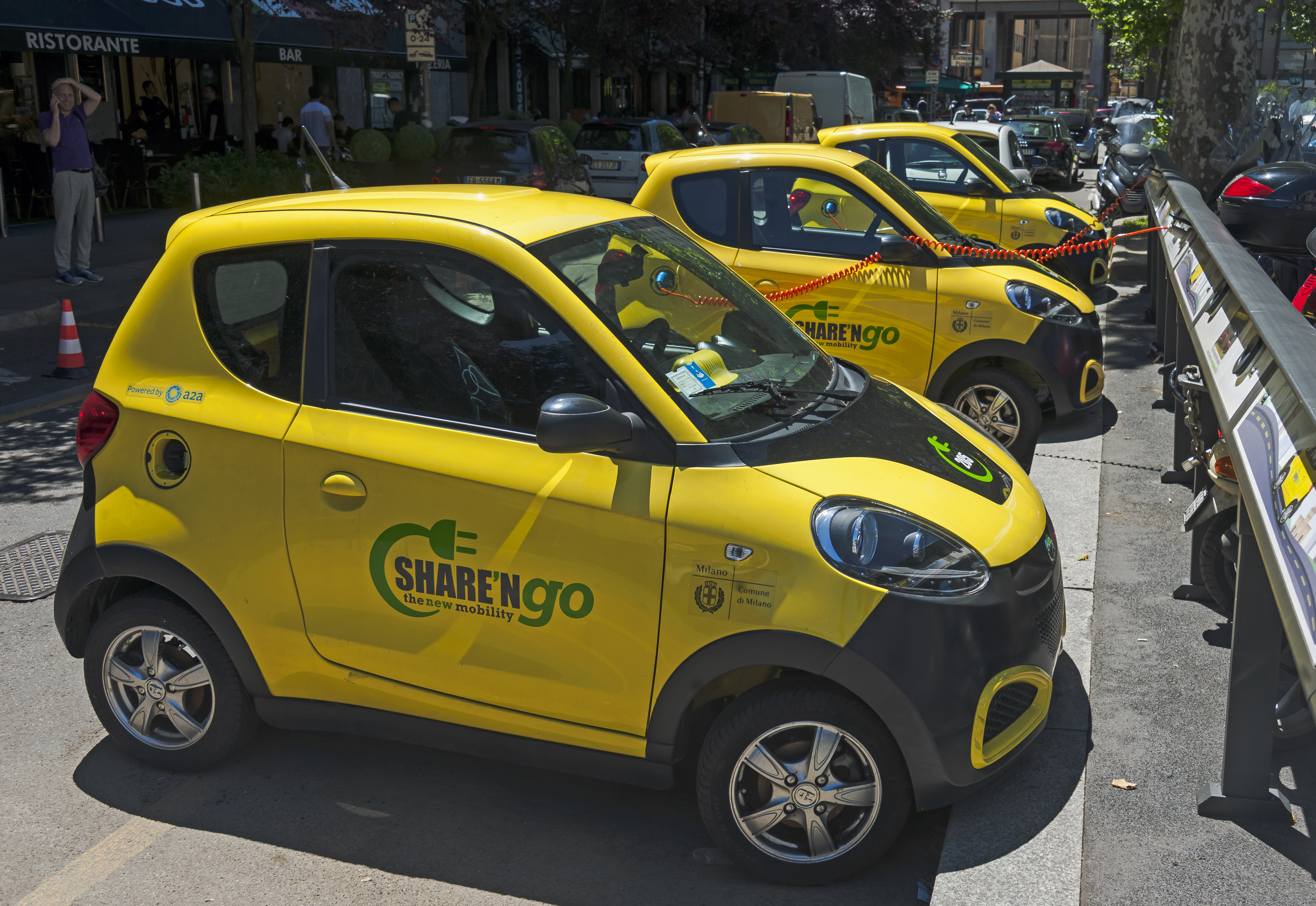
Sharen'go cars at Piazza Duca d'Aosta

Several car-sharing systems are active in the city. GuidaMi, the first scheme, is managed by ATM and comprises 132 vehicles and about 5,500 registered users. Car2go was activated in August 2013 and has a fleet of 700 cars and more than 50,000 registered users. Other services include E-vai from Trenord, DriveNow from BMW, Twist and Enjoy from Eni. In 2015 the Chinese automaker ZD introduced its Sharen'go electric car-sharing service to Milan, making it the first city outside the company's native China where the service was available.

Car sharing in Milan serves about 0.5% of the total mobility of the city, and with 323,000 users, as of June 2016 it is the Italian city with the largest number of car sharing customers.

=== Cycling ===
The city's mostly flat topography favors cycling. The cycle routes network is still limited, but is being constantly expanded. Milan was also one of the first Italian cities to activate a bike sharing system.

== Airports ==
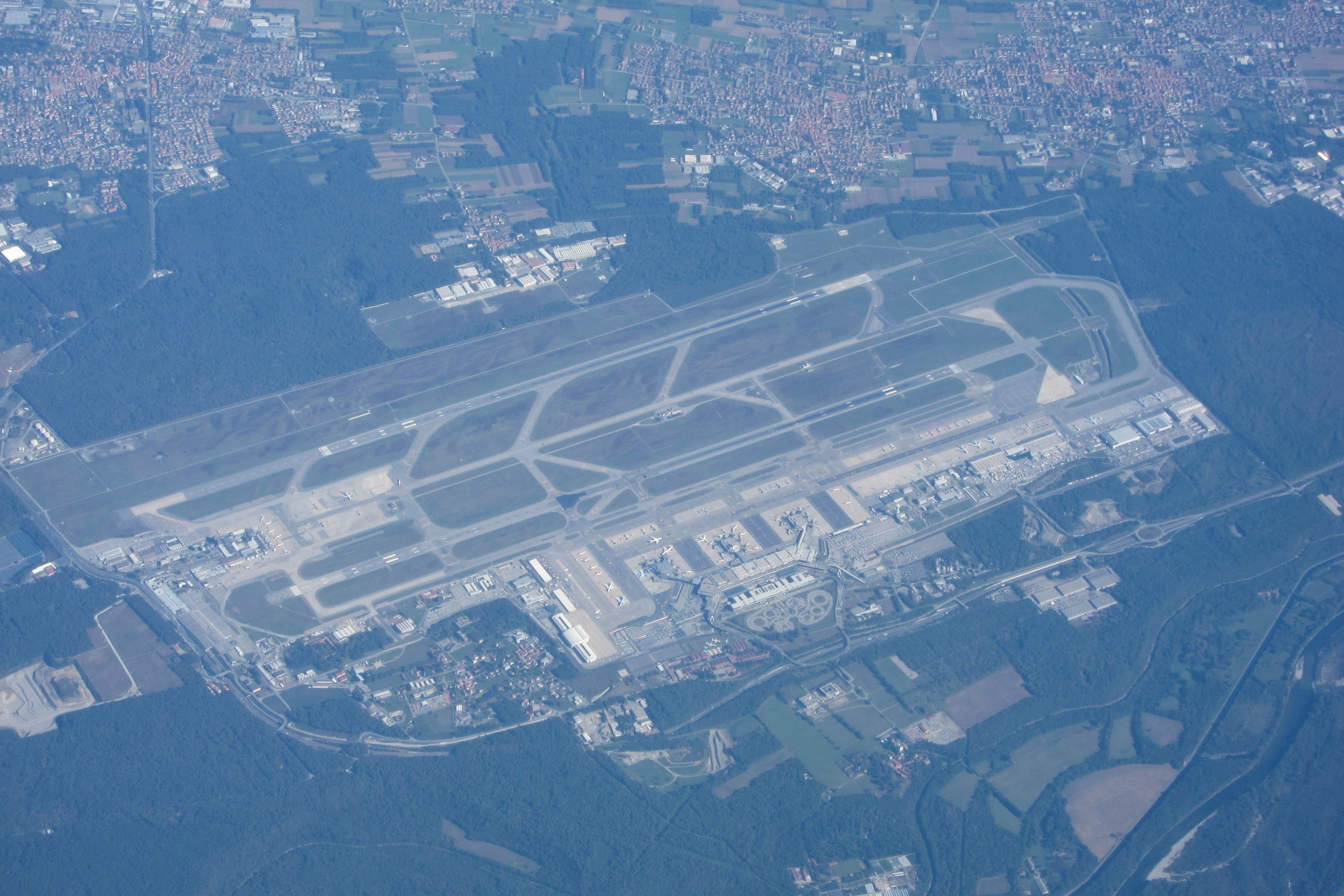
Malpensa Airport aerial view

Milan's airport system is the busiest in Italy, surpassing that of Rome. The city is served by three major airports: Malpensa Airport, the biggest in northern Italy; Linate Airport, located near the city centre and mainly used for domestic traffic; and Bergamo Airport, located in the neighbouring city of Bergamo, used mainly by low-cost airlines. Combined, these three airports transported a total of 56.9 million passengers in 2024. Milano Bresso, operated by Aero Club Milano, is a minor general aviation airport.

The three major airports are connected by bus to the city center. In addition, Malpensa has a direct rail connection to central railway stations in Milan (notably Centrale, Garibaldi and Cadorna) via the Malpensa Express service. Thanks to Metro line 4, Linate airport also gained a fixed rail connection to Milan city center and will reach the city's south-western districts once the line is finished. Bergamo airport will instead be connected to the nearby city of Bergamo via a railway line that is projected to be finished by 2026; from Bergamo main station, trains will be able to reach the stations of Milano Centrale in less than an hour and Milano Porta Garibaldi.

== See also ==
- Azienda Trasporti Milanesi
- Integrated ticketing in Lombardy
- Milan Metro
- Milan Passerby Railway
- Milan Suburban Railway Network
- Airports of Milan
- List of rapid transit systems
- List of suburban and commuter rail systems

== Bibliography ==
- Francesco Ogliari, Storia dei Trasporti Lombardi, vol.1 - Dall'Omnibus alla Metropolitana, Milano, Cavallotti Editori, 1976.
