= Milano Porta Vittoria railway station =

Railway station in Milan, Italy

Milano Porta Vittoria
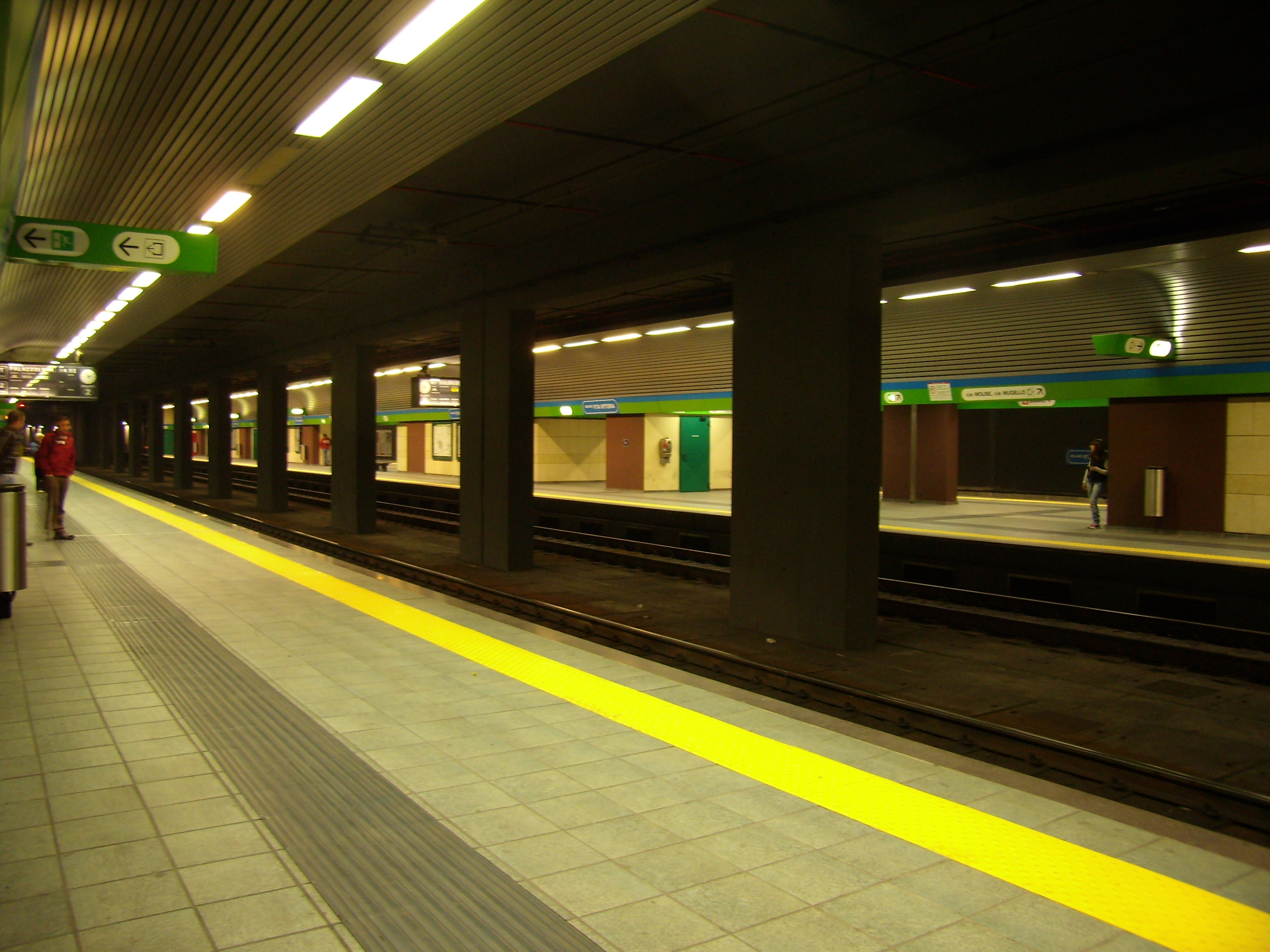

General information
- Location: Viale Molise 71, Milan; Italy
- Coordinates: 45°27′38″N 09°13′26″E
- Owner: Rete Ferroviaria Italiana
- Operator: Trenord
- Line: Passante
- Distance: 3.204 km (1.991 mi) from Bivio Lambro; 3.204 km (1.991 mi) from Milano Rogoredo
- Platforms: 2
- Tracks: 4

Construction
- Structure type: Underground

Other information
- Fare zone: STIBM: Mi1

History
- Opened: 12 December 2004

Services
Preceding station	Trenord	Following station
Milano Dateo towards Saronno	Line S1 (Milan suburban railway service)	Milano Rogoredo towards Lodi
Milano Dateo towards Mariano Comense	Line S2 (Milan suburban railway service)	Milano Rogoredo Terminus
Milano Dateo towards Varese	Line S5 (Milan suburban railway service)	Milano Forlanini towards Treviglio
Milano Dateo towards Novara	Line S6 (Milan suburban railway service)	Milano Forlanini towards Treviglio
Milano Dateo towards Cormano–Cusano Milanino	Line S12 (Milan suburban railway service)	Milano Rogoredo towards Melegnano
Milano Dateo towards Milano Bovisa	Line S13 (Milan suburban railway service)	Milano Rogoredo towards Pavia
Location
- Location within Milan Location within Lombardy Location within Northern Italy Location within Italy

Milano Porta Vittoria is an underground railway station in Milan, Italy. It opened in 2004 as part of the Milan Passante railway, as its south-eastern gate. The station is located on Viale Molise.

== Services ==
Milano Porta Vittoria is served by lines S1, S2, S5, S6, S12 and S13 of the Milan suburban railway service, operated by the Lombard railway company Trenord.

== See also ==
- Railway stations in Milan
- Milan suburban railway service
- Milan Passante railway
