= Milano Dateo railway station =

Railway station in Milan, Italy

Milano Dateo
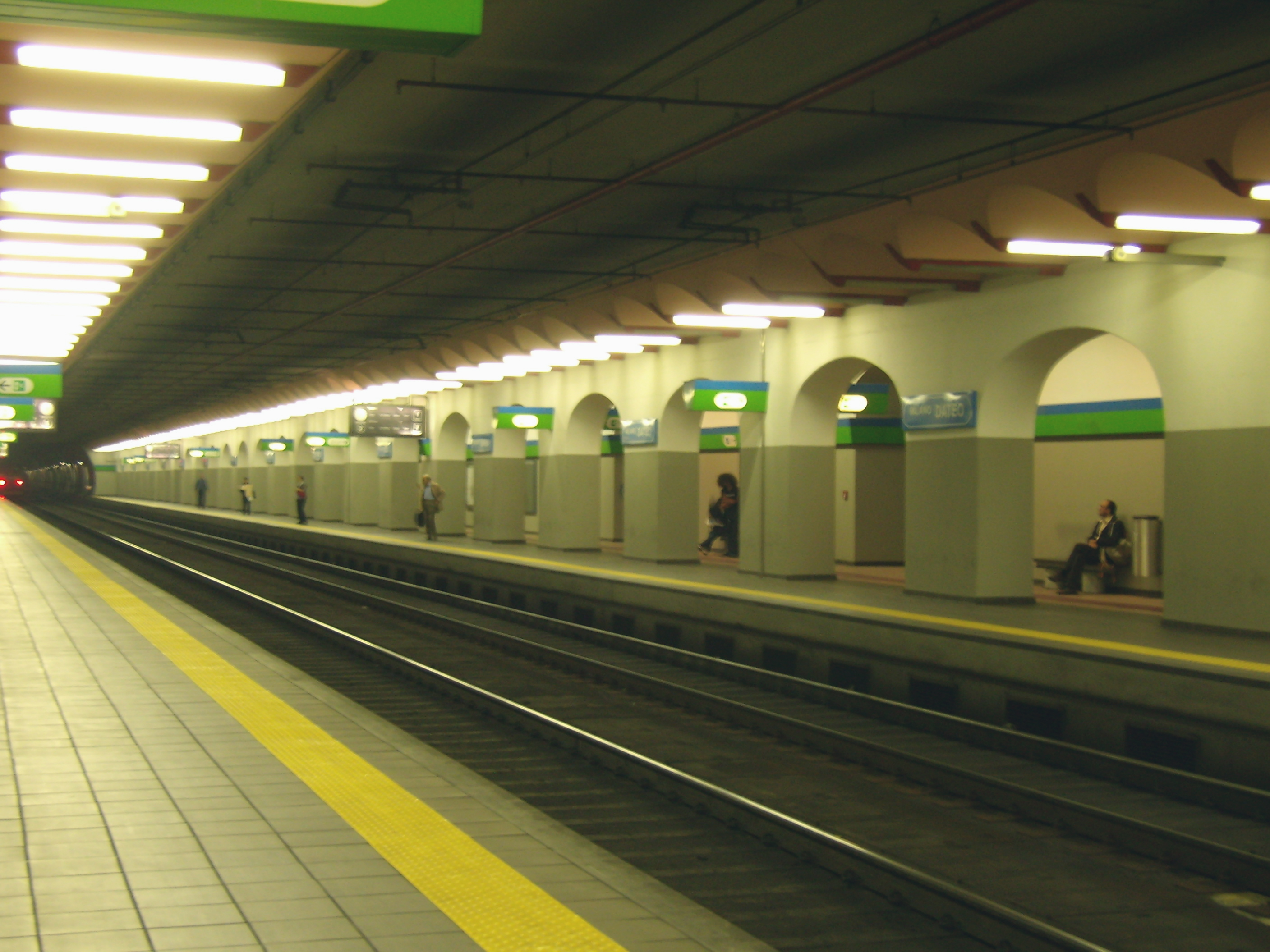

General information
- Location: Piazzale Dateo, Milan; Italy
- Coordinates: 45°28′04″N 09°13′03″E
- Owner: Rete Ferroviaria Italiana
- Operator: Trenord
- Line: Passante
- Distance: 5.063 km (3.146 mi) from Bivio Lambro
- Platforms: 2
- Tracks: 2

Construction
- Structure type: Underground

Other information
- Fare zone: STIBM: Mi1

History
- Opened: 30 June 2002

Services
Preceding station	Trenord	Following station
Milano Porta Venezia towards Saronno	Line S1 (Milan suburban railway service)	Milano Porta Vittoria towards Lodi
Milano Porta Venezia towards Mariano Comense	Line S2 (Milan suburban railway service)	Milano Porta Vittoria towards Milano Rogoredo
Milano Porta Venezia towards Varese	Line S5 (Milan suburban railway service)	Milano Porta Vittoria towards Treviglio
Milano Porta Venezia towards Novara	Line S6 (Milan suburban railway service)	Milano Porta Vittoria towards Treviglio
Milano Porta Venezia towards Cormano–Cusano Milanino	Line S12 (Milan suburban railway service)	Milano Porta Vittoria towards Melegnano
Milano Porta Venezia towards Milano Bovisa	Line S13 (Milan suburban railway service)	Milano Porta Vittoria towards Pavia
Location
- Location within Milan Location within Lombardy Location within Northern Italy Location within Italy

Milano Dateo is an underground railway station in Milan, Italy. It opened in 2002 as part of the Milan Passante railway. It is located under Piazzale Dateo.

== Services ==
Milano Dateo is served by lines S1, S2, S5, S6, S12 and S13 of the Milan suburban railway network, operated by the Lombard railway company Trenord. It is connected to the M4 metro station of the same name since November 26, 2022, providing a direct link to Linate Airport.

== See also ==
- Railway stations in Milan
- Milan suburban railway network
- Milan Passante railway
- Milan Metro Line 4
