= Milano Porta Garibaldi railway station =

Railway station in Milan, Italy

Milano Porta Garibaldi
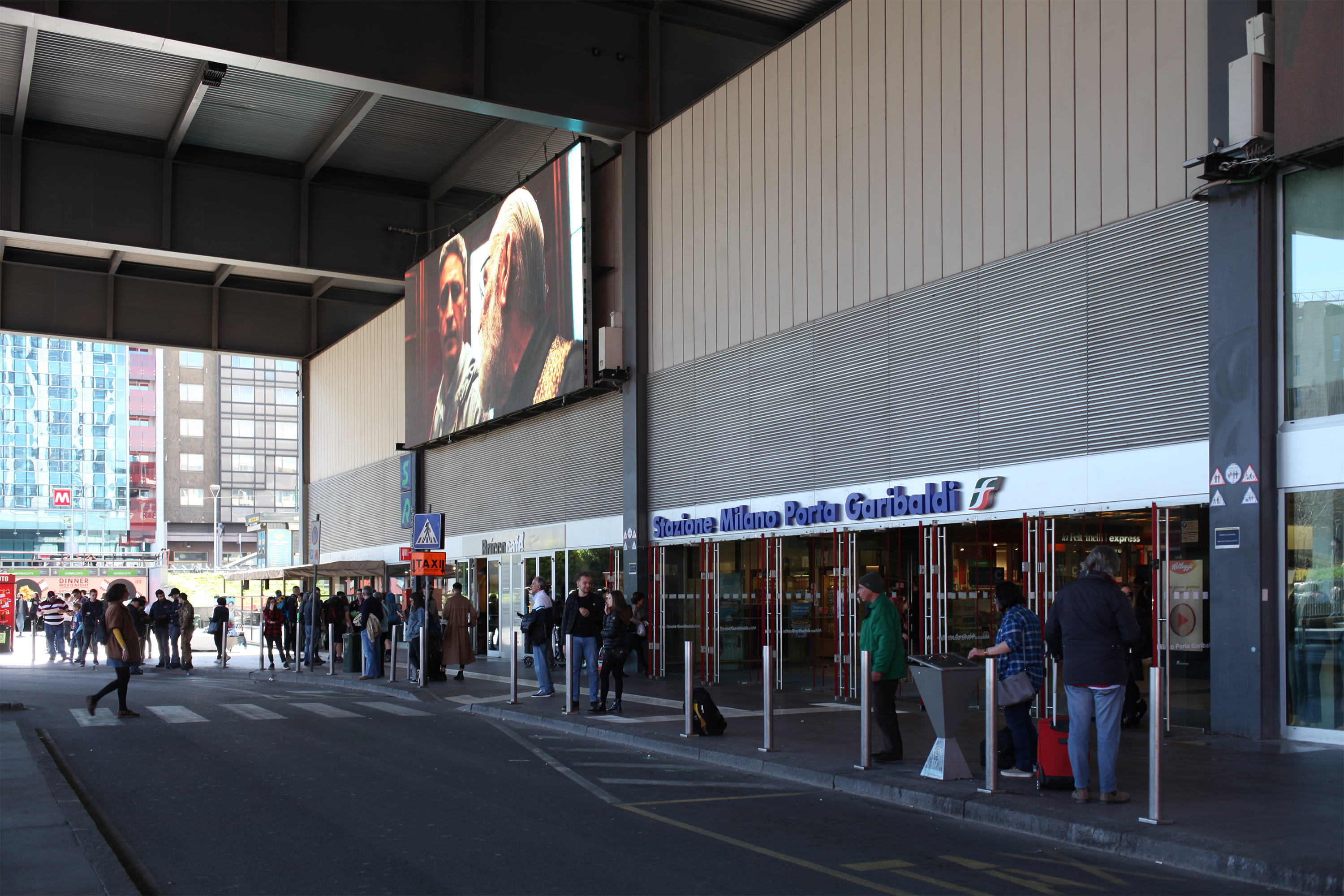
- Main entrance

General information
- Location: Piazza Sigmund Freud, 1, Milan; Italy
- Coordinates: 45°29′05″N 09°11′15″E
- Elevation: 130 m
- Owner: Rete Ferroviaria Italiana
- Operator: Trenord; Trenitalia; SNCF
- Lines: Milan–Turin; Milan–Domodossola; Milan–Chiasso; Passante
- Distance: 8.410 km (5.226 mi) from Bivio Lambro
- Tracks: 22
- Train operators: Centostazioni
- Connections: Garibaldi MM

Construction
- Platform levels: Surface and underground

Other information
- IATA code: IPR
- Fare zone: STIBM: Mi1

History
- Opened: 5 November 1961
- Rebuilt: 21 December 1997 (underground section)
Services
Preceding station	SNCF	Following station
Torino Porta Susa towards Paris-Lyon	TGV	Terminus
Preceding station	Trenord	Following station
Milano Lancetti towards Saronno	Line S1 (Milan suburban railway service)	Milano Repubblica towards Lodi
Milano Lancetti towards Mariano Comense	Line S2 (Milan suburban railway service)	Milano Repubblica towards Milano Rogoredo
Milano Lancetti towards Varese	Line S5 (Milan suburban railway service)	Milano Repubblica towards Treviglio
Milano Lancetti towards Novara	Line S6 (Milan suburban railway service)	Milano Repubblica towards Treviglio
Terminus	Line S7 (Milan suburban railway service)	Milano Greco Pirelli towards Lecco
Terminus	Line S8 (Milan suburban railway service)	Milano Greco Pirelli towards Lecco
Milano Villapizzone towards Rho	Line S11 (Milan suburban railway service)	Milano Greco Pirelli towards Chiasso
Milano Lancetti towards Cormano–Cusano Milanino	Line S12 (Milan suburban railway service)	Milano Repubblica towards Melegnano
Milano Lancetti towards Milano Bovisa	Line S13 (Milan suburban railway service)	Milano Repubblica towards Pavia
Location
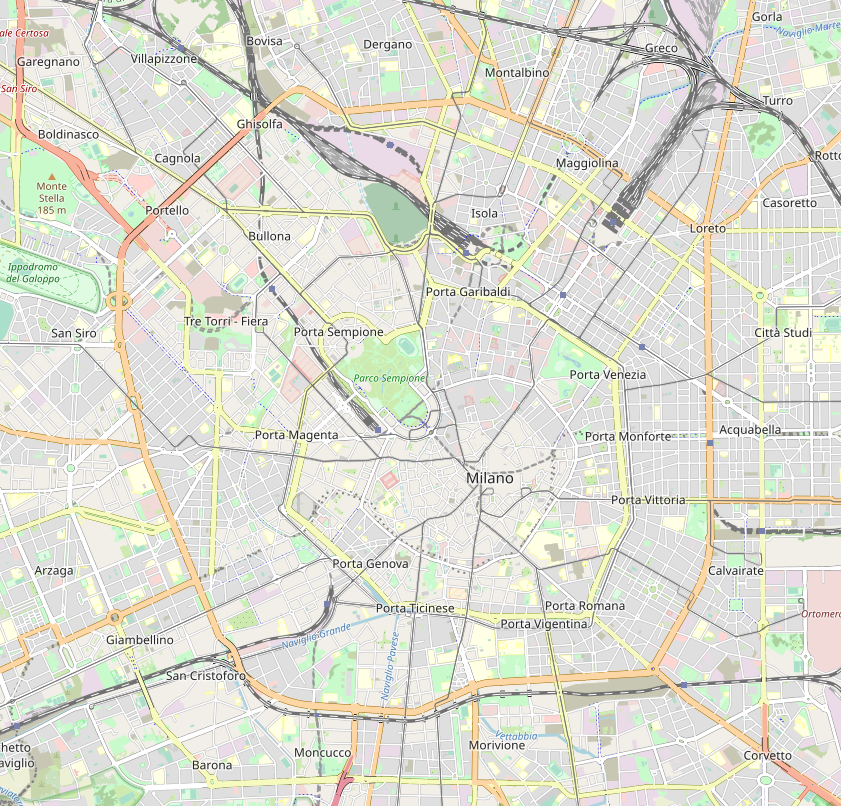
- Location within Milan Location within Lombardy Location within Northern Italy Location within Italy

Milano Porta Garibaldi (IATA: IPR) is a major railway station in the Italian city of Milan, located just to the north of the neighbourhood known as Porta Garibaldi. Porta Garibaldi is the city's main station for commuter traffic with 25 million passengers annually, although it is second to Centrale station considering total passenger traffic. The station is located on Piazza Sigmund Freud.

== History ==
Garibaldi station was built in 1961 near three former stations called Porta Nuova, opened between 1840 (Milan's first station on the Milan–Monza railway) and 1931. The earlier station was named Varesine (after Varese) and was the terminus of lines to Gallarate, Novara and Varese. The construction of the new station was part of an ambitious project for the development of a business centre, which remained largely uncompleted until the 2010s Porta Nuova redevelopment project. In 1966 it was connected via the Garibaldi Tunnel to Mirabello junction and connected to the line to Monza (at Greco Pirelli station) and the belt line (at Lambrate station). The station thus became accessible from all the regional lines of Ferrovie dello Stato (FS).

== Train services ==
Porta Garibaldi has 12 terminal platforms looking north-west and 8 through platforms going from north-west to the aforementioned Garibaldi Tunnel, thus connecting the station to Milano Lambrate, Milano Greco Pirelli, and Milano Centrale as well, thanks to the passantino (Italian for "small passageway") link. This link has been used by Frecciarossa high-speed trains since 13 September 2010, with additional services introduced starting in December 2010. In addition, two underground platforms are served by trains on the Milan Passante railway.

On 20 March 2006, FS's subsidiary Centostazioni began a redevelopment of the passenger facilities under contract with Pool Engineering, introducing new furniture, lighting, and retail spaces. The station is topped by two skyscrapers, the Garibaldi Towers, which previously housed the regional offices of Trenitalia and FS. After a complete restyling, they now house the offices of Maire Tecnimont.

The upper part of the station has been the terminus of the suburban lines S7 and S8 since 2009. Long-distance high-speed trains between Turin and Rome (formerly branded as Eurostar Italia) are operated by Trenitalia. Trenord operates a daily Eurocity connection to Munich in association with Deutsche Bahn and Österreichische Bundesbahnen. Three SNCF TGV services from Paris began terminating here in November 2011, replacing Milano Centrale.

The station is served by the following services (incomplete):

- High speed services (TGV) Paris - Chambéry - Turin - Milan
- High speed services (Frecciarossa) Turin - Milan - Bologna - Florence - Rome - Naples - Salerno
- Regional services (Treno regionale) Milan - Monza - Carnate - Bergamo
- Milan Metropolitan services (S1) Saronno - Milan - Lodi
- Milan Metropolitan services (S2) Mariano Comense - Seveso - Milan
- Milan Metropolitan services (S5) Varese - Rho - Milan - Treviglio
- Milan Metropolitan services (S6) Novara - Rho - Milan - Treviglio
- Milan Metropolitan services (S7) Milan - Monza - Molteno - Lecco
- Milan Metropolitan services (S8) Milan - Monza - Carnate - Lecco
- Milan Metropolitan services (S11) Rho - Milan - Monza - Seregno - Como - Chiasso
- Milan Metropolitan services (S12) Milan - Melegnano
- Milan Metropolitan services (S13) Milan - Pavia

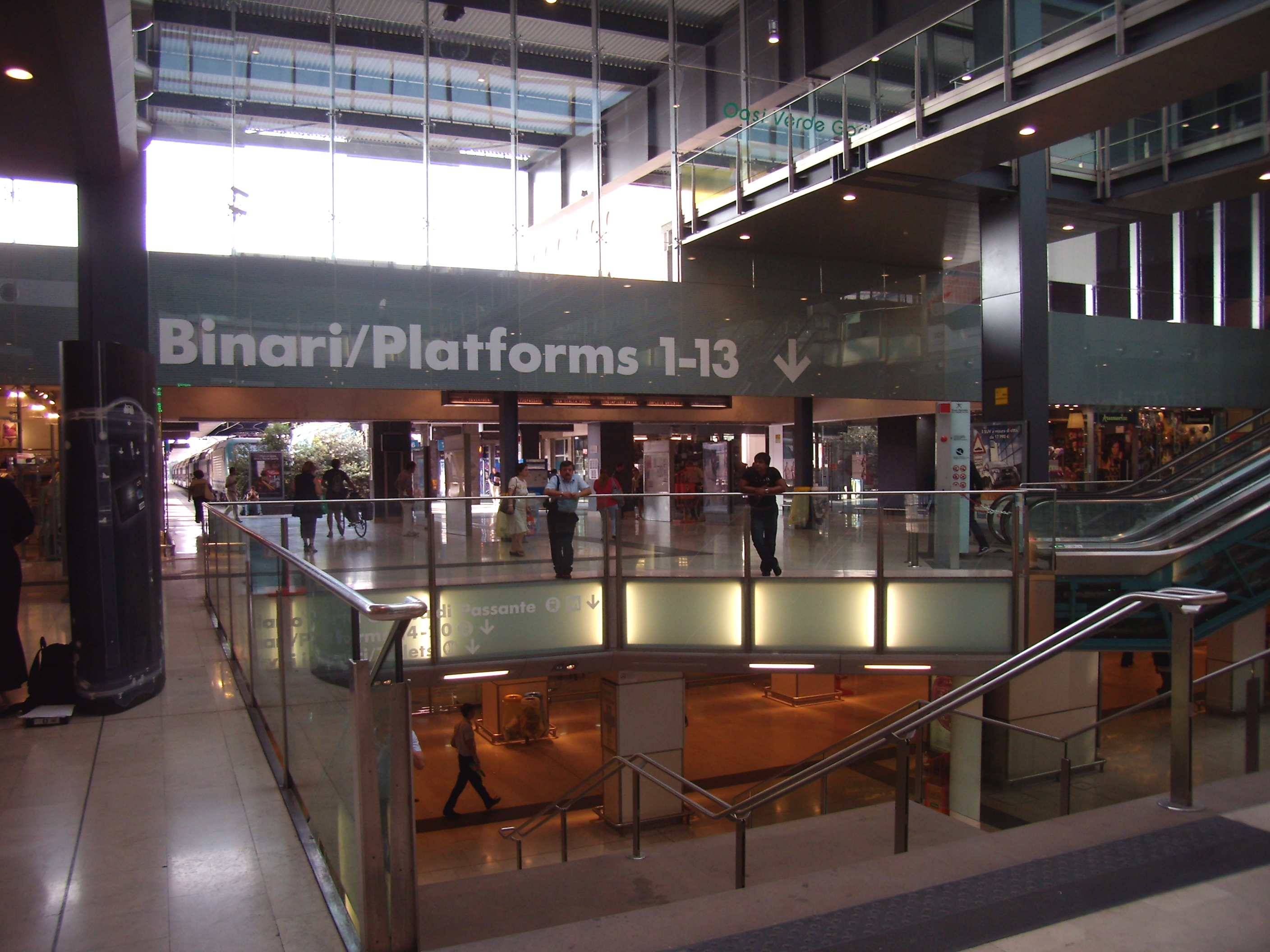
Interiors

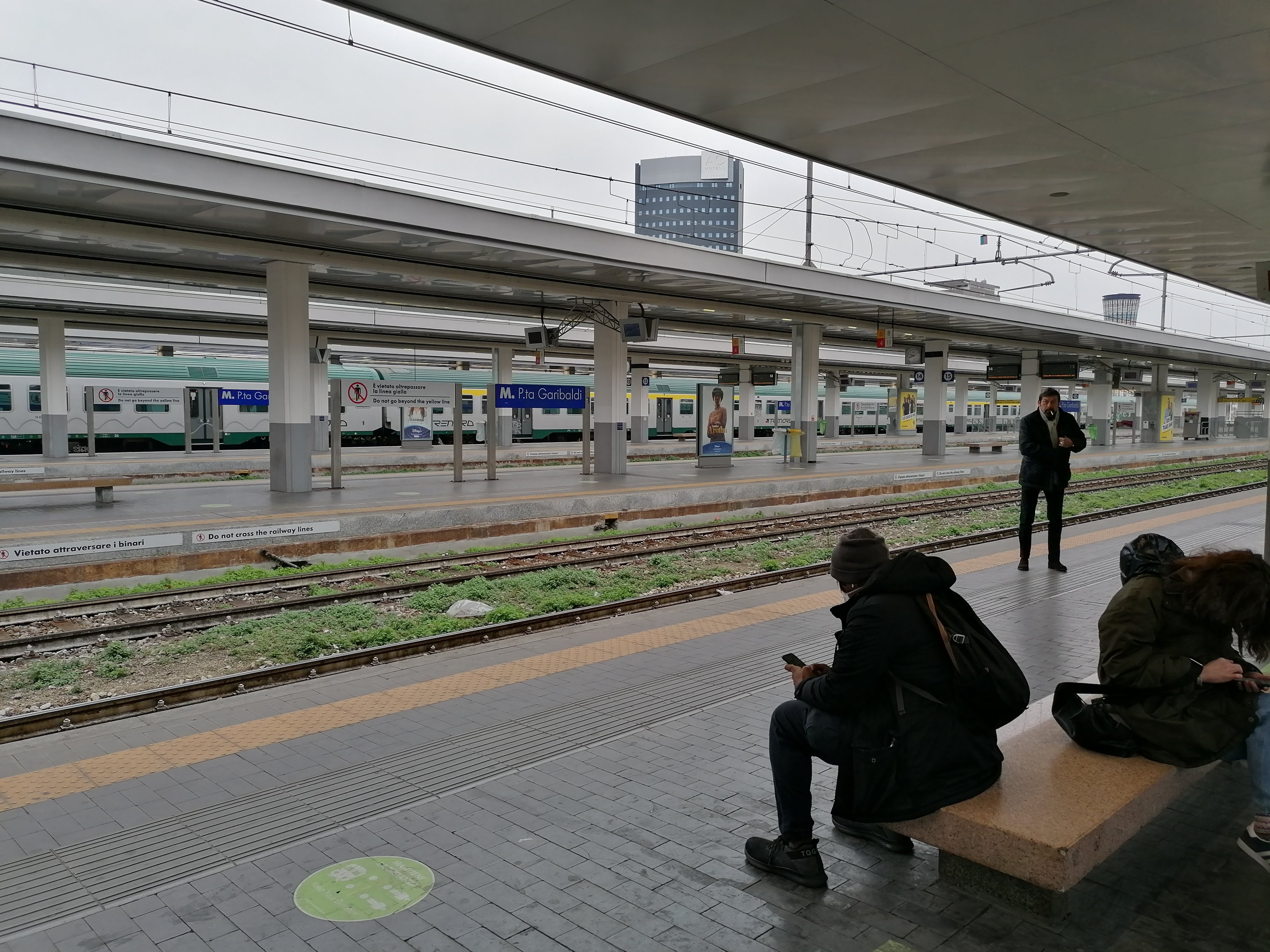
Platforms (surface)

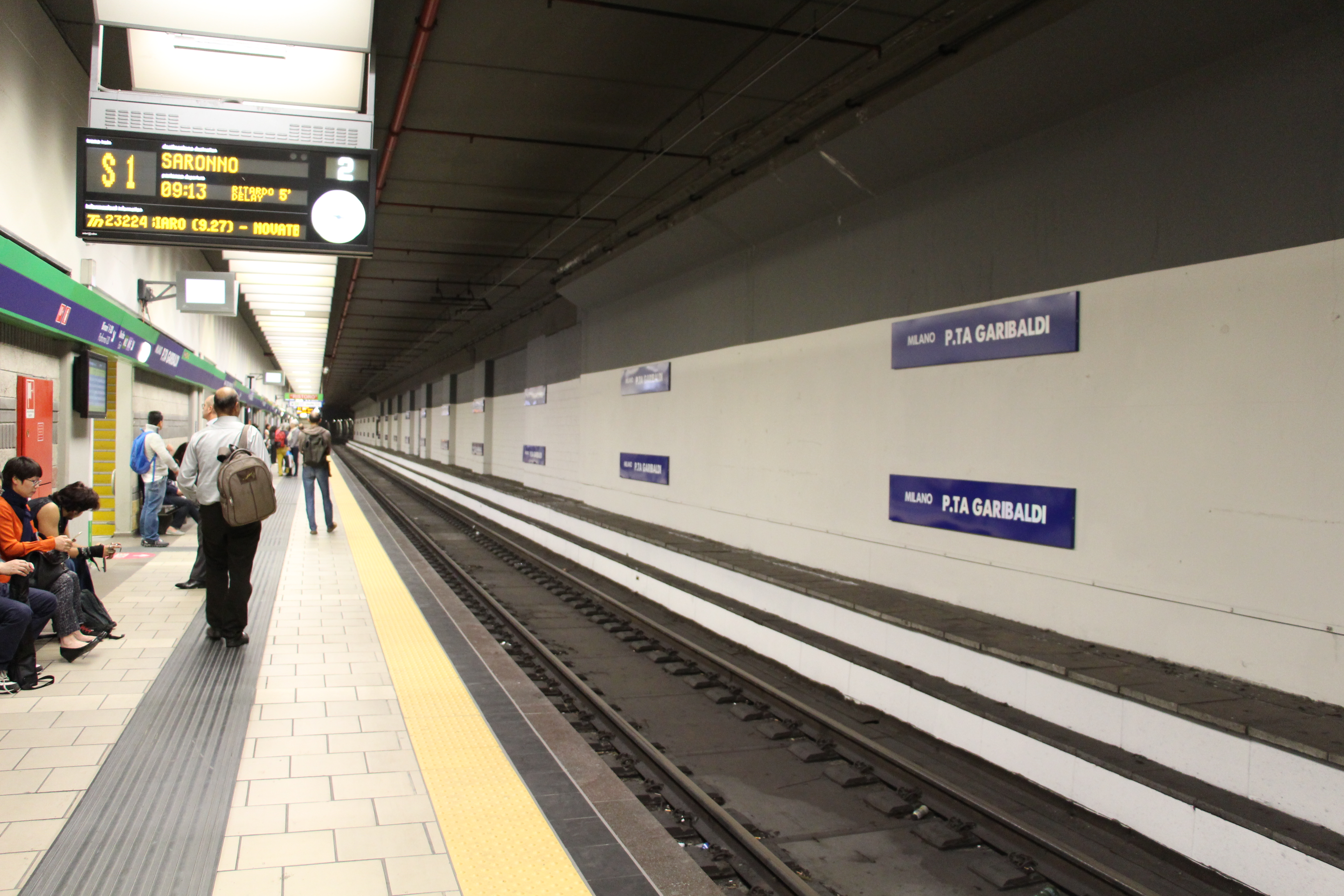
Platforms (underground)

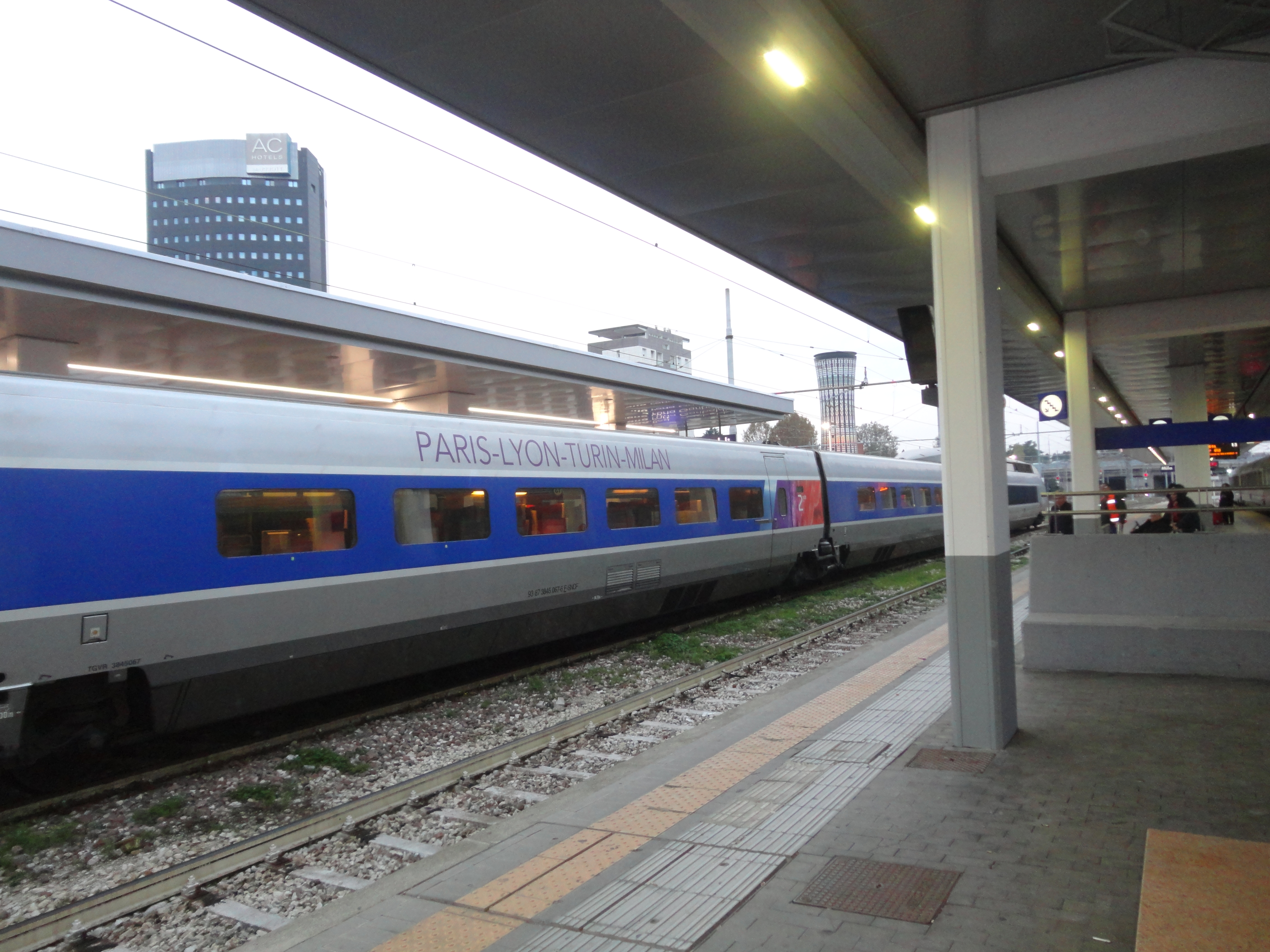
TGV Milan P.ta Garibaldi - Paris Gare de Lyon

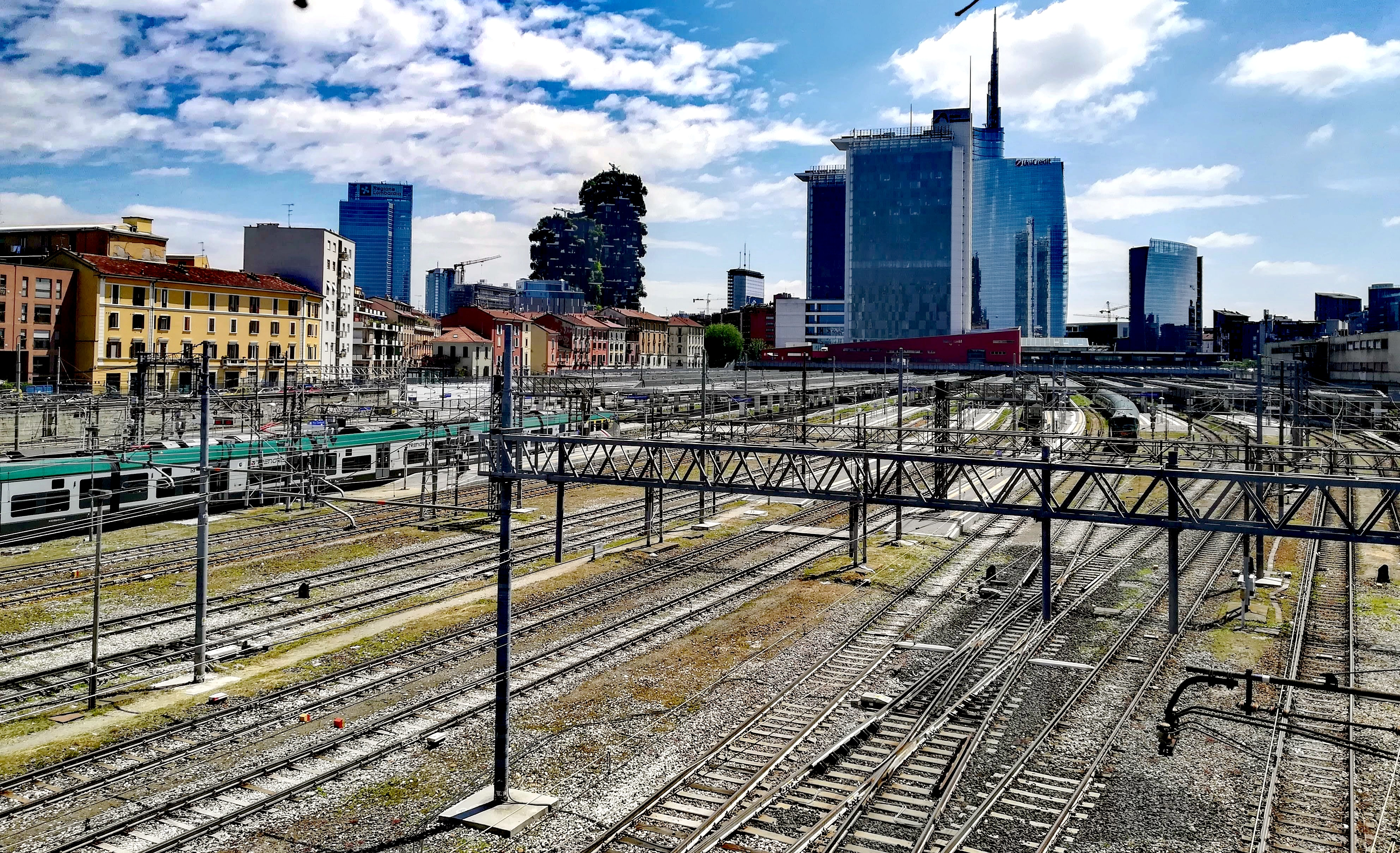
Skyline
