= Angelo Mangiarotti =

Italian architect and industrial designer (1921–2012)

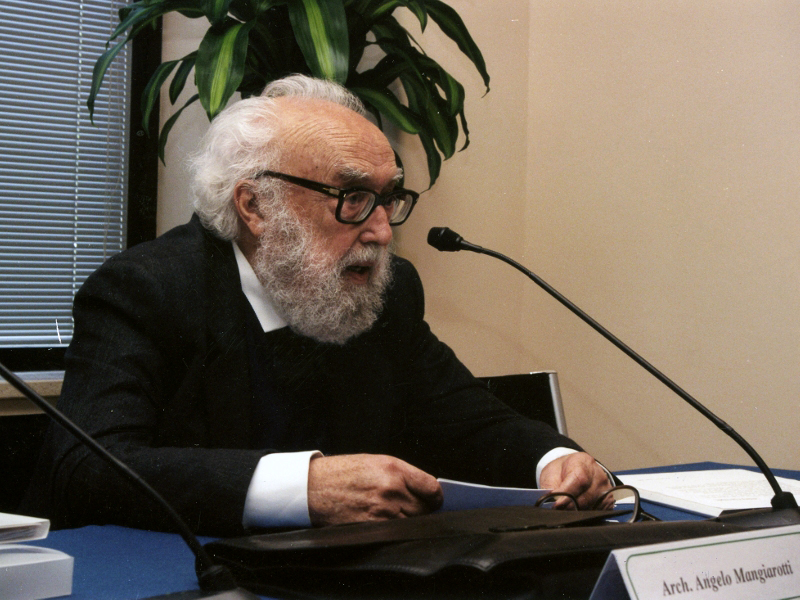
- Mangiarotti in 2007
- Born: February 26, 1921; Milan, Italy
- Died: July 2, 2012 (aged 90–91); Milan, Italy
- Occupation: Architect

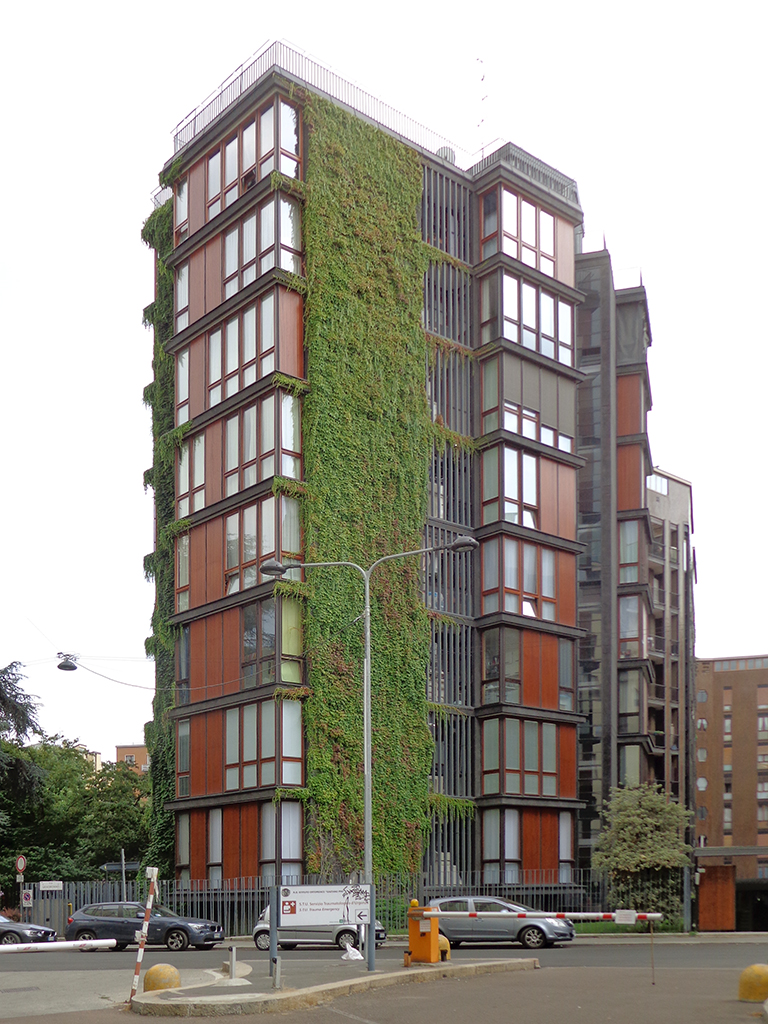
The Bosco Verticale in the Quadronno district of Milan

Angelo Mangiarotti (26 February 1921 – 2 July 2012) was an Italian architect and industrial designer. His designs were mostly for industrial buildings and railway stations. In 1994, he received the Compasso d'Oro award of the Associazione per il Disegno Industriale for his lifetime of achievement.

== Life and work ==
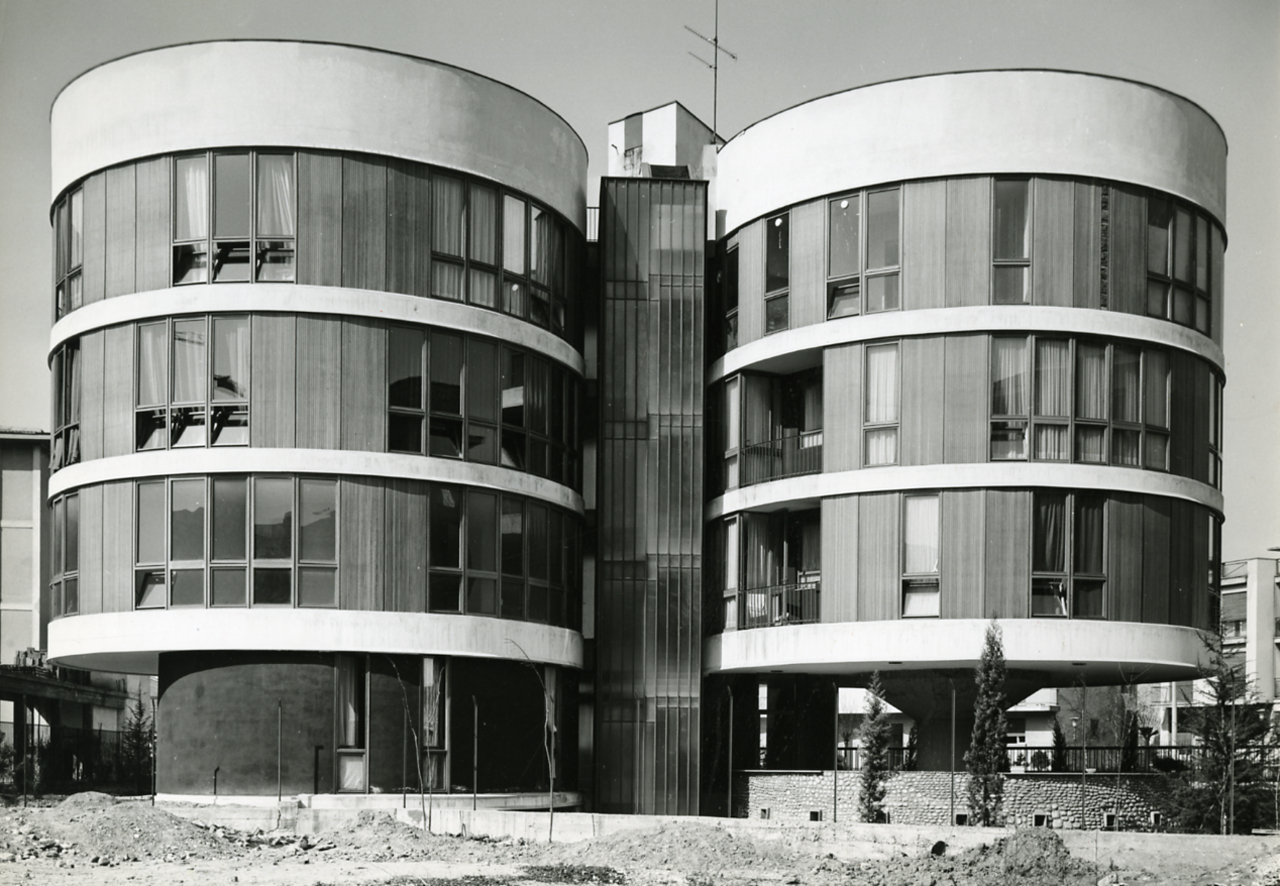
The "3 cylinders house", Milan, photographed by Paolo Monti in 1970

Mangiarotti was born in 1921, in Milan. He studied architecture at the Politecnico di Milano, graduating in 1948.

In 1953, he was a visiting professor at the Design Institute of the Illinois Institute of Technology. While in Chicago he came into contact with Frank Lloyd Wright, Walter Gropius, Ludwig Mies van der Rohe and Konrad Wachsmann.

From 1955 to 1960, he had an architectural and design studio in Milan in partnership with Bruno Morassutti, and in 1965 was among the founding members of the Associazione per il Disegno Industriale. He held a number of teaching positions, many of them outside Italy. In 1989 he established an architectural practice in Tokyo.

In 1994, he received the Compasso d'Oro award of the Associazione per il Disegno Industriale for his lifetime of achievement.

He died on 2 July 2012, aged 90 or 91, in Milan.

== Work ==
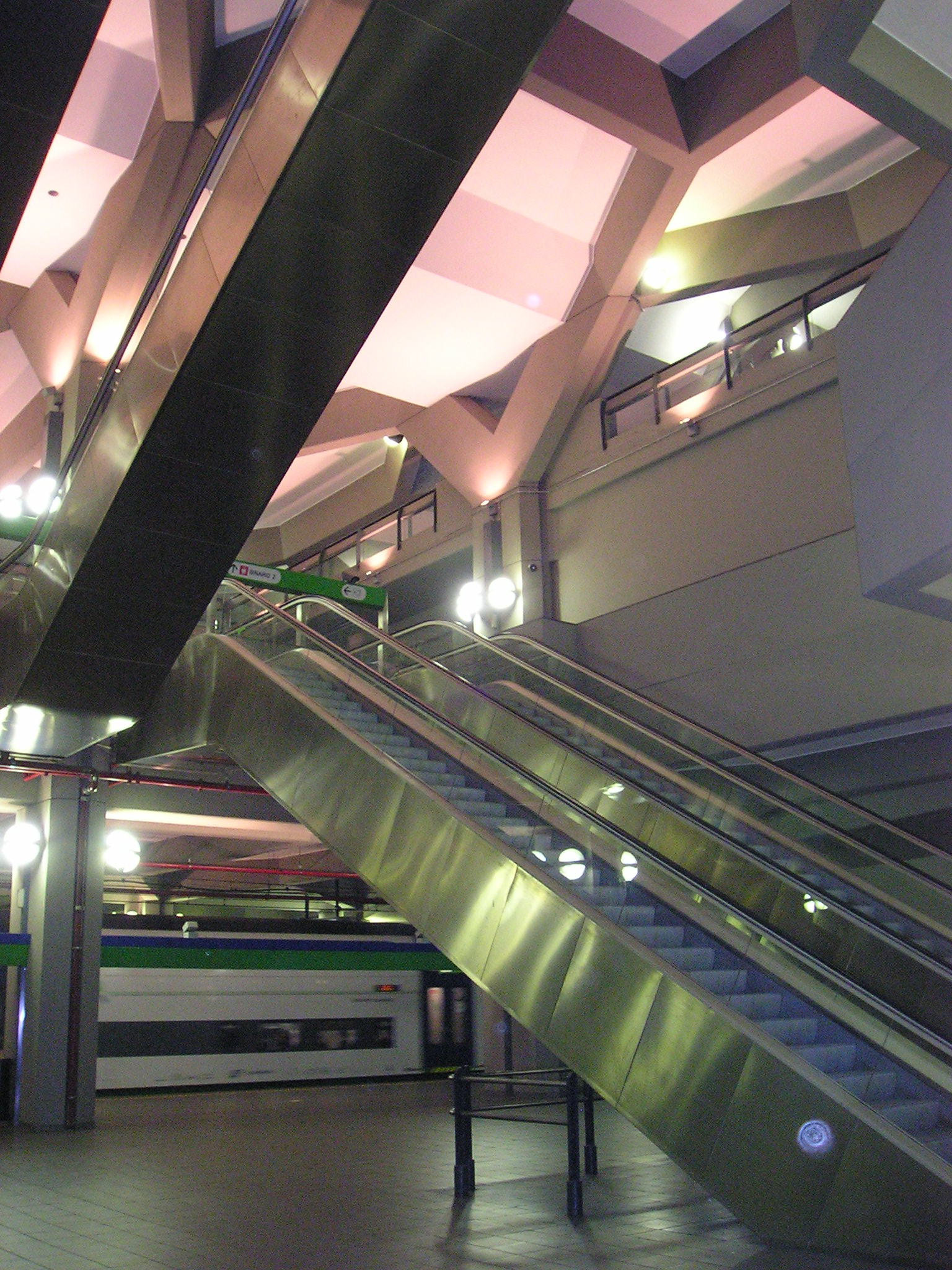
Repubblica station

His architectural work included many industrial buildings, among them projects in Padua in 1959, in Marcianise and in Mestre in 1962, in Monza in 1964, and in Cinisello Balsamo in 1973. He also designed a number of railway stations, among them the Milano Certosa and Milano Rogoredo for the Ferrovie dello Stato between 1982 and 1988, and the Porta Venezia and Repubblica stations on the Passante Ferroviario di Milano between 1983 and 1996. Among his other projects were the offices and exhibition space for Snaidero in Majano in Friuli-Venezia Giulia in 1978, and the exhibition centre for the Internazionale Marmi e Macchine – the organisation behind the Fiera Internazionale Marmi e Macchine di Carrara trade fair – in 1992 and 1993.

Among Mangiarotti’s most prominent industrial design objects are the Lesbo and Saffo Murano lamps for Artemide in 1966, as well as the Giogali chandeliers for Vistosi in 1967. Further acclaimed designs are his Carrara marble and stone tables relying on gravity joints: Eros, 1971; Incas, 1978; Asolo, 1981. Mangiarotti’s 1980 silver vases and decanters are part of MoMA’s collection.

== Books ==
His book In nome dell'architettura was published by Jaca Book in Milan in 1987.
