= Passante Ferroviario di Milano =

Underground railway in Milan, Italy

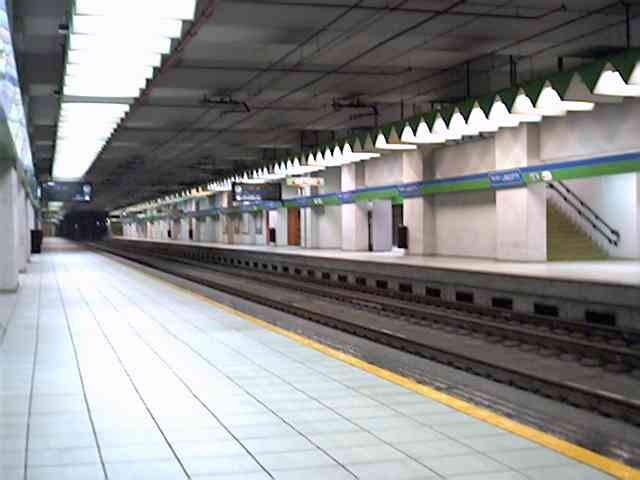
- Milano Lancetti station

Overview
- Native name: Passante ferroviario di Milano
- Status: operational
- Owner: RFI
- Locale: Milan, Italy
- Stations: 6

Service
- Type: commuter rail
- Services: S1, S2, S5, S6, S12, S13
- Operator: Trenord
- Daily ridership: 174,000

History
- Opened: 1997

Technical
- Line length: 13 km (8.1 mi)
- Number of tracks: 2
- Track gauge: 1,435 mm (4 ft 8 1/2 in)
- Electrification: 3 kV DC, overhead line
- Operating speed: 60 km/h (37 mph)
Route map

The Passante Ferroviario di Milano is an underground railway which runs through Milan, Italy.

The first part was opened in 1997 and was completed in 2008. Its main feature is to be open in its extremities, and to be directly interconnected with the railway system of Lombardy. It is only used by suburban trains operated by Trenord.

The passante is connected with subway lines at Porta Garibaldi station (Line 2 and Line 5), Repubblica station (Line 3), Rogoredo (Line 3), Porta Venezia (Line 1), and Dateo (Line 4).

The railway runs on the same line of the historic Milanese northern railway, which was removed in 1931 when the Milanese railway system was redesigned along with the opening of the grand new Central Station.

"Passante" is the Italian word for "passing" and is used to describe a railway built through a major city, connecting suburban lines. This is modelled on S-Bahn underground junctions built in West Germany in the 1970s.

== History ==
The idea of a suburban railway network for the city of Milan can be traced back to the 1960s, when the increasing population of the city and the surrounding boroughs made clear the need for a faster and more efficient way to complete medium to longer distance journeys. Designs for an underground railway passing through the city centre were completed at the end of the 1970s, and construction began in 1982, with the work expected to be completed in less than 10 years.

Actual work proceeded very slowly, taking 15 years just to open the first part of the track from Bovisa to Porta Venezia. From 1997 only a shuttle service was operated on the partially completed track. Two years later the Certosa branch was opened and was completed in 2002 with the opening of the new Villapizzone station. In the same year the Passante was expanded on the south-east to Dateo.

In 2004, in conjunction with the opening of Porta Vittoria station, the new suburban service was activated. The cost at that time was already €915 million after 22 years of construction work.

The railway was completed in 2008 with the connection to the last station, Rogoredo.

== See also ==
- List of railway lines in Italy
- Passante Ferroviario di Napoli

== Bibliography ==
- (in Italian) Fernando Malusardi: Il passante ferroviario di Milano. In: ″Ingegneria Ferroviaria″, July 1982, p. 478–484.
