= Milano Rogoredo railway station =

Railway station in Milan, Italy

Milano Rogoredo
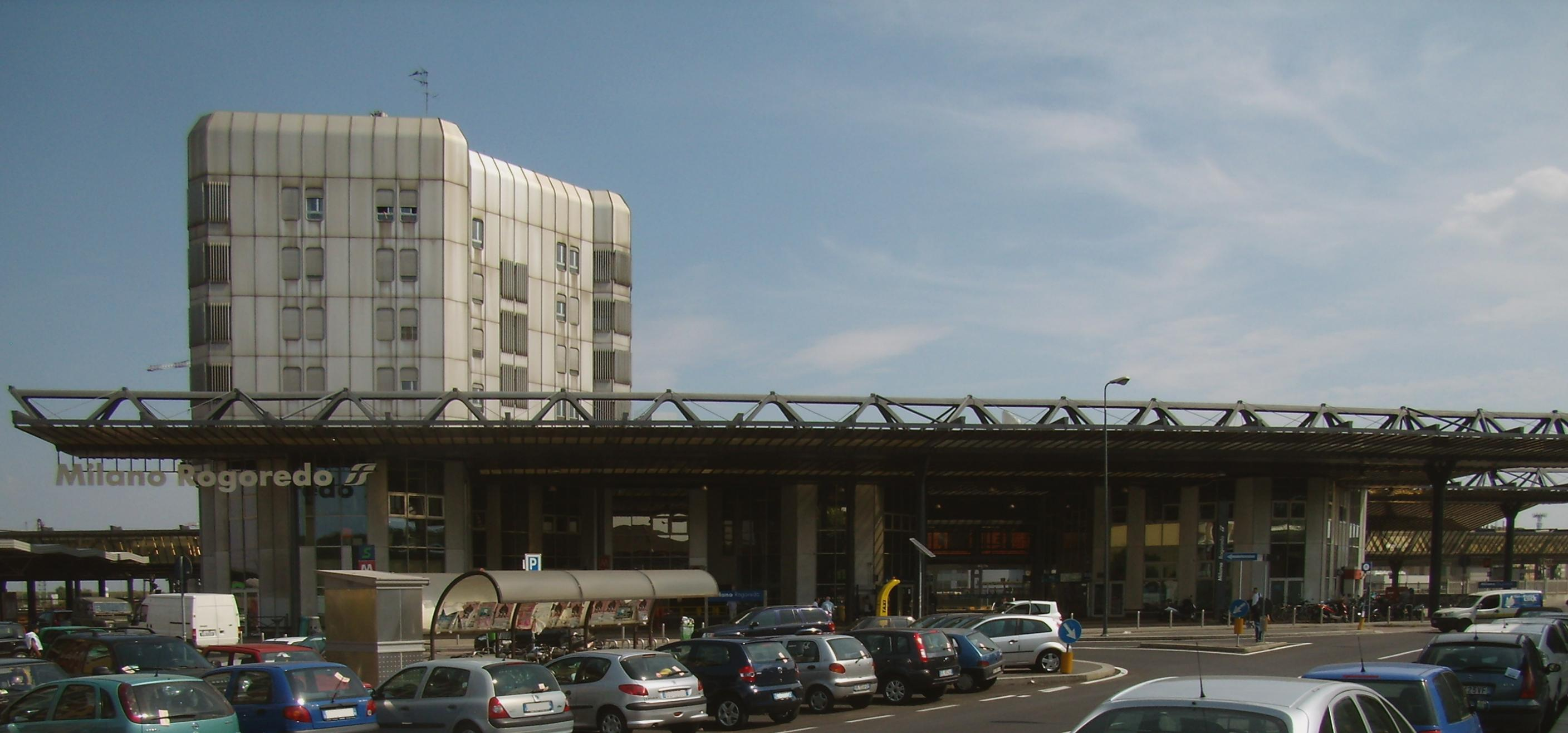

General information
- Location: Via Cassinis 83, Milan; Italy
- Coordinates: 45°26′01″N 09°14′21″E
- Owner: Rete Ferroviaria Italiana
- Operator: Centostazioni
- Lines: Milan–Bologna HS; Milan–Bologna; Milan–Genoa; Passante
- Distance: 9.567 km (5.945 mi) from Milano Centrale; 208.751 km (129.712 mi) from Bologna
- Tracks: 13
- Train operators: Trenitalia; Trenord
- Connections: Rogoredo MM

Construction
- Architect: Angelo Mangiarotti

Other information
- IATA code: IMR
- Fare zone: STIBM: Mi1

History
- Opened: 1862
- Electrified: 1938

Services
Preceding station	Trenord	Following station
Milano Porta Vittoria towards Saronno	Line S1 (Milan suburban railway service)	San Donato Milanese towards Lodi
Milano Porta Vittoria towards Mariano Comense	Line S2 (Milan suburban railway service)	Terminus
Milano Porta Vittoria towards Cormano–Cusano Milanino	Line S12 (Milan suburban railway service)	San Donato Milanese towards Melegnano
Milano Porta Vittoria towards Milano Bovisa	Line S13 (Milan suburban railway service)	Locate Triulzi towards Pavia
Location
- Location within Milan Location within Lombardy Location within Northern Italy Location within Italy

Milano Rogoredo (IATA: IMR) is a railway station in Milan, Italy. It is one of the key nodes of the Milan suburban railway service as the southern gateway of the Milanese urban network.

== History ==
=== Early history ===
The station's location was originally (as of 1891) a junction for the old cargo station of Milano Sempione; it became a cargo station itself in 1908. Its function was to serve as the cargo station for the then-autonomous town of Rogoredo, today included in the city administration as part of Milan's southeastern border with San Donato Milanese.

Later, in the late 1950s, it was expanded to a passenger station. This step came when the city of Milan started to grow faster and various factories were established in the area, such as the Montedison chemical facility and the Redaelli steel plant. The station grew proportionally with the industrial development of the area.

=== Recent history ===
A modernization of the station was planned in the 1990s, and some reconstruction of the station was carried out including platform roofing. However, in 1995, work was stopped due to costs exceeding the budgeted funds. In 1999, work restarted to add four tracks to allow integration with the Passante railway and the high-speed line, as well as to complete the platform roofing.

The importance of this station has increased with the extension of the Milan suburban railway service to Pavia and Lodi, and the new residential district called Santa Giulia. The station is fully operational. The station includes a stop for the Regionale trains from Parma to the Milano Centrale station, and it became possible in August 2009 to change to the S-lines for connections through the Passante into Central Milan and on to Malpensa Airport at Bovisa.

Several of Trenitalia's Frecciarossa trains between Milan and Rome stop in Rogoredo, as well as Italo trains of high-speed competitor Nuovo Trasporto Viaggiatori.

Since September 2012 a FrecciaClub has taken the place of the previous waiting room.

== Train services ==
The station is served by the following service(s):

- High speed services (Frecciarossa) Turin - Milan - Bologna - Florence - Rome - Naples - Salerno
- High speed services (Italo) Turin - Milan - Bologna - Florence - Rome - Naples - Salerno
- High speed services (Italo) Turin - Milan - Bologna - Ancona
