= Garbagnate Milanese railway station =

Railway station in Italy

Garbagnate Milanese

General information
- Location: Garbagnate Milanese, Milan, Lombardy; Italy
- Coordinates: 45°34′49″N 09°04′49″E
- Operator: Ferrovienord
- Line: Milan–Saronno
- Distance: 14.768 km (9.176 mi) from Milano Cadorna
- Platforms: 3
- Tracks: 4
- Train operators: Trenord

Other information
- Fare zone: STIBM: Mi4

History
- Opened: 5 October 1878; 147 years ago
- Rebuilt: 1991; 35 years ago

Services
| Preceding station | Trenord | Following station |
|---|---|---|
| Cesate towards Saronno | Line S1 (Milan suburban railway service) | Garbagnate Parco delle Groane towards Lodi |
| Cesate towards Saronno | Line S3 (Milan suburban railway service) | Garbagnate Parco delle Groane towards Milano Cadorna |
| Terminus | Line S13 (Milan suburban railway service) | Garbagnate Parco delle Groane towards Pavia |
Location
- Location within Lombardy Location within Northern Italy Location within Italy

Garbagnate Milanese railway station is a railway station in Italy. It serves the town of Garbagnate Milanese.

== Services ==
Garbagnate Milanese is served by the lines S1, S3 and S13 of the Milan suburban railway network, operated by the Lombard railway company Trenord.

== See also ==
- Milan suburban railway network
