= Garbagnate Parco delle Groane railway station =

Railway halt in Italy

Garbagnate Parco delle Groane
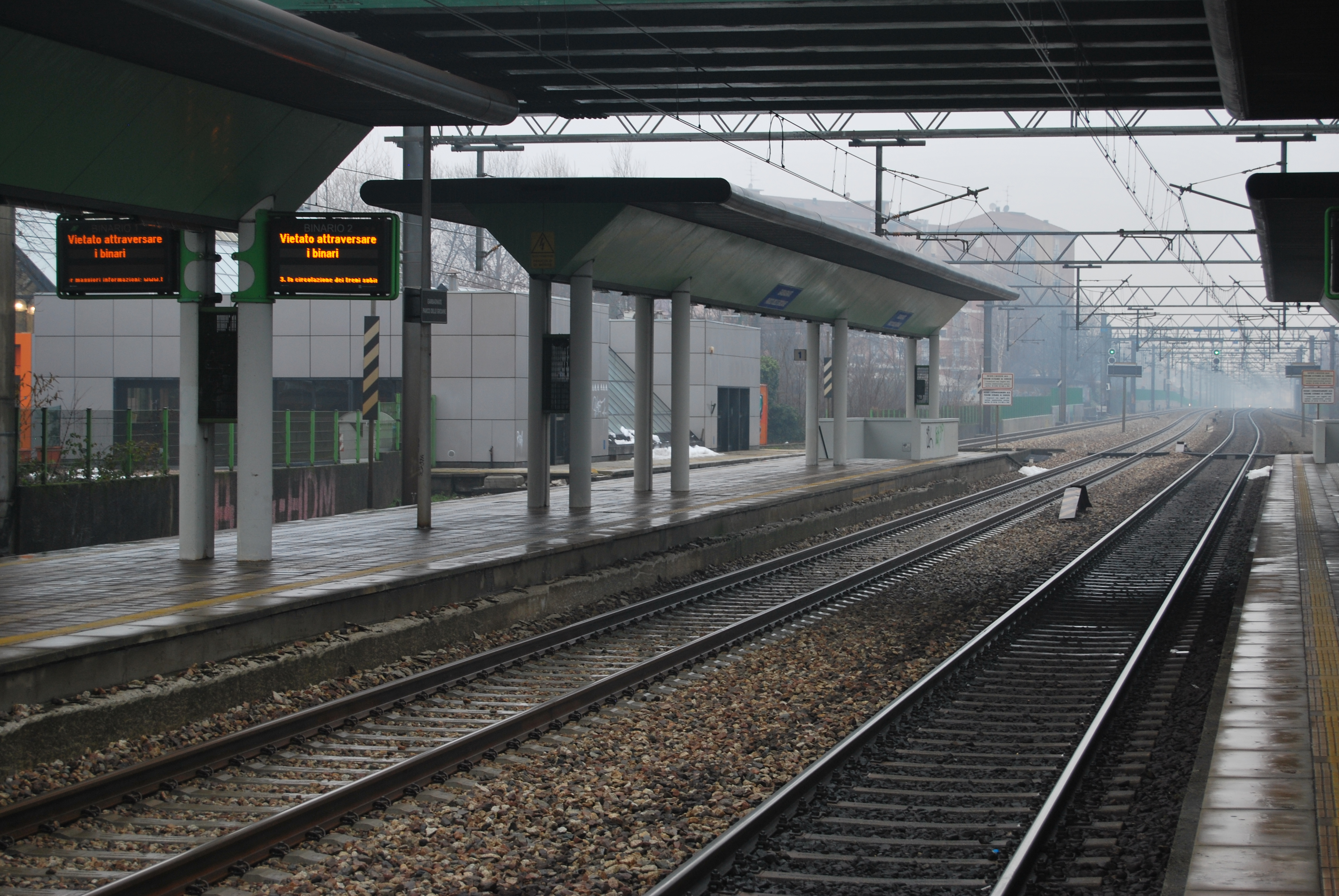

General information
- Location: Garbagnate Milanese, Milan, Lombardy; Italy
- Coordinates: 45°34′16″N 09°05′27″E
- Operator: Ferrovienord
- Line: Milan–Saronno
- Distance: 13.496 km (8.386 mi) from Milano Cadorna
- Platforms: 3
- Tracks: 4
- Train operators: Trenord

Other information
- Fare zone: STIBM: Mi4

History
- Opened: 5 October 1991; 34 years ago

Services
Preceding station	Trenord	Following station
Garbagnate Milanese towards Saronno	Line S1 (Milan suburban railway service)	Bollate Nord towards Lodi
Garbagnate Milanese towards Saronno	Line S3 (Milan suburban railway service)	Bollate Nord towards Milano Cadorna
Location
- Location within Lombardy Location within Northern Italy Location within Italy

Garbagnate Parco delle Groane railway station is a railway station in Italy. It serves the southern suburb of the town of Garbagnate Milanese.

== Services ==
Garbagnate Parco delle Groane is served by the lines S1, S3 and S13 of the Milan suburban railway network, operated by the Lombard railway company Trenord.

== See also ==
- Milan suburban railway network
