= Cesate railway station =

Railway station in Italy

Cesate
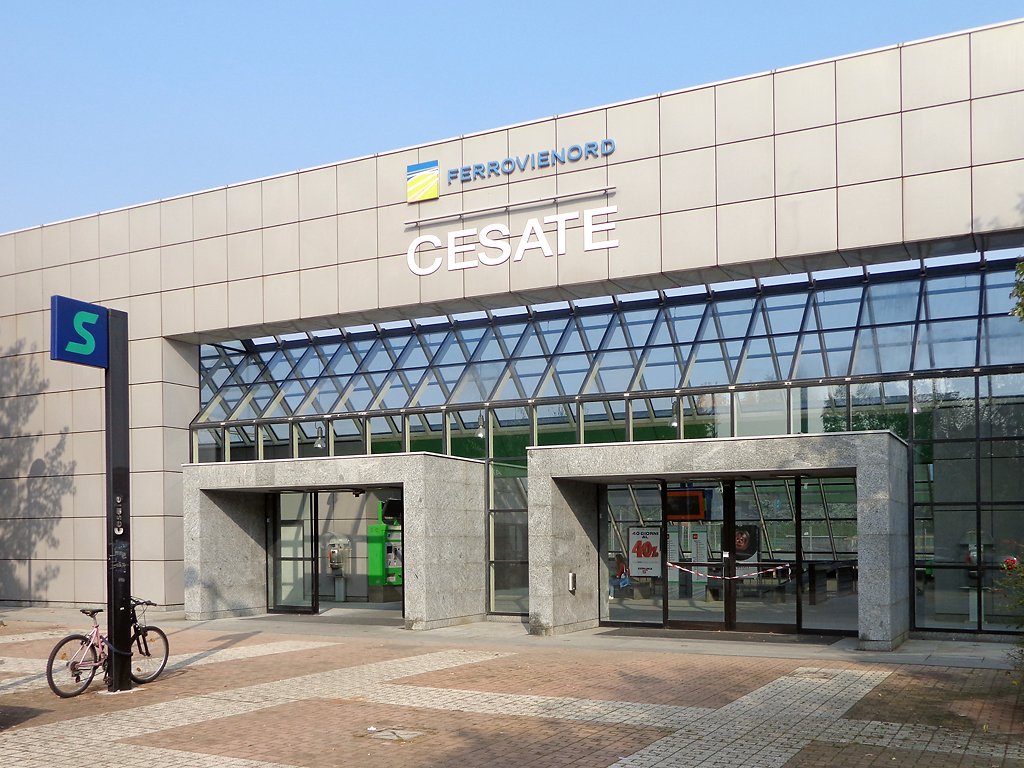

General information
- Location: Cesate, Milan, Lombardy; Italy
- Coordinates: 45°35′27″N 09°03′59″E
- Operator: Ferrovienord
- Line: Milan–Saronno
- Distance: 16.408 km (10.195 mi) from Milano Cadorna
- Platforms: 3
- Tracks: 4
- Train operators: Trenord

Other information
- Fare zone: STIBM: Mi5

History
- Opened: 5 January 1955; 71 years ago
- Rebuilt: 1988; 38 years ago

Services
Preceding station	Trenord	Following station
Caronno Pertusella towards Saronno	Line S1 (Milan suburban railway service)	Garbagnate Milanese towards Lodi
Caronno Pertusella towards Saronno	Line S3 (Milan suburban railway service)	Garbagnate Milanese towards Milano Cadorna
Location
- Location within Lombardy Location within Northern Italy Location within Italy

Cesate railway station is a railway station in Italy. It serves the town of Cesate.

== Services ==
Cesate is served by lines S1 and S3 of the Milan suburban railway network, operated by the Lombard railway company Trenord.

== See also ==
- Milan suburban railway network
