= Bollate Nord railway station =

Railway station in Treviso, Italy

Bollate Nord
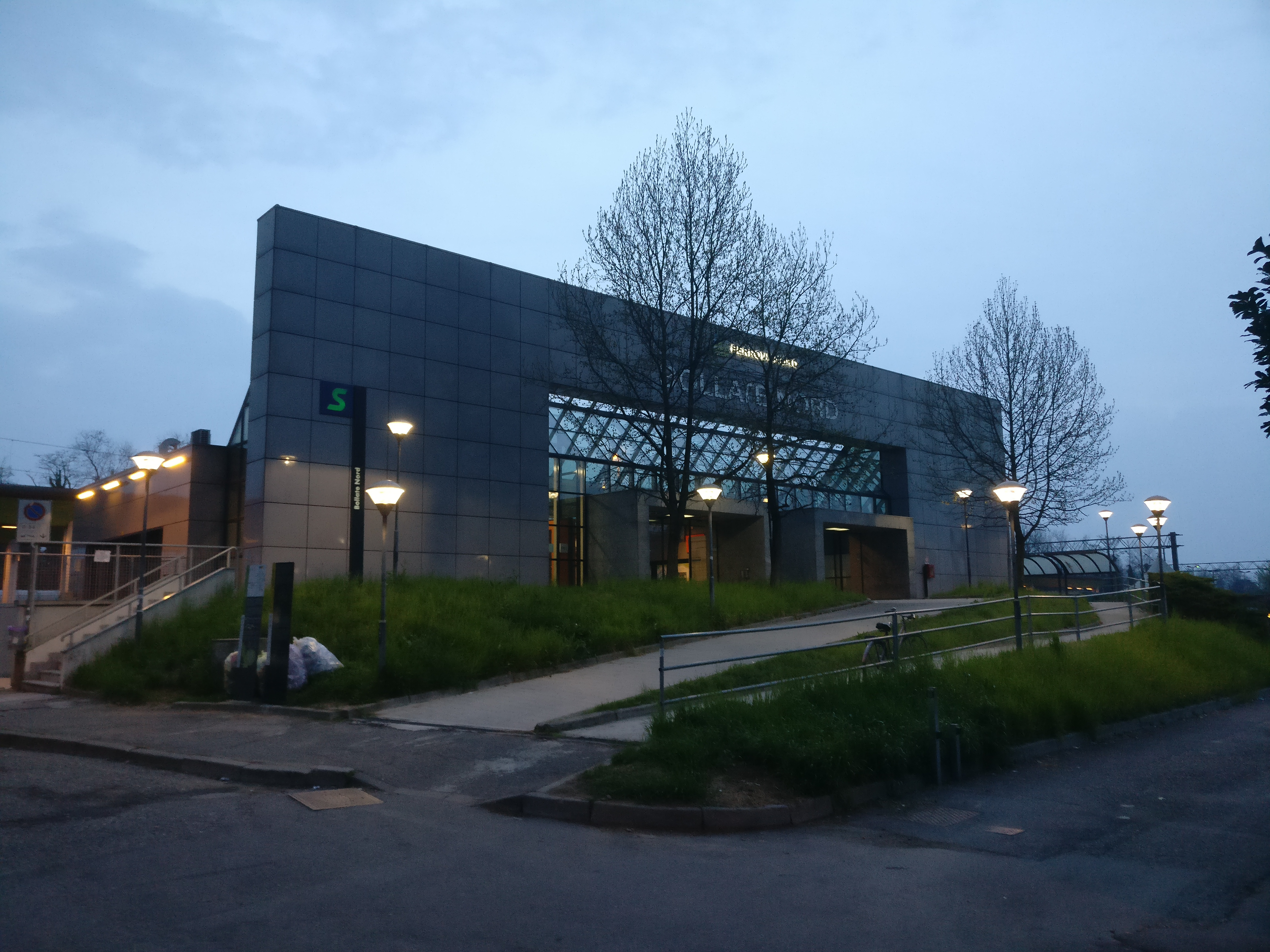

General information
- Location: Via Vittorio Veneto; Bollate, Milan, Lombardy; Italy
- Coordinates: 45°33′09″N 09°06′44″E
- Owner: Ferrovienord
- Operator: Trenord
- Line: Milan–Saronno
- Distance: 10.857 km (6.746 mi) from Milano Cadorna
- Platforms: 2
- Tracks: 4

Other information
- Fare zone: STIBM: Mi3

History
- Opened: 1879; 147 years ago
- Rebuilt: 1992; 34 years ago

Services
Preceding station	Trenord	Following station
Garbagnate Parco delle Groane towards Saronno	Line S1 (Milan suburban railway service)	Bollate Centro towards Lodi
Garbagnate Parco delle Groane towards Saronno	Line S3 (Milan suburban railway service)	Bollate Centro towards Milano Cadorna
Location
- Location within Lombardy Location within Northern Italy Location within Italy

Bollate Nord railway station is a railway station in Italy. It is part of the Milan–Saronno railway and is located in Via Vittorio Veneto, serving the northern part of the town of Bollate.

== Services ==
The station is served by the lines S1, S3 and S13 of the Milan suburban railway service, each with a 30 minutes headway per direction, operated by the Lombard railway company Trenord.

== See also ==
- Milan suburban railway service
