= Caronno Pertusella railway station =

Railway station in Italy

Caronno Pertusella

General information
- Location: Caronno Pertusella, Varese, Lombardy; Italy
- Coordinates: 45°35′53″N 09°03′29″E
- Operator: Ferrovienord
- Line: Milan–Saronno
- Distance: 17.448 km (10.842 mi) from Milano Cadorna
- Platforms: 3
- Tracks: 4
- Train operators: Trenord

Other information
- Fare zone: 5

History
- Opened: 5 October 1879; 146 years ago
- Rebuilt: 1991; 35 years ago

Services
Preceding station	Trenord	Following station
Saronno Sud towards Saronno	Line S1 (Milan suburban railway service)	Cesate towards Lodi
Saronno Sud towards Saronno	Line S3 (Milan suburban railway service)	Cesate towards Milano Cadorna
Location
- Location within Lombardy Location within Northern Italy Location within Italy

Caronno Pertusella railway station is a railway station in Italy. It serves the town of Caronno Pertusella.

== Services ==
Caronno Pertusella is served by the lines S1 and S3 of the Milan suburban railway network, operated by the lombard railway company Trenord.

== See also ==
- List of Milan S Lines stations
