= Novate Milanese railway station =

Railway station in Italy

Novate Milanese
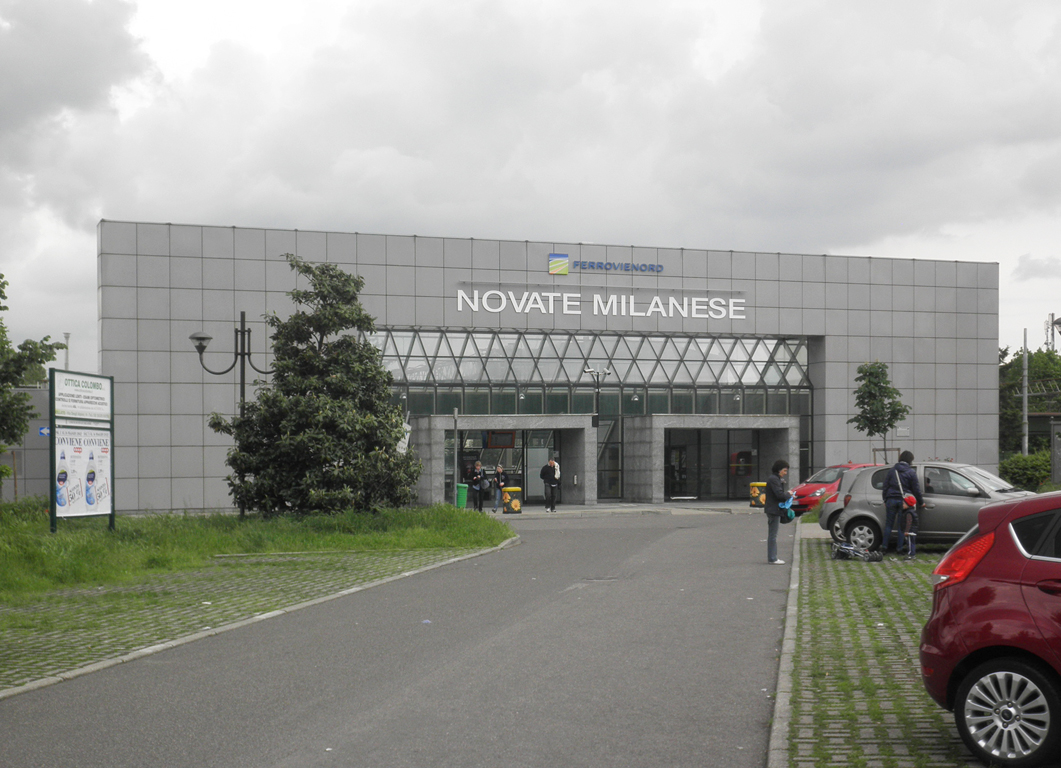

General information
- Location: Piazza Giovanni Testori, 1 Novate Milanese, Milan, Lombardy; Italy
- Coordinates: 45°31′59″N 09°07′57″E
- Owner: Ferrovienord
- Operator: Trenord
- Line: Milan–Saronno
- Distance: 8.162 km (5.072 mi) from Milano Cadorna
- Platforms: 2
- Tracks: 4

Other information
- Fare zone: STIBM: Mi3

History
- Opened: 1879
- Rebuilt: 1992

Services
Preceding station	Trenord	Following station
Bollate Centro towards Saronno	Line S1 (Milan suburban railway service)	Milano Quarto Oggiaro towards Lodi
Bollate Centro towards Saronno	Line S3 (Milan suburban railway service)	Milano Quarto Oggiaro towards Milano Cadorna
Location
- Location within Milan Location within Lombardy Location within Northern Italy Location within Italy

Novate Milanese railway station is a railway station in Italy. Located in the Milan–Saronno railway, it serves the town of Novate Milanese. The ancient station of 1879 was demolished in 1992, when the actual building was opened.

== Services ==
The station is served by lines S1, S3 and S13 of the Milan suburban railway network, operated by the Lombard railway company Trenord.

== See also ==
- Milan suburban railway network
