= Bollate Centro railway station =

Railway station in Italy

Bollate Centro

General information
- Location: Piazza Carlo Marx; Bollate, Milan, Lombardy; Italy
- Coordinates: 45°32′35″N 09°07′23″E
- Owner: Ferrovienord
- Operator: Trenord
- Line: Milan–Saronno
- Distance: 9.472 km (5.886 mi) from Milano Cadorna
- Platforms: 2
- Tracks: 4

Other information
- Fare zone: STIBM: Mi3

History
- Opened: 1879; 147 years ago
- Rebuilt: 1992; 34 years ago

Services
| Preceding station | Trenord | Following station |
|---|---|---|
| Bollate Nord towards Saronno | Line S1 (Milan suburban railway service) | Novate Milanese towards Lodi |
| Bollate Nord towards Saronno | Line S3 (Milan suburban railway service) | Novate Milanese towards Milano Cadorna |
Location
- Location within Milan Location within Lombardy Location within Northern Italy Location within Italy

Bollate Centro railway station is a railway station in Italy. Located in the Milan–Saronno railway, it serves the centre of the town of Bollate. The station is located at Piazza Carlo Marx. The ancient station of 1879 was demolished in 1992, when the actual building was opened.

== Services ==
The station is served by lines S1, S3 and S13 of the Milan suburban railway service, operated by the Lombard railway company Trenord.

== See also ==
- Milan suburban railway service
