= Milano Quarto Oggiaro railway station =

Railway station in Milan, Italy

Milano Quarto Oggiaro
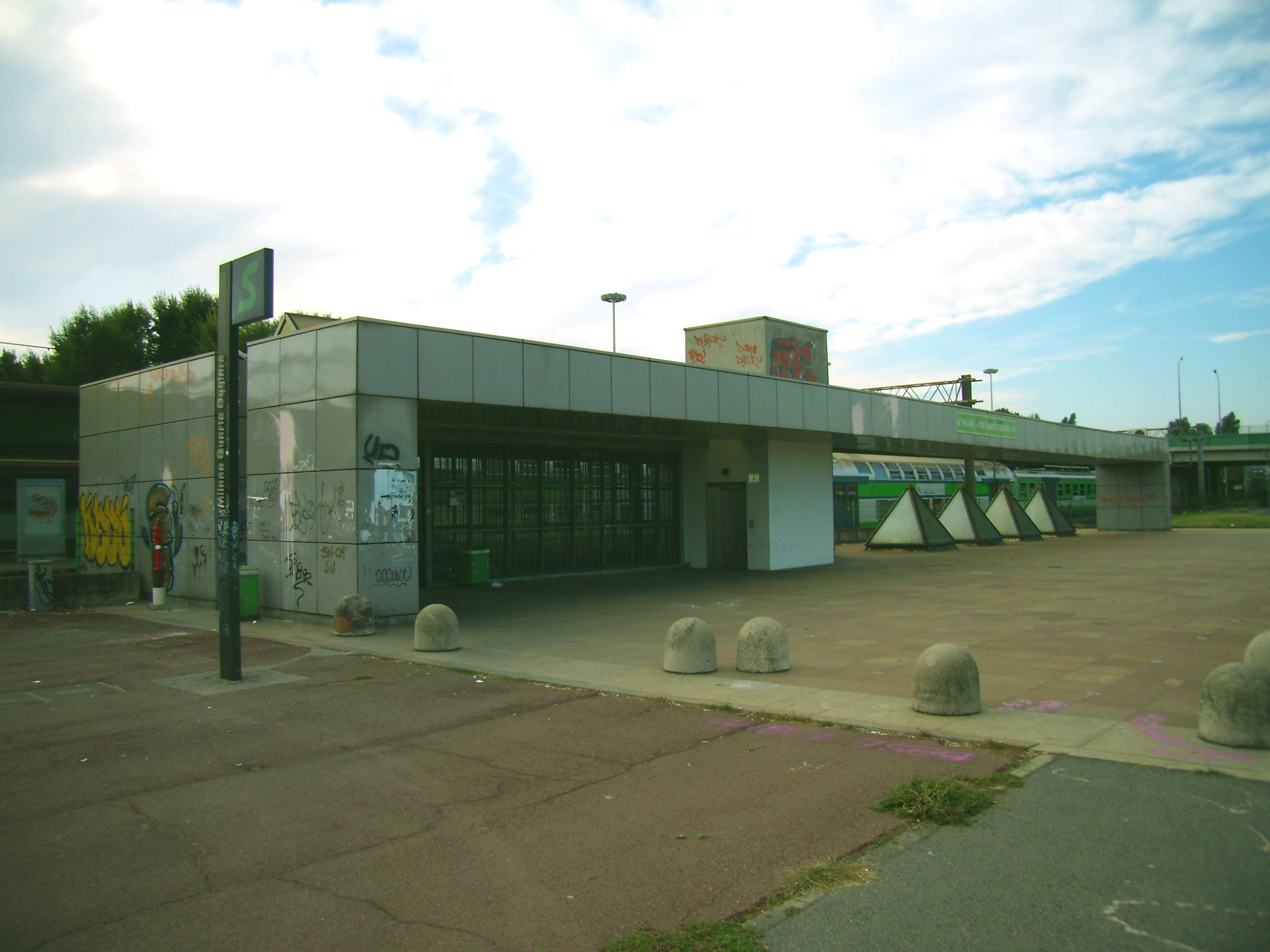

General information
- Location: Via Carlo Amoretti, 68; Milan, Milan, Lombardy; Italy
- Coordinates: 45°31′10″N 09°08′42″E
- Owner: Ferrovienord
- Operator: Trenord
- Line: Milan–Saronno
- Distance: 6.339 km (3.939 mi) from Milano Cadorna
- Platforms: 2
- Tracks: 4
- Connections: ATM buses

Other information
- Fare zone: STIBM: Mi1

History
- Opened: 1879; 147 years ago
- Rebuilt: 1991; 35 years ago

Services
Preceding station	Trenord	Following station
Novate Milanese towards Saronno	Line S1 (Milan suburban railway service)	Milano Bovisa towards Lodi
Novate Milanese towards Saronno	Line S3 (Milan suburban railway service)	Milano Bovisa towards Milano Cadorna
Location
- Location within Milan Location within Lombardy Location within Northern Italy Location within Italy

Milano Quarto Oggiaro is a surface suburban railway station in the Quarto Oggiaro district in Milan, Italy.

== Services ==
The station is served by lines S1, S3 and S13 of the Milan suburban railway service, operated by the Lombard railway company Trenord.

The station is located on Via Carlo Amoretti.

== See also ==
- Railway stations in Milan
- Milan suburban railway service
