= Line S3 (Milan suburban railway service) =

Suburban rail service in Milan

Saronno–Milano Cadorna
- S3

Overview
- Service type: Commuter rail
- System: Milan suburban railway service
- Status: Operational
- Locale: Milan, Italy
- First service: 2004
- Current operator: Trenord
- Website: Trenord (in Italian)

Route
- Termini: Saronno; Milano Cadorna
- Stops: 13
- Distance travelled: 21 km (13 mi)

Technical
- Track gauge: 1,435 mm (4 ft 8 1/2 in)
- Electrification: 3,000 V DC
- Timetable number: S3
Route map
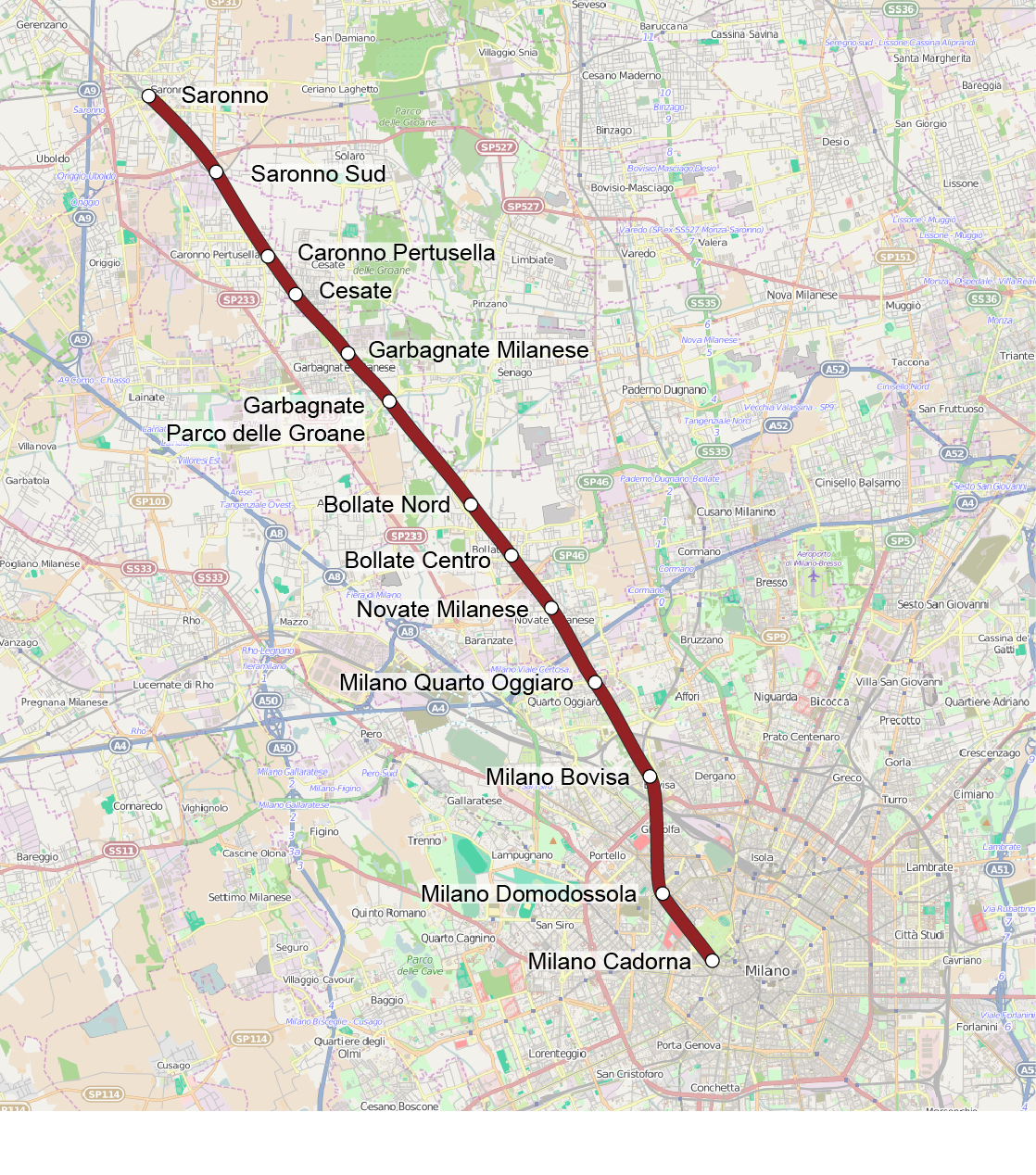

The S3 is a commuter rail route forming part of the Milan suburban railway service (Italian: Servizio ferroviario suburbano di Milano), which converges on the city of Milan, Italy.

The service runs over the Milan–Saronno railway, the oldest line owned by the Ferrovie Nord Milano. Like all other Milan suburban railway service routes, it is operated by Trenord.

== Route ==
Line S3, a radial route, runs from Saronno in a south easterly direction, via the Milan–Saronno railway, to Milano Cadorna, the railway's urban terminus. The travel takes 35 minutes.

== History ==
The S3 was incorporated into the suburban service on 12 December 2004.

== Stations ==
The stations on the S3 are as follows (stations with blue background are in the municipality of Milan):

Station	Opened	Interchange	Note
Saronno	1879	MXP	
Saronno Sud	1991	Line S1 (Milan suburban railway service) Line S9 (Milan suburban railway service)	
Caronno Pertusella	1991	Line S1 (Milan suburban railway service)	
Cesate	1991	Line S1 (Milan suburban railway service)	
Garbagnate Milanese	1991	Line S13	
Garbagnate Parco delle Groane	1991	Line S1 (Milan suburban railway service)	
Bollate Nord	1991	Line S1 (Milan suburban railway service)	
Bollate Centro	1991	Line S13	
Novate Milanese	1991	Line S1 (Milan suburban railway service)	
Milano Quarto Oggiaro	1991	Line S1 (Milan suburban railway service)	
Milano Bovisa	1879	MXP	
Milano Domodossola	2003	Line M5 Treni regionali	
Milano Cadorna	1879	MXP	

== Scheduling ==
As of 2012, S3 trains ran every thirty minutes between 06:00 and 01:00 daily.

== See also ==
- History of rail transport in Italy
- List of Milan suburban railway stations
- Rail transport in Italy
- Transport in Milan
