= Saronno–Laveno railway =

Railway line in Italy

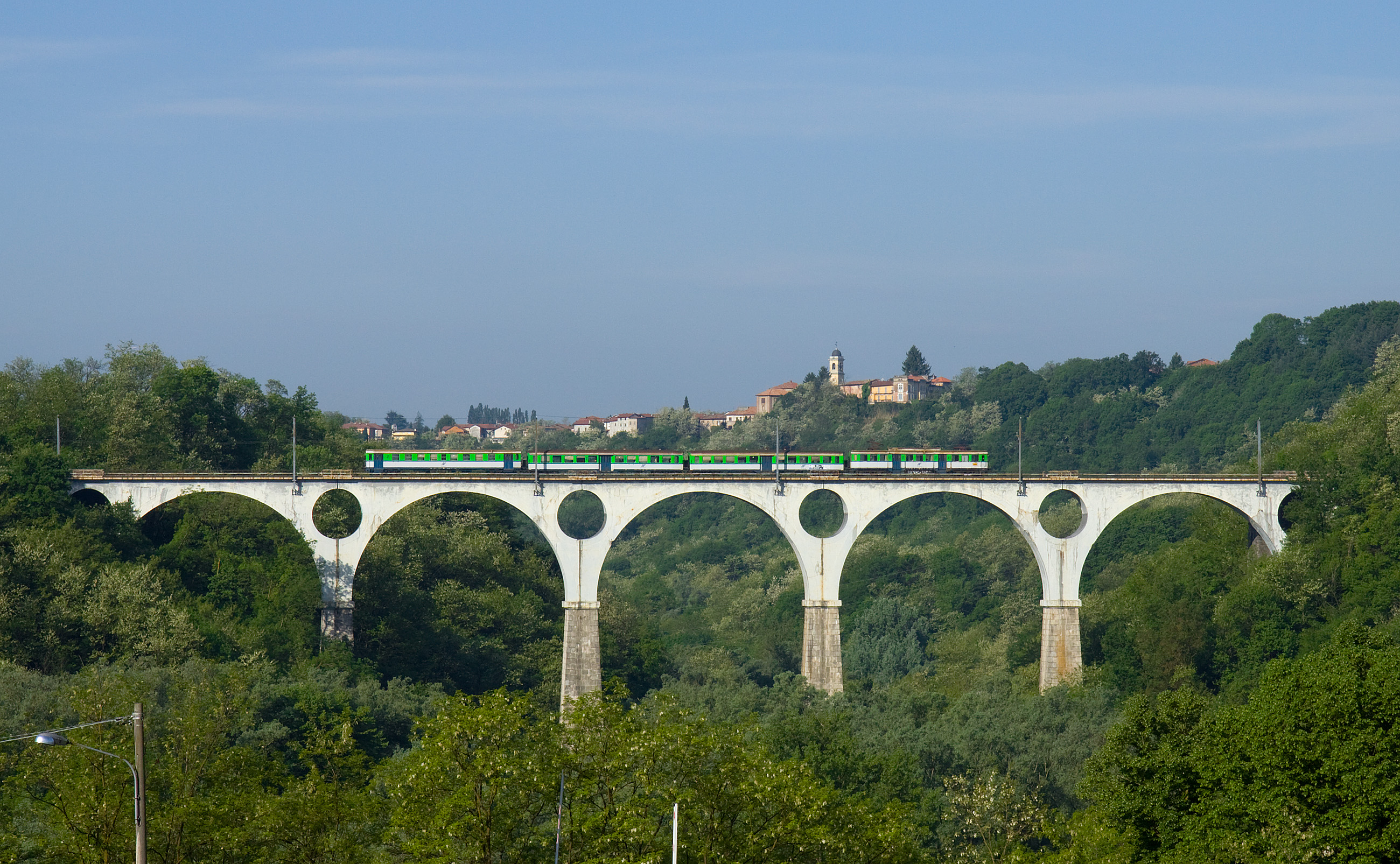
- The viaduct in Malnate

Overview
- Native name: Ferrovia Saronno-Laveno
- Owner: Ferrovienord
- Termini: Saronno railway station; Laveno-Mombello Lago railway station
- Stations: 21

Service
- Type: heavy rail
- Services: R22, RE1
- Operator(s): Trenord

History
- Opened: 1886

Technical
- Line length: 50.995 km (31.687 mi)
- Number of tracks: 2 (Saronno–Malnate); 1 (Malnate–Laveno)
- Track gauge: 1,435 mm (4 ft 8 1/2 in)
- Electrification: 3 kV DC, overhead line
- Operating speed: 140 km/h (87 mph)
- Highest elevation: 374 m (1,227 ft)

Saronno–Laveno railway is a railway line in Lombardy, Italy.

It is one of the three continuations of the Milan-Saronno railway.

== History ==
The line was opened in four parts:

- 17 April 1884: Saronno–Vedano
- 14 August 1884: Vedano–Malnate
- 29 June 1885: Malnate–Varese
- 5 July 1886: Varese–Laveno

== See also ==
- List of railway lines in Italy
