= Caronno =

Caronno may refer to several places:

- Caronno Pertusella, Varese, Lombardy, Italy
- Caronno Varesino, Varese, Lombardy, Italy
