= Line S1 (Milan suburban railway service) =

Suburban rail service in Milan

Saronno–Milano Passante–Lodi
- S1
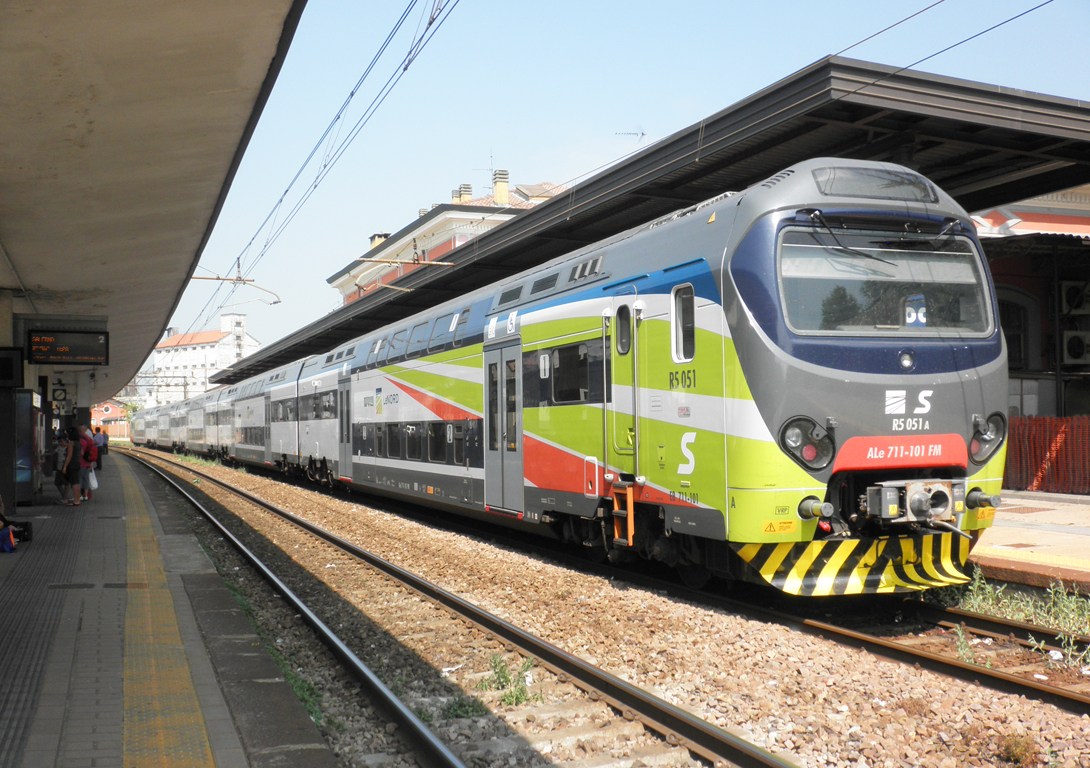
- An S1 train at Lodi.

Overview
- Service type: Commuter rail
- System: Milan suburban railway service
- Status: Operational
- Locale: Milan, Italy
- First service: 2004
- Current operator: Trenord
- Website: Trenord (in Italian)

Route
- Termini: Saronno; Lodi
- Stops: 25
- Distance travelled: 55 km (34 mi)
- Lines used: Milan–Saronno; Milan Passante; Milan–Bologna

Technical
- Rolling stock: Treno Servizio Regionale
- Track gauge: 1,435 mm (4 ft 8 1/2 in)
- Electrification: 3,000 V DC
Route map
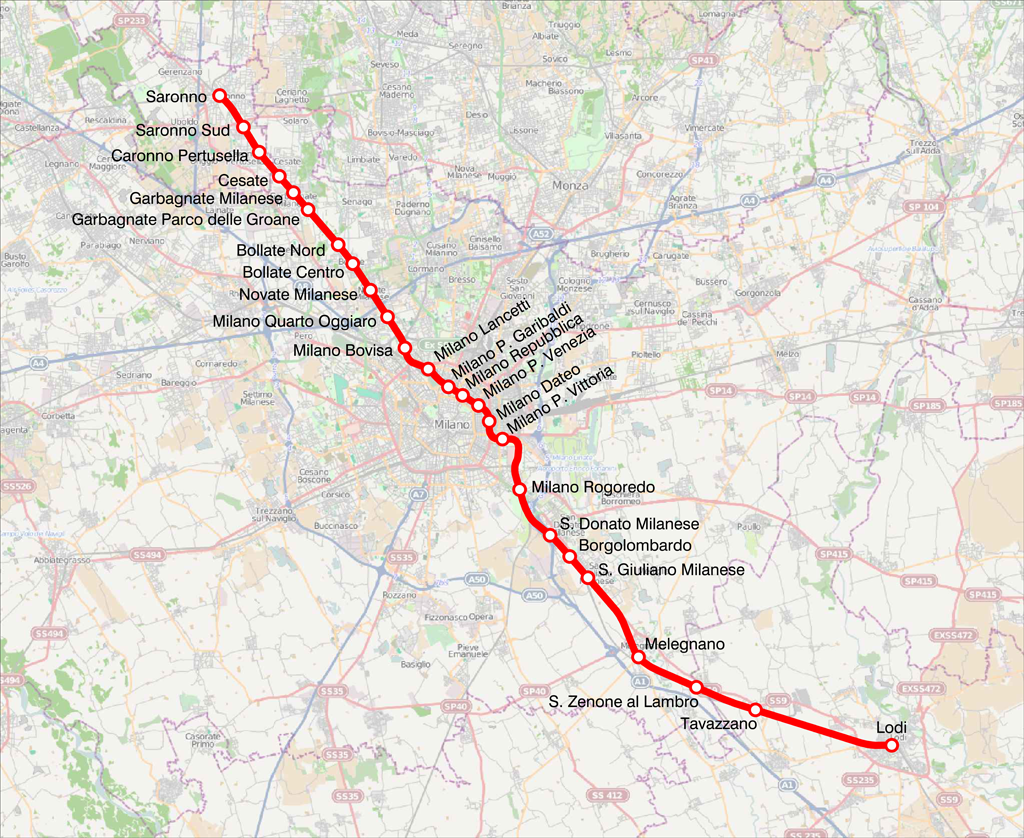

The S1 is a commuter rail route forming part of the Milan suburban railway service (Italian: Servizio ferroviario suburbano di Milano), which converges on the city of Milan, Italy.

The service operates over the Milan–Saronno, Milan Passante, and Milan–Bologna lines. Like all other Milan suburban railway service routes, it is operated by Trenord.

== Route ==
S1, a cross-city route, heads in a southeasterly direction from Saronno to Milano Lancetti. From there, it runs via the Milan Passante railway through the municipality of Milan to Milano Rogoredo, and finally to Lodi. The travel takes 1h29'.

== History ==
The S1 was activated on 12 December 2004, and operated initially between Saronno and Milano Porta Vittoria.

With the change of timetable on 15 June 2008, the service was extended from Milano Porta Vittoria to Milano Rogoredo, where there is an interchange with regional trains and long-distance services to and from Genoa, Bologna and Mantua.

To coincide with another timetable change on 13 December 2009, the service was further extended, from Rogoredo to Lodi, during the day in off-peak hours. From 13 June 2010, all other Monday to Friday services were extended to Lodi.

As of June 2023, all trains run from Saronno to Lodi up to 9.30 p.m; after that and until the end of service, trains are limited to Lodi-Milano Bovisa, where it is possible to cover the remaining part of the route thanks to an interchange with line S3.

== Stations ==
The stations on the S1 are as follows (stations with blue background are in the municipality of Milan):

Station	Interchange	Note
Saronno	MXP	
Saronno Sud	Line S3 (Milan suburban railway service) Line S9 (Milan suburban railway service)	
Caronno Pertusella	Line S3 (Milan suburban railway service)	
Cesate	Line S3 (Milan suburban railway service)	
Garbagnate Milanese	Line S3 (Milan suburban railway service) Line S13 (Milan suburban railway service)	
Garbagnate Parco delle Groane	Line S3 (Milan suburban railway service)	
Bollate Nord	Line S3 (Milan suburban railway service)	
Bollate Centro	Line S3 (Milan suburban railway service) Line S13 (Milan suburban railway service)	
Novate Milanese	Line S3 (Milan suburban railway service)	
Milano Quarto Oggiaro	Line S3 (Milan suburban railway service)	
Milano Bovisa	MXP	
Milano Lancetti	Line S2 (Milan suburban railway service) Line S5 (Milan suburban railway service) Line S6 (Milan suburban railway service) Line S11 (Milan suburban railway service) Line S12 (Milan suburban railway service) Line S13 (Milan suburban railway service)	
Milano Porta Garibaldi	MXP	
Milano Repubblica	Milan Metro Line 4 Line S2 (Milan suburban railway service) Line S5 (Milan suburban railway service) Line S6 (Milan suburban railway service) Line S12 (Milan suburban railway service) Line S13 (Milan suburban railway service)	
Milano Porta Venezia	Milan Metro Line 1 Line S2 (Milan suburban railway service) Line S5 (Milan suburban railway service) Line S6 (Milan suburban railway service) Line S12 (Milan suburban railway service) Line S13 (Milan suburban railway service)	
Milano Dateo	Milan Metro Line 4 Line S2 (Milan suburban railway service) Line S5 (Milan suburban railway service) Line S6 (Milan suburban railway service) Line S12 (Milan suburban railway service) Line S13 (Milan suburban railway service)	
Milano Porta Vittoria	Line S2 (Milan suburban railway service) Line S5 (Milan suburban railway service) Line S6 (Milan suburban railway service) Line S12 (Milan suburban railway service) Line S13 (Milan suburban railway service)	
Milano Rogoredo	Treni regionali	
San Donato Milanese	Line S12 (Milan suburban railway service)	
Borgolombardo	Line S12 (Milan suburban railway service)	
San Giuliano Milanese	Line S12 (Milan suburban railway service)	
Melegnano	Line S12 (Milan suburban railway service)	
San Zenone al Lambro		
Tavazzano		
Lodi	Treni regionali	

== Scheduling ==
As of 2024, S1 trains ran half-hourly up to 9.30 p.m. from Saronno to Lodi, while running only from Lodi to Milano Bovisa (where an interchenge with line S3 allows to continue the journey to Saronno) till the end of the service.

== See also ==
- History of rail transport in Italy
- List of Milan suburban railway stations
- Rail transport in Italy
- Transport in Milan
