= Laveno-Mombello Lago railway station =

Railway station in Italy

Laveno-Mombello Lago
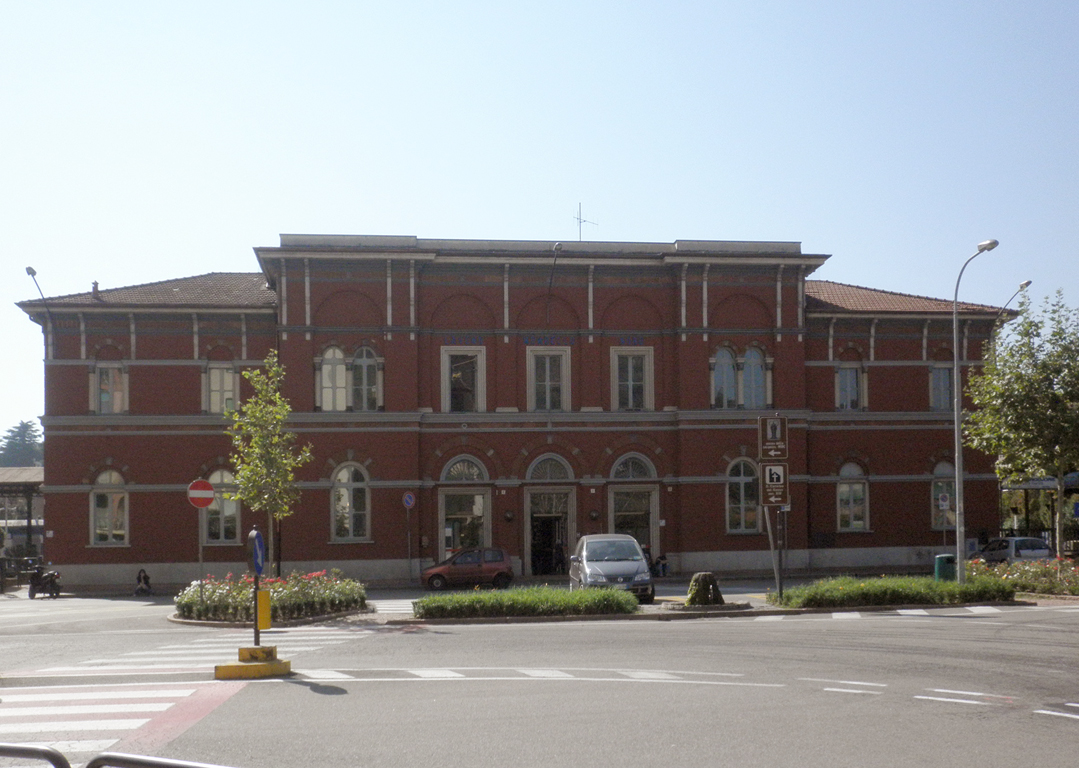

General information
- Location: Via Gaggetto 1 Laveno-Mombello, Varese, Lombardy; Italy
- Coordinates: 45°54′30″N 08°37′07″E
- Operator: Ferrovienord
- Line: Milan–Laveno
- Distance: 72.152 km (44.833 mi) from Milan
- Train operators: Trenord

History
- Opened: 5 June 1886; 140 years ago
Location
- Location within Lombardy Location within Northern Italy Location within Italy

Laveno-Mombello Lago is a railway station in Italy. It is the end of the Saronno–Laveno railway.

It serves the town of Laveno-Mombello, and is joined by a junction track to the Laveno-Mombello railway station, managed by Ferrovie dello Stato.

== Services ==
Laveno-Mombello is served by the regional trains operated by the lombard railway company Trenord.

== See also ==
- Laveno-Mombello

Preceding station	Ferrovie Nord Milano	Following station
Terminus	Trenord; R22	Cittiglio toward Milan Cadorna
Terminus	Trenord; RE1	Cittiglio toward Milan Cadorna
