= Milano Domodossola railway station =

Railway station in Milan, Italy

Milano Domodossola
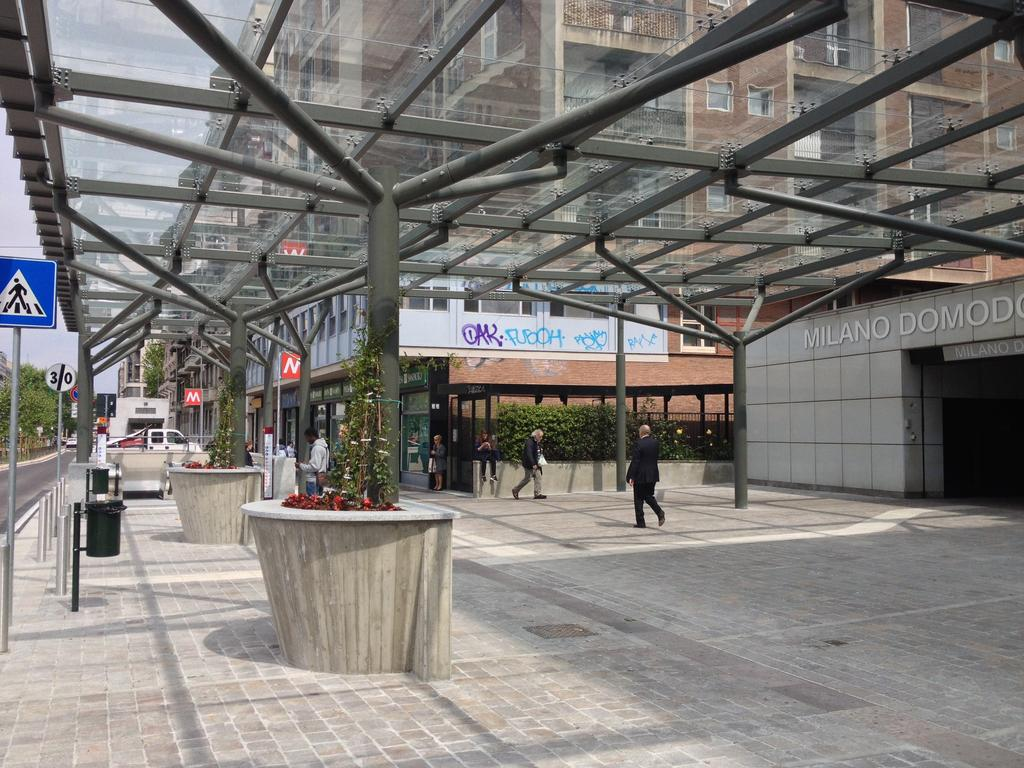

General information
- Location: Via Domodossola, 15; Milan, Milan, Lombardy; Italy
- Coordinates: 45°28′52″N 09°09′43″E
- Owner: Ferrovienord
- Operator: Trenord
- Lines: Milan–Asso; Milan–Saronno
- Distance: 1.720 km (1.069 mi) from Milano Cadorna
- Platforms: 3
- Tracks: 4
- Connections: Domodossola MM: ATM trams; ATM buses

Other information
- Fare zone: STIBM: Mi1

History
- Opened: 15 May 2003; 23 years ago

Services
Preceding station	Trenord	Following station
Milano Bovisa towards Saronno	Line S3 (Milan suburban railway service)	Milano Cadorna Terminus
Milano Bovisa towards Camnago–Lentate	Line S4 (Milan suburban railway service)	Milano Cadorna Terminus
Location
- Location within Milan Location within Lombardy Location within Northern Italy Location within Italy

Milano Domodossola is an underground railway station in Milan, Italy. It is served by the Milan suburban railway service, and by Trenord regional lines. It is a modern station, substituting the nearby, demolished 19th-century Milano Bullona station. The station is located on Via Domodossola.

== See also ==
- Railway stations in Milan
- Milan suburban railway service
