= SC Caronnese SSD =

Italian football club

Caronnese
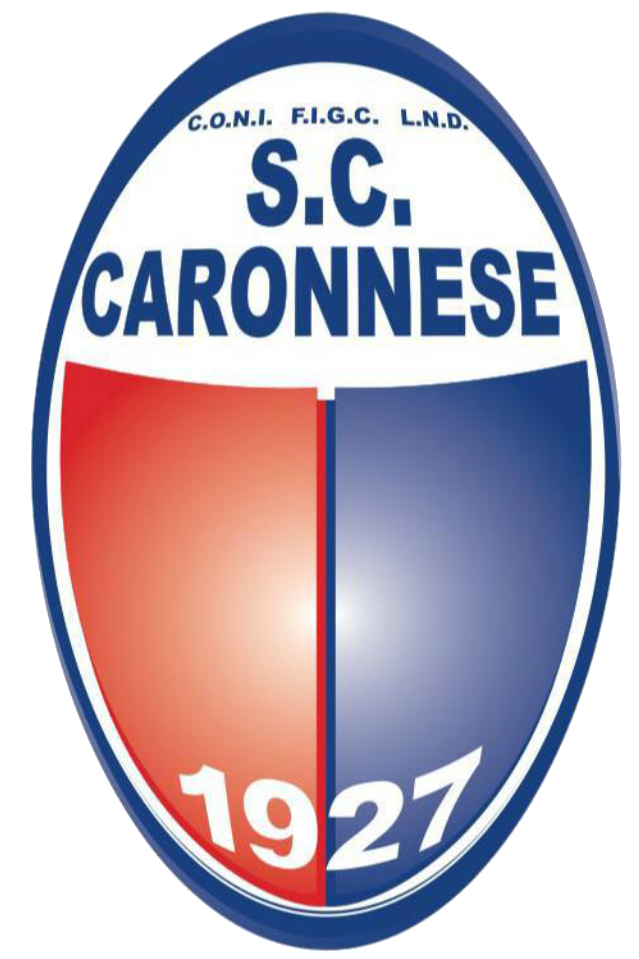
- Full name: Società Calcistica Caronnese Società Sportiva Dilettantistica a r.l.
- Founded: 2009; 17 years ago (as S.C. Insubria CaronneseTurate A.S.D.)
- Ground: Stadio Comunale, Caronno Pertusella, Italy
- Capacity: 1,000
- Chairman: Umberto Gambaro
- Manager: Manuel Scalise
- League: Eccellenza
- 2022–23: Serie D/B, 18th
Home colours	Away colours	Third colours

Società Calcistica Caronnese S.S.D., is an Italian association football club located in Caronno Pertusella, Lombardy. It currently plays in Eccellenza.

== History ==
The club was founded in 2009 as Società Calcistica Insubria CaronneseTurate A.S.D. after the merger of Gruppo Sportivo Salus et Virtus Turate (founded in 1927 in Turate in Serie D) and Unione Sportiva Caronnese (founded in 1932 in Caronno Pertusella in Eccellenza).

In 2010 it was renamed Società Calcistica Insubria Caronnese A.S.D. and it took the current denomination in the summer 2011.

== Colors and badge ==
The colors of the team are red and blue.
