= Albizzate–Solbiate Arno railway station =

Railway station in Italy

Albizzate–Solbiate Arno
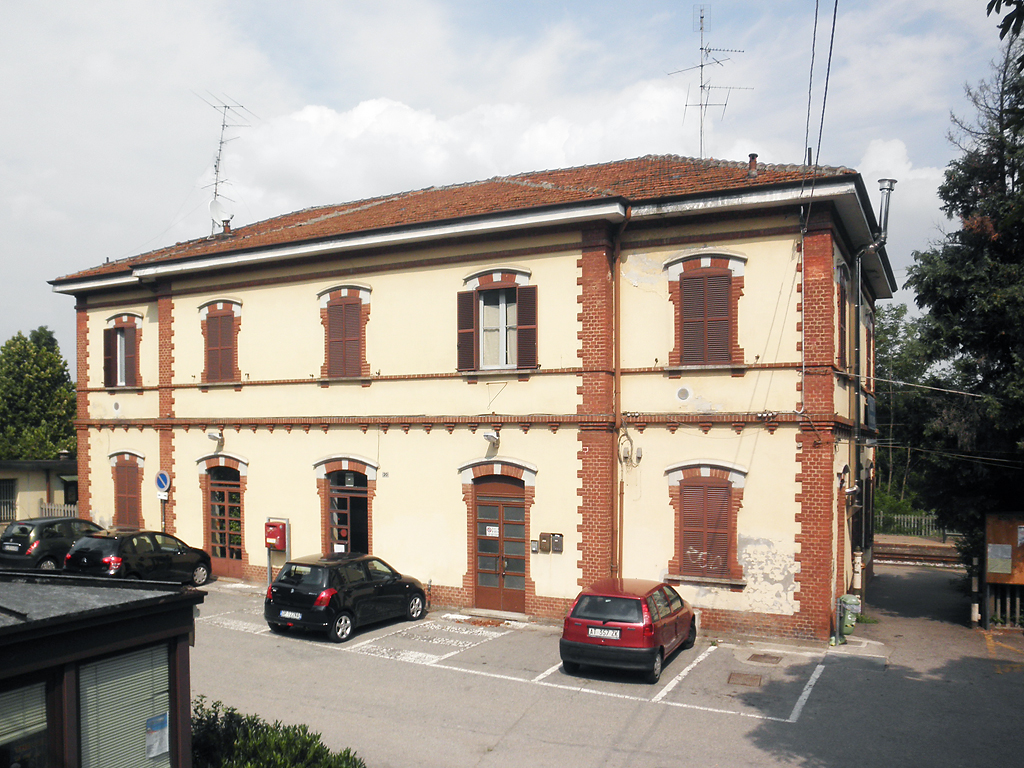

General information
- Location: Via Mazzini 20; Albizzate, Varese, Lombardy; Italy
- Coordinates: 45°43′24″N 08°48′22″E
- Operator: Rete Ferroviaria Italiana
- Line: Porto Ceresio–Milan
- Distance: 7.518 km (4.671 mi) from Gallarate
- Train operators: Trenord

Other information
- Classification: silver

Services
Preceding station	Trenord	Following station
Castronno towards Varese	Line S5 (Milan suburban railway service)	Cavaria–Oggiona–Jerago towards Treviglio
Location
- Location within Lombardy Location within Northern Italy Location within Italy

Albizzate–Solbiate Arno railway station is a railway station in Italy. Located on the Porto Ceresio–Milan railway, it serves the municipalities of Albizzate and Solbiate Arno.

== Services ==
The station is served by the line S5 of Milan suburban railway network, operated by the lombard railway company Trenord.

== See also ==
- Milan suburban railway network
