= Albizzate =

- Comune
- Comune di Albizzate
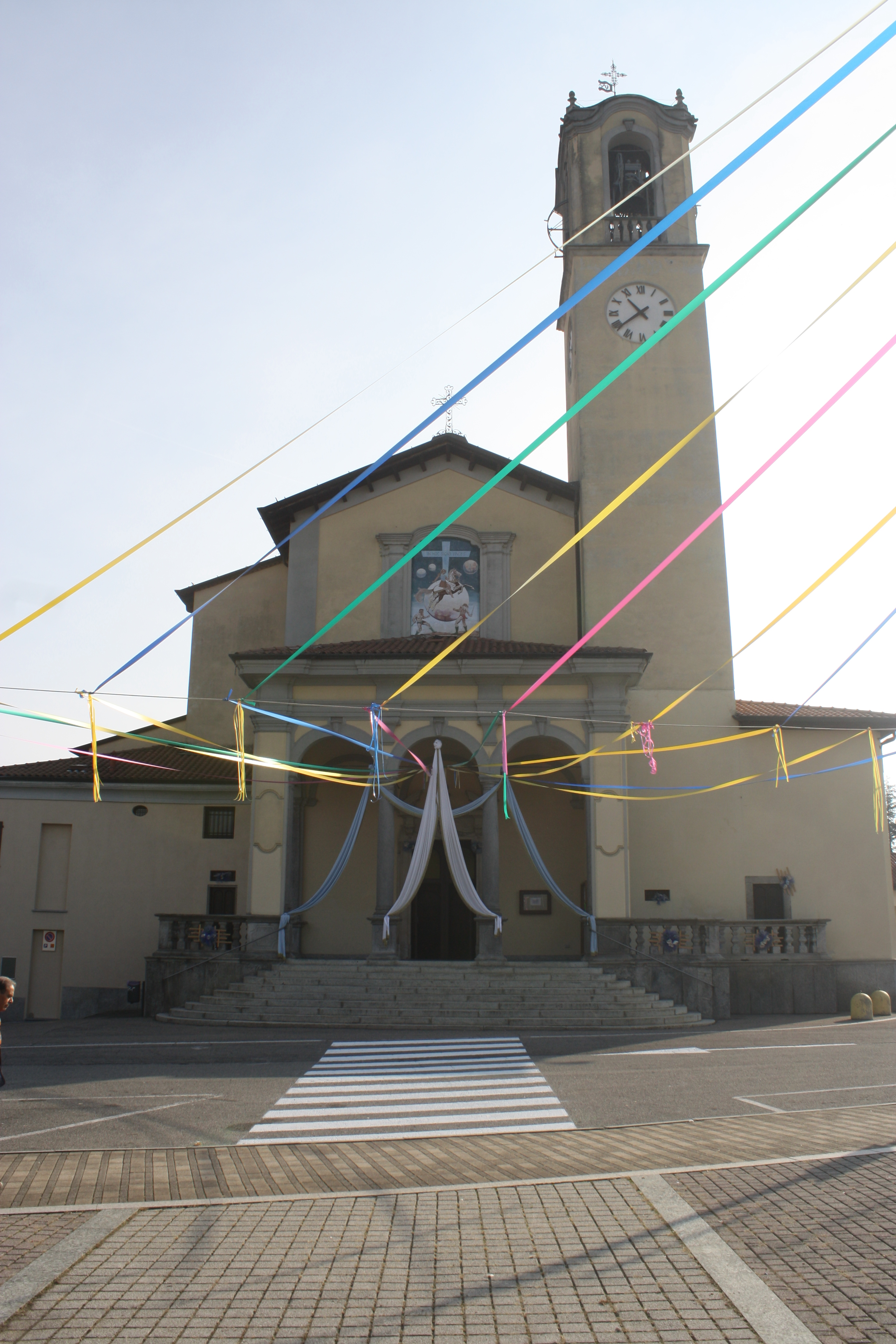
- Chiesa di Sant'Alessandro Martire

- Coat of arms

- Albizzate in the province of Varese

- Location of Albizzate in Italy Albizzate (Lombardy)
- Coordinates: 45°43′N 08°48′E
- Country: Italy
- Region: Lombardy
- Province: Varese (VA)

Government
  - Mayor: Francesco Sommaruga

Area
  - Total: 3 km^{2} (1.2 sq mi)
- Elevation: 334 m (1,096 ft)

Population (2018-01-01)
  - Total: 4,911
  - Density: 1,600/km^{2} (4,200/sq mi)
- Demonym: Albizzatesi
- Time zone: UTC+1 (CET)
  - Summer (DST): UTC+2 (CEST)
- Postal code: 21041
- Dialing code: 0331
- Patron saint: Sant'Alessandro
- Saint day: 26 August
- Website: Official website

Albizzate is a town and comune located in the province of Varese, in the Lombardy region of northern Italy.

It is served by Albizzate-Solbiate Arno railway station.

== Origins of the name ==
Coming from the Latin name of Arvidius (from Arvius), followed by the suffix -ate. Less likely, the name is believed to be connected to the presence of a castle that belonged to the family Albizzi.

== Notable people ==
- Stefano Chiodaroli (1964), actor
- Lucia Bosetti (1989), volleyball player
