= Castronno =

- Comune
- Comune di Castronno
- Coat of arms

- Location within Italy Location within Lombardy
- Coordinates: 45°44′N 8°48′E
- Country: Italy
- Region: Lombardy
- Province: Varese (VA)
- Frazioni: Cascine Maggio, Sant'Alessandro, Collodri

Government
  - Mayor: Giuseppe Gabri

Area
  - Total: 3.7 km^{2} (1.4 sq mi)
- Elevation: 325 m (1,066 ft)

Population (2008)
  - Total: 6,000
  - Density: 1,600/km^{2} (4,200/sq mi)
- Demonym: Castronnesi
- Time zone: UTC+1 (CET)
  - Summer (DST): UTC+2 (CEST)
- Postal code: 21040
- Dialing code: 0332
- Patron saint: Sts. Nazarius and Celsus
- Website: Official website

Castronno is a comune (municipality) in the Province of Varese in the Italian region Lombardy, located about 40 kilometres (25 mi) northwest of Milan and about 10 kilometres (6 mi) southwest of Varese.

It is served by Castronno railway station.

== History ==
Little is known about the story of the village even if historians say that the ruins can be dated back to Roman times. During the Medieval Age, Castronno was involved in a war between the two cities of Milan and Como.
