= Cesate =

Cesate Scesaa (Lombard)
- Comune
- Comune di Cesate
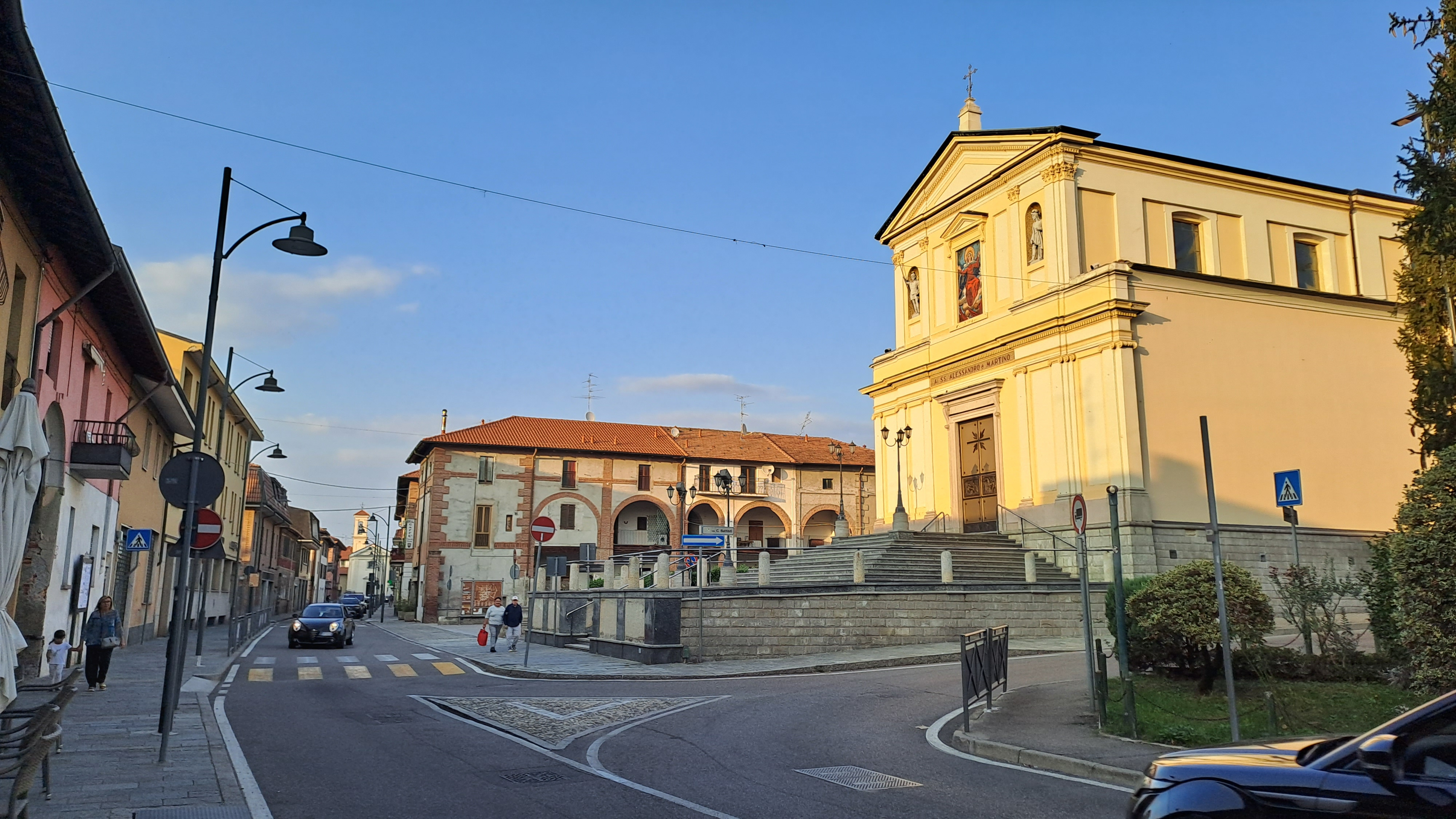
- The main street of the comune with Ss. Alexander and Martin parish church (XIII c.) and the Curt dal Sacrista historical house (XVIII c.)

- Coat of arms

- Location within Italy Location within Lombardy
- Coordinates: 45°36′N 9°5′E
- Country: Italy
- Region: Lombardy
- Metropolitan city: Milan (MI)
- Frazioni: Cascina Biscia, Cascina Selva, Resegone-San Primo

Government
  - Mayor: Roberto Vumbaca (26-5-2019, re-elected on 9-5-2024) (Civic list with LN, FI and FDI)

Area
  - Total: 5.7 km^{2} (2.2 sq mi)
- Elevation: 192 m (630 ft)

Population (28 February 2014)
  - Total: 14,278
  - Density: 2,500/km^{2} (6,500/sq mi)
- Demonym: Cesatesi
- Time zone: UTC+1 (CET)
  - Summer (DST): UTC+2 (CEST)
- Postal code: 20031
- Dialing code: 02
- Patron saint: Saint Alexander and Saint Martin
- Saint day: First or second sunday of September
- Website: Official website

Cesate (Lombard: Scesaa [ʃeˈzaː], locally [ʃɪˈzɑː]) is a comune (municipality) in the Metropolitan City of Milan in the Italian region Lombardy, located about 17 kilometres (11 mi) northwest of Milan.

Cesate borders the following municipalities: Limbiate, Solaro, Caronno Pertusella, Senago, Garbagnate Milanese.

The origin of the flag comes from the noble Cixate family.

== History ==
During the Napoleonic era, the municipality was suppressed by a royal decree of 1809, and annexed to Garbagnate Milanese. Cesate regained its autonomy with the Austrian restoration.
