= Milan S Lines =

Commuter rail system in Milan, Italy

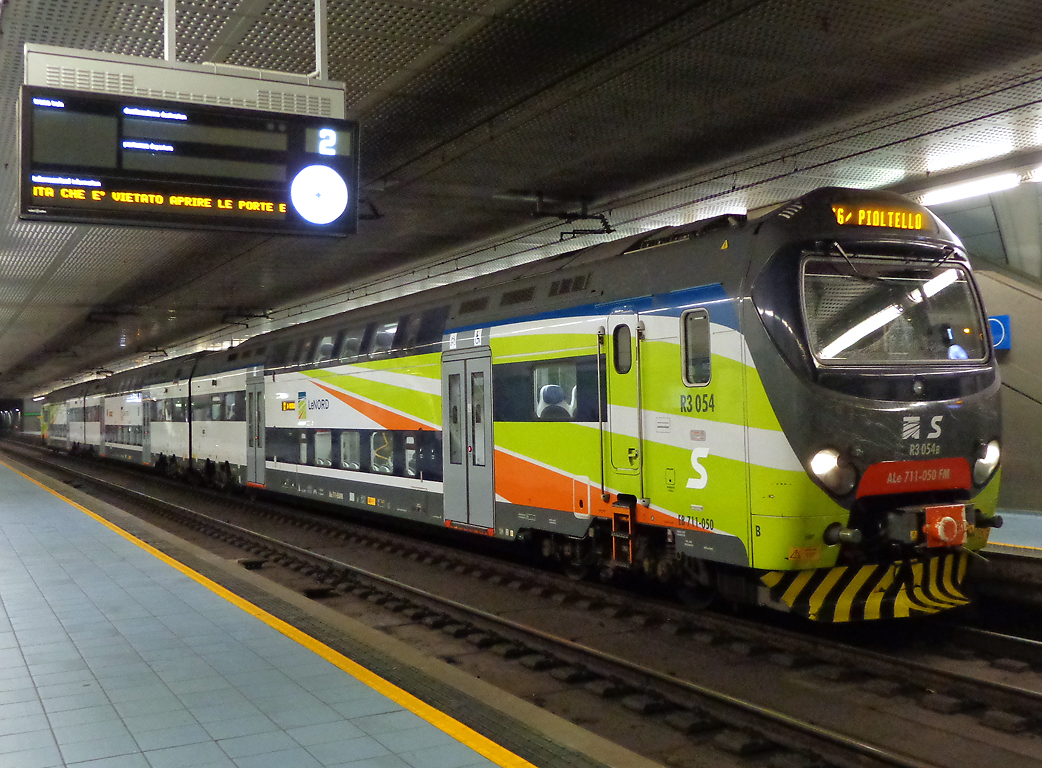
- A TSR train at Milano Porta Venezia railway station

Overview
- Area served: Milan metropolitan area
- Locale: Milan, Lombardy
- Transit type: Commuter rail
- Number of lines: 13
- Number of stations: 124
- Daily ridership: 230,000

Operation
- Began operation: 2004
- Operator: Trenord
- Infrastructure managers: Rete Ferroviaria Italiana, Ferrovienord
- Rolling stock: E.464, TAF, TSR
- Headway: up to 6 minutes in the central tracks; 30 minutes per direction per line (except for line S7, which runs mostly hourly)

Technical
- System length: 359 km (223 mi)
- Track gauge: 1,435 mm (4 ft 8 1/2 in) standard gauge
- Electrification: 3 kV DC from overhead catenary
System map

The Milan S Lines are a commuter rail system serving the metropolitan area of Milan, Italy. The system comprises 13 lines serving 124 stations, for a total length of 403 km. There are 415 daily trips by the trains with a ridership of about 230,000 per day.

The core of the system is the Passante, an underground railway running through the city approximately from the north-west to the south-east. Several lines share this track, making the service in the city centre comparable to a metro line or S-Bahn system.

The service timetable is based on a clock-face scheduling. Although operated by different companies, the Milan Metro and the suburban rail service have integrated tickets.

== Network ==
Lines in darker background run through the Milan Passante railway. Lines which share same tracks for the majority of the route are generally identified by similar colors. Trains run every 30 minutes in each line (except S7), generally from 5/6 am to 10 pm or half past midnight, depending on the line.

| Line | Terminals | Length | | Stations | Operator |
| Line | Terminals | km | mi | Stations | Operator |
|---|---|---|---|---|---|
| Line S1 | Saronno – Lodi | 55.4 | 34.4 | 25 | Trenord |
| Line S2 | Mariano Comense – Milano Rogoredo | 34.0 | 21.1 | 20 | Trenord |
| Line S3 | Saronno – Milano Cadorna | 23.6 | 14.7 | 13 | Trenord |
| Line S4 | Camnago-Lentate – Milano Cadorna | 21.2 | 13.2 | 13 | Trenord |
| Line S5 | Varese – Treviglio | 92.6 | 57.5 | 31 | ATI Trenord-ATM |
| Line S6 | Novara – Pioltello ( – Treviglio) | 83.5 | 51.9 | 25 | Trenord |
| Line S7 | Lecco – Milano Porta Garibaldi | 57 | 35 | 22 | Trenord |
| Line S8 | Lecco – Milano Porta Garibaldi | 49.9 | 31.0 | 13 | Trenord |
| Line S9 | Saronno – Albairate Vermezzo | 64.0 | 39.8 | 24 | Trenord |
| Line S11 | Como San Giovanni – Milano Porta Garibaldi – (Rho) | 51.4 | 31.9 | 18 | Trenord |
| Line S12 | Milano Bovisa – Melegnano | 22.4 | 13.9 | 15 | Trenord |
| Line S13 | Garbagnate Milanese – Pavia | 39.0 | 24.2 | 19 | Trenord |
| Line S19 | Milano Rogoredo – Albairate-Vermezzo | 24.2 | 15.0 | 10 | Trenord |

=== Defunct lines ===
| Line | Terminals | Length | | Stations | Operator | Reason for elimination |
| Line | Terminals | km | mi | Stations | Operator | Reason for elimination |
|---|---|---|---|---|---|---|
| Line S10 | Milano Rogoredo – Milano Bovisa | 24.0 | 14.9 | 8 | Trenord | Renamed line S13 to avoid confusion with line S10 of TILO; the line was also extended south to Pavia. |
| Line S14 | Milano Rogoredo – Rho | N/A | N/A | 11 | Trenord | Only active during Expo 2015; will be restored when the western extension to Magenta opens. |

=== Stations served ===
List of lines with stations served

S1: Saronno–Lodi

Saronno • Saronno Sud • Caronno Pertusella • Cesate • Garbagnate Milanese • Garbagnate Parco delle Groane • Bollate Nord • Bollate Centro • Novate Milanese • Milano Quarto Oggiaro • Milano Bovisa • Milano Lancetti • Milano Porta Garibaldi • Milano Repubblica • Milano Porta Venezia • Milano Dateo • Milano Porta Vittoria • Milano Rogoredo • San Donato Milanese • Borgolombardo • San Giuliano Milanese • Melegnano • San Zenone al Lambro • Tavazzano • Lodi

S2: Mariano Comense–Milano Rogoredo

Mariano Comense • Cabiate • Meda • Seveso • Cesano Maderno • Bovisio Masciago-Mombello • Varedo • Palazzolo Milanese • Paderno Dugnano • Cusano Milanino • Cormano-Brusuglio • Milano Bruzzano • Milano Affori • Milano Bovisa • Milano Lancetti • Milano Porta Garibaldi • Milano Repubblica • Milano Porta Venezia • Milano Dateo • Milano Porta Vittoria • Milano Rogoredo

S3: Saronno–Milano Cadorna

Saronno • Saronno Sud • Caronno Pertusella • Cesate • Garbagnate Milanese • Garbagnate Parco delle Groane • Bollate Nord • Bollate Centro • Novate Milanese • Milano Quarto Oggiaro • Milano Bovisa • Milano Domodossola • Milano Cadorna

S4: Camnago-Lentate–Milano Cadorna

Camnago-Lentate • Seveso • Cesano Maderno • Bovisio Masciago-Mombello • Varedo • Palazzolo Milanese • Paderno Dugnano • Cusano Milanino • Cormano-Brusuglio • Milano Bruzzano • Milano Affori • Milano Bovisa • Milano Domodossola • Milano Cadorna

S5: Varese–Treviglio

Varese • Gazzada-Schianno-Morazzone • Castronno • Albizzate-Solbiate Arno • Cavaria-Oggiona-Jerago • Gallarate • Busto Arsizio • Legnano • Canegrate • Parabiago • Vanzago-Pogliano • Rho • Rho Fiera • Milano Certosa • Milano Villapizzone • Milano Lancetti • Milano Porta Garibaldi • Milano Repubblica • Milano Porta Venezia • Milano Dateo • Milano Porta Vittoria • Milano Forlanini • Segrate • Pioltello-Limito • Vignate • Melzo • Pozzuolo Martesana • Trecella • Cassano d'Adda • Treviglio

S6: Novara–Treviglio

Novara • Trecate • Magenta • Corbetta-Santo Stefano Ticino • Vittuone-Arluno • Pregnana Milanese • Rho • Rho Fiera • Milano Certosa • Milano Villapizzone • Milano Lancetti • Milano Porta Garibaldi • Milano Repubblica • Milano Porta Venezia • Milano Dateo • Milano Porta Vittoria • Milano Forlanini • Segrate • Pioltello-Limito • Vignate • Melzo • Pozzuolo Martesana • Trecella • Cassano d'Adda • Treviglio

S7: Lecco–Molteno–Milano Porta Garibaldi

Lecco • Valmadrera • Civate • Sala al Barro-Galbiate • Oggiono • Molteno • Costa Masnaga • Cassago-Nibionno-Bulciago • Renate-Veduggio • Besana • Villa Raverio • Carate-Calò • Triuggio-Ponte Albiate • Macherio-Canonica • Biassono-Lesmo Parco • Buttafava • Villasanta Parco • Monza Sobborghi • Monza • Sesto San Giovanni • Milano Greco Pirelli • Milano Porta Garibaldi

S8: Lecco–Carnate–Milano Porta Garibaldi

Lecco • Lecco Maggianico • Calolziocorte-Olginate • Airuno • Olgiate-Calco-Brivio • Cernusco-Merate • Osnago • Carnate-Usmate • Arcore • Monza • Sesto San Giovanni • Milano Greco Pirelli • Milano Porta Garibaldi

S9: Saronno–Albairate-Vermezzo

Saronno • Saronno Sud • Ceriano Laghetto-Solaro • Ceriano Laghetto-Groane • Cesano Maderno-Groane • Cesano Maderno • Seveso-Baruccana • Seregno • Desio • Lissone-Muggiò • Monza • Sesto San Giovanni • Milano Greco Pirelli • Milano Lambrate • Milano Forlanini • Milano Porta Romana • Milano Tibaldi • Milano Romolo • Milano San Cristoforo • Corsico • Cesano Boscone • Trezzano sul Naviglio • Gaggiano • Albairate-Vermezzo

S11: Chiasso–Milano Porta Garibaldi

Chiasso • Como San Giovanni • Como Camerlata • Cucciago • Cantù-Cermenate • Carimate • Camnago-Lentate • Seregno • Desio • Lissone-Muggiò • Monza • Sesto San Giovanni • Milano Greco Pirelli • Milano Porta Garibaldi • Milano Villapizzone • Milano Certosa • Rho Fiera • Rho

S12: Cormano-Cusano Milanino–Melegnano

Cormano-Cusano Milanino • Milano Bruzzano • Milano Affori • Milano Bovisa • Milano Lancetti • Milano Porta Garibaldi • Milano Repubblica • Milano Porta Venezia • Milano Dateo • Milano Porta Vittoria • Milano Rogoredo • San Donato Milanese • Borgolombardo • San Giuliano Milanese • Melegnano

S13: Garbagnate Milanese–Pavia
Garbagnate Milanese • Garbagnate Parco delle Groane • Bollate Nord • Bollate Centro • Novate Milanese • Milano Quarto Oggiaro • Milano Bovisa • Milano Lancetti • Milano Porta Garibaldi • Milano Repubblica • Milano Porta Venezia • Milano Dateo • Milano Porta Vittoria • Milano Rogoredo • Locate Triulzi • Pieve Emanuele • Villamaggiore • Certosa di Pavia • Pavia

S19: Milano–Albairate-Vermezzo
Milano Rogoredo • Milano Scalo Romana • Milano Tibaldi • Milano Romolo • Milano San Cristoforo • Corsico • Cesano Boscone • Trezzano sul Naviglio • Gaggiano • Albairate-Vermezzo

== Integrated ticketing ==
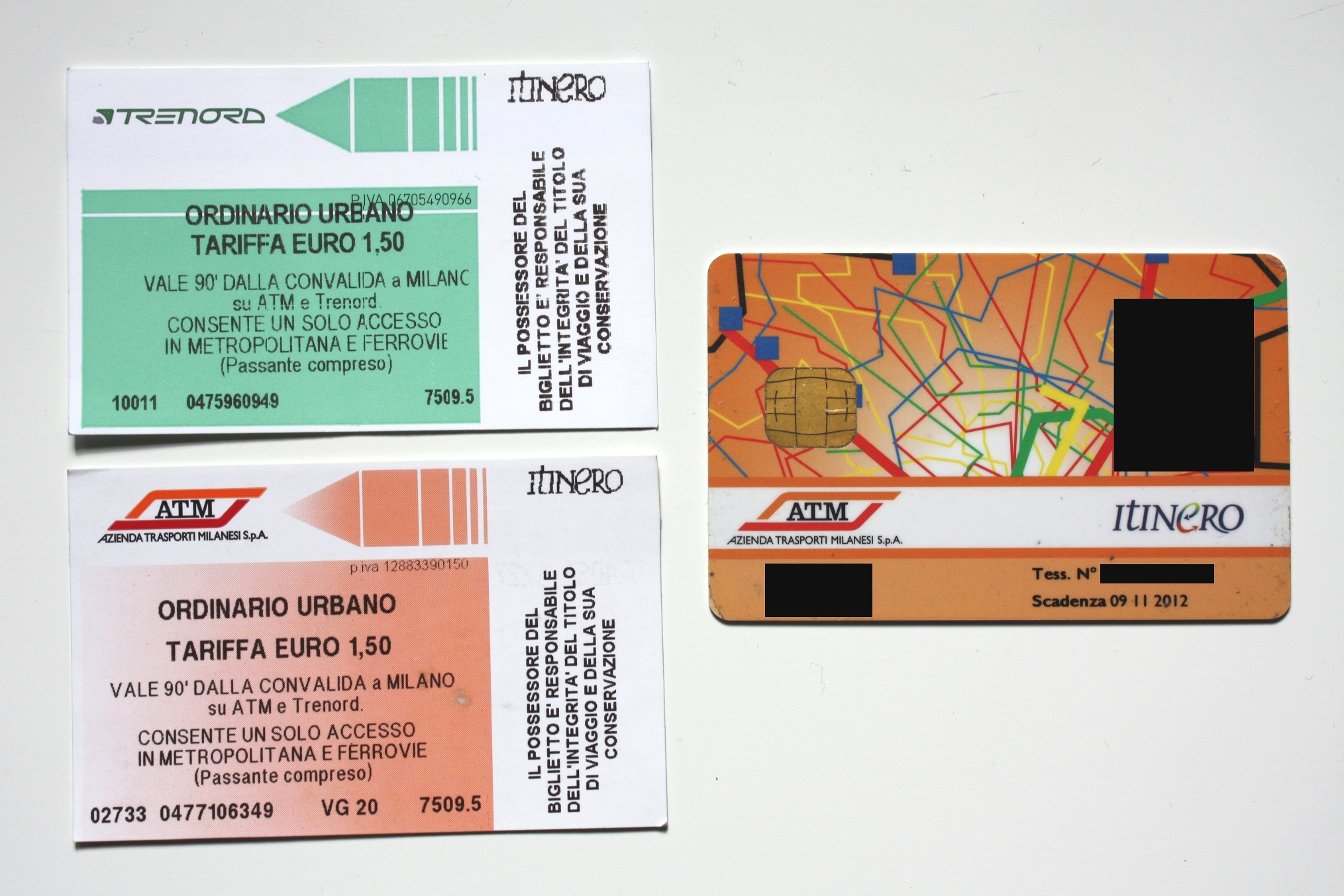
A Milan urban ticket from Trenord (up left) and the same ticket from ATM (bottom left). On the right, an Itinero smart card: the name on the bottom left, the photo and the card number on the right have been covered.

An integrated ticket is used inside the Milan urban area for bus, tram and metro lines, as well as the suburban railway. The urban single journey ticket costs €2.20. Other tickets are available, including 24h and 48h tickets and night ticket. Regional train fares apply outside the urban limit.

Between 2004 and 2007 ATM introduced Itinero smartcard, a proximity card which can be charged with season tickets, replacing paper for this type of tickets in the Milan area. At the beginning of 2010, a new smartcard, RicaricaMi, was introduced. The new card can be charged up with credit and can be used for travel in place of magnetic paper tickets, on the model of London's Oyster card. These cards are also valid on the suburban railway lines.

The suburban railways can be accessed also with the regional integrated ticket "Io viaggio ovunque in Lombardia", as 1 to 7 days tickets or more long subscription with smartcard "Io Viaggio".

Since 1 October 2019, in provinces that include only municipalities where new STIBM tariff system (introduced on 15 July 2019) pricing is active, IVOP titles have been abolished.

Since 9 January 2023 the standard Mi1-Mi3 ticked price has been raised from 2.00€ to 2.20€ (and consequently every other STIBM ticket).

== Rolling stock ==
Several train classes are operated on the network: Treno ad alta frequentazione (TAF) class trains, that were introduced since the end of the 1990s and are mostly unused as of 2024; Treno Servizio Regionale (TSR) class trains introduced since 2007 to replace older rolling stock; Caravaggio introduced since 2019 and mainly used on the S8 and S11 lines; ATR115 and ATR125 (based on the Stadler FLIRT platform) only used on the S7 line; and the E.464 locomotive with "Carrozza vicinale a piano ribassato" used on the S9 and S8.

== History ==
Full service started on 12 December 2004 with the completion of the Passante and the activation of the first 8 lines. However, a shuttle service was running since 1997 in the partially completed track.

Line S4 was extended from Seveso to Camnago on 19 February 2006. The new Romolo station on line S9 was opened 3 months later. Lines S1, S2, S6 and S10 were extended from Porta Vittoria to the new station of Rogoredo on 15 June 2008.

Two new stations, Pregnana Milanese and Rho Fiera Milano were opened in 2009. Line S8 and S11 began operation at the end of the same year, while the service was extended to reach Lodi and Treviglio.

On 26 March 2011, with the completion of the Milan Metro Line 3 north extension, a new station, Affori, was opened in place of the old one, to be an interchange with the Metro. On 1 May 2011 a new company, Trenord, was created from the joining of the two main regional train operators in Lombardy, Trenitalia and LeNord. Trenord is since then the operator of most of suburban lines.

Between 2011 and 2015 (pre EXPO upgrades to the service) the line S9 has been prolonged to Albairate-Vermezzo to the south and to Saronno to the north with the consequent opening of 6 new stations, S10 was prolonged to Pavia and renamed S13 and the Pieve Emanuele station was opened and served from the start by the S13; many services were upgraded to 30min frequencies, Milano Bruzzano Parco Nord station was opened in substitution of the previous station of Milano Bruzzano and the new S7 line to Lecco via the secondary Monza - Molteno railway was created.

For the 2015 EXPO exposition, line S11 was prolonged to Rho (thus serving the renamed Rho Fiera EXPO Milano 2015 station), 2 more stations were activated even though not related to the event, a new S14 line was temporarily activated between Rho and Milano Rogoredo stations, then shut down at the end of the exposition.

In the following the EXPO event (that brought international attention to the city) a new S12 (Cormano-Cusano Milanino - Melegnano) was created to help with overcrowding during rush hours (with 8 runs a day) and 2 stations were suppressed (even though every diagram says they're temporarily closed).

Due to the COVID-19 pandemic many serviced had their frequencies reduced and, for a while S3 had no runs between 9 a.m. and 10 p.m. and S2 and S12 were shut down. With time everything got back to normal except S12 which was reactivated only at the end of August 2023 and same goes for the half an hour frequency for the S9 line. In 2022 the new station Milano Tibaldi, near Bocconi University was activated as a first station for a circle line project.

In December 2024, line S12 was limited again from Cormano-Cusano to Milano Bovisa station, but was also upgraded to run at the standard frequency of two trains per hour per direction (even though on weekdays daytimeonly, similarly to S2), thus increasing service between Milan and Melegnano to every 15 minutes from 6 a.m in the morning to 9 p.m. in the evening.

== Planned extensions ==
- line S2: extension from Milano Rogoredo to Pieve Emanuele.
- line S8: extension from Milano Porta Garibaldi to Milano Bovisa.
- line S9: extension from Saronno to Busto Arsizio in the north, shortening the route in the south from Albairate-Vermezzo to Milano San Cristoforo, where it would be substituted with S16.

At least five new lines are expected to enter service in the next few years, with some of them needing to wait for the completion of new infrastructural projects in order to be activated, such as the quad-tracking of the currently double-tracked Rho-Parabiago section on the Milan-Gallarate railway:

- line S14: Magenta – Milano Rogoredo.
- line S15: Parabiago – Milano Rogoredo.
- line S16: Abbiategrasso – Lambrate – Rho.
- line S17: Garbagnate – Garbagnate Ovest – Lainate.
- line S18: Milano Bovisa – Milano Porta Garibaldi – Carnate Usmate – Orio al Serio.

Several new stations are also planned to be built to better serve the Milan urban area, as detailed by the Plan for Sustainable Urban transportation (or PUMS in Italian) for the municipality of Milan. Some of them are:

- Milano Canottieri
- Milano Dergano
- Milano Istria
- Milano Zama
- Milano Puglie

== Gallery ==
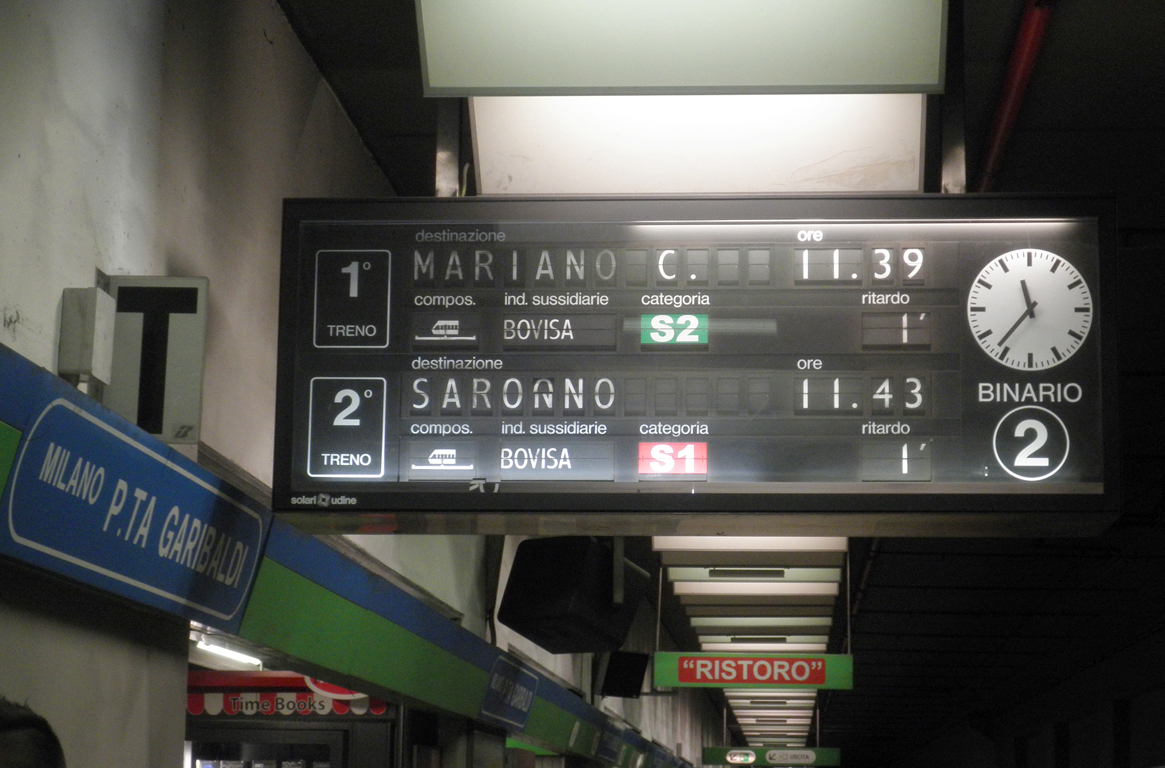
Split-flap display in use at Milano Porta Garibaldi railway station

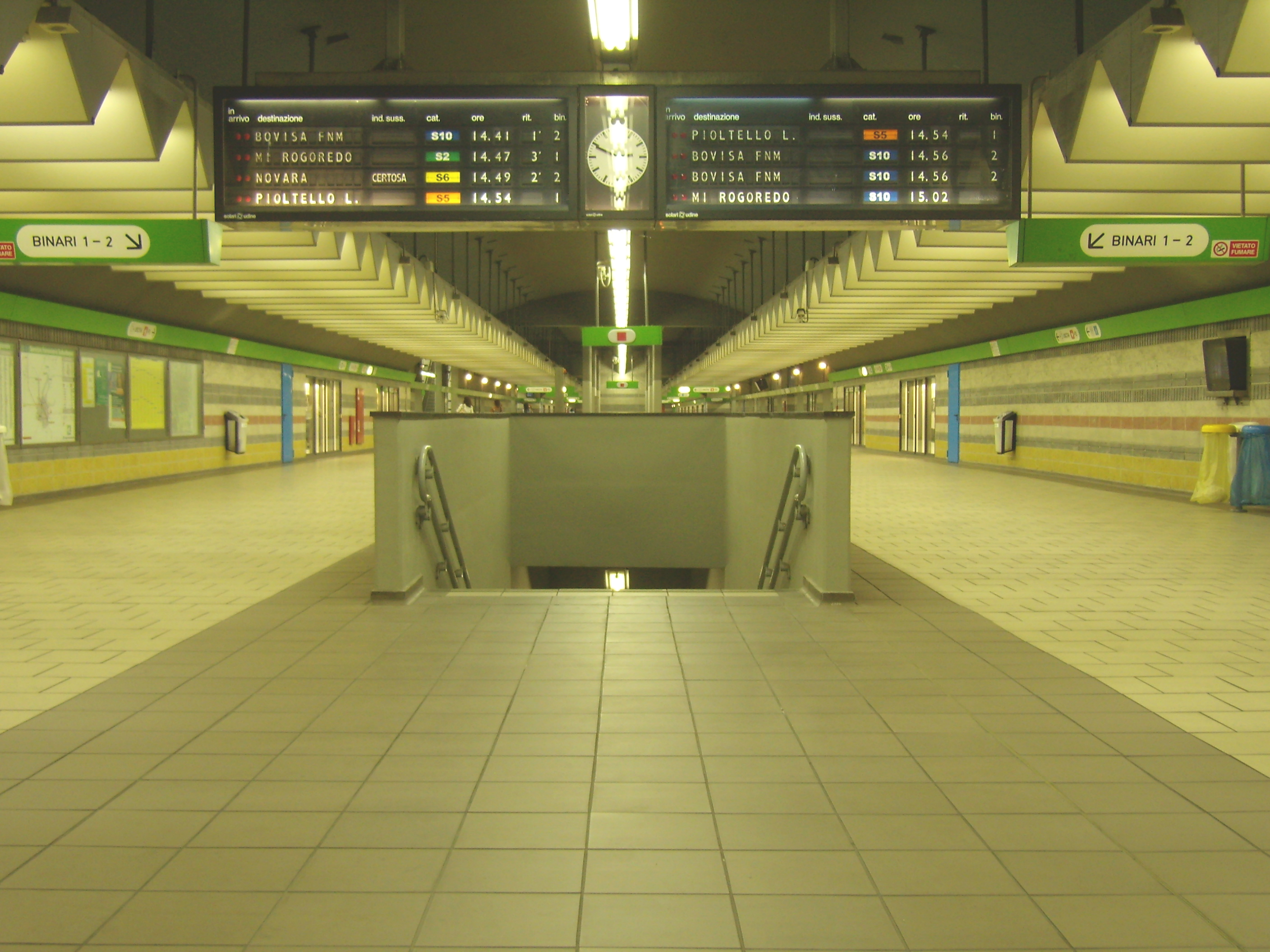
Milano Porta Garibaldi railway station, mezzanine level

Map of the system

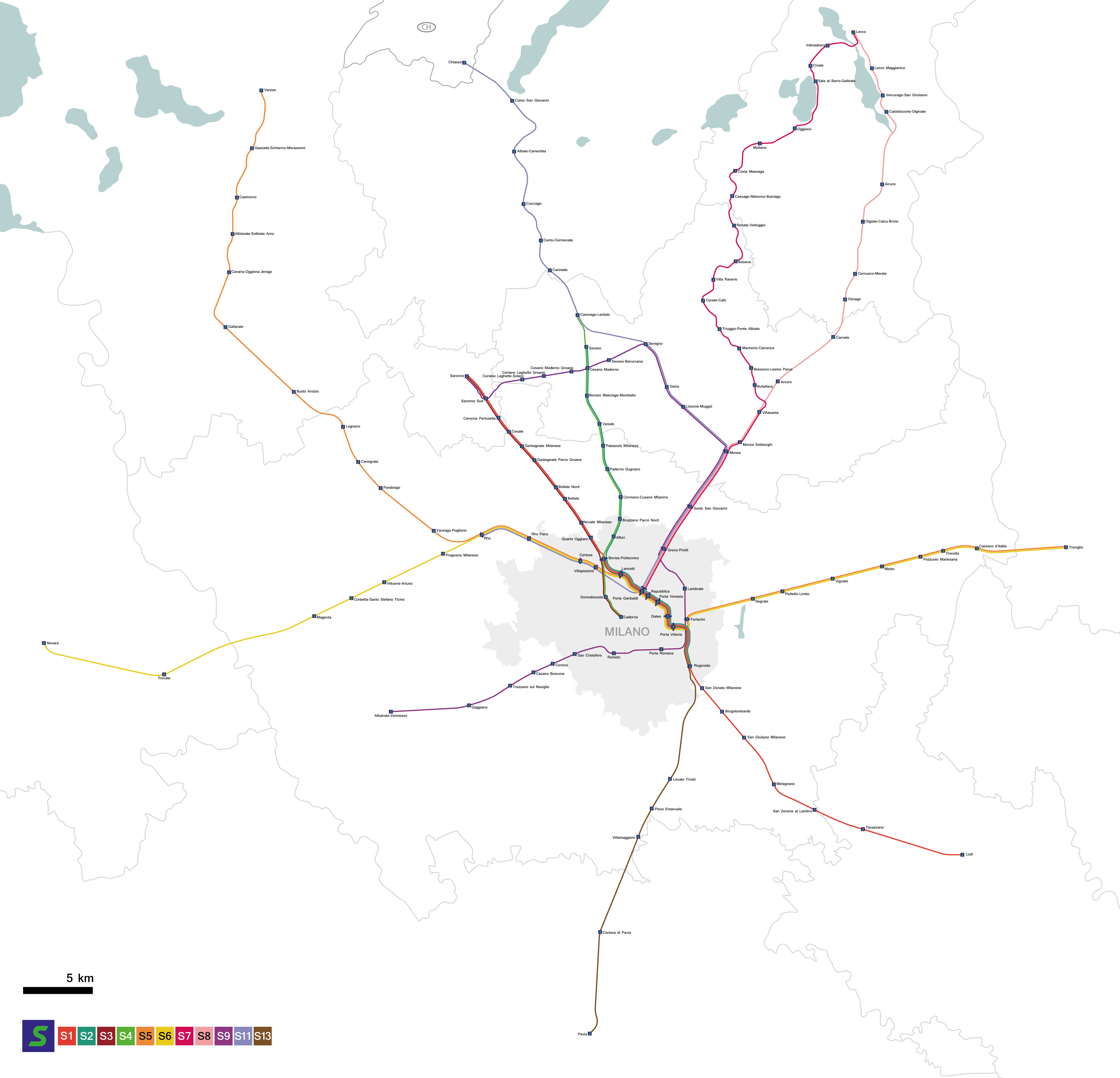
Geographic map of the system

== See also ==
- Transport in Milan
- List of Milan S Lines stations
