= Castronno railway station =

Railway station in Lombardy, Italy

Castronno
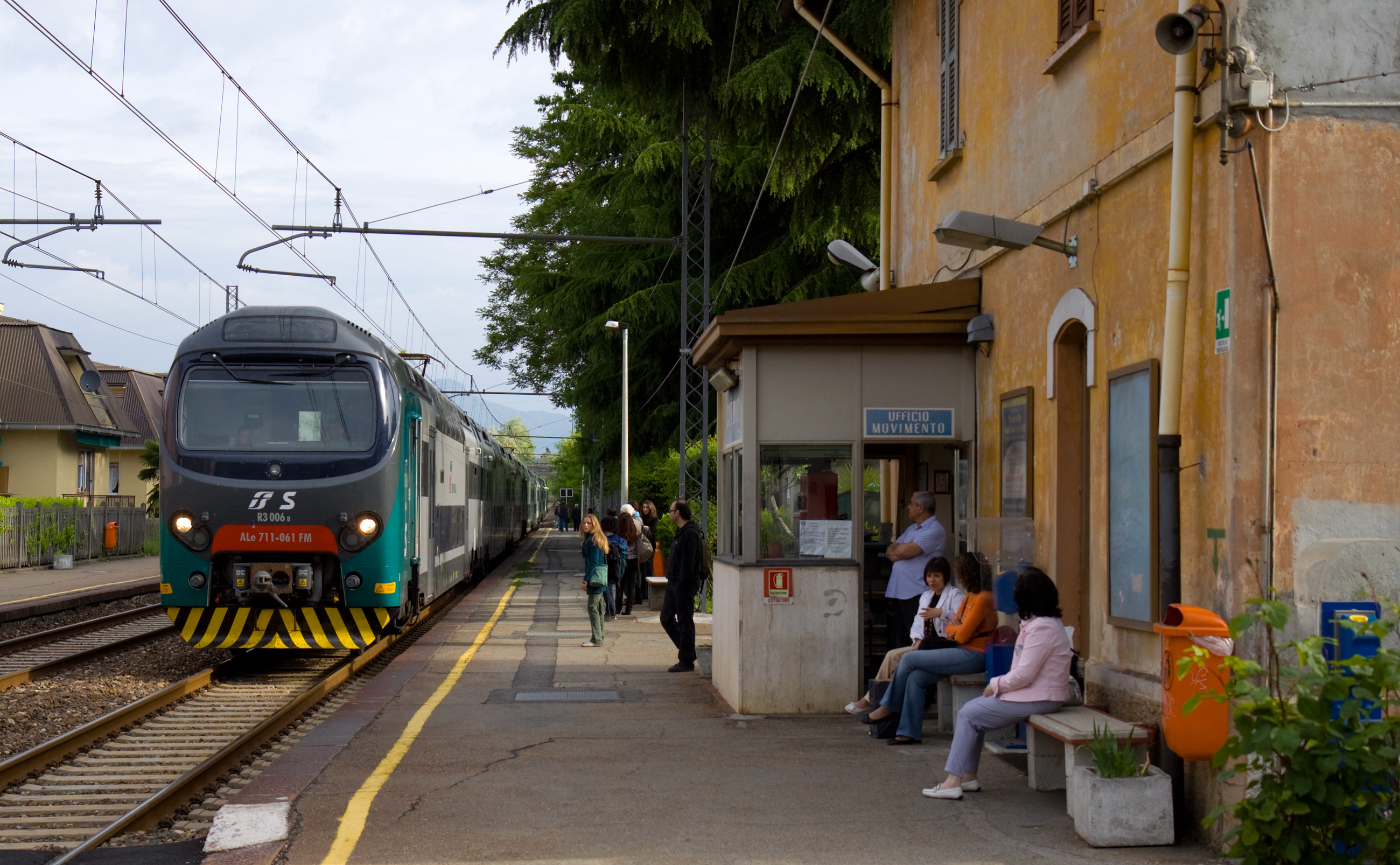

General information
- Location: Via della Stazione; Castronno, Varese, Lombardy; Italy
- Coordinates: 45°44′43″N 08°48′38″E
- Operator: Rete Ferroviaria Italiana
- Line: Porto Ceresio–Milan
- Distance: 10.027 km (6.230 mi) from Gallarate
- Train operators: Trenord

Other information
- Classification: silver

Services
Preceding station	Trenord	Following station
Gazzada Schianno–Morazzone towards Varese	Line S5 (Milan suburban railway service)	Albizzate–Solbiate Arno towards Treviglio
Location
- Location within Lombardy Location within Northern Italy Location within Italy

Castronno railway station is a railway station in Italy. Located on the Porto Ceresio–Milan railway, it serves the municipality of Castronno.

== Services ==
The station is served by the line S5 of Milan suburban railway network, operated by the lombard railway company Trenord.

== See also ==
- Milan suburban railway network
