= Caronno Pertusella =

- Comune
- Comune di Caronno Pertusella
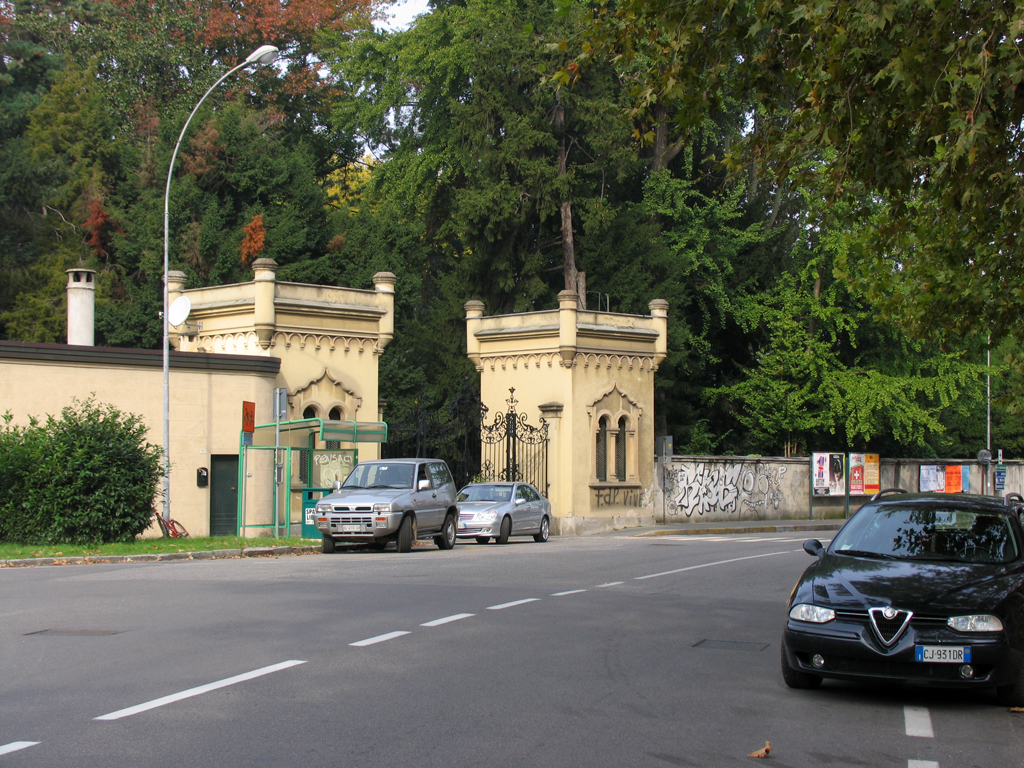

- Location within Italy Location within Lombardy
- Coordinates: 45°36′N 09°3′E
- Country: Italy
- Region: Lombardy
- Province: Varese (VA)
- Frazioni: Bariola

Government
  - Mayor: Marco Giudici

Area
  - Total: 8.40 km^{2} (3.24 sq mi)

Population (31 december 2017)
  - Total: 17,775
  - Density: 2,120/km^{2} (5,480/sq mi)
- Demonym(s): Caronnesi and Perseghini
- Time zone: UTC+1 (CET)
  - Summer (DST): UTC+2 (CEST)
- Postal code: 21042
- Dialing code: 02
- Patron saint: Sts. Margaret and Alexander
- Website: Official website

Caronno Pertusella (Lombard: Caronn e Pertusella [kaˈrɔn e pertyˈzɛla]) is a town and comune located in the province of Varese, in the Lombardy region of northern Italy. It has a population of about 17,775.

Caronno Pertusella has a train station, which has Milan's suburban railway lines S1 and S3 connecting to Saronno, Milano Cadorna, Lodi, and Milan's main line stations.

Cardinal Giovanni Colombo, the Archbishop of Milan in the mid-20th century, and one-time Papabile, was born in Caronno Pertusella.

== See also ==
- S.C. Caronnese S.S.D.
- Caronno Pertusella railway station
- Carrozzeria Marazzi
- Gruppo Riva
