= Garbagnate Milanese =

Garbagnate Milanese Garbagnaa (Lombard)
- Comune
- Città di Garbagnate Milanese
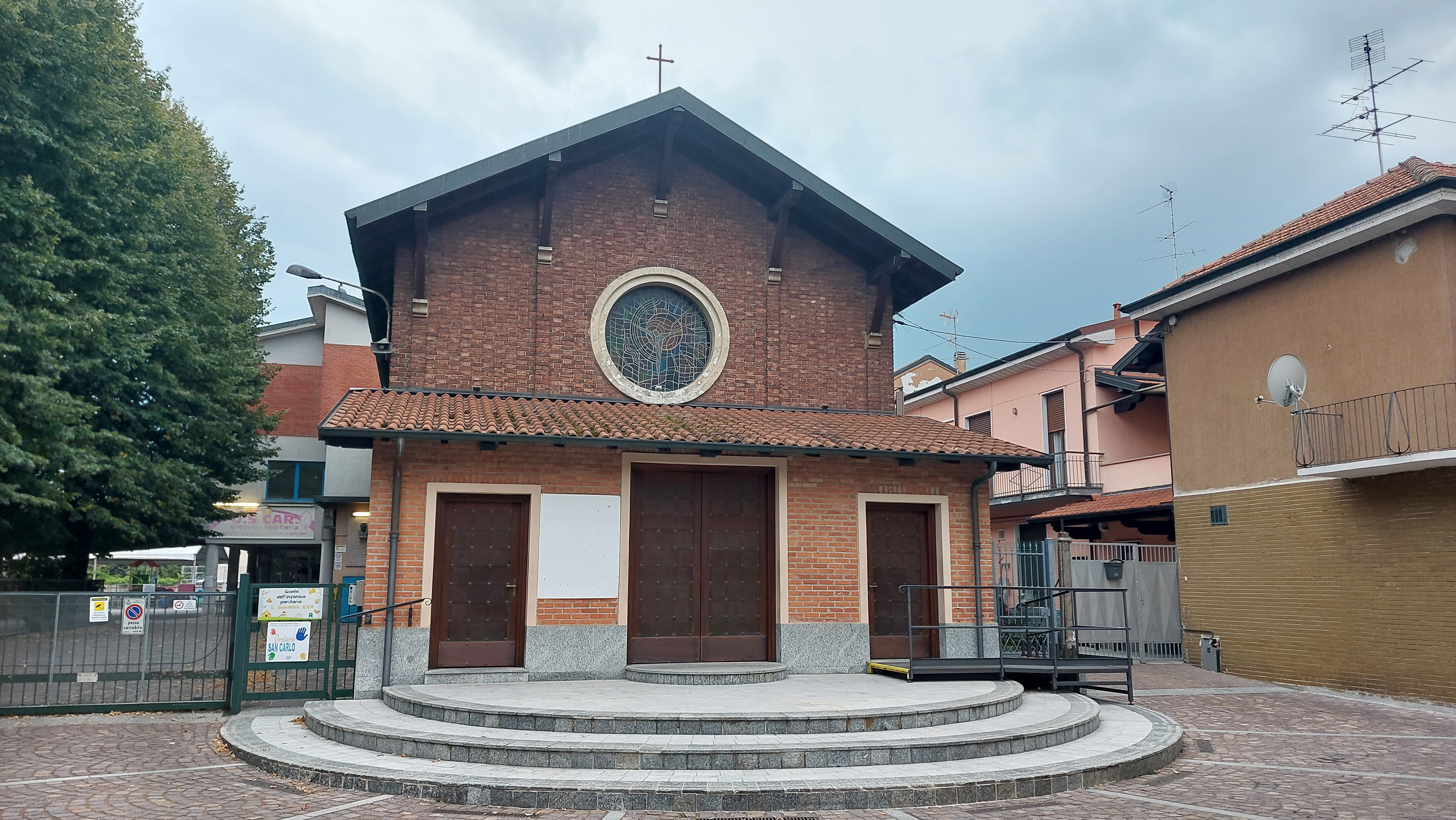
- Church of San Giuseppe Artigiano

- Coat of arms

- Location within Italy Location within Lombardy
- Coordinates: 45°35′N 9°4′E
- Country: Italy
- Region: Lombardy
- Metropolitan city: Milan (MI)
- Frazioni: Bariana, Santa Maria Rossa

Government
  - Mayor: Daniele Davide Barletta (LN)

Area
  - Total: 8.9 km^{2} (3.4 sq mi)
- Elevation: 179 m (587 ft)

Population (31 December 2016)
  - Total: 27,226
  - Density: 3,100/km^{2} (7,900/sq mi)
- Demonym: Garbagnatesi
- Time zone: UTC+1 (CET)
  - Summer (DST): UTC+2 (CEST)
- Postal code: 20024
- Dialing code: 02
- Website: Official website

Garbagnate Milanese (Lombard: Garbagnaa [ɡarbaˈɲaː]) is a comune (municipality) in the Metropolitan City of Milan in the Italian region Lombardy, located about 15 kilometres (9 mi) northwest of Milan.

As of 30 November 2017, it had a population of 27.185.

Garbagnate Milanese borders the following municipalities: Caronno Pertusella, Cesate, Lainate, Senago, Arese, Bollate, Baranzate.

Garbagnate received the honorary title of city with a presidential decree on February 25, 1985.
