= Milan–Saronno railway =

Railway line in Italy

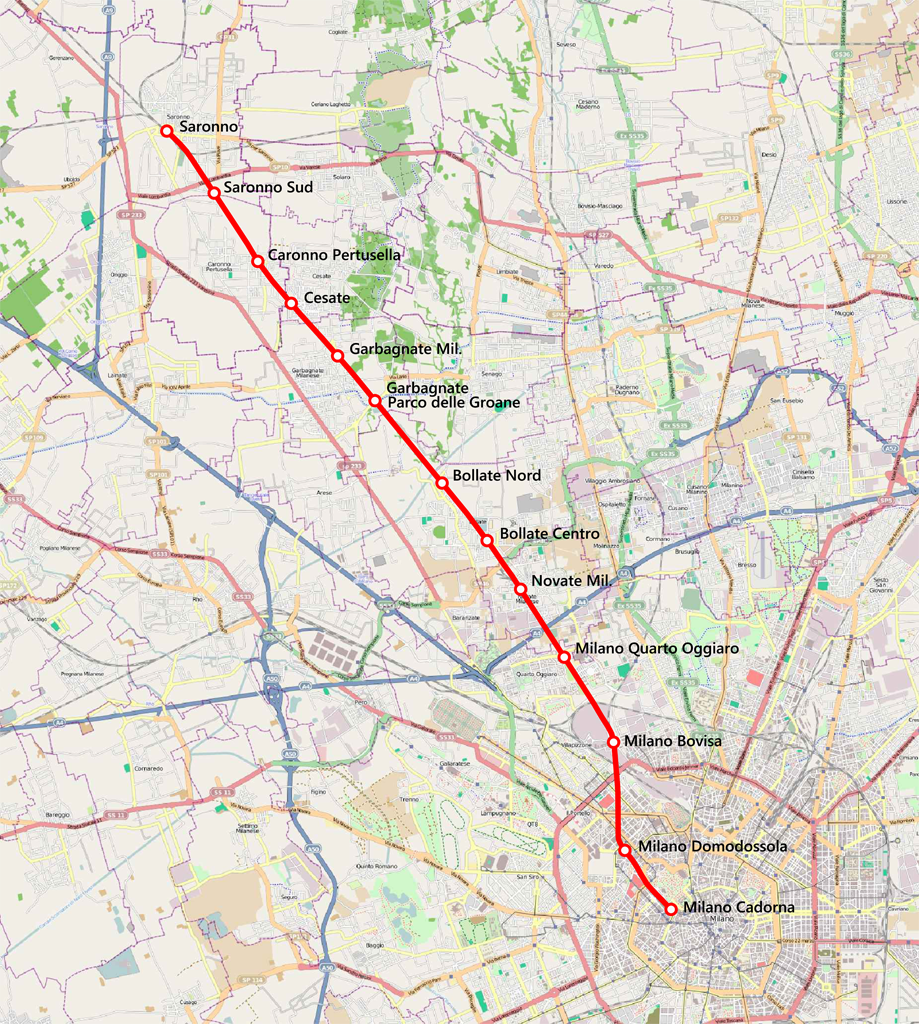
- map

Overview
- Native name: Ferrovia Milano-Saronno
- Termini: Milano Cadorna railway station; Saronno railway station
- Stations: 13

Service
- Type: heavy rail
- Services: S1, S3, R17, R22, R27, R28, RE1, RE7, MXP
- Operator: Trenord

History
- Opened: 1879

Technical
- Line length: 21.157 km (13.146 mi)
- Number of tracks: 4
- Track gauge: 1,435 mm (4 ft 8 1/2 in)
- Electrification: 3 kV DC, overhead line
- Operating speed: 140 km/h (87 mph)
- Highest elevation: 211 m (692 ft)

Milan–Saronno railway is a railway line in Lombardy, Italy.

== History ==
The line was opened by the FMSME (later: Ferrovie Nord Milano) on 25 March 1879.

The line was completely revamped during the 90's of the 20th century, building four tracks and new metro-type stations.

The line is fully integrated in the Milan suburban railway network, with two standard services with Central Milan and the Milan passerby railway, while regional services with Novara, Malpensa, Varese and Como run directly between Milan and Saronno.

== See also ==
- List of railway lines in Italy
- Milan–Saronno–Tradate Tramway
- Milan–Gallarate Tramway
- Milan–Monza tramway
- Milan–Saronno–Tradate Tramway
- Milan–Vimercate Tramway
