= Saronno railway station =

Railway station in Italy

Saronno
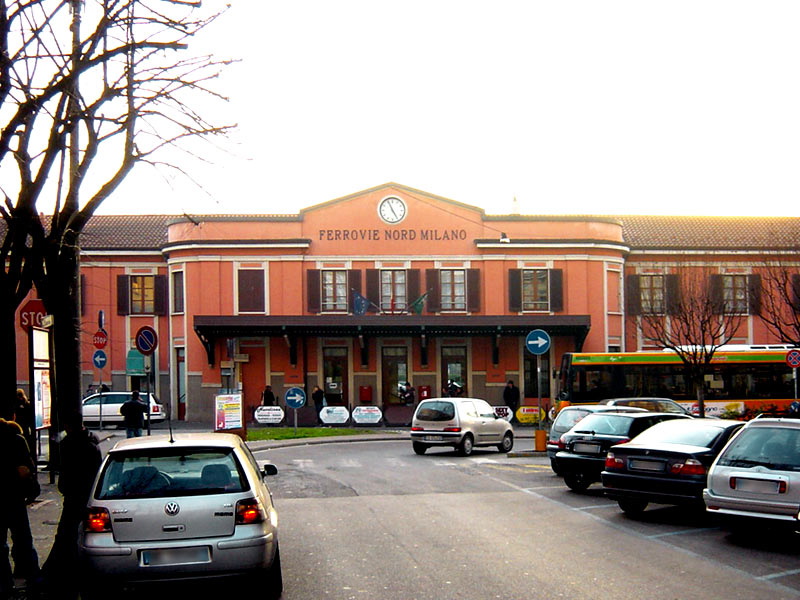
- The station entrance in 2007

General information
- Location: Piazza Luigi Cadorna, 8 Saronno; Italy
- Coordinates: 45°37′31″N 9°01′51″E
- Owner: Ferrovienord
- Lines: Milan–Saronno line; Saronno–Como line; Saronno–Laveno line; Saronno–Novara line; Saronno–Seregno line
- Distance: 21.157 km (13.146 mi) from Milano Cadorna
- Platforms: 8
- Train operators: Trenord

History
- Opened: 25 March 1879
- Electrified: May 1929

Services
Preceding station	Trenord	Following station
Terminus	Line S1 (Milan suburban railway service)	Saronno Sud towards Lodi
Terminus	Line S3 (Milan suburban railway service)	Saronno Sud towards Milano Cadorna
Terminus	Line S9 (Milan suburban railway service)	Saronno Sud towards Albairate–Vermezzo
Location
- Location within Lombardy Location within Northern Italy Location within Italy

Saronno railway station is a railway station in Italy. It serves the town of Saronno.

== Services ==
Saronno is terminus of the lines S1, S3 and S9 of the Milan suburban railway network, and served as well by the regional trains from Milan to Como, Laveno and Novara, and by the Malpensa Express. All this trains are operated by the Lombard railway company Trenord.

== See also ==
- Milan suburban railway network
