= Lodi railway station (Lombardy) =

Railway station in Italy

Lodi
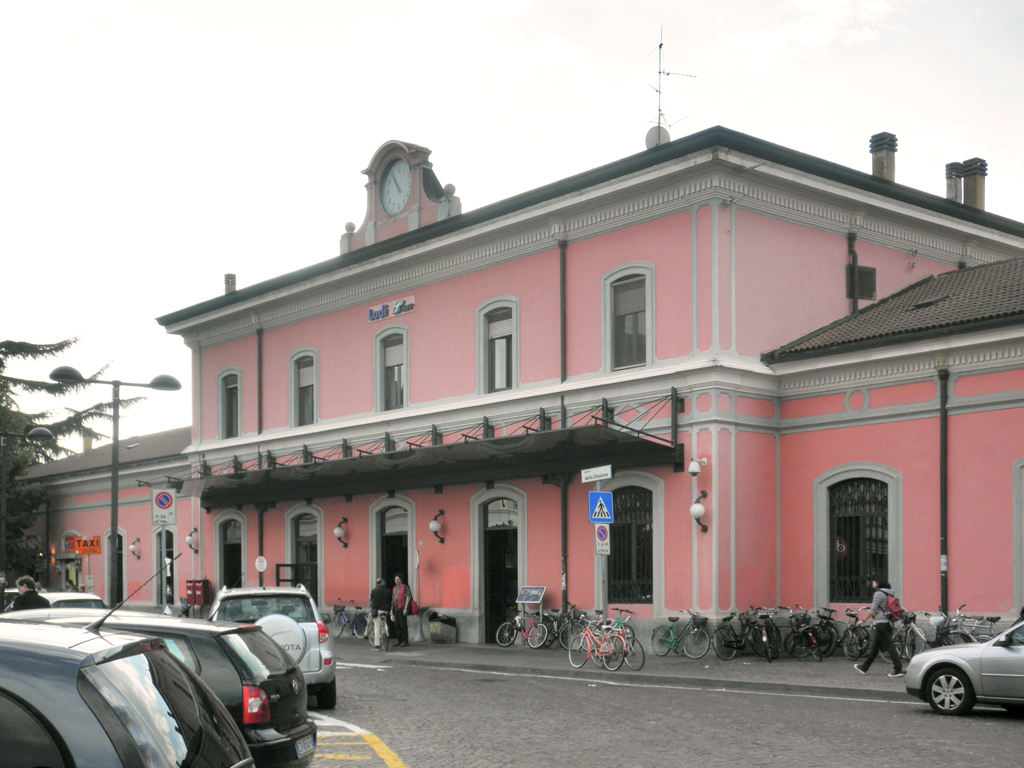
- View of the passenger building.

General information
- Location: Piazzale della Stazione; Lodi, Lodi, Lombardy; Italy
- Coordinates: 45°18′33″N 09°29′52″E
- Operator: Rete Ferroviaria Italiana; Centostazioni
- Line: Milano–Bologna
- Distance: 182.685 km (113.515 mi) from Bologna Centrale
- Platforms: 3
- Tracks: 5
- Train operators: Trenitalia; Trenord
- Connections: Urban and suburban buses

Other information
- Classification: Gold

History
- Opened: 14 November 1861; 164 years ago
- Electrified: 1938

Services
Preceding station	Trenord	Following station
Tavazzano towards Saronno	Line S1 (Milan suburban railway service)	Terminus
Location
- Location within Northern Italy

Lodi railway station (Italian: Stazione di Lodi) serves the city and comune of Lodi, in the region of Lombardy, northern Italy. Launched 1861, it lies along the Milan–Bologna railway.

The station is currently managed by Rete Ferroviaria Italiana (RFI). However, the commercial area of the passenger building is managed by Centostazioni. Train services are operated by Trenitalia, Trenitalia TPER (Emilia Romagna) and Trenord. Each of these companies is a subsidiary of Ferrovie dello Stato (FS), Italy's state-owned rail company.

== Location ==
Lodi railway station is located in Piazzale della Stazione, at the southern edge of the town centre.

== History ==
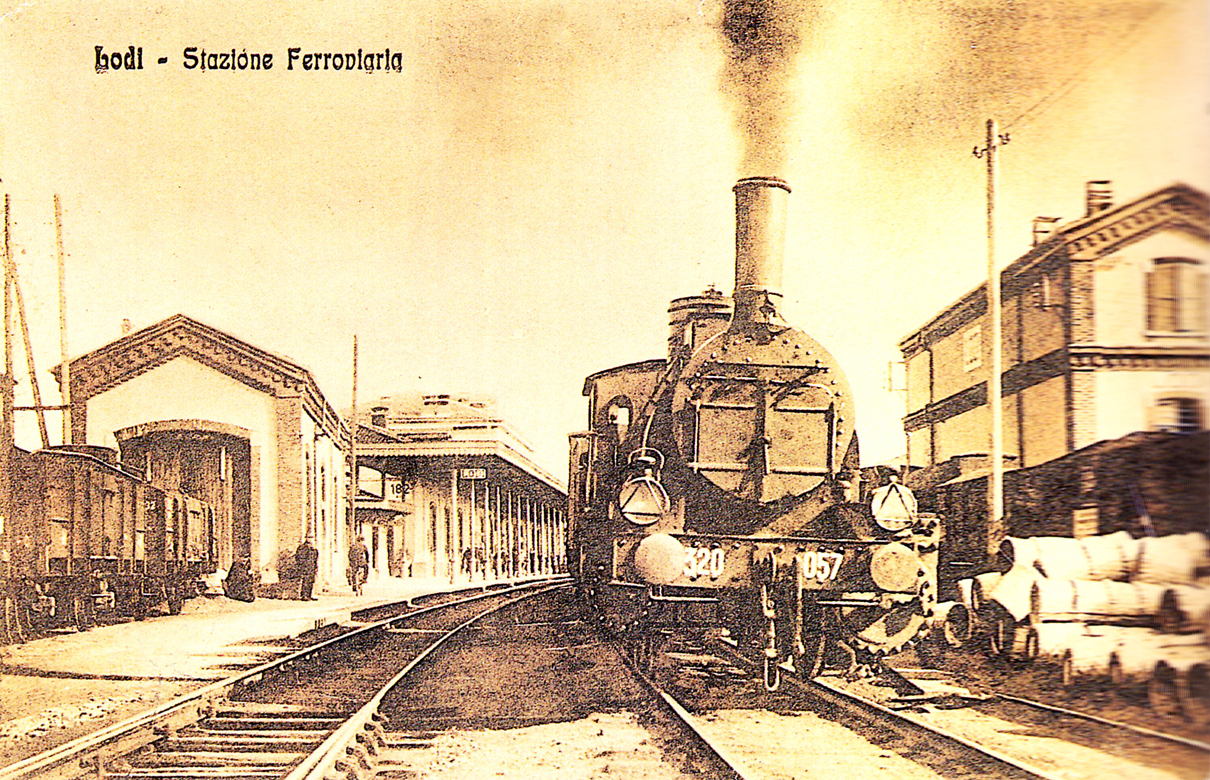
The station at the turn of the twentieth century.

The station was opened November 14, 1861, right after the Milan–Piacenza section of the Milan–Bologna railway was launched. It has undergone many changes after that.

In the stations heyday, its goods yard was connected with a silk spinning mill a short distance away. This piece of rail connection was closed when the mill shut down.

When further tracks were added, those destined to commuter traffic were increased to four. Around 2004, a fifth track was converted to passenger use. It was previously used mainly for overtaking goods trains on tracks 2 and 3.

In the same period, the goods yard section facing Piazzale della Stazione was converted into a parking lot and into the terminal of coach lines run by LINE. The warehouse adjacent to Platform 1 suffered a similar fate. It was closed, and the area is now used as the LINE ticket office.

== Features ==
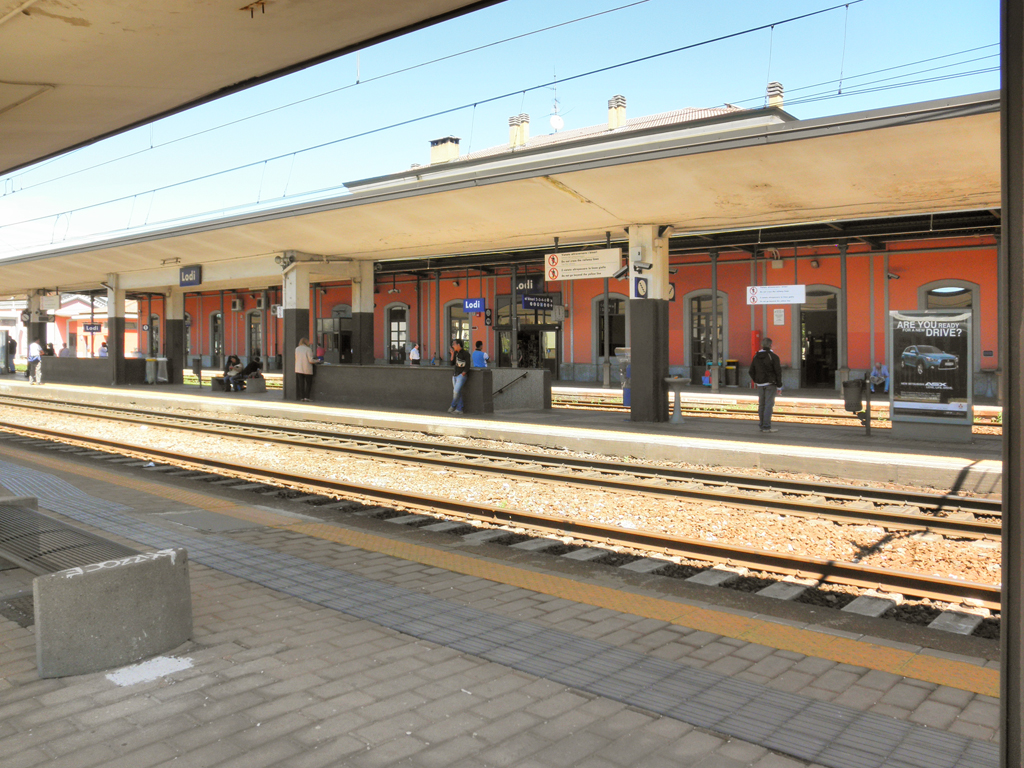
View of the station yard.

The passenger building is connected with all tracks (except the first, which is adjacent to it) by a pedestrian underpass. The platforms are equipped with shelters.

The underpass was necessary because the Milan–Bologna railway is one of the busiest in Italy, and was particularly busy before the opening of the Milan–Bologna high-speed railway.

The station yard has five tracks for passenger service, and a number of other tracks for the overtaking of goods trains waiting in the goods yard at the Bologna end of the station. Even tracks 1 and 4 are used for the overtaking of goods trains.

Near the side street Via Spelta is an operating goods yard, where loads of milk are marshalled before leaving the station by rail.

== Passenger and train movements ==
Lodi railway station has about four million passenger movements each year. Most of these movements are commuter trips to and from Milan.

Lodi is a stop for most regional trains on the long distance Milan–Bologna and the Milan–Cremona–Mantua railways heading directly to Bologna Centrale, Parma, Mantua, Cremona; there are also regional train links with Livorno Centrale and Rimini. Shorter distance regional trains operate to and from Piacenza; these trains stop at all stations between Piacenza and Lodi, and then operate non stop to Milan. Other regional services heading towards Milan stop at Milano Rogoredo, Milano Porta Garibaldi, Milano Lambrate, Milano Centrale, Milano Greco Pirelli, Milano Certosa and Sesto San Giovanni.

Also calling at Lodi are EuroStar City, InterCity, InterCityNight and express trains, on direct services to and from Napoli Centrale, Reggio Calabria Centrale, Crotone, Salerno, Bari Centrale, Terni, Rimini, Lecce and Milano Centrale.

In addition to these connections, Lodi is now a terminus of line S1 of the Milan suburban railway service, which connects Lodi with Saronno via the loop through Milan.

== Interchange ==
The station provides interchange with urban and suburban buses, and taxis.

== See also ==
- History of rail transport in Italy
- List of railway stations in Lombardy
- Rail transport in Italy
- Railway stations in Italy
