= Milano Cadorna railway station =

Railway station in Milan, Italy

Milano Cadorna
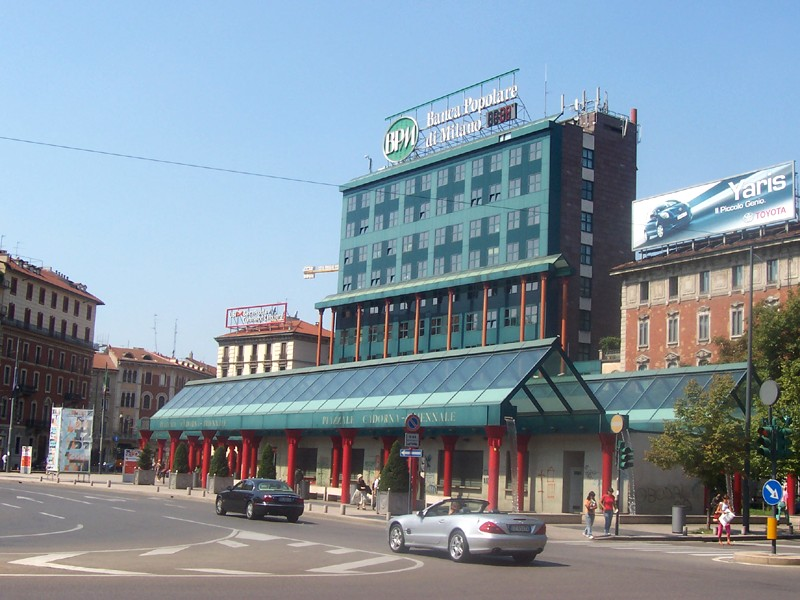

General information
- Location: Piazzale Cadorna 14, Milan; Italy
- Operator: Trenord
- Lines: Milan–Asso; Milan–Saronno
- Platforms: 10
- Connections: Cadorna MM

Other information
- Fare zone: STIBM: Mi1

History
- Opened: 25 March 1879
- Electrified: May 1929
- Former names: Milano Nord

Services
Preceding station	Trenord	Following station
Milano Domodossola towards Saronno	Line S3 (Milan suburban railway service)	Terminus
Milano Domodossola towards Camnago–Lentate	Line S4 (Milan suburban railway service)	Terminus
Location
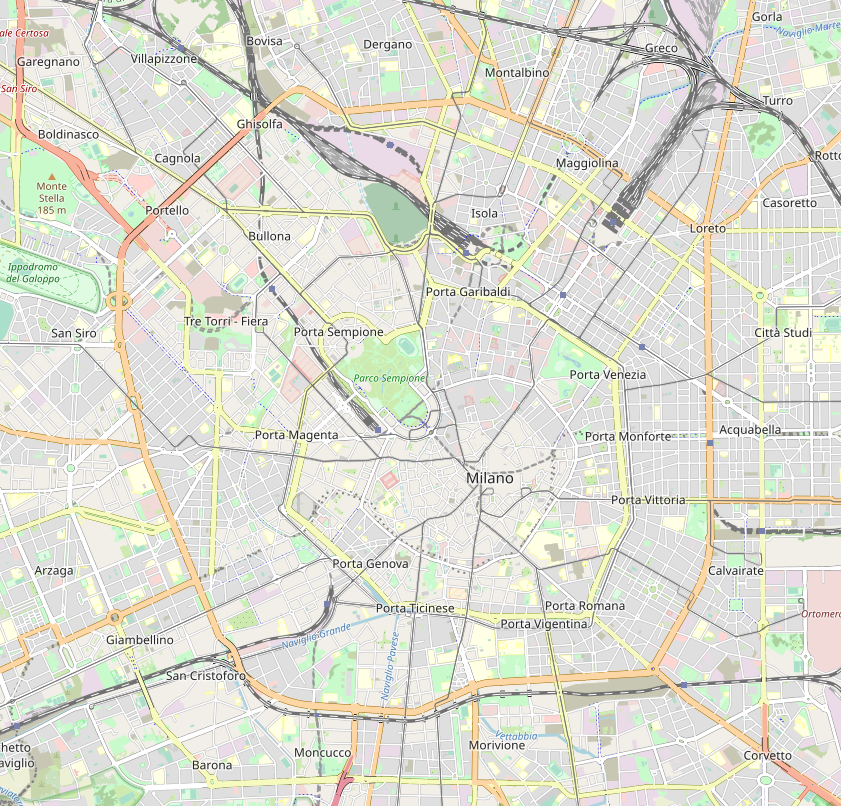
- Location within Milan Location within Lombardy Location within Northern Italy Location within Italy

Milano Cadorna is a commuter railway station located near the Castello Sforzesco in Milan, Italy.

== History ==
The original station, built in wood in the style of a chalet, was opened in 1879. This was enlarged in 1920, but the station was destroyed during the bombing raids of the city in the Second World War. The current structure and the homonymous square were completely restored in 1999 under a Gae Aulenti project.

The station is named after the World War I Italian Army General Luigi Cadorna.

== Transport ==
Passenger services from this station, by commuter, suburban, regional and express trains, are operated by Trenord.

=== Local public transportation ===
Piazzale Cadorna (Cadorna square, in front of the station) is a hub of Milan's public transport: it features Cadorna junction underground station (underground lines M1 and M2) and stops or headlines for one tramway line (1) and eight bus lines (NM1, NM2, N25, N26, 50, 85, 96 and 97).

== Gallery ==
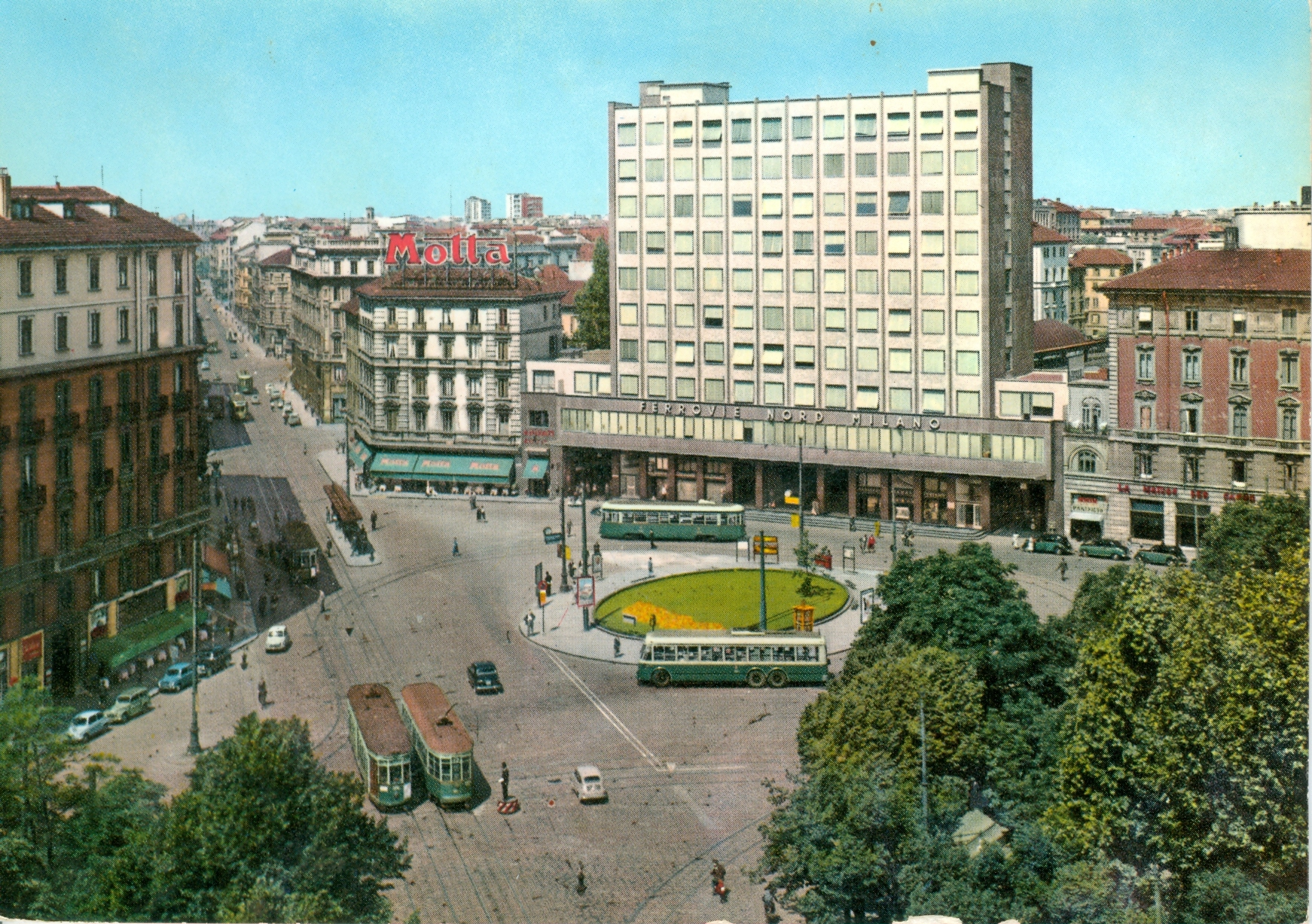
Cadorna station in the 1960s before the restoration

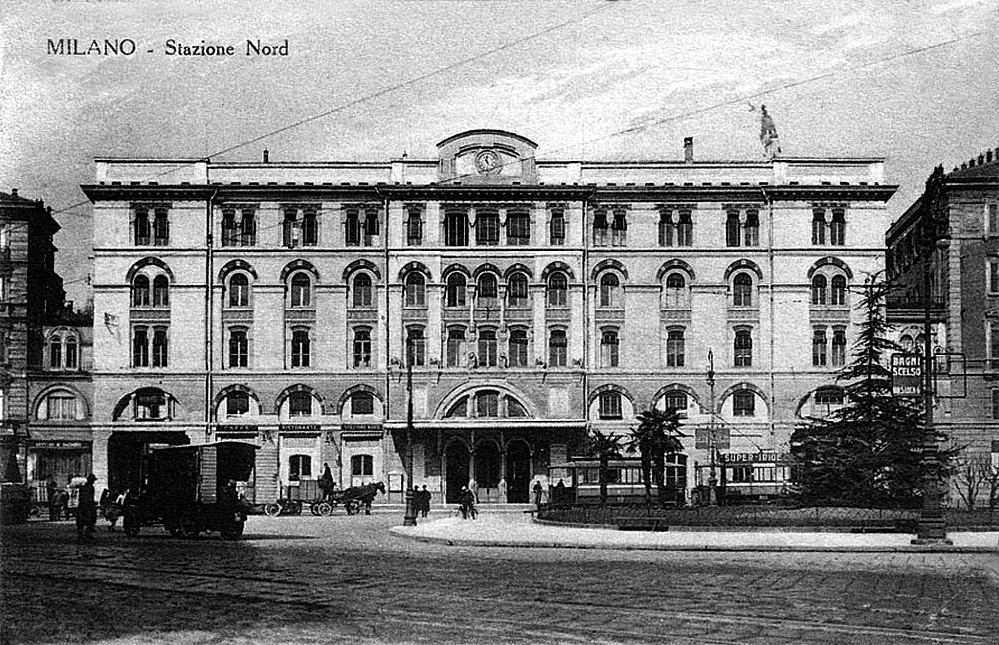
The old station from 1920 before its destruction in 1943 during World War II
