= Calolziocorte railway station =

Railway station in Lombardy, Italy

Calolziocorte
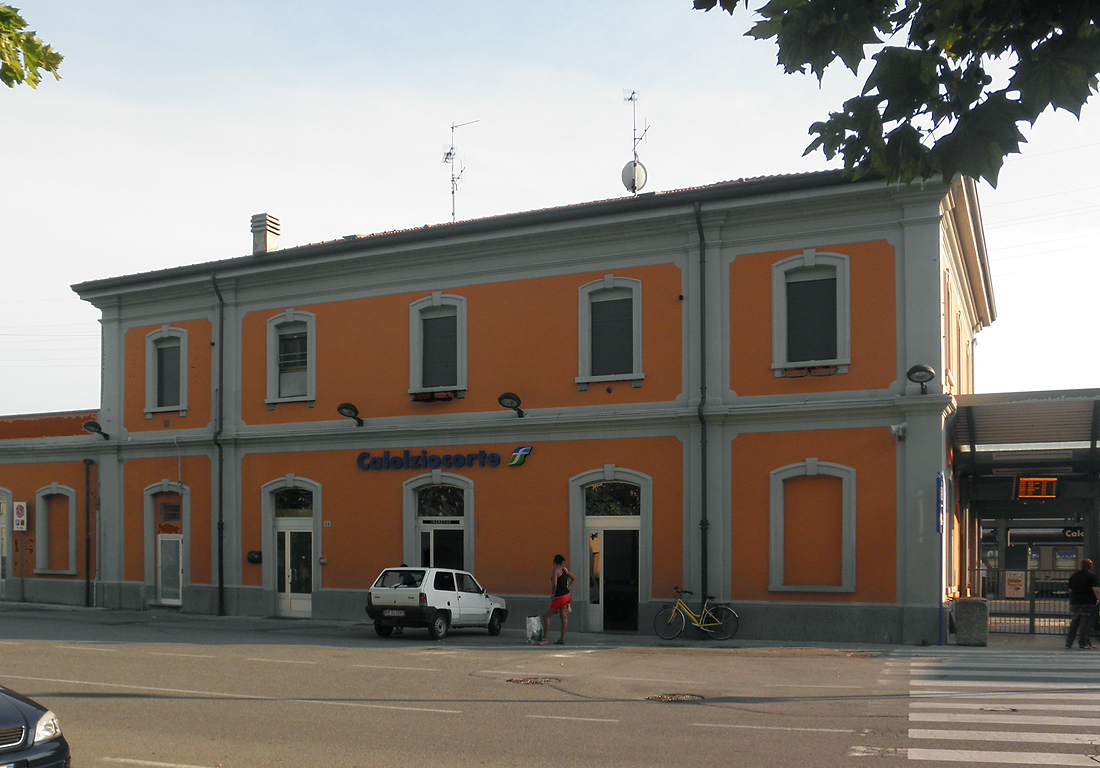

General information
- Location: Via Galli; Calolziocorte, Lecco, Lombardy; Italy
- Coordinates: 45°48′06″N 09°25′38″E
- Operator: Rete Ferroviaria Italiana
- Lines: Lecco–Bergamo; Lecco–Milan
- Distance: 26.046 km (16.184 mi) from Bergamo; 30.404 km (18.892 mi) from Monza
- Platforms: 4
- Tracks: 2
- Train operators: Trenord

Other information
- Classification: silver

History
- Opened: 1863; 163 years ago

Services
Preceding station	Trenord	Following station
Airuno towards Milano Porta Garibaldi	Line S8 (Milan suburban railway service)	Lecco Maggianico towards Lecco
Location
- Location within Lombardy Location within Northern Italy Location within Italy

Calolziocorte railway station, formerly called Calolziocorte-Olginate, is a railway station in Italy. Located on the Lecco–Milan railway, where the line to Bergamo diverges, it serves the municipalities of Calolziocorte and Olginate.

== See also ==
- Milan suburban railway service
