= Colico railway station =

Railway station in Italy

Colico
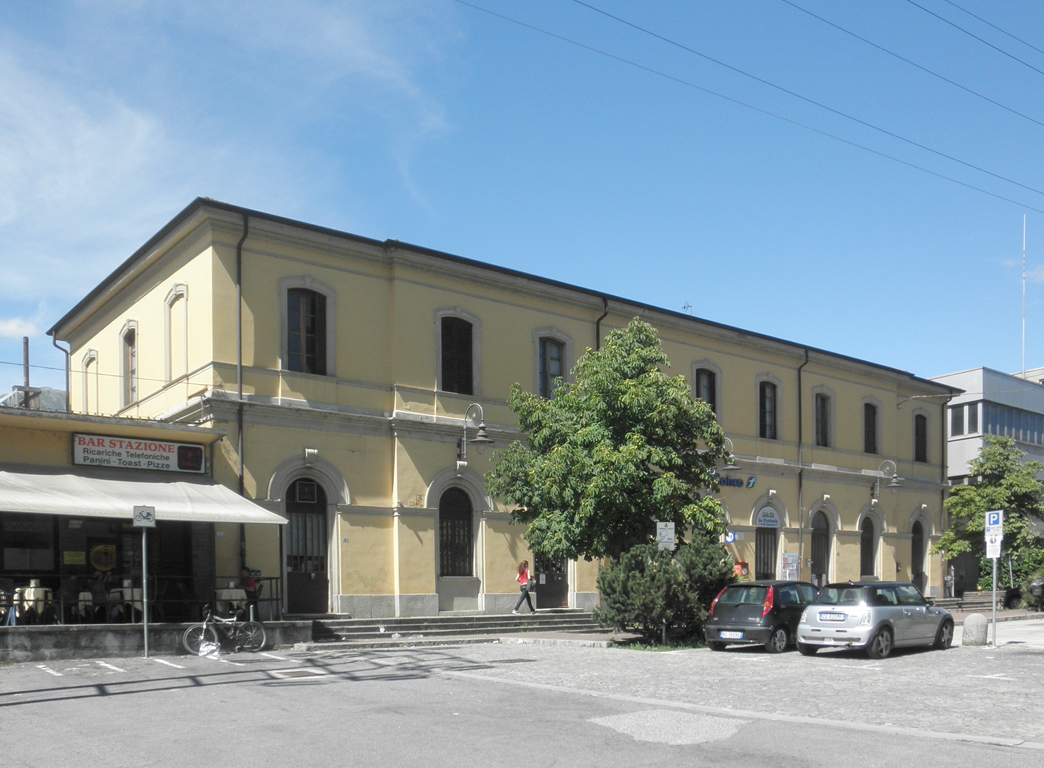

General information
- Location: Piazza Roma; Colico, Lecco, Lombardy; Italy
- Coordinates: 46.135833°N 9.371667°E
- Owner: Rete Ferroviaria Italiana
- Operator: Trenord
- Lines: Lecco-Colico-Sondrio-Tirano; Colico-Chiavenna
- Platforms: 2
- Tracks: 5 for passenger (2Term.) + (3 + 4 + 1)Term.
- Connections: C10 e C11: Como-Menaggio-Colico; A2: Chiavenna-Colico; A10-12: Morbegno-Colico, Colico FS-Via Casello-Corte-Olgiasca.

Construction
- Architect: classic

Other information
- Classification: Silver

History
- Opened: 1892; 134 years ago
- Electrified: 1885
Location
- Location within Lombardy Location within Northern Italy Location within Italy

Colico railway station is a railway station in Italy. Located on the Tirano–Lecco railway (with trains also to and from Milano Centrale) and the Colico-Chiavenna railway, it serves the town of Colico.

== Construction ==
The station building is a two-storey structure - of which the ground floor is usable by travellers - painted yellow. The structure of the building is very simple, with seven arches and a rectangular plan.

Next to the station building is another building, a smaller two-storey structure that houses the station's bar.

The service area has three main tracks and two truncated tracks, the latter being used for the Colico-Chiavenna line. All tracks are served by platforms at the standard European height of 55 centimetres. There are fifteen tracks in total.

The station underwent upgrading works that involved the installation of a modern platform roof made of steel and glass, repainting of the station and the underpass and the installation of new loudspeakers inside the station (atrium and waiting hall); the works were begun in 2012 and finished in 2016.

== Train Services ==
Train services consist of regionale and RegioExpress trains, provided by Trenord according to the contract of service stipulated by the Lombardy Region.

There are about a hundred trains that serve this station and their principal destinations are Milano Centrale, Chiavenna, Sondrio, Tirano and Lecco.

In the final years of the 90's the "Train of the Snow" stopped here, which in the winter connected Napoli Centrale with Tirano.

== Station Services ==
- Ticketing Counter
- Spoken announcements for train arrivals and departures in Italian and English
- Waiting Hall
- Restrooms
- First Aid Post
- Bar

== Interchanges ==
- Bus - Urbana (Colico-Frazioni-Colico) line
- Bus - C10 (Colico-Menaggio-Como) line
- Bus - A10 (Colico-Morbegno) line
- Taxi
