= Carnate derailment =

2020 railway incident in Lombardy, Italy

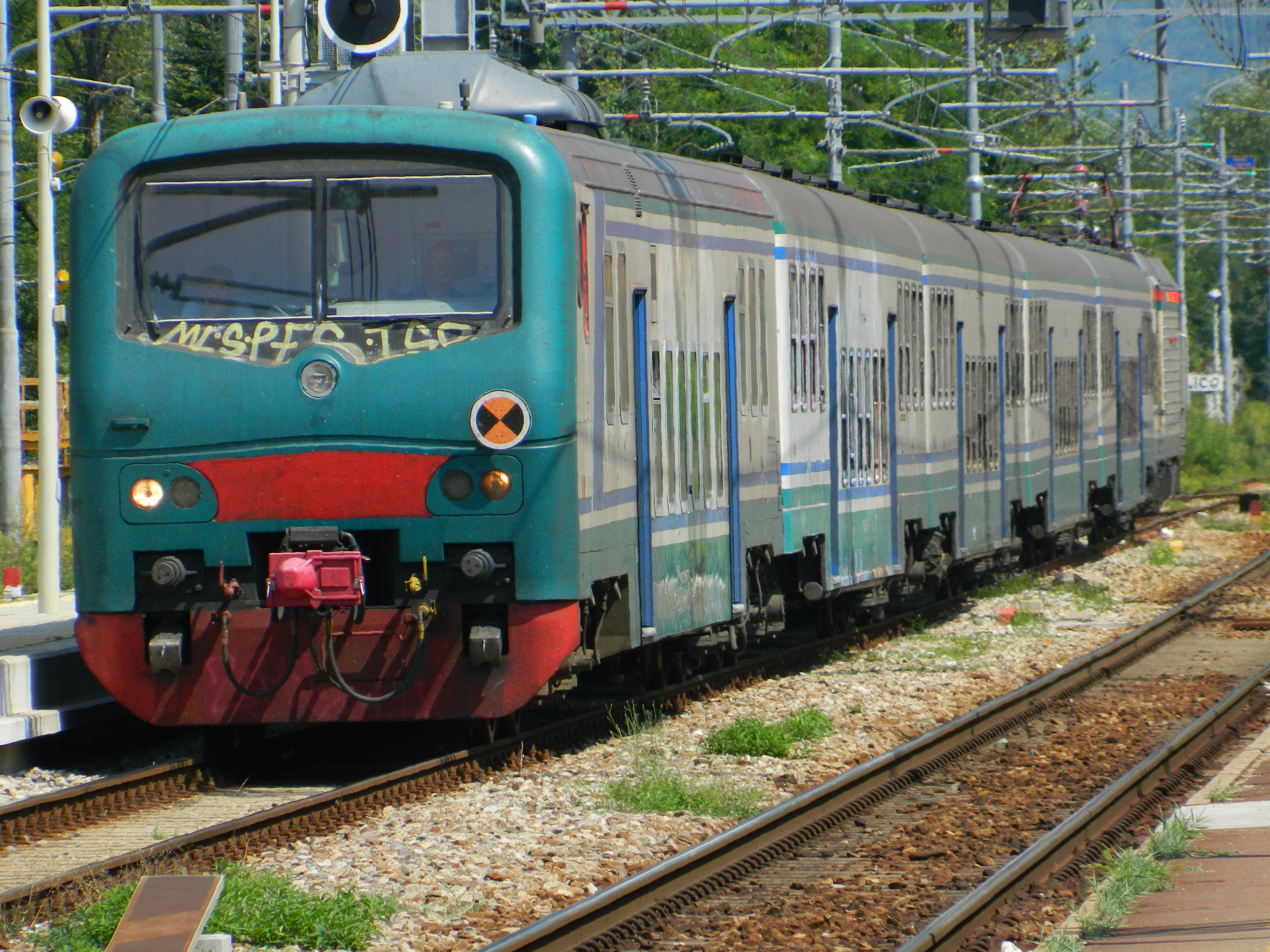
- A similar low-floor train with control car, and Class E.464 locomotive at end.

Details
- Date: 19 August 2020
- Location: Paderno-Robbiate station[it] (runaway); Carnate-Usmate station (derailment)
- Coordinates: 45°39′11″N 9°22′30″E
- Country: Italy
- Line: Seregno–Bergamo railway
- Operator: Trenord (train); RFI (line)
- Incident type: Runaway and derailment
- Cause: Under investigation

Statistics
- Trains: 1
- Passengers: 1
- Crew: 2
- Injured: 3

The Carnate derailment occurred in Lombardy, Italy on 19 August 2020 when a passenger train ran away from Paderno-Robbiate station [it] and was derailed at Carnate-Usmate station.

== Accident ==
The train was reported to have run away from Paderno d'Adda without crew, and with a passenger detected after the derailment. The train was to operate a Paderno d'Adda-Milan service about 25 minutes after the start of the runaway from Paderno d'Adda, which took place about 15 minutes after its arrival from Milan; it included a Class E.464 locomotive (in the rear position), six carriages and a control car.

After travelling for 7 kilometres (4.3 mi), the train was diverted into a siding at Carnate-Usmate station. The control car and the first three carriages of the train derailed. Three people were injured (the passenger, and the 2 crew members while trying to get on the runaway train in Paderno d'Adda); they all suffered minor injuries, and the passenger was taken to the hospital for checks.

The driver and conductor of the train were suspended from duty after the accident.

== Investigation ==
An investigation was opened into the accident. The Polfer [it] is responsible for investigating railway accidents in Italy. The train event recorder was recovered from the E.464 and handed over to investigators.
