= Oggiono railway station =

Railway station in Italy

Oggiono
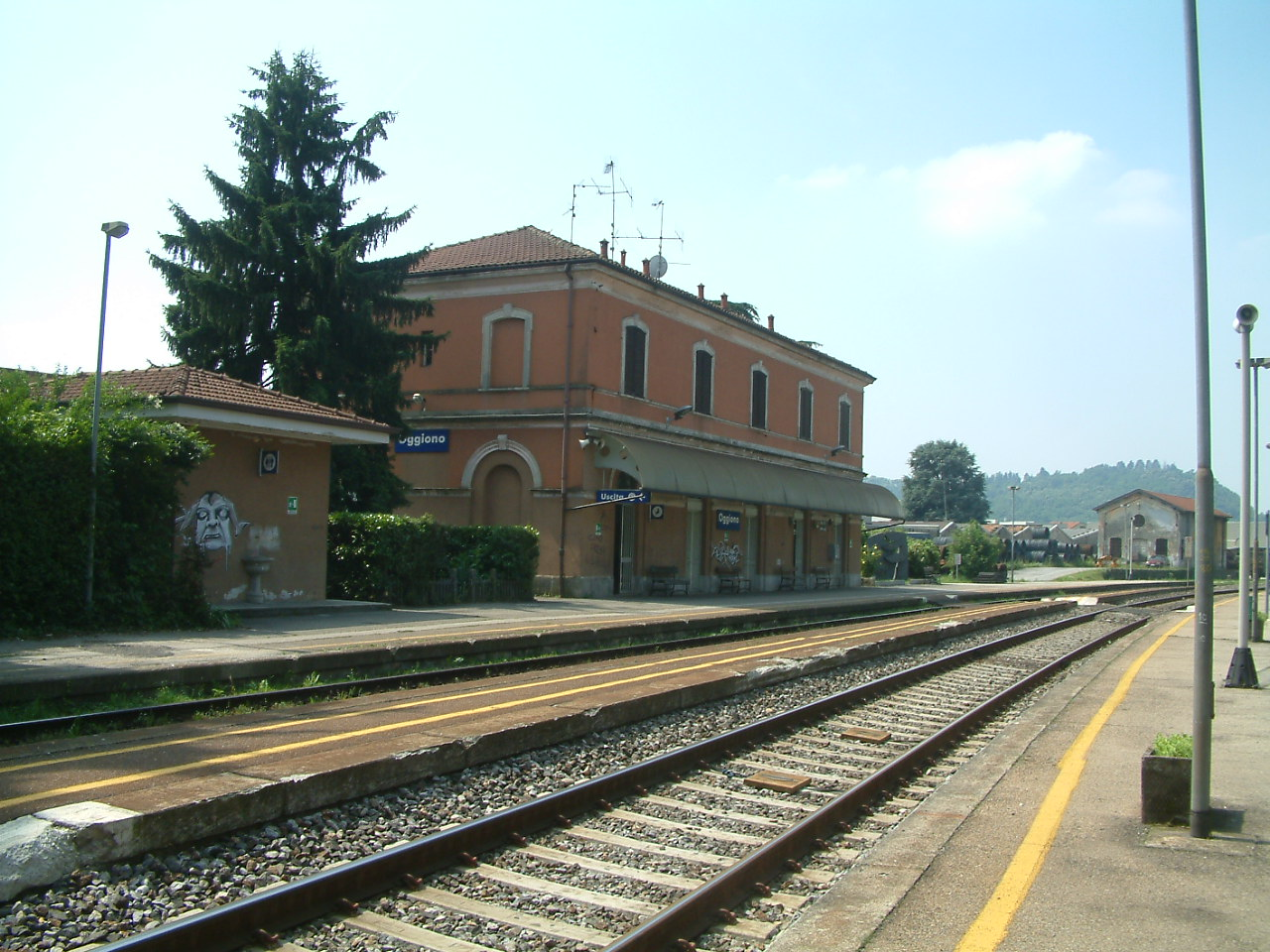

General information
- Location: Oggiono, Lecco, Lombardy; Italy
- Coordinates: 45°47′20″N 09°20′16″E
- Operator: Rete Ferroviaria Italiana
- Line: Como–Lecco
- Distance: 11.716 km (7.280 mi) from Lecco
- Platforms: 1
- Tracks: 1
- Train operators: Trenord

Other information
- Classification: silver

Services
Preceding station	Trenord	Following station
Molteno towards Milano Porta Garibaldi	Line S7 (Milan suburban railway service)	Sala al Barro–Galbiate towards Lecco
Location
- Location within Lombardy Location within Northern Italy Location within Italy

Oggiono railway station is a railway station in Italy. Located on the Como–Lecco railway, it serves the municipality of Oggiono in Lombardy. The train services are operated by Trenord.

== Train services ==
The station is served by the following service(s):

- Milan Metropolitan services (S7) Milan – Molteno – Lecco
- Lombardy Regional services (R18) Como – Molteno – Lecco

== See also ==
- Milan suburban railway network
