= Sala al Barro–Galbiate railway station =

Railway station in Italy

Sala al Barro–Galbiate
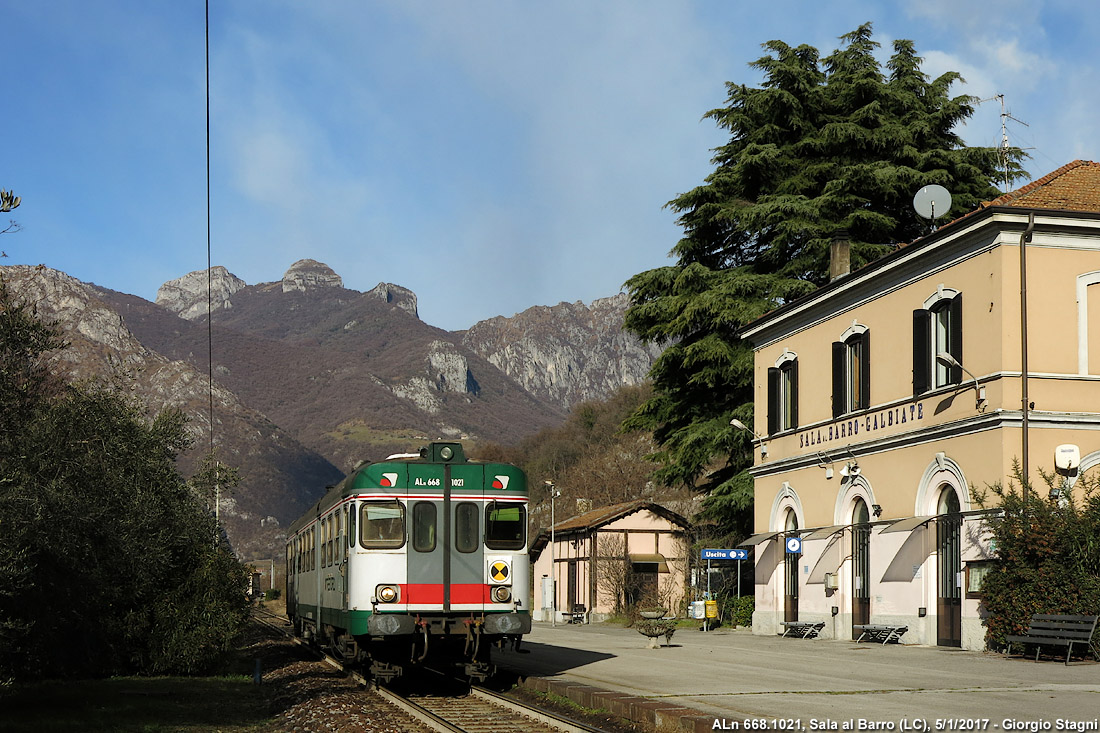

General information
- Location: Galbiate, Lecco, Lombardy; Italy
- Coordinates: 45°49′17″N 09°21′34″E
- Operator: Rete Ferroviaria Italiana
- Line: Como–Lecco
- Distance: 7.124 km (4.427 mi) from Lecco
- Platforms: 1
- Tracks: 1
- Train operators: Trenord

Other information
- Classification: bronze

Services
Preceding station	Trenord	Following station
Oggiono towards Milano Porta Garibaldi	Line S7 (Milan suburban railway service)	Civate towards Lecco
Location
- Location within Lombardy Location within Northern Italy Location within Italy

Sala al Barro–Galbiate railway station is a railway station in Italy. Located on the Como–Lecco railway, it serves the municipality of Galbiate in Lombardy. The train services are operated by Trenord.

== Train services ==
The station is served by the following service(s):

- Milan Metropolitan services (S7) Milan – Molteno – Lecco
- Lombardy Regional services (R18) Como – Molteno – Lecco

== See also ==
- Milan suburban railway network
