= Lecco Maggianico railway station =

Railway station in Italy

Lecco Maggianico

General information
- Location: Maggianico; Lecco, Lecco, Lombardy; Italy
- Coordinates: 45°49′51″N 09°24′43″E
- Operator: Rete Ferroviaria Italiana
- Line: Lecco–Milan
- Distance: 29.713 km (18.463 mi) from Bergamo
- Platforms: 2
- Tracks: 2
- Train operators: Trenord

Other information
- Classification: silver

History
- Opened: 1882

Services
Preceding station	Trenord	Following station
Calolziocorte towards Milano Porta Garibaldi	Line S8 (Milan suburban railway service)	Lecco Terminus
Location
- Location within Lombardy Location within Northern Italy Location within Italy

Lecco Maggianico is a railway station in Italy. Located on the Lecco–Milan railway, it serves the southern part of the municipality of Lecco as its secondary station.

== Services ==
Lecco Maggianico is served by the line S8 of the Milan suburban railway service, operated by the Lombard railway company Trenord.

== See also ==
- Milan suburban railway service
