= Airuno railway station =

Railway station in Italy

Airuno
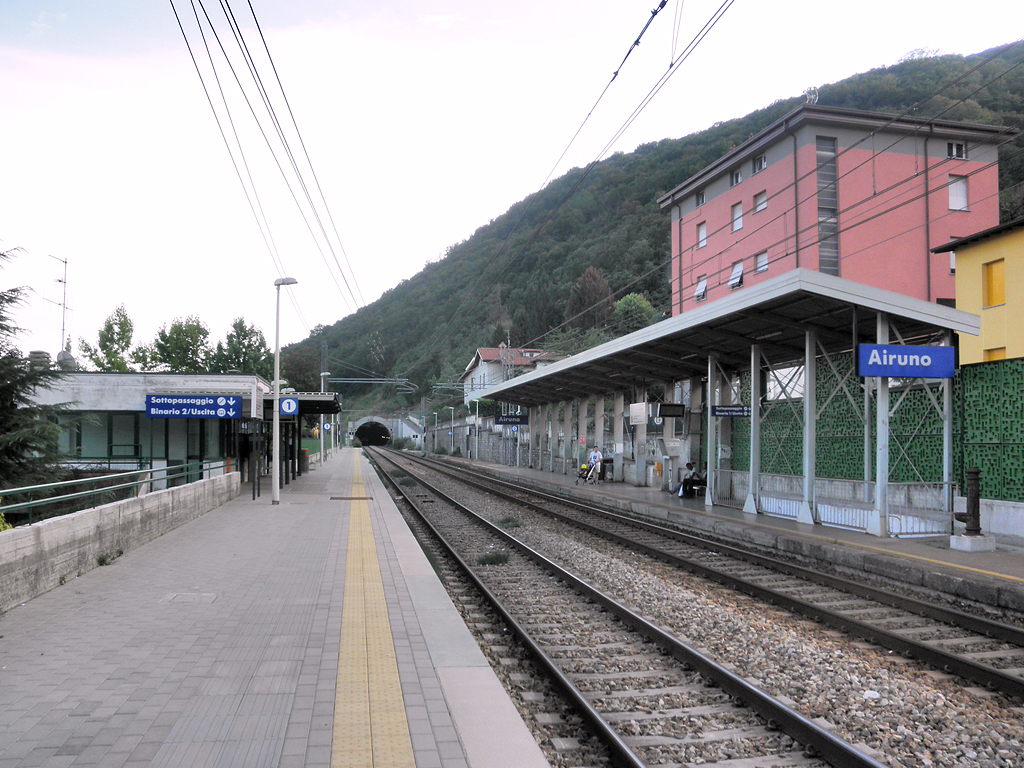

General information
- Location: Piazza Stazione; Airuno, Lecco, Lombardy; Italy
- Coordinates: 45°45′20″N 09°25′20″E
- Operator: Rete Ferroviaria Italiana
- Line: Lecco–Milan
- Distance: 24.184 km (15.027 mi) from Monza
- Platforms: 2
- Tracks: 2
- Train operators: Trenord

Other information
- Classification: Silver

History
- Opened: 1896

Services
Preceding station	Trenord	Following station
Olgiate–Calco–Brivio towards Milano Porta Garibaldi	Line S8 (Milan suburban railway service)	Calolziocorte towards Lecco
Location
- Location within Lombardy Location within Northern Italy Location within Italy

Airuno is a railway station in Italy. Located on the Lecco–Milan railway, it serves the municipality of Airuno.

== Services ==
Airuno is served by the line S8 of the Milan suburban railway service, operated by the Lombard railway company Trenord.

== See also ==
- Milan suburban railway service
