= Cremona railway station =

Railway station in Cremona, Italy

Cremona
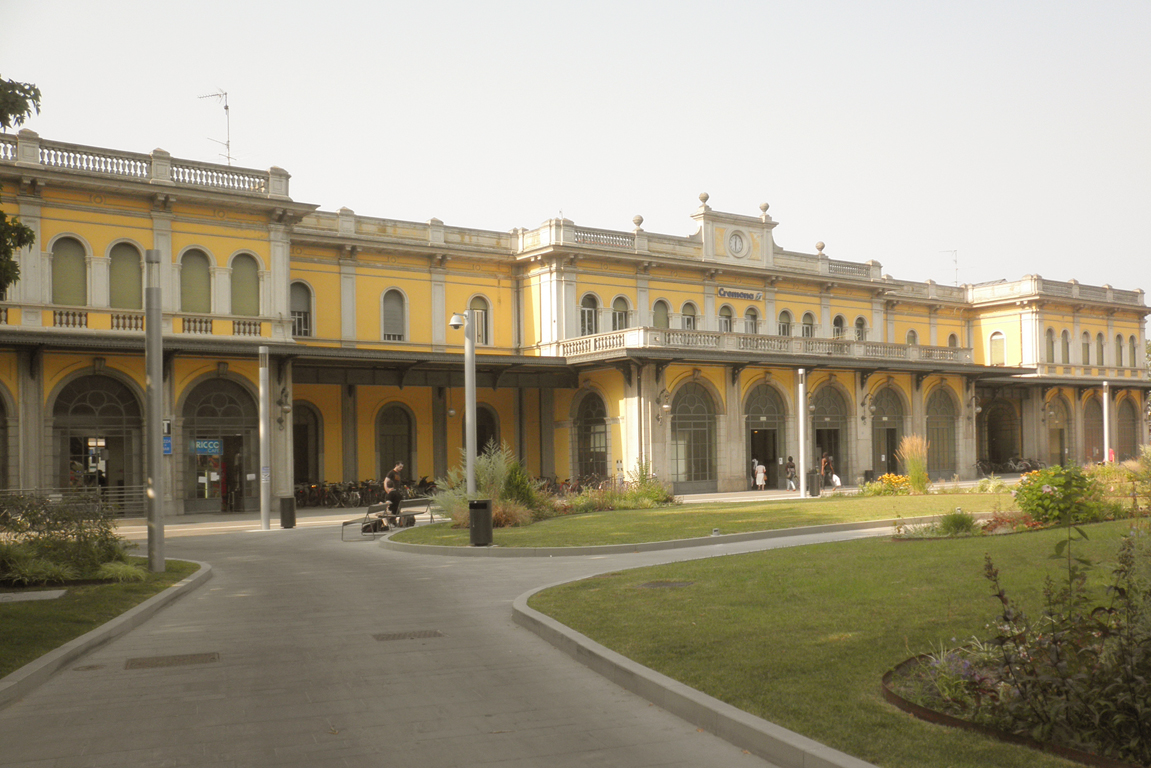
- The passenger building.

General information
- Location: Via Dante; 26100 Cremona; Cremona, Cremona, Lombardy; Italy
- Coordinates: 45°08′36″N 10°01′04″E
- Operator: Rete Ferroviaria Italiana; Centostazioni
- Lines: Pavia–Mantua; Treviglio–Cremona; Brescia–Cremona; Cremona–Fidenza; Piacenza–Cremona (freight only)
- Distance: 27.330 km (16.982 mi) from Codogno
- Train operators: Trenitalia; Trenord
- Connections: Urban and suburban buses

Other information
- Classification: Gold

History
- Opened: 1 May 1863; 163 years ago
- Electrified: May 1977
Location
- Location within Lombardy Location within Northern Italy Location within Italy

Cremona railway station (Italian: Stazione di Cremona) is the main station serving the city and comune of Cremona, in the region of Lombardy, northern Italy. Located on the Pavia–Mantua railway, it is terminus of the lines linking Cremona with Treviglio, Brescia, Piacenza and Fidenza.

The station is currently managed by Rete Ferroviaria Italiana (RFI). However, the commercial area of the passenger building is managed by Centostazioni. Train services are operated by Trenord and Trenitalia.

== Location ==
Cremona railway station is situated at Via Dante, at the northern edge of the city centre.

== History ==
The station was opened on 1 May 1863, upon the inauguration of the final section of the Treviglio–Cremona railway, between Casalbuttano and Cremona.

== Features ==
The passenger building at the station consists of a central section and two lateral wings, all of which are on two levels. On the ground floor, there are services for travellers such as a ticket office and waiting room, while the upper floor is used by Trenitalia.

Five tracks pass through the part of the station yard bordered by the station platforms. All of these tracks are used for passenger service, with the exception of track 2, which has no platform.

Track 1 is accessed by passenger from the platform at the rear of the passenger building. Tracks 3 and 4 are served by an island platform equipped with shelters and linked with the passenger building by two underpasses. There is also a third platform (not accessible to passengers) between tracks 5 and 6, which are used only for cargo handling and storage of rolling stock.

In addition to a goods yard, the station is equipped with a locomotive shed and a turntable.

== Passenger and train movements ==
The station has about 4.8 million passenger movements each year.

Cremona is the terminus of regional services originating from Milan and Treviglio, from Brescia, from Piacenza and from Fidenza. It is also the terminus of the regional routes between Codogno and Cremona, and between Cremona and Mantua, and is connected by direct regional services with Milano Centrale (or Milano Greco Pirelli), via Mantua.

== Interchange ==
Near the passenger building is a bus station, which is served by suburban bus lines. These lines link Cremona with the other major centres in the province and neighboring provinces.

== See also ==
- History of rail transport in Italy
- List of railway stations in Lombardy
- Rail transport in Italy
- Railway stations in Italy
