= San Michele Bridge =

San Michele Bridge Ponte San Michele
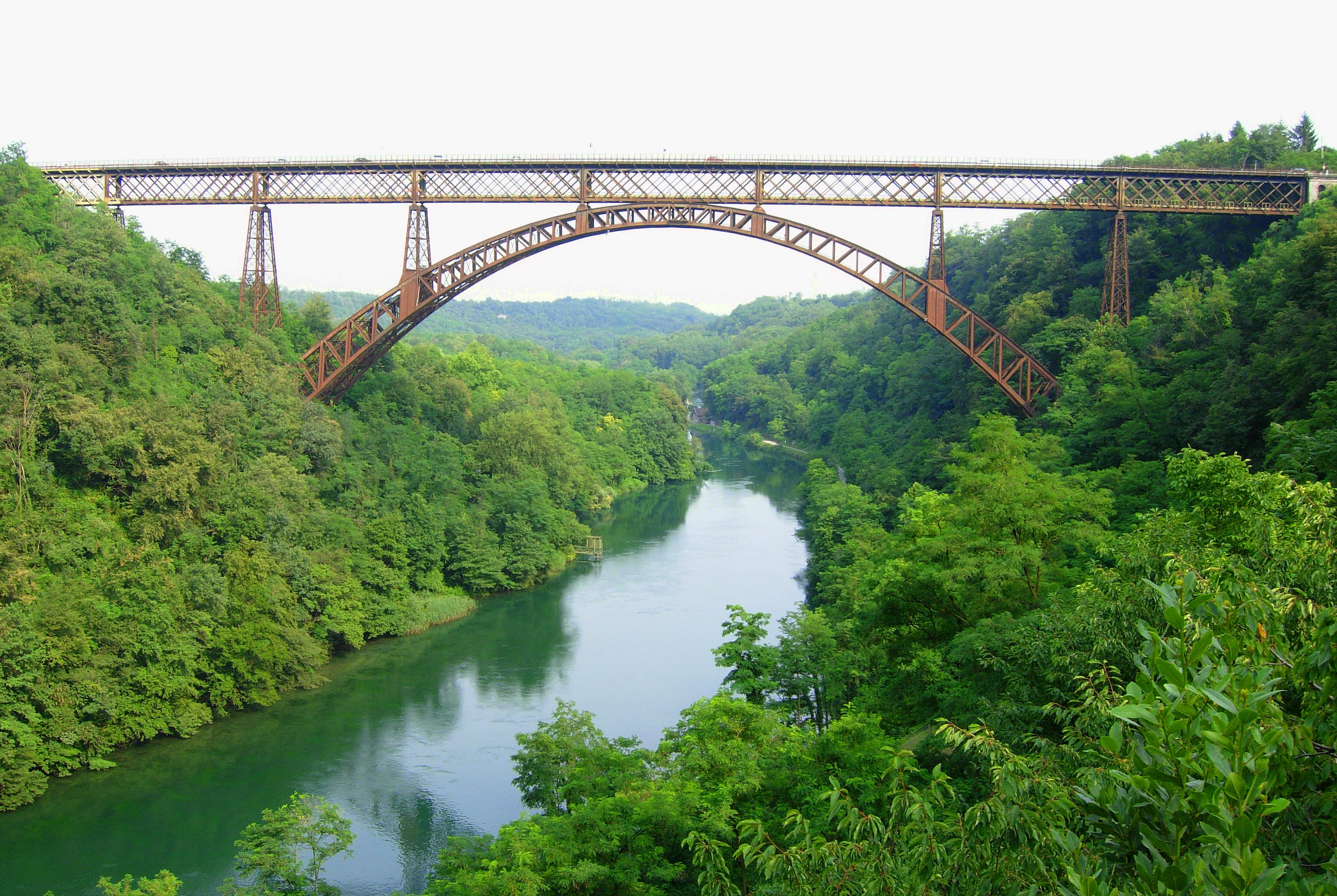
- Coordinates: 45°40′56″N 9°27′9″E
- Carries: Railway and roadway
- Crosses: Adda River
- Locale: Paderno d'Adda and Calusco d'Adda, Lombardy, Italy

Characteristics
- Design: truss arch bridge
- Material: Cast-iron
- Total length: 266 m (873 ft)
- Height: 85 m (279 ft)
- Longest span: 150 m (490 ft)

History
- Construction start: 1887
- Construction end: 1889

Location
- Interactive map of San Michele Bridge

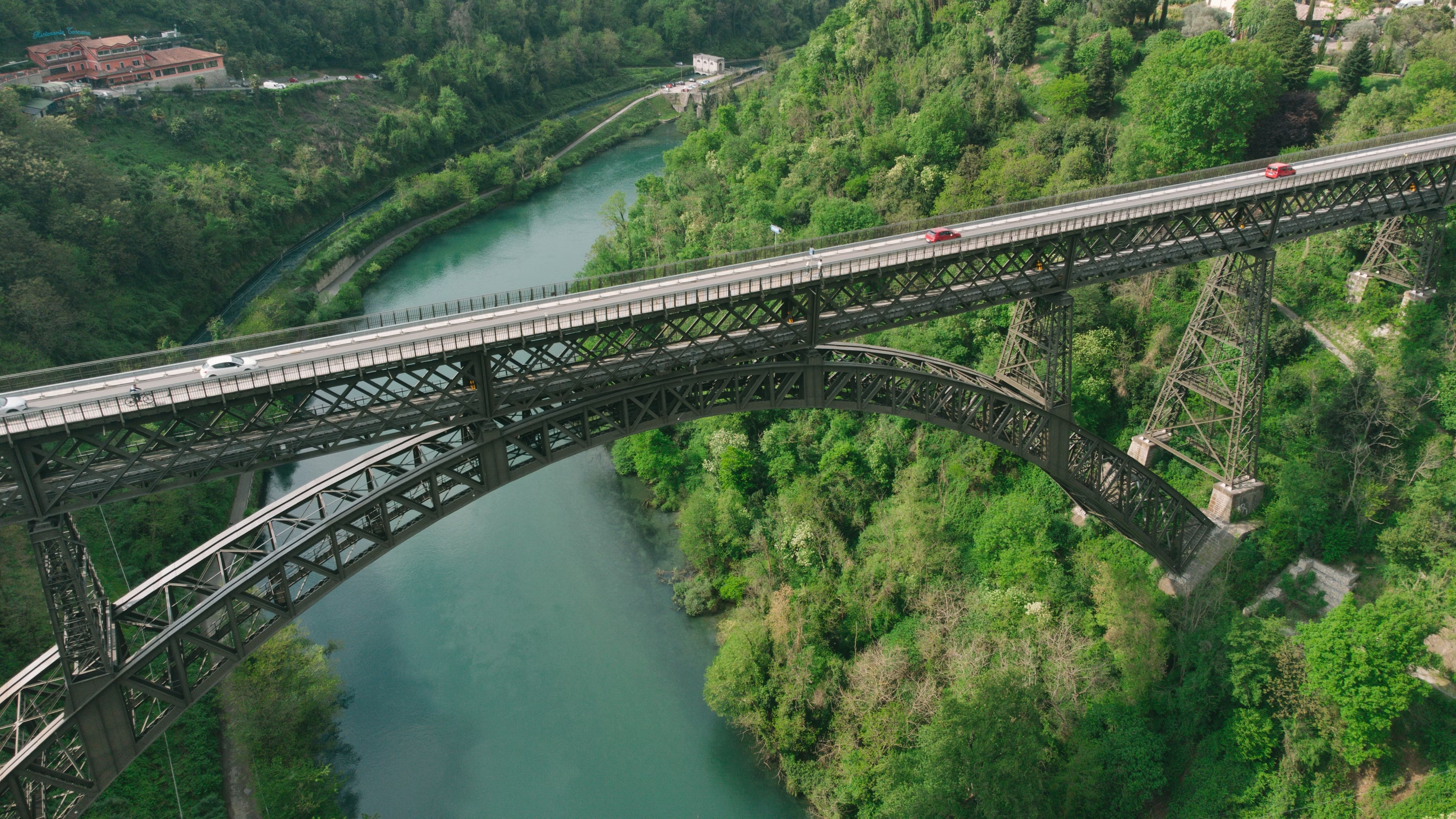
Closeup view of bridge showing upper and lower decks

The San Michele Bridge (Italian: Ponte San Michele), also known as the Paderno Bridge (Italian: Ponte di Paderno), is a multi-level rail and road truss arch bridge across the Adda River in Lombardy, Italy. The bridge connects Paderno d'Adda, Lecco on the west bank with Calusco d'Adda, Bergamo on the east bank.

The cast-iron bridge was designed by Swiss engineer Jules Röthlisberger and completed in 1889. Not welded, the bridge consists of riveted beams held together by over 100,000 nails. The bridge crosses the upper Adda River gorge that divides the western and eastern parts of Lombardy. With a height of 85 m (279 ft) and a span length of 150 m (490 ft), the San Michele Bridge was one of the largest arch bridges in the world at the time of its completion.

The upper deck of the bridge is a traffic controlled single-lane vehicular roadway and the lower deck is a single-track section of the Seregno–Bergamo railway. Today the bridge also serves as a historical tourist attraction demonstrating late 19th-century engineering ingenuity.

== History ==
The bridge was built between 1887 and 1889 to serve as a railway connection between the banks of the river Adda. After the Unification of Italy, the newborn kingdom began a coordination project within the railway routes managed by many private companies. These routes were mainly local, non-homogeneous regarding means and materials. Often these railroads weren't adequately connected.

Milan saw its first railways in August 1840, when the connection with Monza was opened: the presence of the river Adda, however, divided Milan from the emerging industrial regions that gravitated around Bergamo and Brescia (the latter being of particular strategic value thanks to its military production). Furthermore, along the Adda river were many textile factories and the existing communications routes were becoming increasingly inadequate compared to the needs of industrialization. This scenario brought to the decision of building a railway link between Carnate-Usmate and Ponte San Pietro, so as to efficiently connect the area's productive poles.

The first project was entrusted to the Società per le Strade Ferrate Meridionali (Southern Railways Society), which also was expected to build the railway track: this first project consisted of an iron beamed multi-masted bridge, with a rectilinear structure. This bridge would have had two levels: the upper level for the railway and the lower level for the vehicular roadway. The Società Nazionale Officine di Savigliano (SNOS) was allowed to participate with its own project in March 1886, consisting of 12 technical drawings. The SNOS had already built other iron bridges; among them, the One on Po river in Casale Monferrato, the one on Tanaro river in Asti and also the first road bridge in Trezzo sull'Adda. The competition saw four participating projects in total and the Consiglio Superiore dei Lavori Pubblici (technical body of the homonymous ministry) assigned the task to the SNOS. On 22 January 1887 the commendator Di Lena, General Inspector of Railways, signed the contract with the Piedmontese company represented by General Director Engineer Moreno. The agreed duration of the work was of only eighteen months. Small changes were made to the original project, making the bridge 42 metres longer and bringing it to its current size. The construction of the bridge would cost 1,850,000 italian lire, plus 128,717.50 lire for the preliminary works.

A first service bridge was built with 1,800 cubic metres of pine wood imported from Bavaria. This temporary structure was built in 11 months due to the complexity of the location; during this time the plinths and the foundations of Ponte San Michele were built thanks to the continuous flow of granite and stone that were shipped on barges on the Adda river. 2,515 tons of iron and 110 tons of cast iron were imported from German foundries and further processed in Savigliano to obtain the modules used to build the structure. Said modules were transported to Paderno by train and then brought into position using a funicular powered by a locomotive. SNOS provided the construction site with 470 workers: thanks to the efficiency of the logistics and the organization, the deadline for the completion of the bridge was respected, even though there were some victims among the workers.

In March 1889 the construction was completed; the same year, in May, the first test was carried out in the pouring rain, consisting in the transit of a heavy train at first at a speed of 25 km/h, then at 35 km/h and finally – as reported in the local newspaper L'Eco di Bergamo – at the incredible speed of 45 km/h. The convoy was composed by 3 locomotives of 83 tons each, carrying 30 cars. It was longer than the entire bridge and had a total weight of 850 tons. In this day an urban legend began to spread, stating that the bridge's designer – Röthlisberger – committed suicide before the test, fearing a failure of the bridge. This would have led to the start of a series of suicides from the bridge (Röthlisberger actually didn't commit suicide in 1889 but died of pneumonia in his house in Chaumont-Neuchatel on 25 August 1911).

The blessing ceremony took place on 26 May 1889, attended by Archbishop of Milan Luigi Nazari di Calabiana and other members of the Milanese clergy. The opening of the bridge was celebrated on 30 June in Paderno d'Adda in the presence of the authorities. The ceremony was attended by many engineers, including Röthlisberger. A refreshment took place on a hill near the bridge, where the mayor of Robbiate gave a celebratory speech, inviting everybody to a collective hug between the Adda people. Senator Giuseppe Robecchi paid homage to the hundreds of workers involved in the construction of the bridge. The bridge officially entered service on 1 July 1889. In 1890, with a new painting, the bridge was fully concluded. Only three years after the first test, another one was carried out to understand if the bridge could carry new generation locomotives, which were more powerful but also heavier.

Fast and stable connections were established between the two parts of Lombardy thanks to the opening of the bridge, reducing the travel time and making the opening of new trade routes viable, for example between the productive areas of eastern Piedmont (Novara and Vercelli) and the industries of eastern Lombardy (especially in the Bergamo and Brescia territories). At the time of its completion, the bridge was already considered an engineering masterpiece, to the point that he was mentioned as one of the greatest arched bridges in the world and was taken as an excellent example of civil engineering, both for its bold project and for the skills that made its construction possible.

The bridge wasn't seriously damaged during the Second World War, even though bombings happened in the area and some shells fell in the Adda valley; the bridge nevertheless needed some consolidation work after the war, carried out by the military engineering corps. A restoration of the whole structure took place in the early 1950s. Important restoration work also took place in 1972 and in 1992; in the 1980s the bridge was added to the list of the protected sites by the Soprintendenza per i Beni Ambientali e Architettonici della Regione Lombardia (Superintendency for Environmental and Architectural Heritage of Region Lombardy). Despite all the restoration work, some limitations were applied to the traffic on the bridge, regarding both the motor vehicles and the speed of the trains. During the XX century the bridge was also used for bungee jumping with the installation of specific temporary structures, but they were removed because of their non-compliance with the existing regulations.

=== 2018–2020 restoration work ===
On 15 September 2018 the bridge was urgently closed to all types of traffic, after the monitoring system run by RFI (the Italian railway infrastructure manager) found abnormal and worrying values about the bridge's conditions. The maintenance work was estimated to last about two years. Starting from 15 September, the trains only ran between Milan and Paderno and between Calusco and Bergamo; a shuttle service was activated at first between the stations of Paderno and Calusco (the two stations between which the bridge is located), then it was extended to Terno d'Isola. This shuttle service crossed the Adda river on another bridge in the town of Brivio.

The bridge was reopened to pedestrians and bicycles on 29 March 2019, along with the activation of a coordinated shuttle service, this time between the stations of Paderno and Calusco and the bridge, allowing the passengers to cross it by foot. On 8 November 2019 the bridge was reopened to vehicular traffic. Another shuttle service was activated, directly crossing the bridge and linking the stations of Paderno and Calusco. The existing shuttle service that used the bridge in Brivio to cross the river was suppressed on 15 December.

The restoration work went on during the COVID-19 pandemic, when a lockdown was imposed on the entire nation from 9 March to 18 May 2020. The bridge was finally reopened to trains on 14 September 2020, exactly two years after its closure. All shuttle services were consequently discontinued.
