= Tirano railway station =

Tirano railway station could refer to two railway stations in Tirano, Italy:

- Tirano railway station (RFI): railway station on the Tirano–Lecco railway
- Tirano railway station (RhB): railway station on the Bernina railway
