= Sondrio railway station =

Railway station in Italy

Sondrio
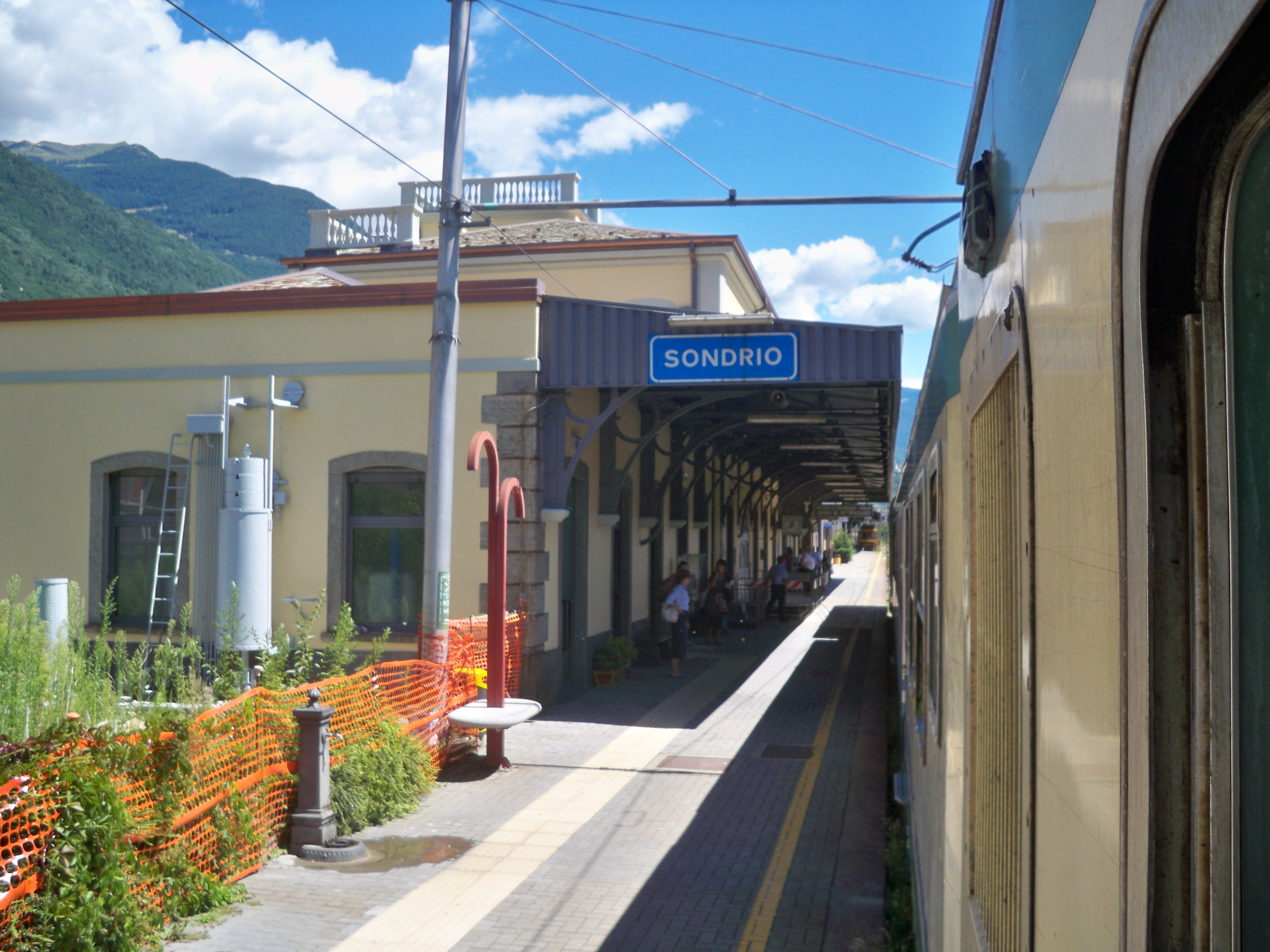
- View from a train towards the main platform.

General information
- Location: Piazzale Giovanni Bertacchi; 23100 Sondrio SO; Sondrio, Sondrio, Lombardy; Italy
- Coordinates: 46°10′02″N 09°52′22″E
- Operator: Rete Ferroviaria Italiana; Centostazioni
- Line: Tirano–Lecco
- Distance: 40.498 km (25.164 mi) from Colico
- Train operators: Trenord
- Connections: Suburban buses

Other information
- Classification: Gold

History
- Opened: 16 June 1885; 141 years ago
Location
- Location within Lombardy Location within Northern Italy Location within Italy

Sondrio railway station (Italian: Stazione di Sondrio) serves the town and comune of Sondrio, in the region of Lombardy, northern Italy. Opened in 1885, it is located on the Tirano–Lecco railway.

The station is currently managed by Rete Ferroviaria Italiana (RFI). However, the commercial area of the passenger building is managed by Centostazioni. Train services are operated by Trenord. Each of these companies is a subsidiary of Ferrovie dello Stato (FS), Italy's state-owned rail company.

== Location ==
Sondrio railway station is situated in Piazza Giovanni Bertacchi, at the southeastern edge of the town centre.

== History ==
The station was opened on 16 June 1885, upon the inauguration of the Lecco–Colico–Sondrio section of the Valtellina railway. Like the rest of the line, the station was part of the Rete Adriatica (RA) (English: Adriatic Network), which, from 1 July 1885, was headed by the management of the Società per le Strade Ferrate Meridionali (SFM) (English: Company for the Southern Railways).

On 29 June 1902, the line was extended to Tirano, as the Alta Valtellina railway, operated by the Società Ferrovia Alta Valtellina (FAV) (English: Alta Valtellina Railway Company).

As a consequence of the nationalization of the Italian railways on 1 July 1905, the Valtellina line from Lecco and its rolling stock passed into the ownership of the FS. In 1970, the FS also assumed control of the Alta Valtellina line to Tirano.

== Features ==
The passenger building, following a renovation, consists of the following public spaces: ticketing, bar, kiosk and waiting room. Since the renovation, the waiting room has occupied the space previously allocated to a first class waiting room. The upholstered chairs previously located there have been replaced by wooden benches from the old second class waiting room.

The building containing the public conveniences, which was expanded in 2009, is now Milanese in style, with a green space in front of which there is a fountain with drinking water.

In front of the station, extending over the tracks, is the locomotive shed, which currently houses the historical resources of the rail heritage group ALe 883.

At the Tirano end of the station, inside some detached buildings, are the headquarters of the Railway Police. There is also a goods yard, no longer in use, and access to the pedestrian underpass, which links the passenger building with platforms 2 and 3, the bus station, the free municipal parking at the Policampus, the school campus and the districts beyond the railway.

== Interchange ==
In the square in front of the passenger building, there is a taxi rank and bus stop servicing bus routes 1, 3 and 4, operated by ASM Sondrio.

A STPS bus stop is also located near the station.

== See also ==
- History of rail transport in Italy
- List of railway stations in Lombardy
- Rail transport in Italy
- Railway stations in Italy
