= Brescia–Cremona railway =

Railway line in Italy

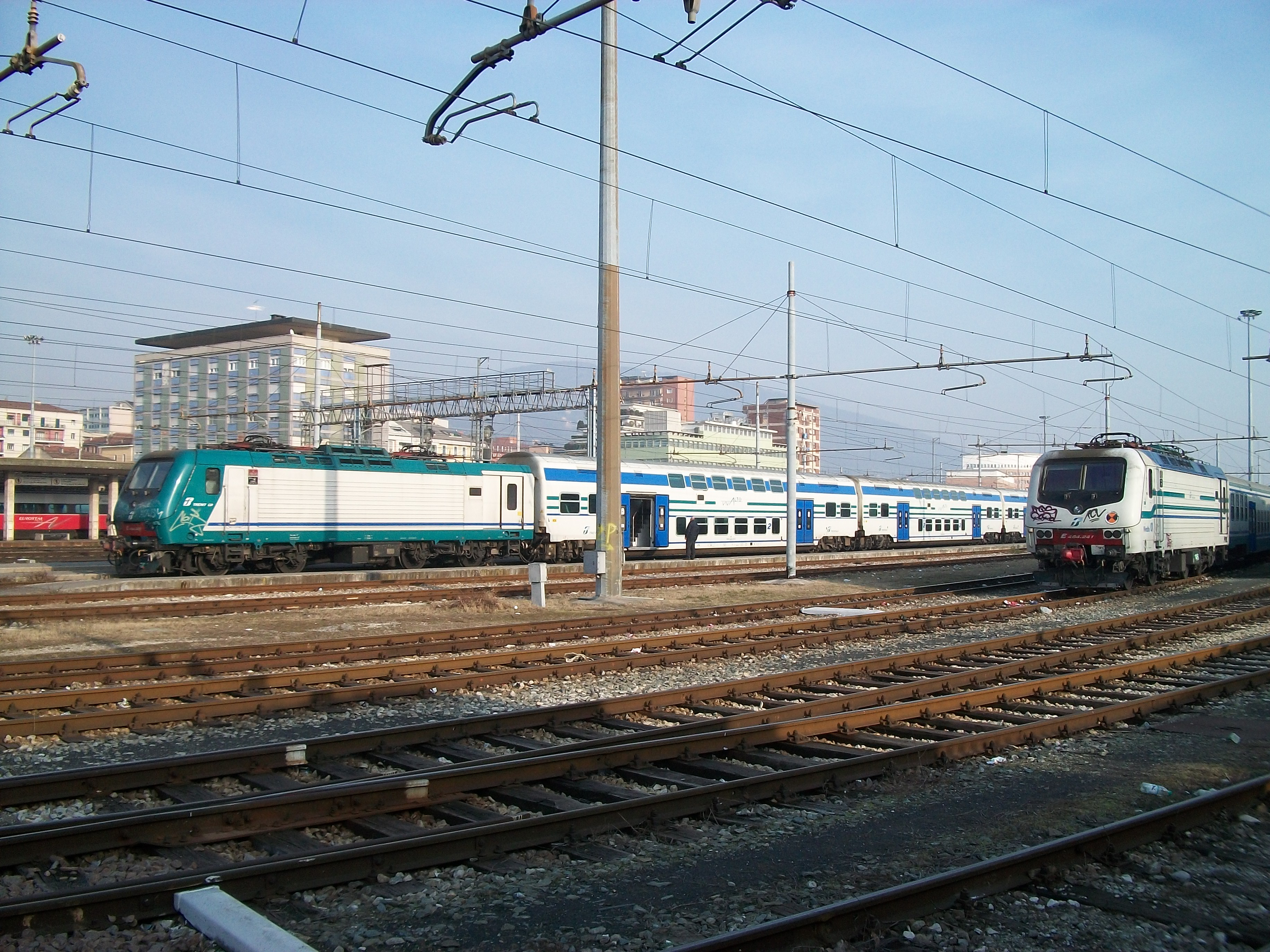
- Several passenger trains at Brescia station in 2012

Overview
- Native name: Ferrovia Brescia-Cremona
- Status: in use
- Owner: RFI
- Locale: Lombardy, Italy
- Termini: Brescia railway station; Cremona railway station
- Stations: 8

Service
- Type: heavy rail
- Services: R5
- Operator(s): Trenord

History
- Opened: 15 December 1866

Technical
- Line length: 50 km (31 mi)
- Number of tracks: 1
- Track gauge: 1,435 mm (4 ft 8 1/2 in) standard gauge
- Electrification: 3 kV DC
Route map
- Source: Italian railway atlas

Brescia–Cremona railway is a railway line in Lombardy, Italy.

== History ==
The line was opened on 15 December 1866.

In 1984 it was electrified with a 3 kV DC overhead line.

== See also ==
- List of railway lines in Italy
