= Seregno–Bergamo railway =

Railway line in Italy

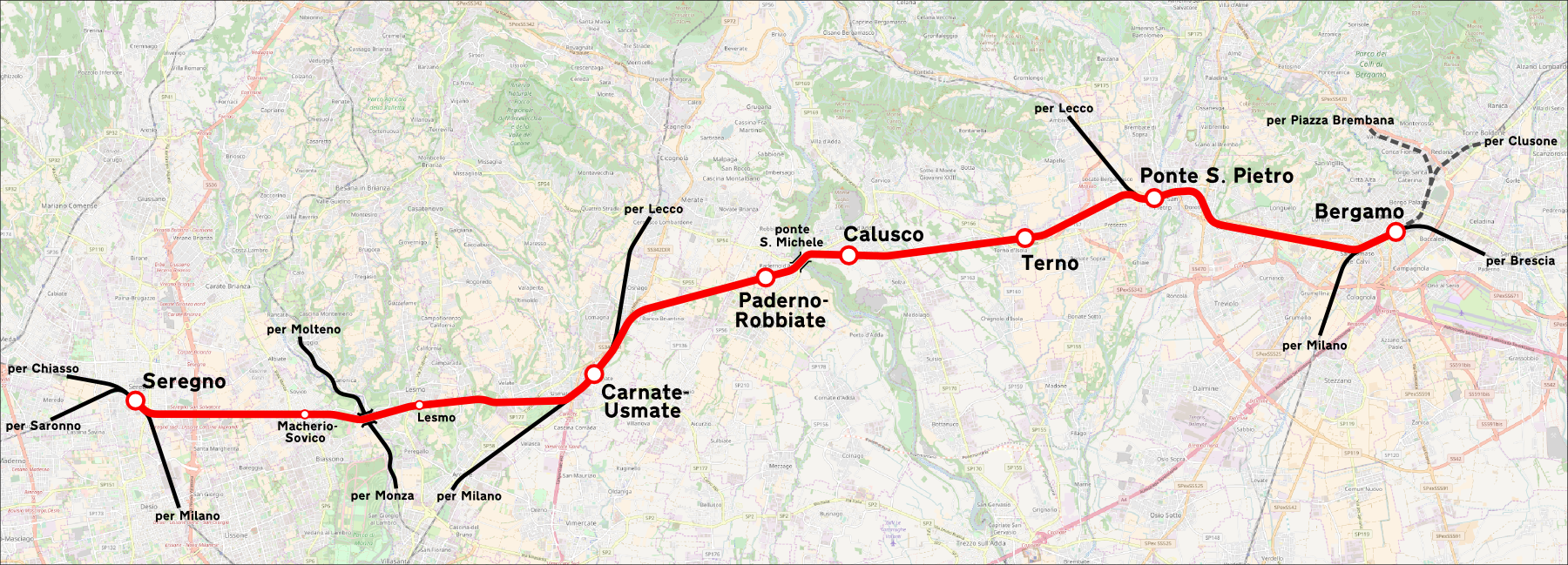

Overview
- Status: partially in use
- Owner: RFI
- Locale: Lombardy, Italy
- Termini: Carnate-Usmate railway station (Note: Service to Seregno suspended.); Bergamo railway station
- Stations: 7

Service
- Type: heavy rail
- Services: R14
- Route number: 172
- Operator(s): Trenord

History
- Opened: 1 July 1889

Technical
- Line length: 40 km (25 mi)
- Number of tracks: 1
- Track gauge: 1,435 mm (4 ft 8 1/2 in) standard gauge
- Electrification: 3 kV DC overhead line
- Operating speed: 120 km/h (75 mph)

The Seregno–Bergamo railway is a railway line in Lombardy, Italy.

== History ==
The line was opened in two sections: from Seregno to Carnate on 24 September 1888, and from Carnate to Ponte San Pietro on 1 July 1889 with the completion of the San Michele Bridge across the Adda River. From Ponte San Pietro to Bergamo the line used the existing track of the line to Lecco, dating to 1863.

The section between Carnate and Bergamo is used by the regional service of the Milan–Bergamo railway.

== See also ==
- List of railway lines in Italy
