= Cremona–Fidenza railway =

Railway line in Italy

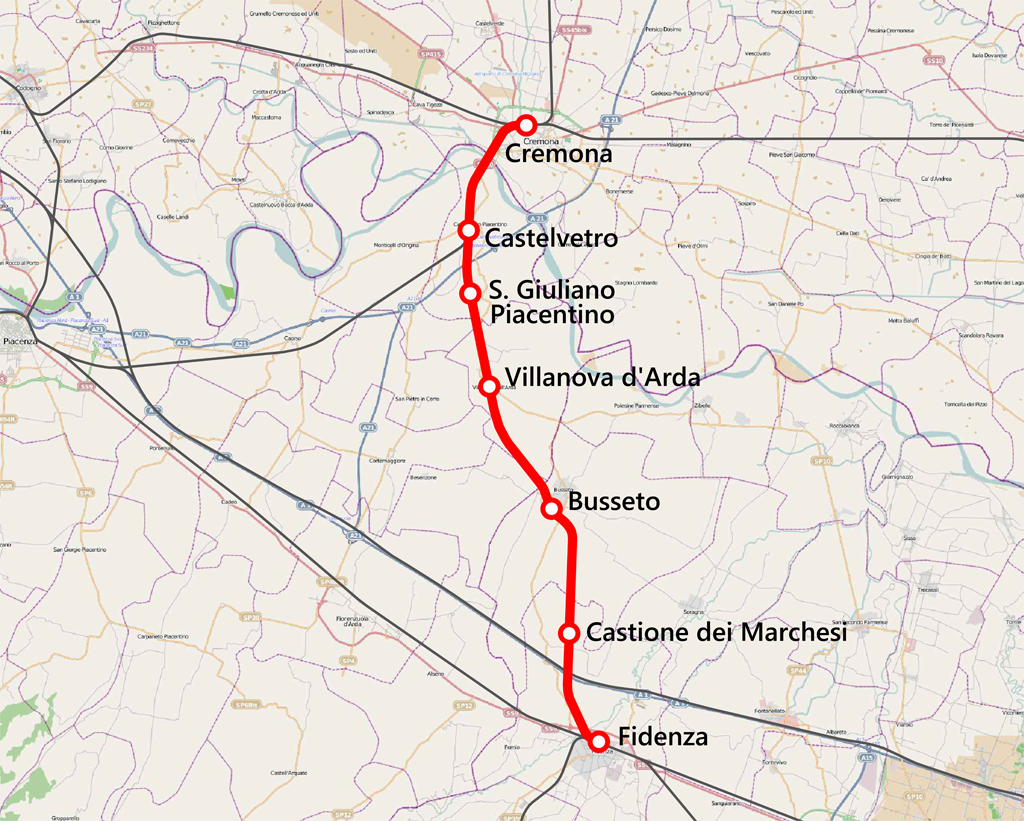

Overview
- Status: in use
- Owner: RFI
- Locale: Italy
- Termini: Cremona; Fidenza

Service
- Type: Heavy rail
- Operator(s): Trenitalia

History
- Opened: 1906

Technical
- Line length: 34 km (21 mi)
- Track gauge: 1,435 mm (4 ft 8 1/2 in) standard gauge
- Electrification: 3 kV DC

The Cremona–Fidenza railway is a railway line in Italy.

== History ==
The line was opened on 12 September 1906 and operated by the private railway company Società Italiana Ferrovie e Tramvie (SIFT). Later it came to the state company Ferrovie dello Stato (FS).

It was electrified at the end of the 1970s, in order to provide an alternative route (via Treviglio, Cremona and Fidenza) for the freight trains from Milan to the south. The electrical service started on 27 May 1979.

== See also ==
- List of railway lines in Italy

== Bibliography ==
- RFI – Fascicolo linea 30
