= Olginate =

- Comune
- Comune di Olginate
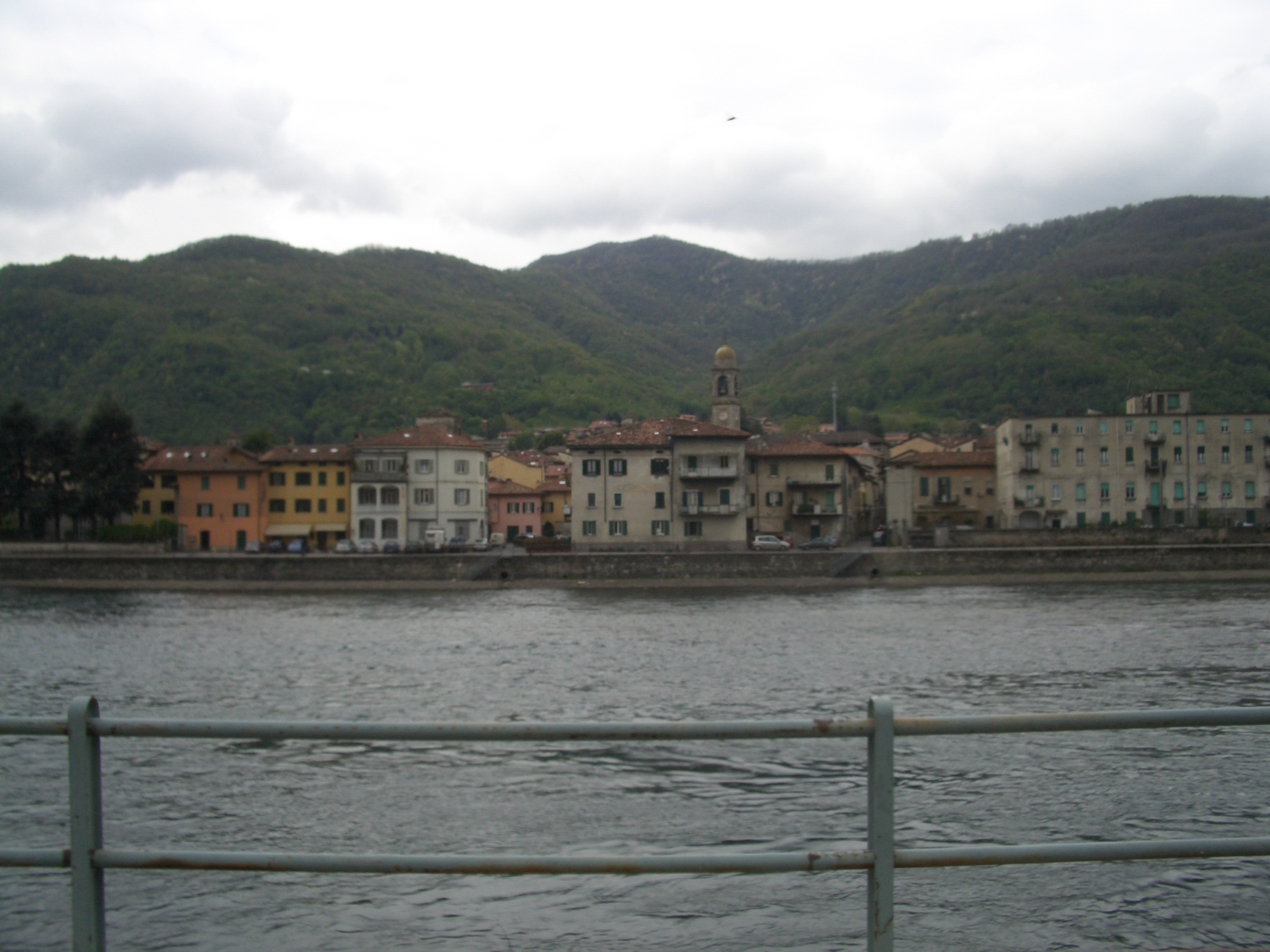

- Location within Italy Location within Lombardy
- Coordinates: 45°48′0″N 9°25′0″E
- Country: Italy
- Region: Lombardy
- Province: Province of Lecco (LC)
- Frazioni: Capiate, Consonno

Government
  - Mayor: Marco Passoni

Area
  - Total: 7.9 km^{2} (3.1 sq mi)
- Elevation: 200 m (660 ft)

Population (Oct. 2010)
  - Total: 7,200
  - Density: 910/km^{2} (2,400/sq mi)
- Demonym: Olginatesi
- Time zone: UTC+1 (CET)
  - Summer (DST): UTC+2 (CEST)
- Postal code: 23854
- Dialing code: 0341
- Patron saint: Saint Agnes
- Saint day: 21 January
- Website: Official website

Olginate (Brianzöö: Ulginàa) is a comune (municipality) in the Province of Lecco in the Italian region Lombardy, located about 40 kilometres (25 mi) northeast of Milan and about 6 kilometres (4 mi) south of Lecco. As of October 2010, it had a population of 7,200 and an area of 7.9 square kilometres (3.1 mi^{2}).

The municipality of Olginate contains the frazione (subdivision) Consonno.

Olginate borders the following municipalities: Airuno, Brivio, Calolziocorte, Galbiate, Garlate, Valgreghentino, Vercurago.

It is served by Calolziocorte-Olginate railway station.

== Demographic evolution ==
Historical population

Year	Pop.	±%
1861	2,086	—
1871	2,317	+11.1%
1881	2,581	+11.4%
1901	2,826	+9.5%
1911	3,098	+9.6%

Year	Pop.	±%
1921	3,227	+4.2%
1931	3,302	+2.3%
1936	3,391	+2.7%
1951	3,851	+13.6%
1961	4,111	+6.8%

Year	Pop.	±%
1971	5,199	+26.5%
1981	6,559	+26.2%
1991	6,635	+1.2%
2001	6,695	+0.9%
2010	7,200	+7.5%

Source: Data from ISTAT

== Administration ==
Period		Office holder	Party	Title	Notes
15 july 1988	7 june 1993	Italo Bruseghini	Partito Socialista Italiano	Mayor	
7 june 1993	28 april 1997	Italo Bruseghini	Ind.	Mayor	
28 april 1997	14 may 2001	Italo Bruseghini	Centro-sinistra/Lista civica	Mayor	
14 may 2001	30 may 2006	Miriam Cornara ┼	Lista civica	Mayor	
30 may 2006	1º june 2011	Antonio Gilardi	Lista civica	Mayor	
1º june 2011	5 june 2016	Rocco Briganti	Lista civica: Olginate 2000	Mayor	
5 june 2016	4 october 2021	Marco Passoni	Lista Civica: Olginate 2020	Mayor	
4 october 2021	attuale	Marco Passoni	Lista Civica: Olginate 2030	Mayor	
