= Carnate–Usmate railway station =

Railway station in Italy

Carnate–Usmate
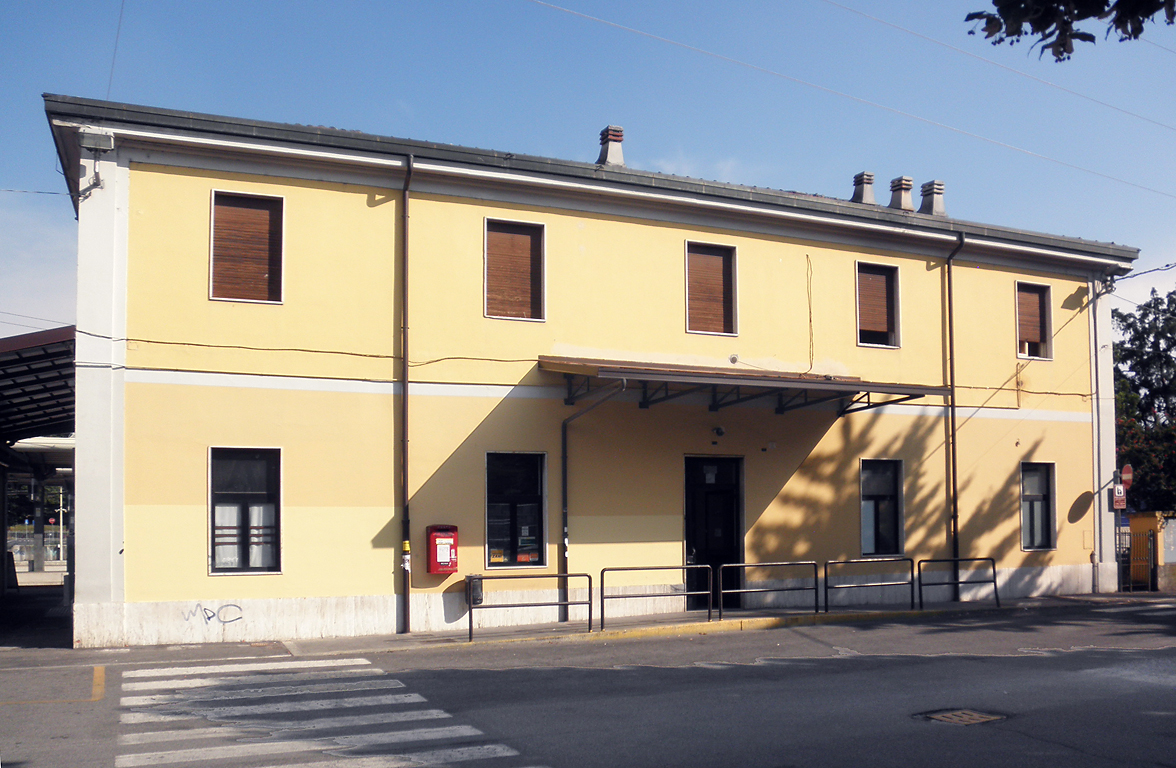

General information
- Location: Via Roma 2 Carnate, Monza and Brianza, Lombardy; Italy
- Coordinates: 45°39′11″N 09°22′30″E
- Operator: Rete Ferroviaria Italiana
- Lines: Lecco–Milan; Seregno–Bergamo
- Distance: 11.803 km (7.334 mi) from Monza; 17.920 km (11.135 mi) from Ponte San Pietro
- Tracks: 2
- Train operators: Trenord

Other information
- Fare zone: STIBM: Mi6
- Classification: Silver

History
- Opened: 27 December 1873; 152 years ago
- Electrified: ?

Services
Preceding station	Trenord	Following station
Arcore towards Milano Porta Garibaldi	Line S8 (Milan suburban railway service)	Osnago towards Lecco
Location
- Location within Lombardy Location within Northern Italy Location within Italy

Carnate–Usmate railway station is a railway station in Italy. It is located at the cross of the Lecco–Milan railway with the Seregno–Bergamo railway. It serves the municipalities of Carnate and Usmate Velate.

== Services ==
Carnate–Usmate is served by line S8 of the Milan suburban railway service, and by the Milan–Carnate–Bergamo and Carnate–Seregno regional lines, all operated by the Lombard railway company Trenord.

== Accidents and incidents ==
- On 19 August 2020, a train ran away from Paderno d'Adda and derailed at Carnate-Usmate. Three people were injured.

== See also ==
- Milan suburban railway service
