= List of railway lines in Italy =

This is a list of all railway lines in Italy.

== Active lines ==
=== Managed by Ferrovie dello Stato ===
==== High–speed lines ====
- Turin–Milan
- Milan–Verona (under construction)
- Verona–Venice (under construction)
- Venice–Trieste (planning phase)
- Milan–Bologna
- Bologna–Florence
- Florence–Rome
- Rome–Naples
- Naples–Salerno
- Tortona–Genoa (under construction)

==== Major lines ====
- Genoa–Pisa
- Ancona–Lecce
- Alessandria–Piacenza
- Bologna–Ancona
- Bologna–Florence
- Domodossola–Milan
- Florence–Pisa–Livorno
- Florence–Rome
- Gallarate–Laveno
- Genoa–Ventimiglia
- Milan–Bologna
- Milan–Chiasso
- Milan–Venice
- Milan–Genoa
- Naples–Foggia
- Naples–Salerno
- Parma–La Spezia
- Udine–Tarvisio
- Rome–Ancona
- Rome–Formia–Naples
- Rome–Cassino–Naples
- Rome–Livorno
- Salerno–Reggio Calabria
- Turin–Genoa
- Turin–Milan
- Turin–Modane
- Udine–Trieste
- Padua–Bologna
- Venice–Trieste
- Venice–Udine
- Verona–Bologna
- Verona–Brennero

==== Minor lines ====
- Alessandria–Cavallermaggiore
- Alessandria–Novara–Arona
- Alessandria–Ovada
- Alessandria–San Giuseppe di Cairo
- Aosta–Pré-Saint-Didier
- Asciano–Monte Antico
- Ascoli Piceno–San Benedetto del Tronto
- Asti–Genoa
- Avellino–Rocchetta Sant'Antonio
- Avezzano–Sora–Roccasecca
- Bari–Bitritto
- Bari–Taranto
- Barletta–Spinazzola
- Battipaglia–Potenza–Metaponto
- Benevento–Campobasso
- Bergamo–Brescia
- Biella–Novara
- Brescia–Cremona
- Cagliari–Golfo Aranci Marittima
- Calalzo–Padua
- Caltanissetta–Agrigento
- Campiglia Marittima–Piombino Marittima
- Campobasso–Termoli
- Cancello–Avellino
- Cancello–Benevento
- Carmagnola–Bra
- Casarsa–Portogruaro
- Castagnole–Asti–Mortara
- Castelbolognese–Ravenna
- Catania–Caltagirone–Gela
- Cecina–Volterra
- Ceva–Ormea
- Chivasso–Alessandria
- Chivasso–Asti
- Chivasso–Ivrea–Aosta
- Colico–Chiavenna
- Como–Lecco
- Cosenza–Sibari
- Cremona–Fidenza
- Cuneo–Limone–Ventimiglia
- Cuneo–Mondovì
- Decimomannu–Iglesias
- Civitanova Marche–Fabriano
- Empoli–Siena–Chiusi
- Faenza–Lavezzola
- Faenza–Ravenna
- Ferrandina–Matera
- Ferrara–Ravenna–Rimini
- Fidenza–Fornovo
- Fidenza–Salsomaggiore Terme
- Florence–Faenza
- Foggia–Manfredonia
- Foggia–Potenza
- Foligno–Terontola
- Franzensfeste–Innichen (Fortezza–San Candido)
- Gemona del Friuli–Pinzano
- Giulianova–Teramo
- Isernia–Campobasso
- Lamezia Terme–Catanzaro Lido
- Lecco–Bergamo
- Lecco–Milan
- Lucca–Aulla
- Lucca–Pisa
- Mantova–Monselice
- Messina–Syracuse
- Milan–Mortara
- Montebelluna–Camposampiero
- Monza–Molteno
- Novara–Gozzano–Domodossola
- Novara–Luino
- Novara–Varallo
- Ozieri Chilivani–Porto Torres Marittima
- Padova–Bassano
- Palermo–Agrigento–Porto Empedocle
- Palermo–Catania
- Palermo–Messina
- Palermo–Trapani
- Pavia–Alessandria
- Paola–Cosenza
- Parma–Brescia
- Pavia–Stradella
- Pavia–Mantua
- Pavia–Mortara–Vercelli
- Pergola–Fabriano
- Piacenza–Cremona
- Pisa–Collesalvetti–Vada
- Pistoia–Bologna
- Ponte nelle Alpi–Conegliano
- Porto Ceresio–Milan
- Rocchetta Sant'Antonio–Gioia del Colle
- Rome–Capranica–Viterbo
- Rome–Fiumicino
- Rome–Frascati
- Rome–Sulmona–Pescara
- Rovigo–Chioggia
- Sacile–Pinzano
- Salerno–Mercato San Severino
- Santhià–Arona
- Santhià–Biella
- Savigliano–Saluzzo–Cuneo
- Seregno–Bergamo
- Siena–Grosseto
- Siracusa–Canicattì
- Sulmona–Isernia
- Taranto–Brindisi
- Taranto–Reggio Calabria
- Terni–Sulmona
- Terracina–Priverno
- Tirano–Lecco
- Turin–Fossano–Savona
- Turin–Pinerolo
- Torre Annunziata–Castellammare di Stabia–Gragnano
- Tortona–Novi Ligure
- Trento–Venice
- Treviglio–Bergamo
- Treviglio–Cremona
- Treviso–Portogruaro
- Trofarello–Chieri
- Udine–Cervignano
- Vairano–Isernia
- Vercelli–Casale–Valenza
- Verona–Legnago–Rovigo
- Verona–Mantova–Modena
- Viareggio–Florence
- Vicenza–Schio
- Vicenza–Treviso
- Villamassargia–Carbonia
- Viterbo–Attigliano

=== Managed by other companies ===
==== Standard gauge ====
===== Managed by Gruppo Torinese Trasporti =====
- Settimo Torinese–Pont Canavese
- Turin–Chieri
- Turin–Ceres railway

===== Managed by Ferrovie Nord Milano =====
- Brescia–Iseo–Edolo
- Milan–Saronno
- Milan–Canzo–Asso
- Saronno–Como
- Novara–Seregno
- Saronno–Varese–Laveno

===== Managed by SAD =====
- Val Venosta

===== Managed by Sistemi Territoriali =====
- Adria–Mestre

===== Managed by Società Ferrovie Udine–Cividale =====
- Udine–Cividale

===== Managed by Ferrovie Emilia Romagna =====
- Bologna–Portomaggiore
- Casalecchio–Vignola
- Ferrara–Codigoro
- Modena–Sassuolo
- Parma–Suzzara
- Reggio Emilia–Ciano d'Enza
- Reggio Emilia–Guastalla
- Reggio Emilia–Sassuolo
- Suzzara–Ferrara

===== Managed by Umbria Mobilità =====
- Terni–Perugia–Sansepolcro

===== Managed by La ria Italiana =====
- Casentinese
- Arezzo–Sinalunga

===== Managed by ATAC =====
- Rome–Civitacastellana–Viterbo
- Rome–Lido

===== Managed by Adriatico Sangritana =====
- Sangritana

===== Managed by Ente Autonomo Volturno =====
- Naples–Piedimonte Matese
- Benevento–Cancello
- Naples–Pozzuoli–Torregaveta
- Naples–Licola–Torregaveta

===== Managed by Ferrovie del Gargano =====
- Foggia–Lucera
- San Severo–Peschici

===== Managed by Ferrotramviaria =====
- Bari–Barletta

===== Managed by Ferrovie del Sud Est =====
- Bari–Casamassima–Putignano
- Bari–Martina Franca–Taranto
- Gallipoli–Casarano
- Lecce–Otranto
- Maglie–Gagliano
- Martina Franca–Lecce
- Novoli–Gagliano
- Zollino–Gallipoli

==== Narrow gauge ====
===== Managed by Ferrovie Appulo Lucane =====
- Bari–Matera–Montalbano Jonico
- Altamura–Potenza
- Avigliano–Avigliano Città

===== Managed by FCE =====
- Circumetnea

===== Managed by EAV =====
- Circumvesuviana:
  - Naples–Pompei–Poggiomarino
  - Naples–Ottaviano–Sarno
  - Naples–Nola–Baiano
  - Torre Annunziata–Sorrento
  - Pomigliano d'Arco–Acerra
  - Botteghelle–San Giorgio a Cremano

===== Managed by Ferrovie della Calabria =====
- Cosenza–Catanzaro Lido
- Cosenza–Camigliatello Silano (currently inactive)
- Gioia Tauro–Cinquefrondi (currently inactive)
- Gioia Tauro–Palmi (currently inactive)

===== Managed by ARST =====
- Macomer–Nuoro
- Monserrato–Isili
- Sassari–Alghero
- Sassari–Sorso

===== Managed by AMT Genova =====
- Genova–Casella
- Principe–Granarolo

===== Managed by ATAC =====
- Rome–Giardinetti

===== Managed by SAD =====
- del Renon

===== Managed by SSIF =====
- Domodossola–Locarno

===== Managed by Trentino Trasporti =====
- Trento–Malé–Mezzana

=== Lines used exclusively for urban services ===
- Rome Metro
- Milan Metro
- Naples Metro
- Turin Metro
- Genoa Metro
- Bari Metro
- Catania Metro
- Brescia Metro
- Cosenza Metro (in planning phase)
- Catanzaro Metro (under construction and renovation)

=== Touristic lines ===
- FTI – Ferrovie Turistiche Italiane
- Ferrovie della Sardegna–Trenino Verde
- Ferrovie della Calabria–Trenino della Sila
- Fondazione FS

== Inactive lines ==
=== Decommissioned ===
==== Previously managed by Ferrovie dello Stato ====
- Agrigento–Naro–Licata
- Airasca–Saluzzo
- Albano–Nettuno
- Alcantara–Randazzo
- Asciano–Monte Antico
- Avenza–Carrara
- Bastia Mondovì–Mondovì
- Bivio Mirano–Bivio Carpenedo
- Bricherasio–Barge
- Brunico–Campo Tures
- Busca–Dronero
- Castelvetrano–Porto Empedocle
- Cava Carbonara–Cava Manara
- Cerignola Campagna–Cerignola Città
- Cervignano–Aquileia–Pontile per Grado
- Chiusa–Plan
- Como–Varese
- Cuneo–Boves–Borgo San Dalmazzo
- Desenzano–Desenzano Porto
- Dittaino–Leonforte
- Dittaino–Piazza Armerina–Caltagirone
- Ellera–Tavernelle
- Fano–Urbino
- Gemona del Friuli–Casarsa
- Lercara–Filaga–Magazzolo
- Lonigo–Lonigo Città
- Lucca–Pontedera
- Margherita di Savoia Ofantino–Margherita di Savoia
- Mezzocorona–Mezzolombardo
- Montebelluna–Susegana
- Moretta–Cavallermaggiore
- Motta Sant'Anastasia–Regalbuto
- Noto–Pachino
- Palazzolo–Paratico
- Palermo–Corleone–San Carlo
- Palo–Ladispoli
- Palmanova–San Giorgio di Nogaro
- Pisa Centrale–Pisa Aeroporto
- Poggibonsi–Colle Val d'Elsa
- Rezzato–Vobarno
- Rome San Pietro–Vigna Clara
- Rovereto–Arco–Riva
- San Giovanni Suergiu–Iglesias
- Sangritana
- San Vito al Tagliamento–Motta di Livenza
- Santa Ninfa–Salemi
- Sparanise–Gaeta
- Spinazzola–Spinazzola Città
- Urbino–Fabriano
- Velletri–Segni
- Velletri–Terracina
- Tarvisio–Lubiana
- Treviso–Ostiglia
- Trieste–Buie–Parenzo
- Trieste–Erpelle
- Trieste Campo Marzio Smistamento–Trieste Centrale Scalo

==== Previously managed by other companies ====
- Turin Monorail
- Adria–Ariano Polesine
- Agnone–Pescolanciano
- Arezzo–Fossato di Vico
- Atena Lucana–Marsico Nuovo
- Bagnolo in Piano–Carpi
- Barco–Montecchio
- Bari–Matera–Montalbano Jonico
- Bergamo–Clusone
- Bergamo–Piazza Brembana
- Biella–Balma
- Biella–Cossato–Vallemosso
- Biella–Mongrando
- Bitonto–Santo Spirito
- Bribano–Agordo
- Bolzano–Caldaro
- Budrio–Massalombarda
- Calalzo–Dobbiaco
- Cana–Arcille–Grosseto
- Cana–Arcille–Rispescia
- Carnia–Tolmezzo–Villa Santina
- Castel Bolognese–Riolo Bagni
- Castelraimondo–Camerino
- Castellanza–Mendrisio
- Chieti città–Chieti stazione
- Cividale–Caporetto
- Cividale–Tarcetta
- Cogne–Acque Fredde
- Cremona–Iseo
- Crotone–Petilia Policastro
- Crotone–Timpa Grande
- Milan Expo Railway
- Ferrara–Copparo
- Ferrara–Modena
- Frugarolo–Basaluzzo
- Gairo Taquisara–Jerzu
- decauville Gariglione–Differenze
- Genova Terralba–Acciaieria Falck
- Ghirla–Ponte Tresa
- Gioiosa Jonica–Mammola
- Gozzano–Alzo
- Grignasco–Coggiola
- Intra–Premeno
- Isili–Villacidro
- L'Aquila–Capitignano
- La Spezia Centrale–Arsenale
- La Thuile–Arpy
- Lagonegro–Castrovillari–Spezzano Albanese
- Lana di Sopra–Postal
- Macomer–Bosa
- Mandela–Subiaco
- Mantova–Peschiera
- Marmifera Privata di Carrara
- Massa Marittima–Follonica
- Massalombarda–Imola–Fontanelice
- Menaggio–Porlezza
- Modena–Mirandola
- Modena–Vignola
- Monteponi–Portovesme
- Montepulciano–Fontago
- di Monterufoli
- Montevecchio Sciria–San Gavino Monreale
- Monti–Tempio
- Macomer–Nuoro
- Ora–Predazzo
- Orbetello–Porto Santo Stefano
- Padova–Piazzola–Carmignano
- Pescara–Penne
- Piacenza–Bettola
- Pisa–Tirrenia–Livorno
- Ponte Tresa–Luino
- Porto San Giorgio–Amandola
- Portomaggiore–Bando
- Potenza–Pignola–Laurenzana
- Pracchia–San Marcello Pistoiese–Mammiano
- Precenicco–Gemona del Friuli
- Pugliano–Vesuvio
- Rocchette–Arsiero
- Rocchette–Asiago
- Rome–Fiuggi–Alatri–Frosinone
- Reggio Emilia–Boretto
- Rimini–Novafeltria
- Rimini–San Marino
- Sacile–Vittorio Veneto
- Sant'Ellero–Saltino
- Sassari–Alghero
- Schio–Rocchette
- mineraria Sikelia
- Siliqua–San Giovanni Suergiu–Calasetta
- Siracusa–Ragusa–Vizzini
- Soverato–Chiaravalle Centrale
- Spezzano–Zoccalia
- Spoleto–Norcia
- Stresa–Mottarone
- Susa–Saint–Michel–de–Maurienne
- Thiene–Rocchette
- Tirso–Chilivani
- Tolmezzo–Paluzza–Moscardo
- Torrebelvicino–Schio
- Tortona–Castelnuovo Scrivia
- Varese–Luino
- Verona–Caprino–Garda
- Vibo Valentia–Mileto
- Villa Santina–Comeglians
- Villamar–Ales
- Voghera–Varzi

=== Unused ===
==== Managed by Ferrovie dello Stato ====
- Civitavecchia–Orte
- Santo Stefano di Magra–Sarzana
- Sulmona–Isernia

==== Managed by other companies ====
- Gioia Tauro–Cinquefrondi

=== Unfinished or never put in use ===
- Bertiolo–Palmanova–Savogna
- Bivio Orba–Felizzano
- Bronte–Cuccovia
- Canicattì–Caltagirone
- Cormons–Redipuglia
- Ferrandina–Matera
- Formigine–Pavullo
- Kaggera–Salemi
- Leonforte–Nicosia
- Palermo Lolli–Camporeale–Salaparuta
- Rolo–Mirandola
- Rome Nomentana–Rome San Pietro
- Santo Stefano di Camastra–Mistretta
- Santarcangelo di Romagna–Urbino
- Teglio Veneto–Bertiolo–Udine
- Torpignattara–Piazza Santa Croce
- Udine–Castions
- Udine–Majano
- Vigna Clara–Rome Smistamento
