= Chiavenna railway station =

Railway station in Italy

Chiavenna
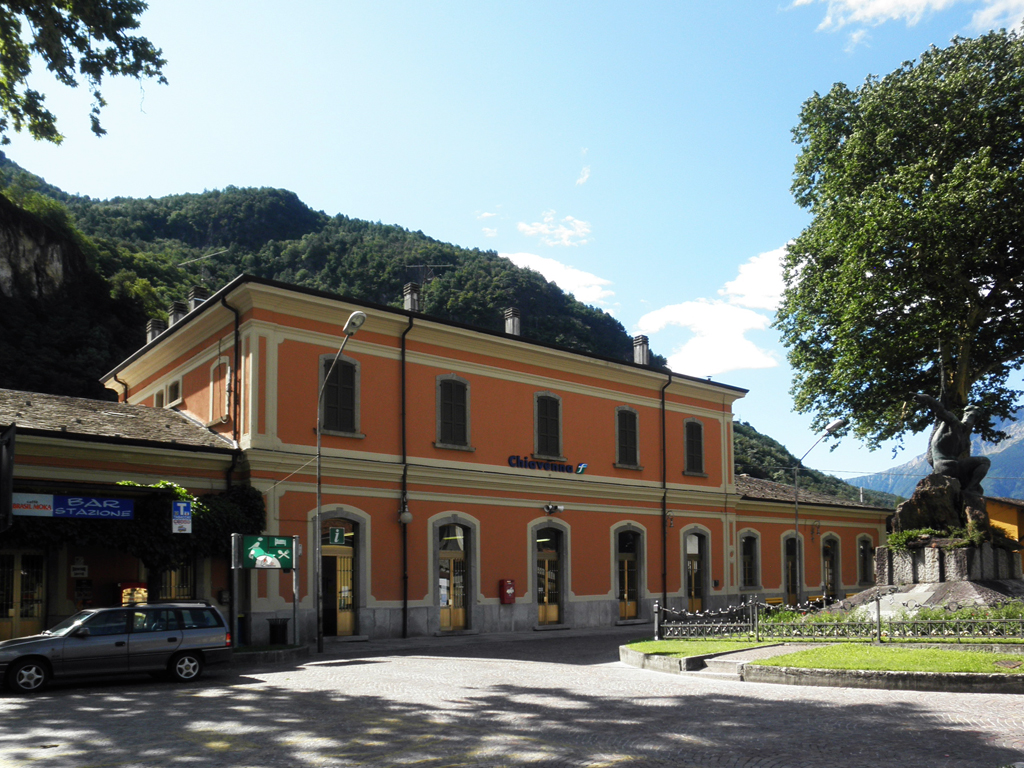

General information
- Location: Chiavenna, Sondrio, Lombardy; Italy
- Coordinates: 46.3196°N 9.40507°E
- Owner: Rete Ferroviaria Italiana
- Operator: Trenord
- Line: Colico-Chiavenna
- Platforms: 2
- Tracks: 1

Construction
- Architect: classic

Other information
- Classification: silver

History
- Opened: 1892; 134 years ago
- Electrified: 1886
Location
- Location within Lombardy Location within Northern Italy Location within Italy

Chiavenna railway station is a railway station in Italy. Located at the end of Colico–Chiavenna railway, with trains from and to Milano Porta Garibaldi and Colico railway station, it serves the town of Chiavenna.

== Services ==
Chiavenna is served by the Lombard railway company Trenord.
