= Colico–Chiavenna railway =

Railway line in Lombardy, Italy

Overview
- Native name: Ferrovia Colico-Chiavenna
- Status: In use
- Locale: Lombardy, Italy
- Termini: Colico railway station; Chiavenna railway station
- Stations: 8

Service
- Type: Heavy rail
- Services: R11
- Operator(s): Trenord

History
- Opened: 9 September 1886

Technical
- Line length: 26 km (16 mi)
- Number of tracks: 1
- Track gauge: 1,435 mm (4 ft 8 1/2 in) standard gauge
- Electrification: 3 kV DC overhead line

The Colico–Chiavenna railway is a rail line in Lombardy, Italy, opened on 9 September 1886.

The line was originally part of an unsuccessful project for a Milan–Chur railway that planned to pass through a tunnel at Splugen. However, this project was canceled following the successful completion of the line through the Gotthard tunnel.

== See also ==
- List of railway lines in Italy
