= Lecco railway station =

Railway station in Lecco, Italy

Lecco
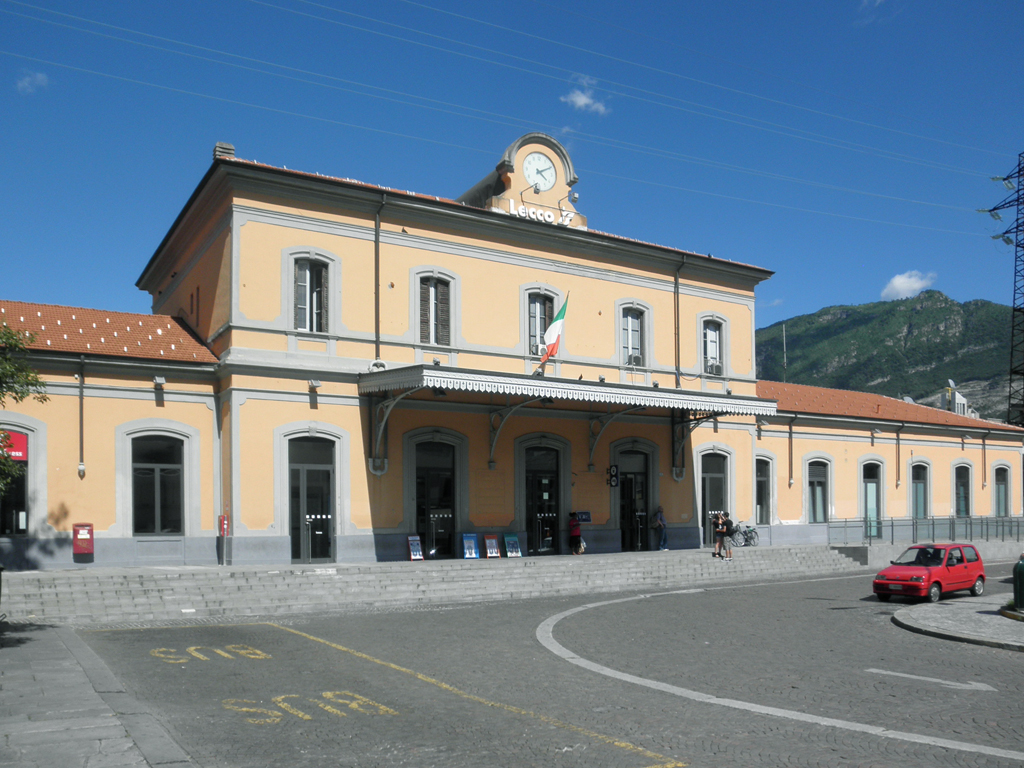

General information
- Location: Piazza Lega Lombarda; 23900 Lecco; Lecco, Lecco, Lombardy; Italy
- Coordinates: 45°51′23″N 09°23′36″E
- Operator: Rete Ferroviaria Italiana; Centostazioni
- Lines: Como–Lecco; Monza–Molteno–Lecco; Tirano–Lecco; Lecco–Bergamo; Lecco–Milan
- Distance: 32.933 km (20.464 mi) from Bergamo
- Train operators: Trenord
- Connections: Suburban buses

Other information
- Classification: Gold

History
- Opened: 4 November 1863; 162 years ago

Services
Preceding station	Trenord	Following station
Valmadrera towards Milano Porta Garibaldi	Line S7 (Milan suburban railway service)	Terminus
Lecco Maggianico towards Milano Porta Garibaldi	Line S8 (Milan suburban railway service)	Terminus
Location
- Location within Lombardy Location within Northern Italy Location within Italy

Lecco railway station (Italian: Stazione di Lecco) is the main station serving the town and comune of Lecco, in the region of Lombardy, northern Italy. Opened in 1863, it is the junction of five lines, namely to Bergamo, to Como, to Milan, to Molteno and Monza and to Tirano.

The station is currently managed by Rete Ferroviaria Italiana (RFI). However, the commercial area of the passenger building is managed by Centostazioni. Each of these companies is a subsidiary of Ferrovie dello Stato (FS), Italy's state-owned rail company.

Train services are operated by regional railway company Trenord.

== Location ==
Lecco railway station is situated in Piazza Lega Lombarda, at the northeastern edge of the town centre.

== History ==
The station was opened on 4 November 1863, upon the inauguration of the Lecco–Calolziocorte section of the Lecco–Bergamo railway.

== Features ==
The passenger building is made up of three sections. The main one (where there are guest services for travellers and the local station master) is on two floors, while the other two sections are single storey.

Next to the passenger building is a small one-storey structure that houses the public conveniences.

The station yard is composed of five through tracks, with platforms connected by two pedestrian underpasses. There is also a dock platform that can accommodate trains from the south, and a track leading to the goods yard.

In the goods yard, there is a goods shed. The tracks in the goods yard have been dismantled, and the goods shed converted to storage. The architecture of the goods shed is very similar to that of other Italian railway stations.

All buildings at the station are rectangular in layout.

In 2009, work was completed on a facelift of the station co-financed by Centostazioni and RFI. The renovations altered the configuration of the spaces within the passenger building, by creating a new central area (lobby) and side aisles. The renovation work also involved the installation of a new lighting system and other new technology equipment, the removal of architectural barriers such as the elimination of steps and the extension of the ramps, the upgrading of public conveniences and the renovation of the exterior facade of the building with new plaster and a new lighting system that enhances its appearance at night.

In the course of the renovation work, a new secondary entrance was created from Via Balicco, the road parallel to the tracks. The intent of that alteration was to improve public access to the station, especially for travellers who reside in the upper part of the city.

== Passenger and train movements ==
Lecco railway station has about seven million passenger movements each year.

The station is served by regional and suburban trains. The main destinations of the regional trains are Como, Bergamo, Milano Centrale and Sondrio. The station is a terminus of line S8 of the Milan suburban railway service (Milano Porta Garibaldi–Monza–Carnate–Lecco; hourly) and of the new line S7 (Milano Porta Garibaldi–Monza–Molteno–Lecco).

A total of about 154 trains call at the station daily, and their main destinations are Monza, Sondrio, Tirano and Milan.

== Interchange ==
In front of the passenger building is a taxi stand, and a stop for suburban buses, which link the station with the rest of the province via a bus station in Valsassina.

== See also ==
- History of rail transport in Italy
- List of railway stations in Lombardy
- Rail transport in Italy
- Railway stations in Italy
