= Pavia–Mantua railway =

Railway line in Italy

Overview
- Status: in use
- Owner: RFI
- Line number: 34
- Locale: Lombardy, Italy
- Termini: Pavia; Mantua

Service
- Type: Heavy rail
- Operator(s): Trenord

History
- Opened: 1874

Technical
- Line length: 136 km (85 mi)
- Track gauge: 1,435 mm (4 ft 8 1/2 in) standard gauge
- Electrification: 3 kV DC (from Codogno to Mantua)

Pavia–Mantua railway is a railway line in Lombardy, Italy.

== History ==
The section from Pavia to Cremona was opened on 15 December 1866. The section from Cremona to Mantua was opened after the Second Italian War of Independence in 1874.

== See also ==
- List of railway lines in Italy
