= Piacenza–Cremona railway =

Railway line in Italy

Overview
- Status: in use for freight trains
- Locale: Italy
- Termini: Piacenza; Cremona

Service
- Type: Heavy rail

History
- Opened: 1933

Technical
- Line length: 31 km (19 mi)
- Track gauge: 1,435 mm (4 ft 8 1/2 in) standard gauge
- Electrification: 3 kV DC

The Piacenza–Cremona railway is a railway line in Italy.

On 12 December 2013 passenger service on the line was terminated, and was substituted by 2 buses for the connection between Piacenza and Cremona. Since then, the line is only used by freight trains.

== See also ==
- List of railway lines in Italy
- Cremona–Ostiano Tramway
