= Giovanni Bertacchi =

Italian poet, teacher and literary critic

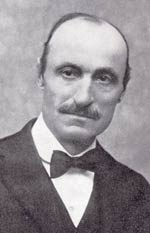
- Giovanni Bertacchi ca. 1925.
- Born: 9 February 1869; Chiavenna
- Died: 24 November 1942 (aged 73); Milan
- Resting place: Cemetery of Chiavenna

Giovanni Bertacchi (9 February 1869 – 24 November 1942) was an Italian poet, teacher and literary critic.

== Biography ==
His poetry was heavily influenced by Giovanni Pascoli, both in terms of the search for metric forms and the characteristic taste for landscape descriptions.

He was a professor of Italian literature at the University of Padua from 1916 to 1938 when he voluntarily left the teaching position against fascism.

He was the author of critical studies on Dante, Leopardi, Manzoni, Alfieri, Mazzini. His first and perhaps most important poetic work is the Canzoniere delle Alpi, published in 1895. About 60 years, in conjunction with the release of his latest collection Il perenne domani (The Perennial Tomorrow). These were pervaded by the nostalgia for childhood and for its places of origin.

He was buried in the cemetery of Chiavenna, a sarcophagus created by Enrico Pancera.

== Main works ==
=== Critical studies ===
- Ore dantesche (1914)
- Leopardi un maestro di vita (1917) - Leopards a Master of Life
- Il primo romanticismo lombardo (1920) - The first Lombard romance
- Il pensiero critico e le tragedie di A. Manzoni (1936) - The critical thought and tragedies of A. Manzoni

=== Verse stories ===
- Il canzoniere delle Alpi, Milano, Chiesa e Guindani (1895) - The songwriter of the Alps, Milan, Church and Guindani
- Poemetti lirici, Milano, Sonzogno (1898) - Poetry lyric, Milan, Sonzogno
- Le malie del passato, Milano, Libreria editrice lombarda, (1905) - The Mountains of the Past, Milan, Lombard Publishing House
- Alle sorgenti, Milano, Baldini e Castoldi, (1906) - At the sources, Milan, Baldini & Castoldi
- A fior di silenzio, Milano, Baldini e Castoldi (1912) - A silent flower, Milan, Baldini and Castoldi
- Riflessi di orizzonti, Milano, Baldini e Castoldi, (1921) - Reflections of horizons, Milan, Baldini and Castoldi
- Il perenne domani, Milano, Baldini e Castoldi, (1929) -

=== Other works ===
- Suona la sveglia (1921), inno ufficiale del Corpo nazionale giovani esploratori ed esploratrici italiani
- Marmi, vessilli ed eroi (orazioni, commemorazioni, ecc.), Milano, Baldini e Castoldi (1912)
- Voci dal mondo: antologia della lingua italiana, Torino, Paravia, 1926.

== Notes ==
- Mario Borsa, Giovanni Bertacchi negli anni della sua giovinezza, Varese, 1943.
- Luigi Medici, Giovanni Bertacchi, maestro di bontà, Milano, Baldini e Castoldi, 1946.
- Arturo Graf, Anime di poeti, in «Nuova Antologia», Torino, 1º aprile 1904.
- Emilio Cecchi, Studi critici, Ancona, 1912.
- Giovanni Papini, Testimonianze, Firenze, Vallecchi, 1924, pp. 55–70.
- Alfredo Galletti, Il Novecento, Milano, Vallardi, 1939, pp. 256–260.
- Francesco Flora, I nostri morti, in «Corriere d'informazione», Milano, 20 novembre 1945.
- Enrico Maria Fusco, La lirica, Milano, Vallardi, 1950, volume 2°, pp. 297–300.
- Ettore Mazzoli, Giovanni Bertacchi, in Letteratura italiana - I Minori, volume 4°, Milano, Marzorati, 1962, pp. 3427–3439
- Luisa Mangoni, Giovanni Bertacchi, « Dizionario Biografico degli Italiani », vol. 9, Roma, Istituto dell'Enciclopedia italiana, 1967
- Dizionario della letteratura italiana a cura di Ettore Bonora, Milano, Rizzoli, I, 1977
