= Lecco–Bergamo railway =

Railway line in Italy

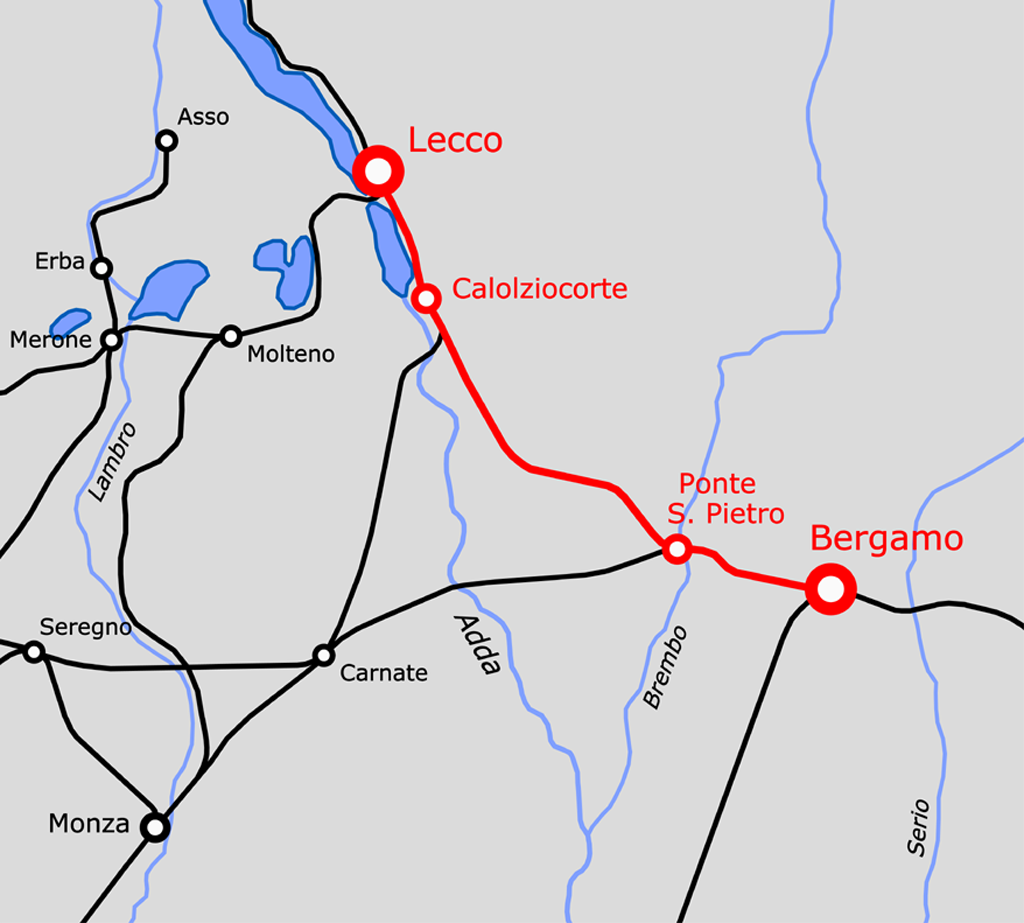

Overview
- Status: in use
- Owner: RFI
- Locale: Lombardy, Italy
- Termini: Lecco; Bergamo
- Stations: 9

Service
- Type: heavy rail
- Services: R7
- Route number: 185
- Operator(s): Trenord

History
- Opened: 1863

Technical
- Line length: 33 km (21 mi)
- Number of tracks: 1
- Track gauge: 1,435 mm (4 ft 8 1/2 in) standard gauge
- Electrification: 3 kV DC overhead line

The Lecco–Bergamo railway is a railway line in Lombardy, Italy. The railway infrastructure is managed by the Rete Ferroviaria Italiana, which classifies it as one of its complementary lines. The passenger service is operated by Trenord as a regional service.

== History ==
The railway from Lecco to Bergamo was built by the Società delle Strade Ferrate della Lombardia e dell'Italia Centrale (Lombardy and Central Italy Railway Company) and opened on 4 November 1863.

The section from Lecco to Calolziocorte has also been used by the Lecco–Milan railway since 1873. The Bergamo–Ponte San Pietro section has also used been by the Seregno-Bergamo line since the completion of the Carnate–Ponte San Pietro section in 1889.

In 2015, the Province of Bergamo, the region of Lombardy and some local parliamentarians requested and obtained government funding for the doubling of the section between Ponte San Pietro and Montello, the building of the new Bergamo Ospedale station at the Papa Giovanni XXIII hospital and a suburban service between the two Bergamo stations.

== Standards ==
The line is 1,435 mm (4 ft 8 1/2 in) standard gauge and single-track line, except on the Lecco–Calolziocorte section, which is shared with the Monza–Lecco railway and is duplicated. It is entirely electrified at 3000 volts DC and it is signalled locally.

== Rail traffic ==
Traffic is made up exclusively of Trenord regional services running between Lecco and Bergamo, stopping at all stations except Lecco Maggianico. Vercurago-San Girolamo is served only by some services.

The service includes a train every hour throughout the day, present both on weekdays and on holidays.

In addition to the trains departing from Lecco at 6.30 and 7.02 and from Bergamo at 6.08 and 7.00, the timetable includes departure at 12 minutes past the hour from Lecco between 8 a.m. to 9 p.m. and at 8 minutes past the hour from Bergamo from 8 a.m. to 9 p.m. Train normally cross in Cisano-Caprino Bergamasco.

== See also ==
- List of railway lines in Italy
