= Paderno d'Adda =

- Comune
- Comune di Paderno d'Adda
- Church of the Assumption

- Coat of arms

- Location within Italy Location within Lombardy
- Coordinates: 45°41′N 09°27′E
- Country: Italy
- Region: Lombardy
- Province: Lecco (LC)

Government
  - Mayor: Renzo Rotta (since May 26, 2014) (Vivere la Piazza)

Area
  - Total: 3 km^{2} (1.2 sq mi)
- Elevation: 266 m (873 ft)

Population (2011)
  - Total: 3,936
  - Density: 1,300/km^{2} (3,400/sq mi)
- Demonym: Padernesi
- Time zone: UTC+1 (CET)
  - Summer (DST): UTC+2 (CEST)
- Postal code: 23877
- Dialing code: 039
- Patron saint: Santa Maria Assunta
- Saint day: August 15
- Website: Official website

Paderno d'Adda (Brianzöö: Padèrnu; Bergamasque: Padéren) is a town and comune in the province of Lecco, in Lombardy. It is well known in the rest of Italy for the cast-iron San Michele Bridge built in the late nineteenth century following the Tour Eiffel style. It is said that Leonardo da Vinci used the Paderno's scenery as base for his famous painting Virgin of the Rocks.
