= Tirano railway station (RFI) =

Railway station in Italy

Tirano
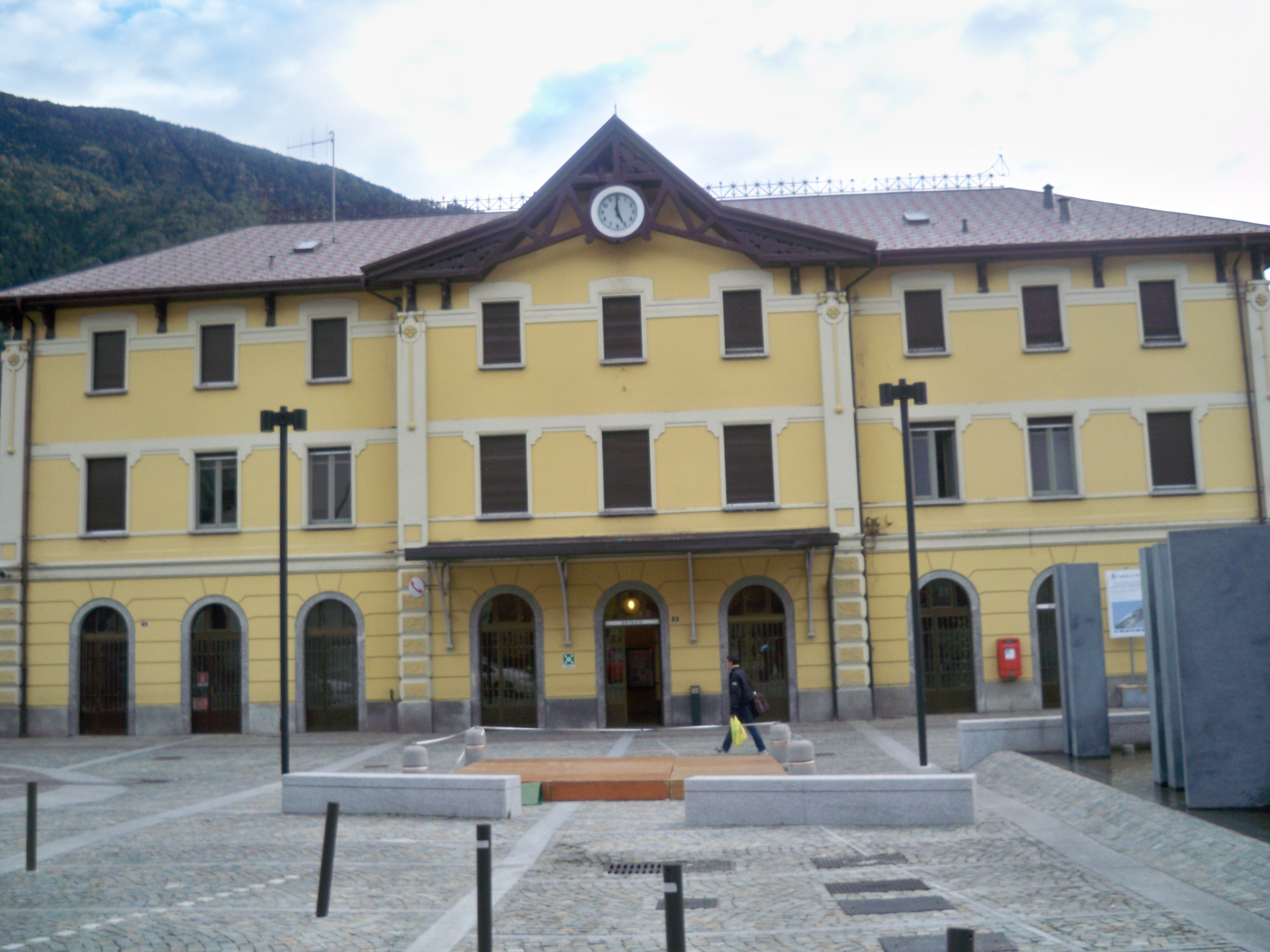
- The Tirano station building (RFI)

General information
- Location: Piazzale Stazione; Tirano, Sondrio, Lombardia; Italy
- Coordinates: 46°12′55″N 10°10′04″E
- Elevation: 429 m (1,407 ft)
- Operator: Rete Ferroviaria Italiana
- Line: Tirano–Lecco
- Distance: 26 km (16 mi) from Sondrio
- Train operators: Trenord
- Connections: Tirano Swiss station

Other information
- Classification: Silver

History
- Opened: 29 June 1902; 124 years ago
Location
- Location within Lombardy Location within Northern Italy Location within Italy

Tirano railway station (RFI) is one of two railway stations within the town and comune of Tirano, in the region of Lombardy, northern Italy. Opened in 1902, it is the terminus of the Tirano–Lecco railway.

The station is currently managed by Rete Ferroviaria Italiana (RFI). Train services are operated by the Lombard railway company Trenord.

== Location ==
Tirano (RFI) is situated at the southern side of Piazzale Stazione (Station Square) within the town centre. Tirano's other railway station, Tirano (RhB), is located at the next building on the left and at the western side of the same square.

== History ==
The station was opened on 29 June 1902, upon the inauguration of the Alta Valtellina (Upper Tellina Valley) railway. It was operated initially by the Società Ferrovia Alta Valtellina (FAV) (English: Alta Valtellina Railway Company).

Upon nationalisation of the Italian railways on 1 July 1905, the Alta Valtellina line remained in private ownership. The Ferrovie della Stato (FS), Italy's state-owned railway operator, did not assume ownership of the line until 1970.

== Architecture ==
The ground floor of the passenger building has various services, including a waiting room, ticket office and Trenord Cargo office. From the waiting room, there is access to the upper floors and the now abandoned and unused dormitory rooms.

== Train services ==
The following train services call at this station (incomplete):

Domestic

- Regional Train (Trenord Regional): Tirano - Sondrio - Lecco - Milan (Centrale)

Cross-border

All cross-border trains are operated by the Rhaetian Railway on metre-gauge tracks. Trains use the adjacent Tirano (RhB) station.

== Features ==
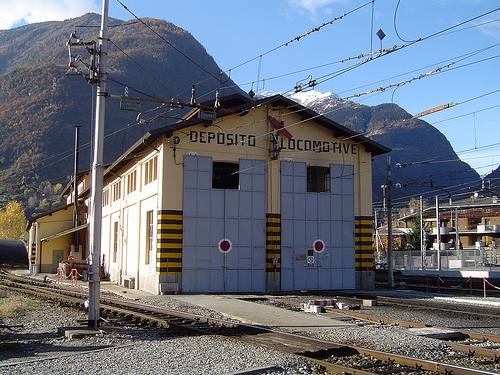
The locomotive shed.

The station has three passenger platforms.

From track 2 and track 3, there is access to the goods yard, which has 5 tracks for loading, unloading and storage of rolling stock plus another two for shunting (switching).

There is also an area used by rail heritage group ALe 883 for restoring locomotives.

== See also ==
- Rhaetian Railway
- History of rail transport in Italy
- List of railway stations in Lombardy
- Rail transport in Italy
- Railway stations in Italy
