= Bergamo railway station =

Railway station in Italy

Bergamo
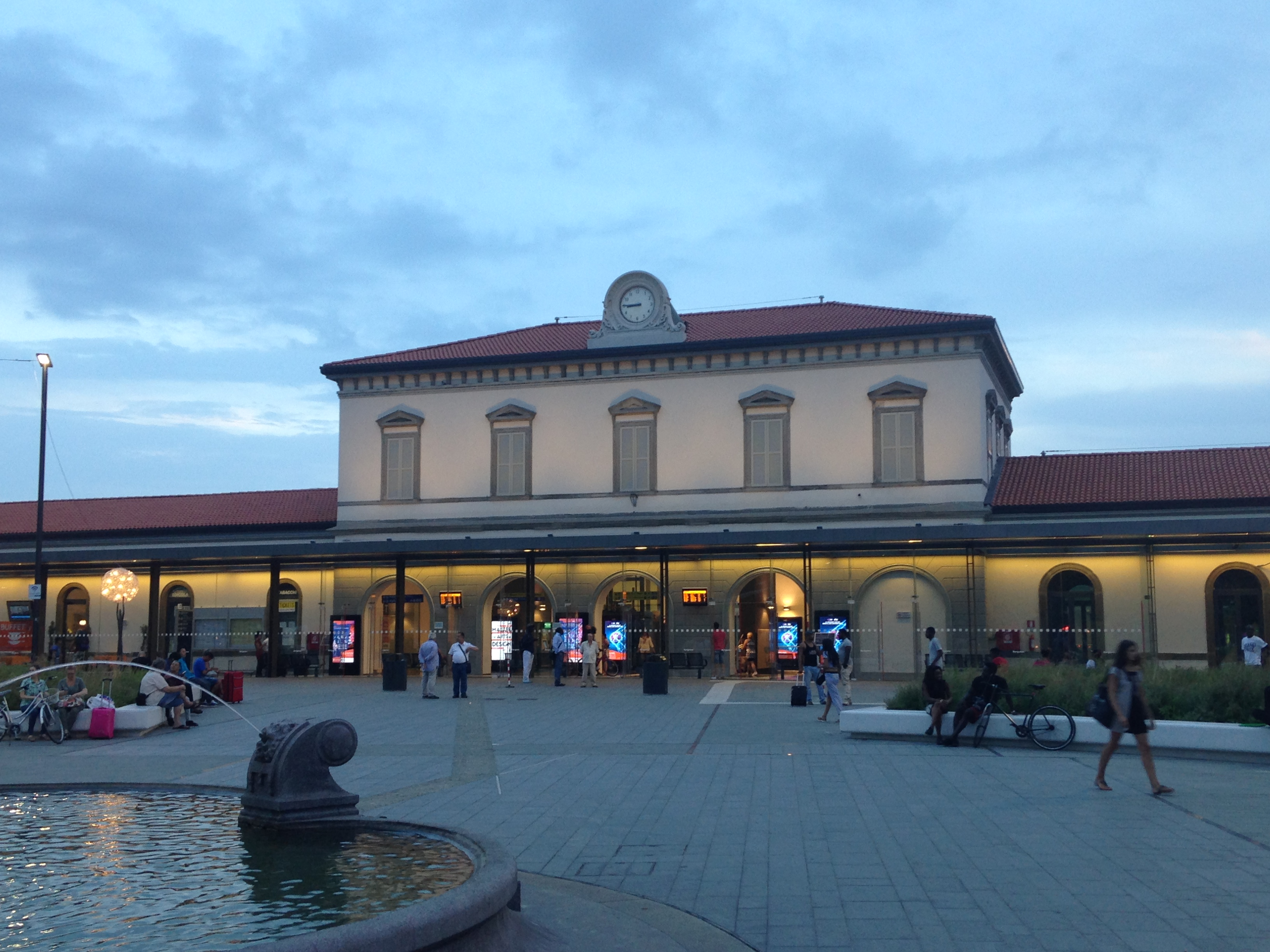
- The passenger building.

General information
- Location: Piazza Guglielmo Marconi; 24122 Bergamo BG; Bergamo, Bergamo, Lombardy; Italy
- Coordinates: 45°41′26″N 09°40′30″E
- Operator: Rete Ferroviaria Italiana; Centostazioni
- Lines: Bergamo–Brescia; Lecco–Bergamo; Seregno–Bergamo; Treviglio–Bergamo
- Distance: 21.882 km (13.597 mi) from Treviglio
- Train operators: Trenord
- Connections: Bergamo-Albino tramway; Urban and suburban buses

Other information
- Classification: Gold

History
- Opened: 22 April 1854; 172 years ago
Location
- Location within Lombardy Location within Northern Italy Location within Italy

Bergamo railway station (Italian: Stazione di Bergamo) serves the city and comune of Bergamo, in the region of Lombardy, northern Italy. Opened in 1854, it is located at the junction of lines to Brescia, Lecco, Seregno and Treviglio.

The station is currently managed by Rete Ferroviaria Italiana (RFI). However, the commercial area of the passenger building is managed by Centostazioni. Each of these companies is a subsidiary of Ferrovie dello Stato (FS), Italy's state-owned rail company.

The train services are operated by Trenord and Trenitalia.

== Location ==
Bergamo railway station is situated at Piazza Guglielmo Marconi, at the south eastern edge of the city centre.

== History ==
According to the Central Statistical Office of the FS, the station was opened on 22 April 1854, upon the inauguration of the whole of the Bergamo–Brescia railway. However, another source says that the Bergamo–Brescia railway was opened only in stages. According to that source, the Coccaglio-Brescia and Brescia-Verona sections both become operational on 22 April 1854 and were formally opened two days later, while the connection to Bergamo was not completed until 12 October 1857.

== Features ==
The passenger building is connected with the seven through tracks and two platform docks of the station yard by a small pedestrian underpass, which also connects the station with Via Gavazzeni, near a school campus.

The underpass was finally opened in autumn 2008, almost fifty years after it was first proposed.

== Train services ==
The station had about 10.3 million passenger movements in the year 2010.

The station is served by the following service(s):

- Express regional services (Treno regio Express) Milan – Pioltello – Verdello – Bergamo
- Regional services (Treno regionale) Milan – Monza – Carnate – Bergamo
- Regional services (Treno regionale) Lecco – Calolziocorte – Bergamo
- Regional services (Treno regionale) Bergamo – Rovato – Brescia
- Regional services (Treno regionale) Treviglio – Verdello – Bergamo
- Regional services (Treno regionale) Bergamo – Brescia – Cremona – Fidenza – Massa – Pisa (1x per day, usually only in summer months)
- High Speed Services (both from Italo and Trenitalia) to Rome and Naples, with three couples of trains per day

== Interchange ==
The station is connected with the urban transport network by line 1 of the ATB, which links the Old Town with Bergamo's Orio al Serio Airport. Not far away is the bus station, with bus lines to almost all municipalities in the Province, and the terminus of the Bergamo–Albino light rail.

== Gallery ==
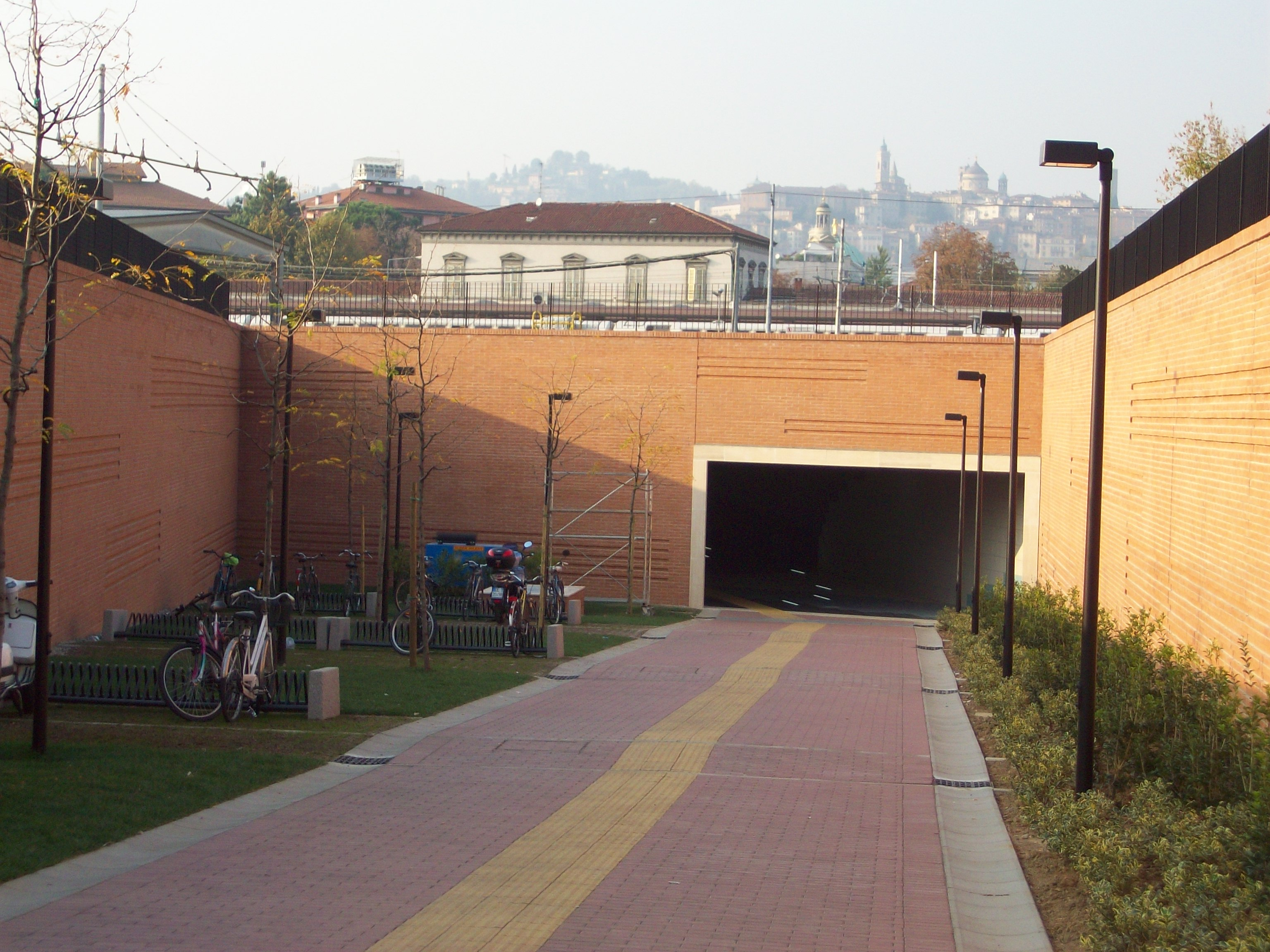
Entrance to the underpass

== See also ==
- History of rail transport in Italy
- List of railway stations in Lombardy
- Rail transport in Italy
- Railway stations in Italy
- Monza–Trezzo–Bergamo Tramway
