= Tirano–Lecco railway =

Railway line in Italy

Overview
- Status: in use
- Owner: RFI
- Locale: Lombardy, Italy
- Termini: Tirano; Lecco

Service
- Type: Heavy rail
- Operator(s): Trenord

History
- Opened: 1902

Technical
- Line length: 105 km (65 mi)
- Track gauge: 1,435 mm (4 ft 8 1/2 in) standard gauge
- Electrification: 3 kV DC overhead line

The Tirano–Lecco railway is an electrified railway line in Lombardy, Italy.

The first section of the line, between Sondrio and Colico, was opened in 1885. It was completed in 1892–1894 with the section from Colico to Lecco, where it was connected with the rest of the Italian network.

It is single track other than at main stations which have passing loops.

The section from Tirano to Sondrio had a different origin, being opened in 1902 as a private railway by the Società Anonima per le Ferrovie dell'Alta Valtellina (FAV). It was integrated in the state network in 1970. It was subsequently electrified in 1977.

== See also ==
- List of railway lines in Italy

== Bibliography ==
- RFI - Fascicolo linea 26
