= Como–Lecco railway =

Railway line in Italy

Overview
- Native name: Ferrovia Lecco-Como
- Status: in use
- Owner: RFI
- Locale: Lombardy, Italy
- Termini: Lecco railway station; Como railway station
- Stations: 15

Service
- Type: heavy rail
- Services: R18
- Route number: 170
- Operator(s): Trenord

History
- Opened: 20 November 1888

Technical
- Line length: 41 km (25 mi)
- Number of tracks: 1
- Track gauge: 1,435 mm (4 ft 8 1/2 in) standard gauge
- Electrification: no
- Operating speed: 90 km/h (56 mph)

The Como–Lecco railway is a railway line in Lombardy, Italy.

The railway line was opened on 20 November 1888.

== See also ==
- List of railway lines in Italy
