= Lecco–Milan railway =

Railway line in Italy

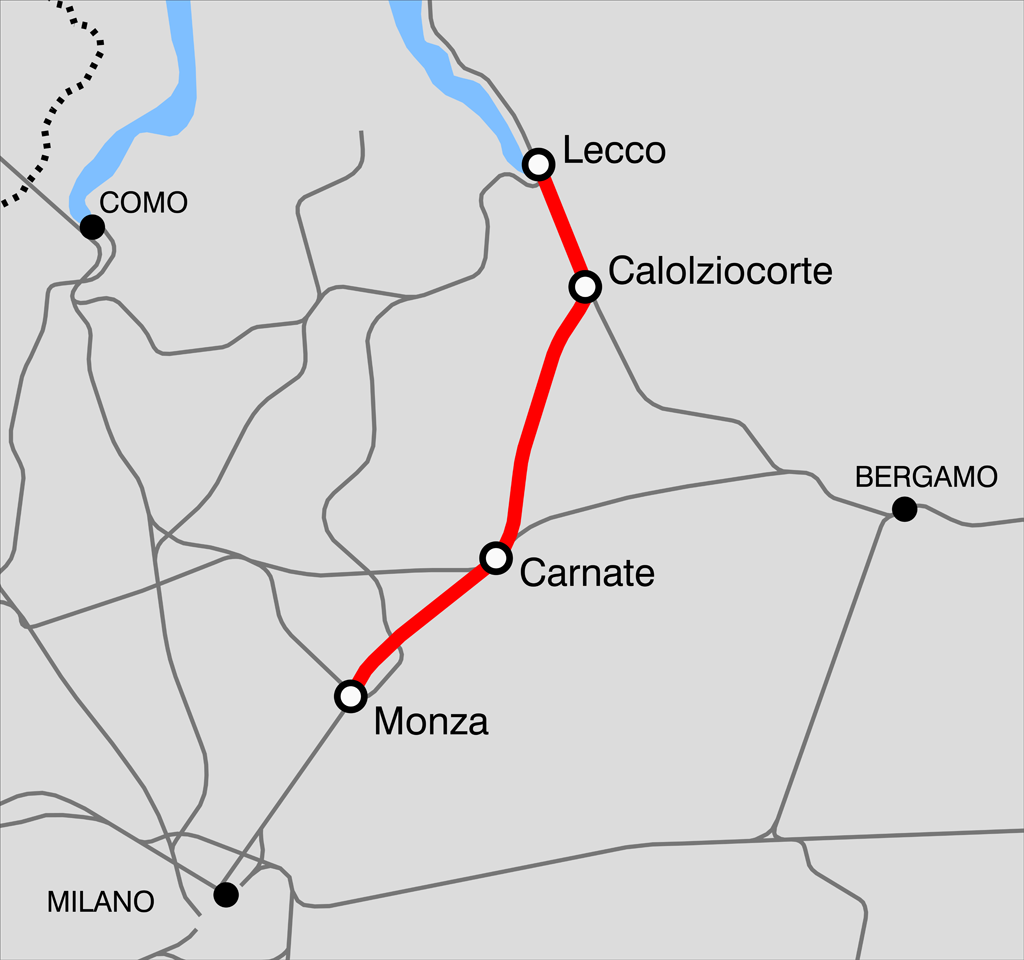

Overview
- Status: in use
- Owner: RFI
- Locale: Lombardy, Italy
- Termini: Lecco; Milan

Service
- Type: Heavy rail
- Route number: 180
- Operator(s): Trenord

History
- Opened: 27 December 1873

Technical
- Line length: 50 km (31 mi)
- Track gauge: 1,435 mm (4 ft 8 1/2 in) standard gauge
- Electrification: 3 kV DC overhead line

The Lecco–Milan railway is a railway line in Lombardy, Italy.

The railway line was opened on 27 December 1873 between Monza and Calolziocorte, using the existing branches from Lecco to Calolziocorte (opened in 1863) and from Monza to Milan (opened in 1840).

After the Monza-Calolziocorte, another railway connecting Monza and Lecco was built (1911, Monza-Molteno-Lecco railway), then today the first line is usually called "Milano-Lecco through Carnate", and the second "Milano-Lecco through Molteno".

== See also ==
- Line S8 (Milan suburban railway service)
- List of railway lines in Italy

== Bibliography ==
- Rete Ferroviaria Italiana: Fascicolo Linea 27.
