= List of municipalities of the Province of Monza and Brianza =

The following is a list of the 55 municipalities (comuni) of the Province of Monza and Brianza in the region of Lombardy in Italy.

== List ==
Municipality	Population (2026)	Area (km²)	Density
Agrate Brianza	15,891	11.22	1,416.3
Aicurzio	2,072	2.47	838.9
Albiate	6,720	2.86	2,349.7
Arcore	17,938	9.25	1,939.2
Barlassina	6,985	2.76	2,530.8
Bellusco	7,487	6.54	1,144.8
Bernareggio	11,706	5.93	1,974.0
Besana in Brianza	15,503	15.76	983.7
Biassono	12,430	4.89	2,541.9
Bovisio-Masciago	16,953	4.93	3,438.7
Briosco	6,131	6.61	927.5
Brugherio	35,471	10.41	3,407.4
Burago di Molgora	4,370	3.43	1,274.1
Busnago	6,882	5.78	1,190.7
Camparada	2,261	1.63	1,387.1
Caponago	5,050	5.04	1,002.0
Carate Brianza	18,054	9.92	1,820.0
Carnate	7,992	3.47	2,303.2
Cavenago di Brianza	7,590	4.39	1,728.9
Ceriano Laghetto	6,675	7.08	942.8
Cesano Maderno	40,177	11.51	3,490.6
Cogliate	8,469	6.96	1,216.8
Concorezzo	16,153	8.51	1,898.1
Cornate d'Adda	11,134	13.82	805.6
Correzzana	3,289	2.51	1,310.4
Desio	41,872	14.76	2,836.9
Giussano	26,509	10.28	2,578.7
Lazzate	7,722	5.31	1,454.2
Lentate sul Seveso	16,049	13.98	1,148.0
Lesmo	8,376	5.12	1,635.9
Limbiate	35,865	12.29	2,918.2
Lissone	46,792	9.30	5,031.4
Macherio	7,582	3.18	2,384.3
Meda	23,735	8.31	2,856.2
Mezzago	4,479	4.32	1,036.8
Misinto	5,749	5.11	1,125.0
Monza	123,672	33.09	3,737.4
Muggiò	23,585	5.48	4,303.8
Nova Milanese	23,068	5.85	3,943.2
Ornago	5,487	5.88	933.2
Renate	3,983	2.89	1,378.2
Roncello	4,772	3.16	1,510.1
Ronco Briantino	3,777	2.97	1,271.7
Seregno	45,240	13.05	3,466.7
Seveso	23,982	7.40	3,240.8
Sovico	8,313	3.26	2,550.0
Sulbiate	4,532	5.20	871.5
Triuggio	8,776	8.34	1,052.3
Usmate Velate	10,740	9.75	1,101.5
Varedo	14,039	4.85	2,894.6
Vedano al Lambro	7,363	1.98	3,718.7
Veduggio con Colzano	4,182	3.56	1,174.7
Verano Brianza	9,126	3.52	2,592.6
Villasanta	14,305	4.86	2,943.4
Vimercate	26,341	20.72	1,271.3

== See also ==
- List of municipalities of Lombardy
- List of municipalities of Italy
