= List of museums in Province of Monza and Brianza =

This is a list of museums in the Province of Como, Lombardy Region, Italy.

== Museums and ecomuseums ==
Name	Image	Location	City	Province	Network	Area of study	Summary
Piccolo Museo degli usi e dei costumi della gente di Aicurzio			Aicurzio	Monza and Brianza		Ethnography	
Museo Civico Carlo Verri			Biassono	Monza and Brianza			
Fondazione Rossini			Briosco	Monza and Brianza			
Museo di Pio Mariani			Desio	Monza and Brianza			
Museo Etnografico Naturalistico del territorio			Giussano	Milan		Ethnography	
Museo Civico			Lentate sul Seveso	Monza and Brianza			
Museo d'arte contemporanea			Lissone	Monza and Brianza		Art	
Museo e Tesoro del Duomo di Monza			Monza	Monza and Brianza		Art	
Musei civici			Monza	Monza and Brianza			
MEMB Museo etnologico di Monza e Brianza			Monza	Monza and Brianza		Ethnography	
Collezione del pittore Vittorio Vicani			Nova Milanese	Monza and Brianza			
Collezione permanente delle Arti del Fuoco			Nova Milanese	Monza and Brianza		Ethnography	
Ecomuseo del Territorio di Nova Milanese nel parco Grugnotorto Villoresi			Nova Milanese	Monza and Brianza	Ecomuseum recognized by the Lombardy Region	Ecomuseum	
Museo agricolo			Ronco Briantino	Monza and Brianza		Ethnography	
MUAS			Villasanta	Monza and Brianza		Art	Museum of sacral art.
MUST			Vimercate	Monza and Brianza			Located in Villa Sottocasa. Museum with a multimedia design.
