= Roncello =

- Comune
- Comune di Roncello
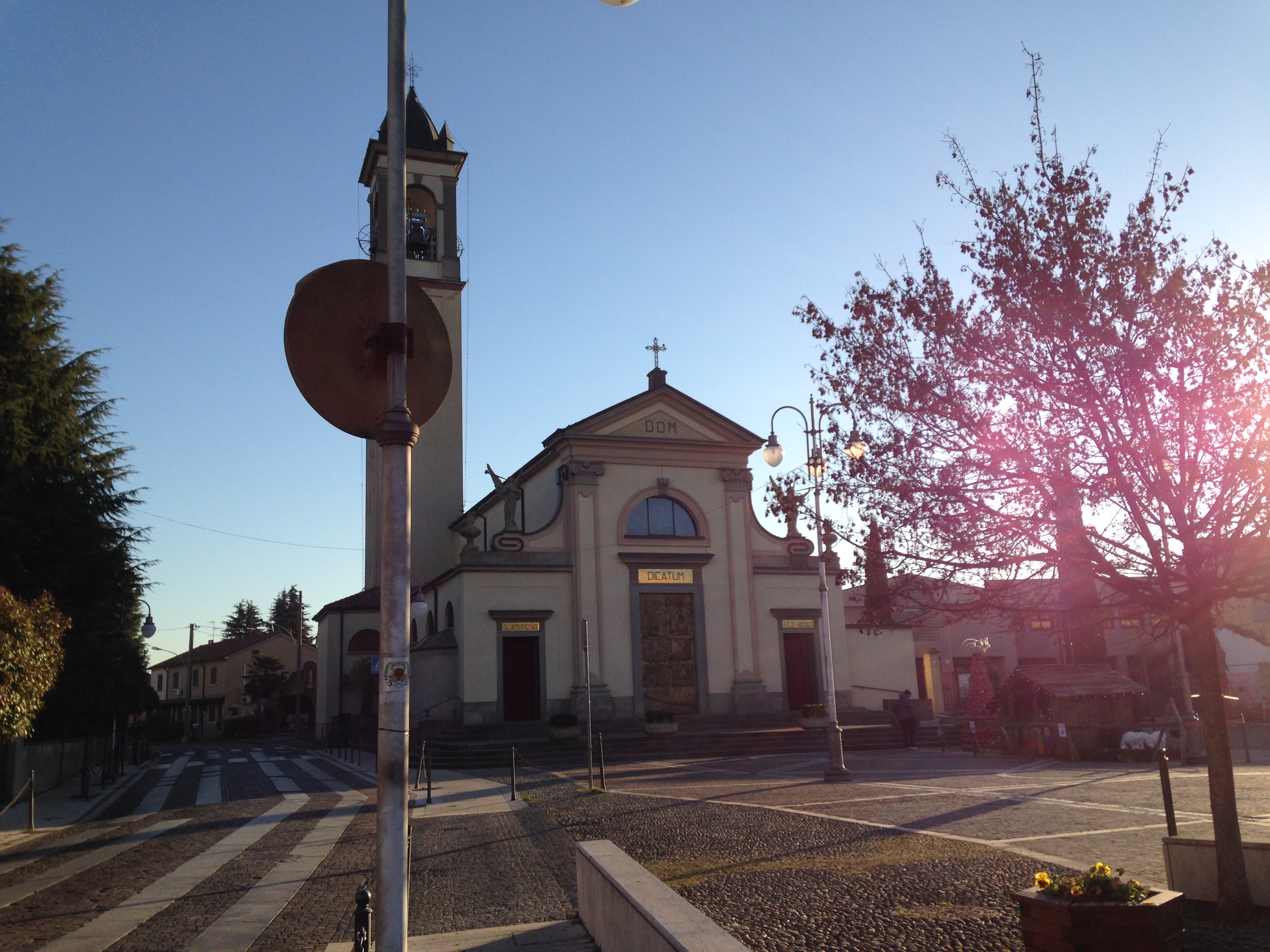
- View of Roncello

- Coat of arms

- Location within Italy Location within Lombardy
- Coordinates: 45°36′N 9°27′E
- Country: Italy
- Region: Lombardy
- Province: Monza and Brianza (MB)

Government
  - Mayor: Cristian Pulici

Area
  - Total: 3.16 km^{2} (1.22 sq mi)
- Elevation: 196 m (643 ft)

Population (1-1-2022)
  - Total: 4,780
  - Density: 1,510/km^{2} (3,920/sq mi)
- Demonym: Roncellese(i)
- Time zone: UTC+1 (CET)
  - Summer (DST): UTC+2 (CEST)
- Postal code: 20877
- Dialing code: 039
- Patron saint: Ambrogio and Carlo
- Saint day: Third sunday of October
- Website: Official website

Roncello is a comune (municipality) in the Province of Monza and Brianza in the Italian region Lombardy, located about 25 kilometres (16 mi) northeast of Milan.

Roncello borders the following municipalities: Bellusco, Busnago, Ornago, Trezzano Rosa, Basiano.

== Notable people ==
- Paolo Pulici – 1950, soccer player.

== Twin towns ==
- Nowy Duninów, Poland
