= Trezzano Rosa =

Trezzano Rosa Trescian (Lombard)
- Comune
- Comune di Trezzano Rosa
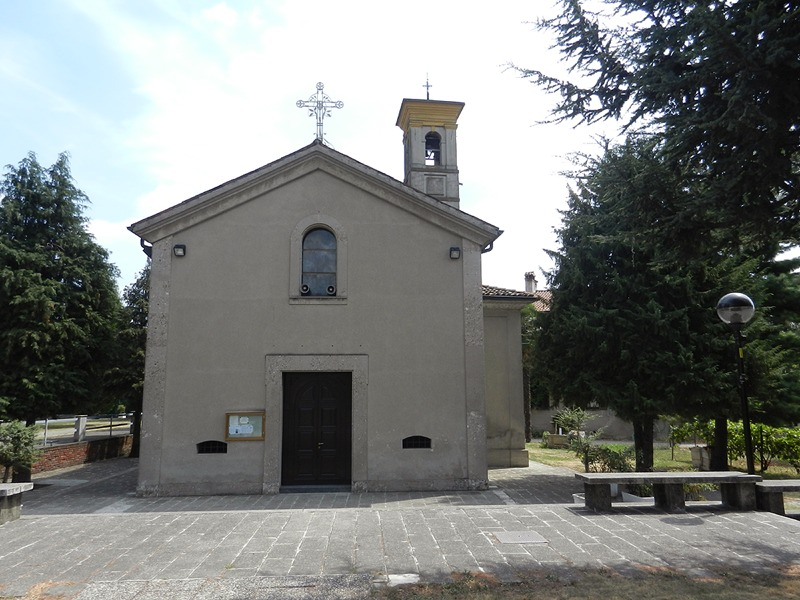
- Church of Santa Maria

- Coat of arms

- Location within Italy Location within Lombardy
- Coordinates: 45°35′N 9°29′E
- Country: Italy
- Region: Lombardy
- Metropolitan city: Milan (MI)

Area
  - Total: 3.5 km^{2} (1.4 sq mi)
- Elevation: 188 m (617 ft)

Population (Dec. 2004)
  - Total: 3,992
  - Density: 1,100/km^{2} (3,000/sq mi)
- Demonym: Trezzanesi
- Time zone: UTC+1 (CET)
  - Summer (DST): UTC+2 (CEST)
- Postal code: 20060
- Dialing code: 02
- Patron saint: Saint Gotthard of Hildesheim
- Saint day: 4 May
- Website: Official website

Trezzano Rosa (local Lombard: Trescian) is a comune (municipality) in the Province of Milan in the Italian region Lombardy, located about 30 kilometres (19 mi) northeast of Milan. As of 31 December 2004, it had a population of 3,992 and an area of 3.5 square kilometres (1.4 mi^{2}).

Trezzano Rosa borders the following municipalities: Busnago, Roncello, Grezzago, Basiano, Pozzo d'Adda.

== Demographic evolution ==
Historical population

Year	Pop.	±%
1861	844	—
1871	918	+8.8%
1881	1,045	+13.8%
1901	1,204	+15.2%
1911	1,428	+18.6%

Year	Pop.	±%
1921	1,292	−9.5%
1931	1,233	−4.6%
1936	1,254	+1.7%
1951	1,374	+9.6%
1961	1,335	−2.8%

Year	Pop.	±%
1971	1,347	+0.9%
1981	1,473	+9.4%
1991	2,344	+59.1%
2001	3,760	+60.4%

Source: Data from ISTAT
