= Basiano =

Basiano Basiàn (Lombard)
- Comune
- Comune di Basiano
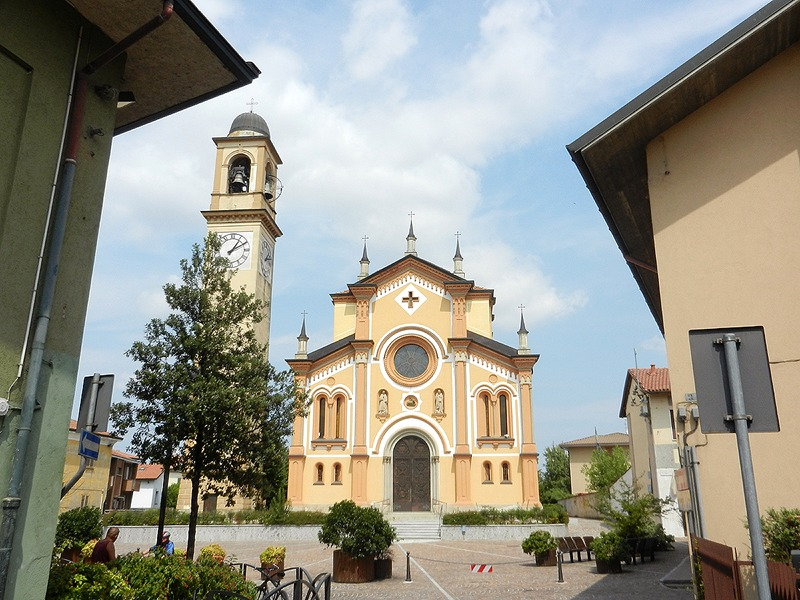
- The church of San Gregorio

- Coat of arms

- Location within Italy Location within Lombardy
- Coordinates: 45°34′N 9°28′E
- Country: Italy
- Region: Lombardy
- Metropolitan city: Milan (MI)

Government
  - Mayor: Douglas De Franciscis

Area
  - Total: 4.6 km^{2} (1.8 sq mi)
- Elevation: 164 m (538 ft)

Population (31 December 2010)
  - Total: 5,523
  - Density: 1,200/km^{2} (3,100/sq mi)
- Demonym: Basianesi
- Time zone: UTC+1 (CET)
  - Summer (DST): UTC+2 (CEST)
- Postal code: 20060
- Dialing code: 02
- Website: Official website

Basiano (Brianzöö: Basiàn) is a comune (municipality) in the province of Milan in the Italian region Lombardy, located about 25 kilometres (16 mi) northeast of Milan.

Basiano borders the following municipalities: Ornago, Roncello, Trezzano Rosa, Cavenago di Brianza, Pozzo d'Adda, Cambiago, Masate.
