= Burago di Molgora =

- Comune
- Comune di Burago di Molgora
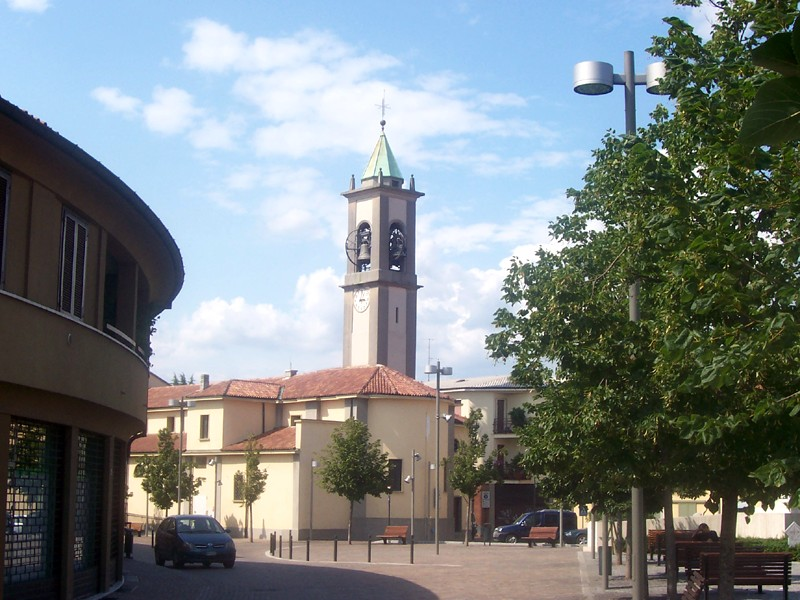
- View of Burago di Molgora

- Coat of arms

- Location within Italy Location within Lombardy
- Coordinates: 45°36′N 9°23′E
- Country: Italy
- Region: Lombardy
- Province: Monza and Brianza (MB)

Government
  - Mayor: Angelo Mandelli

Area
  - Total: 3.4 km^{2} (1.3 sq mi)

Population (31 December 2010)
  - Total: 4,250
  - Density: 1,200/km^{2} (3,200/sq mi)
- Demonym: Buraghesi
- Time zone: UTC+1 (CET)
  - Summer (DST): UTC+2 (CEST)
- Postal code: 20875
- Dialing code: 039
- Website: Official website

Burago di Molgora is a comune (municipality) in the Province of Monza and Brianza in the Italian region Lombardy, located about 20 km (12 mi) northeast of Milan.

Burago di Molgora borders the following municipalities: Vimercate, Ornago, Cavenago di Brianza, Agrate Brianza. The economy, traditionally based on agriculture, is now concentrated in middle- or small-size industries, tertiary industries, and service companies. The city is the seat of Bburago, a scale model maker, and of Pasini Laboratorio chimico, producer of Crystal Ball.

== Immigration ==
- Demographic Statistics

- Number of immigrants at 2009 (the first seven for nationality)
  - Morocco: 71
  - Romania: 58
  - Ecuador: 25
  - Albania: 12
  - Peru: 9
  - Serbia: 8
  - Ukraine: 7
