= Paderno Dugnano =

Paderno Dugnano Paderna Dugnan (Lombard)
- Comune
- Città di Paderno Dugnano
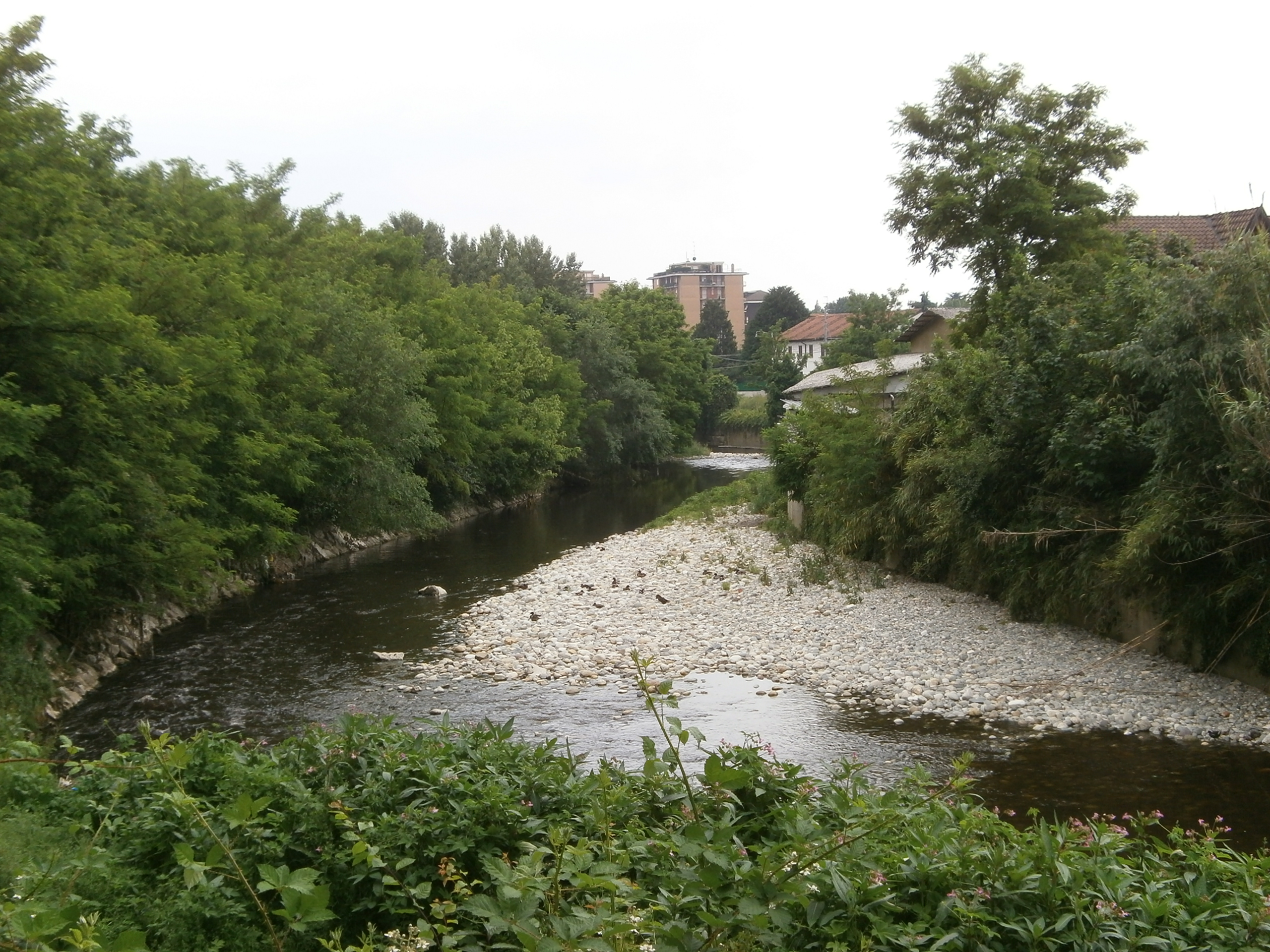
- The Seveso river at Palazzolo Milanese.

- Location within Italy Location within Lombardy
- Coordinates: 45°34′N 09°10′E
- Country: Italy
- Region: Lombardy
- Metropolitan city: Milan (MI)
- Frazioni: Calderara, Cassina Amata, Dugnano, Incirano, Paderno, Palazzolo Milanese, Villaggio Ambrosiano

Government
  - Mayor: Anna Varisco

Area
  - Total: 14.10 km^{2} (5.44 sq mi)
- Elevation: 163 m (535 ft)

Population (31 December 2017)
  - Total: 46,590
  - Density: 3,304/km^{2} (8,558/sq mi)
- Demonym: Padernesi
- Time zone: UTC+1 (CET)
  - Summer (DST): UTC+2 (CEST)
- Postal code: 20037
- Dialing code: 02
- Website: Official website

Paderno Dugnano (Milanese: Paderna Dugnan [paˈdɛrna dyˈɲãː]) is a town and comune in the Metropolitan City of Milan, in Lombardy, northern Italy. It is bounded by comuni of Senago, Limbiate, Varedo, Cusano Milanino, Cormano, Nova Milanese, Bollate, Novate Milanese, Cinisello Balsamo. Paderno Dugnano is about 15 kilometers from the center of Milan.

Following the unification of Italy in 1861, a reorganization of the internal subdivisions of the country ensued. By decree of 17 March 1869, the comuni of Paderno, Dugnano, Incirano, Cassina Amata, and Palazzolo Milanese were fused into a new comune called Paderno Milanese.

Other names for the comune were proposed (including Padergnano and Borgosole) through the 1880s. By decree of 1 February 1886, the comune's name was formally changed to the current name of Paderno Dugnano.

Paderno Dugnano received the honorary title of city with a presidential decree on 25 September 1989.

== Twin towns ==
Paderno Dugnano is twinned with:

- Inđija, Serbia
