= Carnate =

Carnate Carnaa
- Comune
- Comune di Carnate
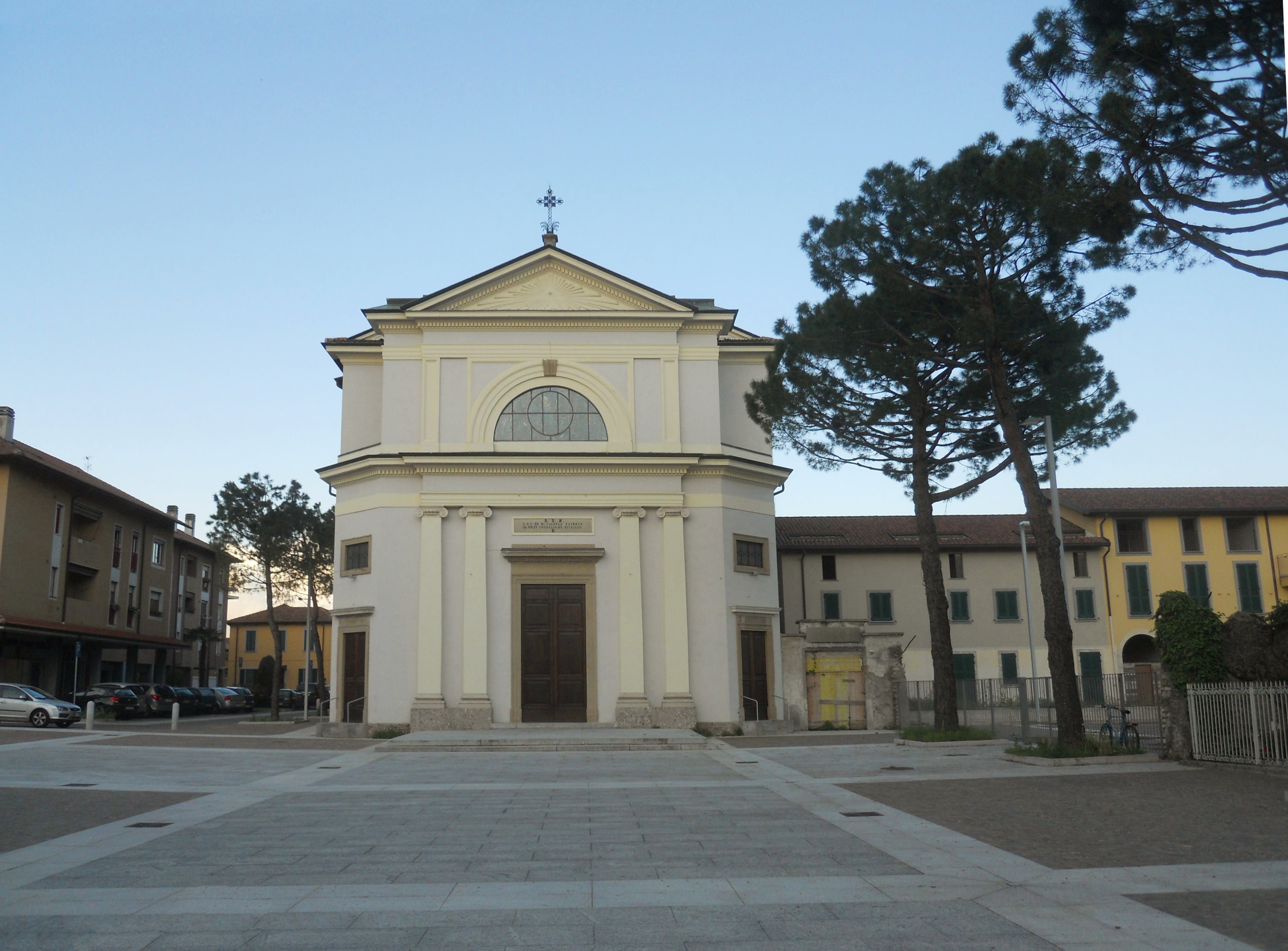

- Coat of arms

- Location within Italy Location within Lombardy
- Coordinates: 45°39′N 9°22′E
- Country: Italy
- Region: Lombardy
- Province: Monza and Brianza (MB)
- Frazioni: Passirano

Government
  - Mayor: Maurizio Riva

Area
  - Total: 3.5 km^{2} (1.4 sq mi)
- Elevation: 233 m (764 ft)

Population (31 December 2010)
  - Total: 7,270
  - Density: 2,100/km^{2} (5,400/sq mi)
- Demonym: Carnatesi
- Time zone: UTC+1 (CET)
  - Summer (DST): UTC+2 (CEST)
- Postal code: 20866
- Dialing code: 039

Carnate (Western Lombard: Carnaa) is a comune (municipality) in the Province of Monza and Brianza, in the Italian region Lombardy, located about 25 kilometres (16 mi) northeast of Milan.

Carnate borders the following municipalities: Osnago, Lomagna, Ronco Briantino, Usmate Velate, Bernareggio, Vimercate. It is served by Carnate-Usmate railway station.

Carnate's biggest attraction is the so-called Villa Banfi, an ancient mansion originally owned by the Banfi family.

== Twin towns ==
- Plaisance-du-Touch, France
