= Busnago =

- Comune
- Comune di Busnago
- Coat of arms

- Location within Italy Location within Lombardy
- Coordinates: 45°37′N 9°28′E
- Country: Italy
- Region: Lombardy
- Province: Monza and Brianza (MB)

Government
  - Mayor: Danilo Quadri

Area
  - Total: 5.9 km^{2} (2.3 sq mi)
- Elevation: 127 m (417 ft)

Population (31 January 2009)
  - Total: 6,162
  - Density: 1,000/km^{2} (2,700/sq mi)
- Demonym: Busnaghesi
- Time zone: UTC+1 (CET)
  - Summer (DST): UTC+2 (CEST)
- Postal code: 20874
- Dialing code: 039
- Website: Official website

Busnago is a comune (municipality) in the Province of Monza and Brianza in the Italian region Lombardy, located at a distance of 30 kilometres (19 mi) northeast of Milan.

== Physical Geography ==
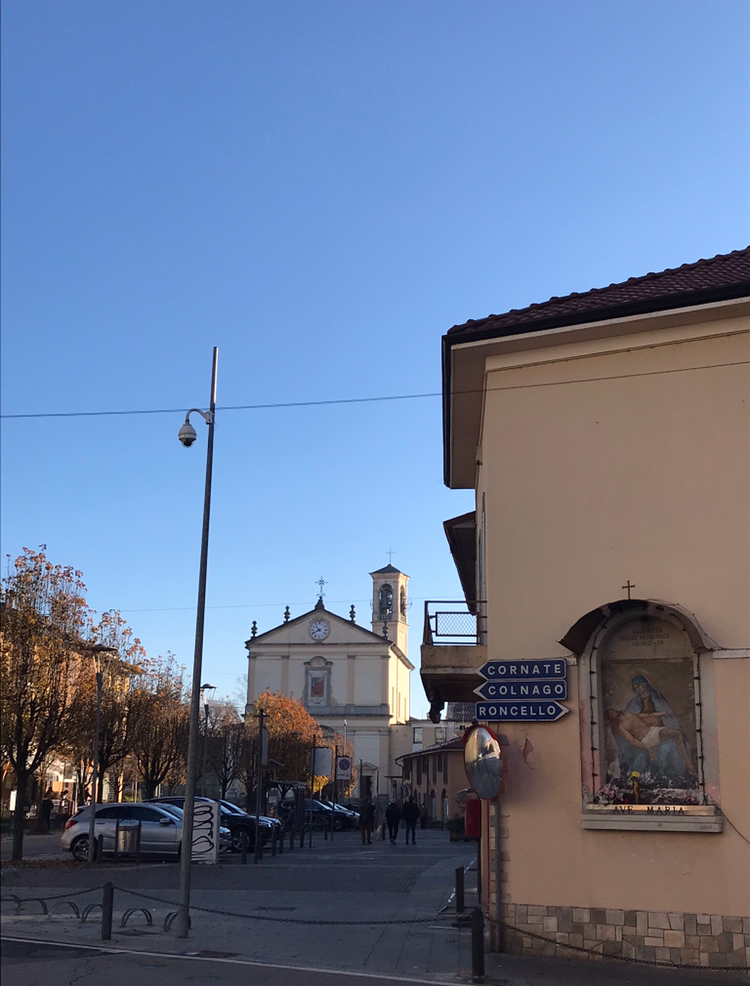
Busnago, town center.

=== Territory ===
The town lies between the Adda river to the east and the Molgora river to the southwest. Busnago borders 5 towns: Colnago, Roncello, Trezzo, Mezzago and Bellusco.

=== Climate ===
The town is 210 meters above the sea level with a mild climate in the dry area of Milan. Busnago has an average annual rainfall of about 1 100 mm, and about 30 cm of snow. In winter, the minimums often drops below 0 ° and the maximums does not exceed 10 °. Fog is not often present, usually manifesting itself in times of high pressure.

== History ==
=== Middle Age ===
It is in 873 AD that the first mention of the name "Busnago" was mentioned in a document relating to the taking possession of some assets of Cavenago by Ansperto, the archbishop of Milan. The manuscript was made authentic by the signatures of some witnesses including the signature of "Rotecario de Buvonaco", a toponym that indicates Busnago. In the 12th century a monastery (dedicated to St. Peter) of Benedictine nuns was built. In 1344 a group of Humiliated nuns was active in a place called Corteana, a present-day farmhouse.

=== Modern Age ===
In 1538 Busnago became part of a Feud that at the beginning was possessed by the Feudal Lord D. Pagano D'Adda, and then in 1611 by his son, the Marquis Ambrogio, thanks to the right of transmission to firstborn successors. In 1595 first Status Animarum, a register with the personal and religious data of the parishioners (339 at that time in Busnago) used for determining the tithe (tenth part of the wealth) to be paid to the parish. In 1652 the municipality was included in a new Feud possessed by the Porro-Schiaffinati's Family until 1756. In 1773 definition of the contemporary borders of the municipality and reconstruction of the Parish church of St. John Evangelist.

=== 19th Century ===
In 1805 Lombardy was included in the Italian Reign of Napoleon Bonaparte, who created a new regional and local administration introducing departments, districts and cantons. After being part of the administration of Pieve di Pontirolo Busnago entered in the department of Olona (with Milan as capital), third district of Monza and fourth canton of Gorgonzola. In 1815 the Austrian Empire reconquered Lombardy and the municipality of Busnago was underneath the ninth district of Gorgonzola. In 1853 Busnago passed in the fourth district of Gorgonzola. in 1859 the municipality was part of the fourteenth Mandamento of Gorgonzola. The Busnaghesi actively participated in the unification of Italy: 5 men were enrolled among the "Hunters of the Alps" led by Giuseppe Garibaldi in the second war of independence against Austria between 1859 and 1861; 14 instead were those enlisted for the third war of independence between 1862 and 1871.

=== 20th and 21st Century ===
In 1900 Busnago counted 1816 inhabitants, (divided in 213 families). During the First World War, when the king Vittorio Emanule III led the government to declare war on Austria, there were many Busnaghesi who asked to exempt them from military service for reasons of poverty and the need to work in the fields. A total of 37 men resident in Busnago were killed in the war between 1914 and 1918. During the last years of the 1910s in the middle of the municipality a tramway, which connected Monza with Trezzo sull'Adda and Bergamo, was built: by this intervention, the town finally emerged from isolation. With the advent of Fascism, twelve of the fifteen municipal councilors resigned in protest to the new dictatorship. In 1931 the fascists killed Ripamonti Angelo, the owner of tavern, in the middle of a squad violence. During the Second World War 21 young people died in the battle. Erminio Pellegatta was named as first mayor of the town after the Liberation of Italy, 25 April 1945. Between the 1970s and the 1980s the new administration built the secondary school, in the name of the General Carlo Alberto Dalla Chiesa and Domenico Russo who were killed by the Mafia in Palermo in 1982, and created the first public library of the town in Saint Rocco street. In 1989 it was opened the Globo shopping center that today is one of the biggest in Italy with more than 200 shops and 3000 car parking spaces. In the 1990s the municipality council promoted the project for the construction of a retirement home with over 100 beds both for self-sufficient and non-self-sufficient elderly people. Busnago has always been part of the province of Milan until 2009 when it became part of the province of Monza and Brianza.

== Monuments and places of interest ==
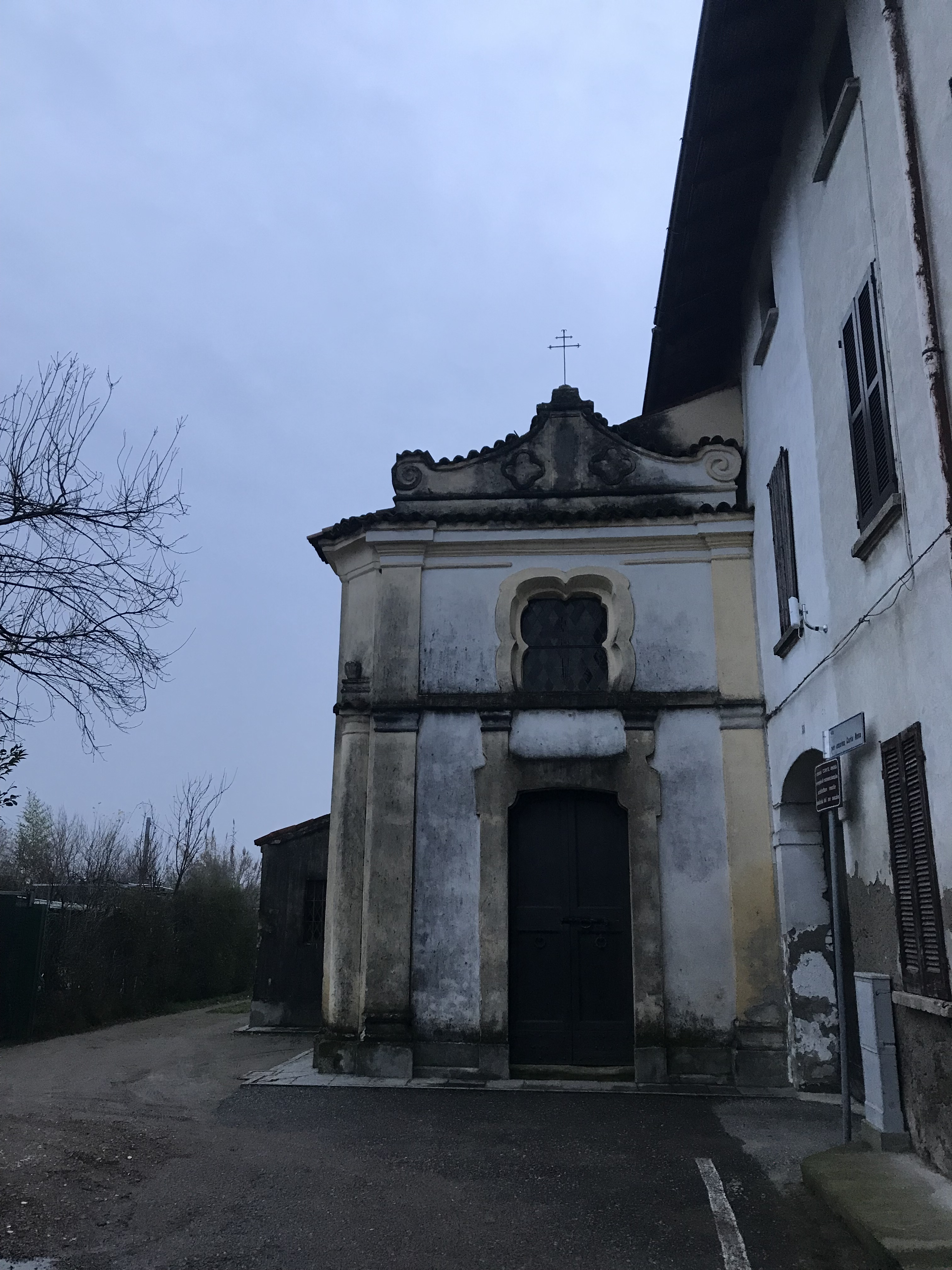
Church of Saint Margherita, Cascina Cortena, Busnago

=== Church of Santa Margherita ===
The Cortena farmhouse is located just outside the town center. In this place in 1344 a house of Humiliated nuns was founded, united with the Humiliated monastery of Santa Margherita in Monza. Some information relating to the buildings comes from pastoral visits respectively in 1566 by Saint Carlo Borromeo, archbishop of Milan, and in 1759 by Cardinal Pozzobonelli. the Cardinal described an icon, depicting Saint Margaret, painted on a panel placed on the altar of the church; A vase with holy water at the entrance, four square windows and the sacristy (a large room with a brick floor and a closet that kept sacred objects). In 1894, according to the pastoral visit of Cardinal Ferrari, the church was owned by Albini. Today the appearance of the church is the same, but it is almost never used.

=== Church of San Giovanni Evangelista ===
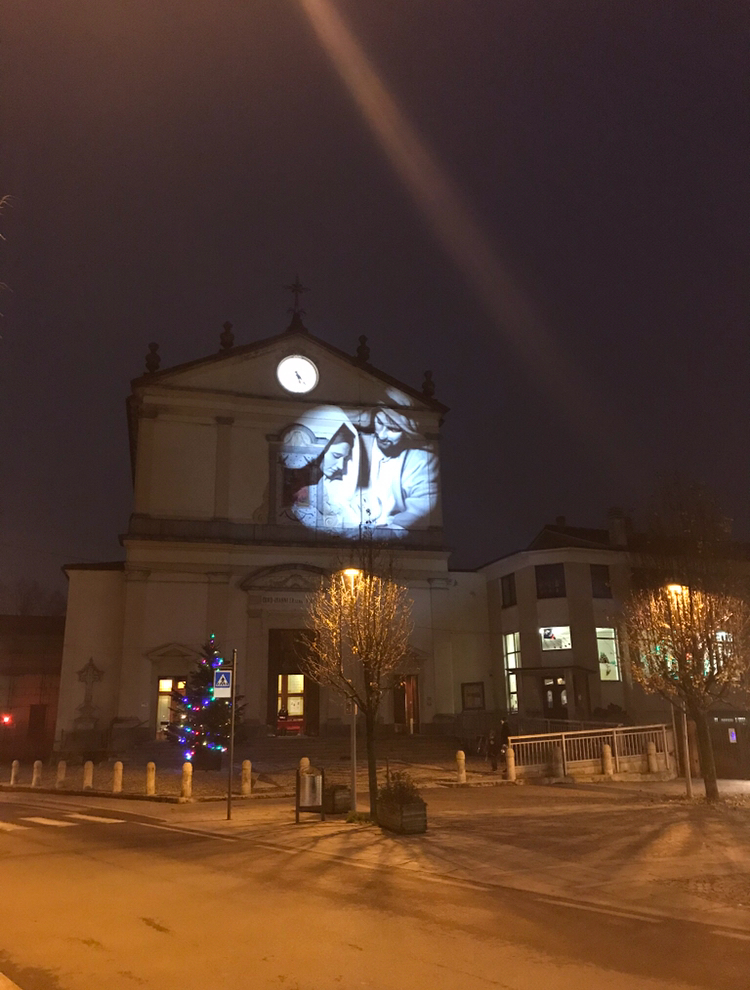
Church of Saint John the Evangelist, Busnago

From what appears on a bull of Pope Adrian of 1155, in the 12th century a church dedicated to Saint John Evangelista was built in Busnago, which became a parish church in 1538. In 1566 the archbishop of Milan Carlo Borromeo sanctioned the aggregation of the church of Roncello to the parish church of Busnago, a union that lasted until 1885. At the beginning of the 17th century, the church chapels were enlarged and restored. In 1774, thanks to the financial support of the Religion Fund, the work of complete restoration of the church began, which was practically rebuilt in the form it still takes today with the side chapels dedicated to Saint Anna and Saint John. The following year, the bell tower was also raised. From 1529 to nowadays, 26 priests succeeded one another at the head of the church of Busnago: Martino de Regibus; Priest Giovita of Bergamo; Pietro Levate de Regibus; Arcangelo Scarpini; Alessandro Orobono; Domenico Balconi; Francesco Voltolina; Gerolamo Mangili; Gerolamo Mantegazza; Pietro Antonio Castiglione; Giovanni Ambrogio Lecchi; Luigi Canzolo; Pier Paolo Bonone; Giovanni Battista Salvione; Giovanni Battista Salvecchi; Domenico Prima; Carlo Bortolomeo Zaffrani; Carlo Giuseppe Landriani; Luigi Niccolini; Carlo Coppa; Antonio Simbardi; Alfredo Bardelli; Lini Cairati; Domenico de Bernardi; Stefano Strada and Eugenio Boriotti.

=== San Luigi Oratory ===
The oratory is the emblematic place for education, training, socialization and faith. The oratory of Busnago was founded in 1908, more than 100 years ago. Given the interest of the church in childhood, it was the priest Coppa who started the project and the purchase of materials at the end of 1906. The oratory was inaugurated on 15 August 1908. From the fifties the oratory became a dynamic and active place for meetings and sports events (even if, for instance, the football team of the oratory of Busnago already existed because it was founded in 1915), inside the oratory the band (1950), the choir and a theater company (1945) were born. The Gandini priest built the cinema hall, that today is still active, and opened a small bar; while Don Enrico created the group of catechists, founded the newspaper "theTimone" (November 1963) and promoted for the first time in the mid-sixties the oratory during the summer. At the beginning of the 1970s the priest Enrico promoted a project for the construction of a new oratory which will never be built. In 1973 the cinema hall and the bar were restructured and in 1974 the new Scaenici 74 theater company was founded. In the 1980s the CSI (Italian Sports Center) reorganized the structure of low-level football. In 1989 the new priest Don Domenico promoted a project to enhance the oratory to the present day shape, the construction of a small chapel, the creation of a playground and the foundation of a new newspaper: "the Busnagori".

=== San Antonio College ===
Ran the year 1929 when in Busnago, thanks to the friars of the order of the Madonna della Misericordia, the house of Sant'Antonio (or Scotti's house, according to the last owner of the land where the house was built) was opened. The first director was Friar Stanislao and the private school was inaugurated in 1931 (at the time there was only the elementary school) . Between the 1950s and 1960s a significant reconstruction transformed the house into a college: a theater, a canteen, several games rooms, a gymnasium, several outdoor courts and the middle school were also opened. In 1996, within the college, the new cultural group of Fratel Mario Salvatori started the process of spreading the cultural, historical and religious principles of the Catholic world. Today this college is one of the most prestigious private educational institutions in Lombardy.

== Sport ==
=== Football ===
The men's football team, called Acd Busnago plays in the first category championship (2018-2019).

=== Volleyball ===
The Busnago women's volleyball team, the Volley Club 1999, currently plays in Serie B2.

=== Flag Football ===
Busnago's flag football team, the Busnago Gators, participate in the Senior League.

=== Flag Wavers ===
The Flag Wavers is a military art, a way of communication between the members of the army. It was born in Tuscany between 12th and 13th century and was practised by the Alfieri of Siena. The Torre dei Germani flag-wavers and musicians group of Busnago, which has its registered office in one of the four historic towers of the municipality (from which it takes its name), was born in 1985 and is registered with the Italian Federation of flag-wavers.
