= Pozzo d'Adda =

- Comune
- Comune di Pozzo d'Adda
- Coat of arms

- Location within Italy Location within Lombardy
- Coordinates: 45°35′N 9°30′E
- Country: Italy
- Region: Lombardy
- Metropolitan city: Milan (MI)

Area
  - Total: 4.2 km^{2} (1.6 sq mi)

Population (Dec. 2004)
  - Total: 3,903
  - Density: 930/km^{2} (2,400/sq mi)
- Time zone: UTC+1 (CET)
  - Summer (DST): UTC+2 (CEST)
- Postal code: 20060
- Dialing code: 02
- Website: Official website

Pozzo d'Adda (Lombard: Pozz [ˈpus], locally [ˈpos]) is a comune (municipality) in the Province of Milan in the Italian region Lombardy, located about 30 kilometres (19 mi) northeast of Milan. As of 31 December 2004, it had a population of 3,903 and an area of 4.2 square kilometres (1.6 mi^{2}).

Pozzo d'Adda borders the following municipalities: Grezzago, Trezzano Rosa, Basiano, Vaprio d'Adda, Masate, Inzago, Cassano d'Adda.

== Demographic evolution ==
Historical population

Year	Pop.	±%
1861	1,166	—
1871	1,295	+11.1%
1881	1,500	+15.8%
1901	1,647	+9.8%
1911	1,748	+6.1%

Year	Pop.	±%
1921	1,690	−3.3%
1931	1,549	−8.3%
1936	1,491	−3.7%
1951	1,598	+7.2%
1961	1,732	+8.4%

Year	Pop.	±%
1971	1,868	+7.9%
1981	2,328	+24.6%
1991	2,928	+25.8%
2001	3,515	+20.0%

Source: Data from ISTAT
