= Cavenago di Brianza =

Cavenago di Brianza Cavenagh (Lombard)
- Comune
- Comune di Cavenago di Brianza
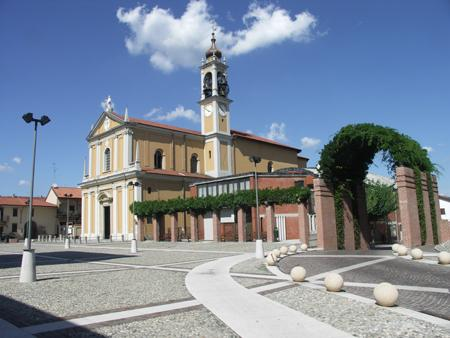

- Coat of arms

- Location within Italy Location within Lombardy
- Coordinates: 45°35′N 9°25′E
- Country: Italy
- Region: Lombardy
- Province: Monza and Brianza (MB)

Government
  - Mayor: Giacomo Biffi (Uniti per Cavenago)

Area
  - Total: 4.4 km^{2} (1.7 sq mi)
- Elevation: 176 m (577 ft)

Population (30 June 2014)
  - Total: 7,141
  - Density: 1,600/km^{2} (4,200/sq mi)
- Demonym: Cavenaghesi
- Time zone: UTC+1 (CET)
  - Summer (DST): UTC+2 (CEST)
- Postal code: 20873
- Dialing code: 02
- Website: Official website

Cavenago di Brianza (Milanese: Cavenagh) is a comune (municipality) in the Province of Monza and Brianza in the Italian region Lombardy, located about 25 kilometres (16 mi) northeast of Milan.

Cavenago di Brianza borders the following municipalities: Ornago, Burago di Molgora, Basiano, Agrate Brianza, Cambiago.
