= Sulbiate =

Municipality in the province of Monza and Brianza, Lombardy

- Comune
- Comune di Sulbiate
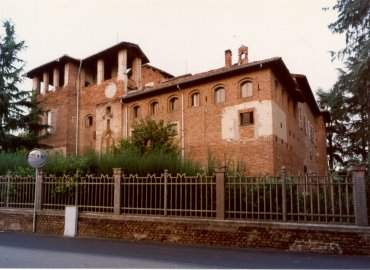
- Castello Lampugnani.

- Coat of arms

- Location within Italy Location within Lombardy
- Coordinates: 45.636°N 9.422°E
- Country: Italy
- Region: Lombardy
- Province: Monza and Brianza (MB)
- Frazioni: Brentana, Cascina Cà, Sulbiate Inferiore, Sulbiate Superiore

Government
  - Mayor: Carla Della Torre

Area
  - Total: 5.3 km^{2} (2.0 sq mi)
- Elevation: 220 m (720 ft)

Population (6 April 2014)
  - Total: 4,144
  - Density: 780/km^{2} (2,000/sq mi)
- Demonym: Sulbiatesi
- Time zone: UTC+1 (CET)
  - Summer (DST): UTC+2 (CEST)
- Postal code: 20884
- Dialing code: 039
- Website: Official website

Sulbiate is a comune (municipality) in the Province of Monza and Brianza in the Italian region Lombardy, located about 25 kilometres (16 mi) northeast of Milan.

== Main sights ==
- Church of Sant'Antonino
- Church of Sant'Ambrogio
- Church of San Pietro Apostolo
- Lampugnani Castle
- Villa Baraggia
