= Varedo =

- Comune
- Città di Varedo
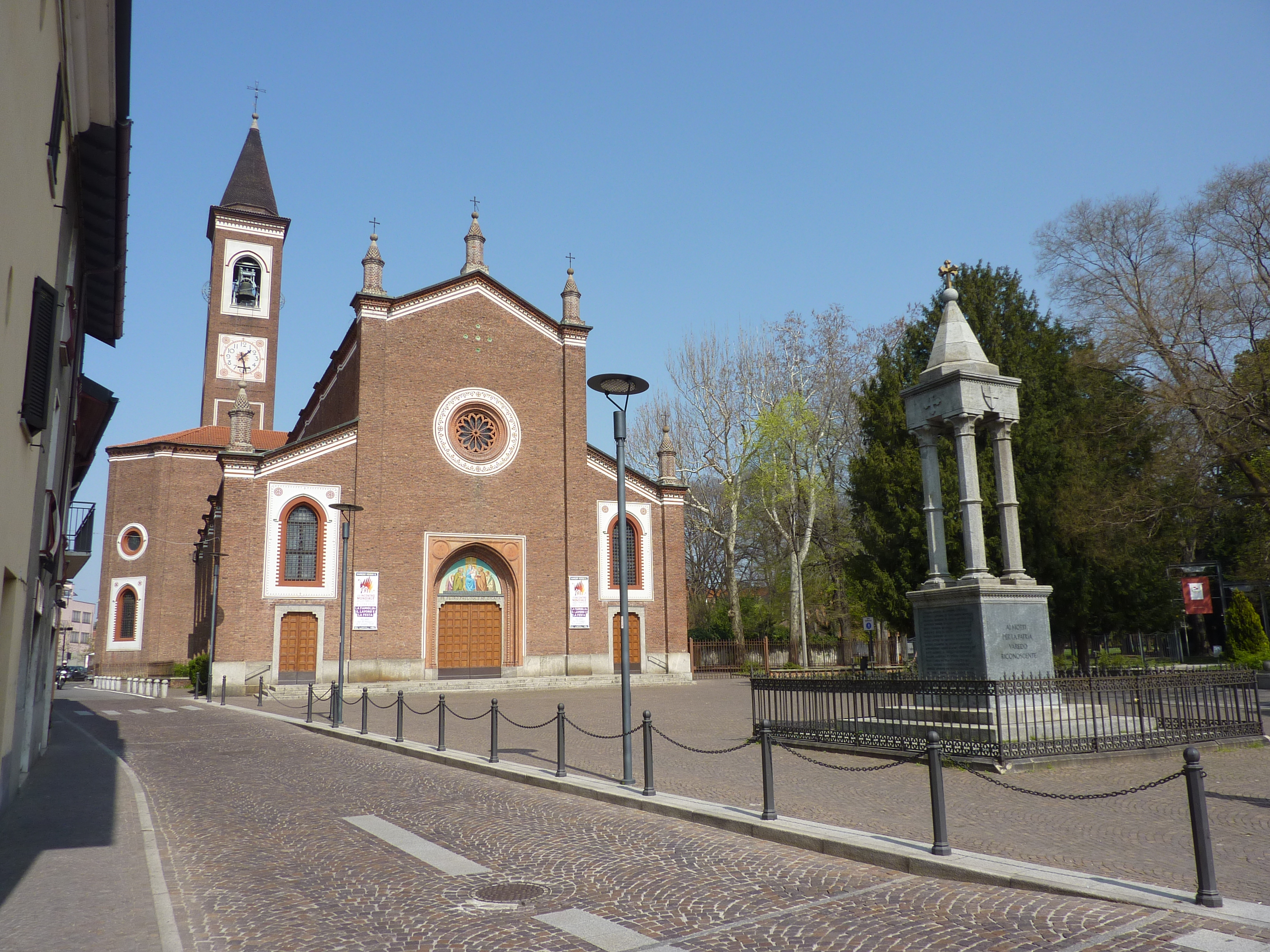

- Coat of arms

- Location within Italy Location within Lombardy
- Coordinates: 45°36′N 9°10′E
- Country: Italy
- Region: Lombardy
- Province: Monza and Brianza (MB)
- Frazioni: Valera

Government
  - Mayor: Sergio Daniel

Area
  - Total: 4.8 km^{2} (1.9 sq mi)
- Elevation: 180 m (590 ft)

Population (30 April 2009)
  - Total: 12,816
  - Density: 2,700/km^{2} (6,900/sq mi)
- Demonym: Varedesi
- Time zone: UTC+1 (CET)
  - Summer (DST): UTC+2 (CEST)
- Postal code: 20814
- Dialing code: 0362
- Website: Official website

Varedo (Milanese: Varee) is a comune (municipality) in the Province of Monza and Brianza, in the Italian region Lombardy, located about 15 kilometres (9 mi) north of Milan.

Varedo borders the following municipalities: Desio, Bovisio-Masciago, Limbiate, Nova Milanese, Paderno Dugnano.

== Immigration ==
- Demographic Stats

- Number of immigrants at 2009 (first five for nationality)
  - Romania: 189
  - Albania: 108
  - Morocco: 64
  - Ecuador: 53
  - Bangladesh: 49

== Twin towns ==
Varedo is twinned with:

- Champagnole, France (2000)
