= Verano Brianza =

- Comune
- Comune di Verano Brianza
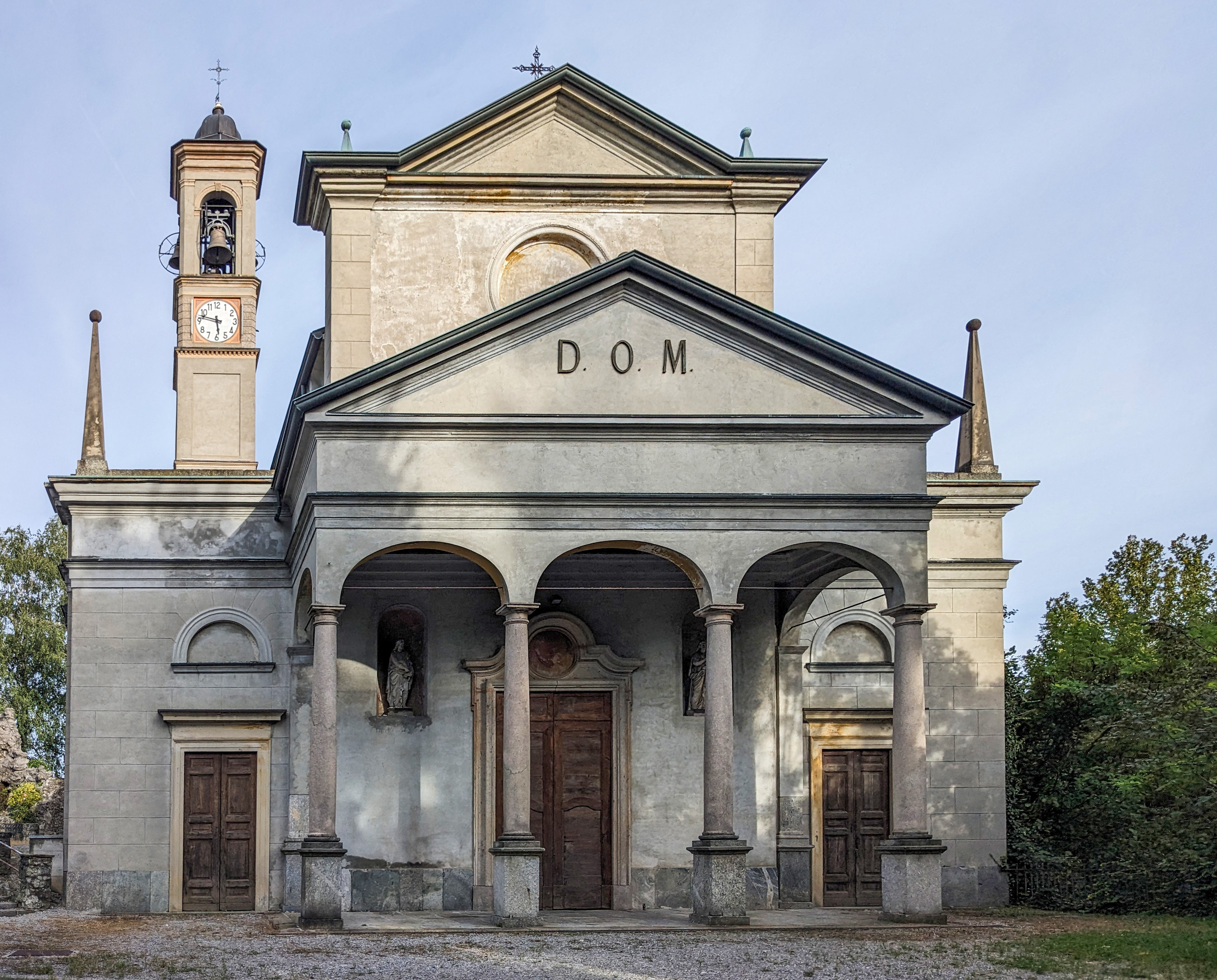
- The old Church

- Coat of arms

- Location within Italy Location within Lombardy
- Coordinates: 45°41′N 9°14′E
- Country: Italy
- Region: Lombardy
- Province: Monza and Brianza (MB)

Government
  - Mayor: Massimiliano Chiolo (ViviVerano (6 June 2016))

Area
  - Total: 3.5 km^{2} (1.4 sq mi)
- Elevation: 262 m (860 ft)

Population (Dec. 2012)
  - Total: 9,285
  - Density: 2,700/km^{2} (6,900/sq mi)
- Time zone: UTC+1 (CET)
  - Summer (DST): UTC+2 (CEST)
- Postal code: 20843
- Dialing code: 0362
- Website: Official website

Verano Brianza (Milanese: Veran) is a comune (municipality) in the Province of Monza and Brianza in the Italian region Lombardy, located about 25 kilometres (16 mi) north of Milan. As of 31 December 2004, it had a population of 8,968 and an area of 3.5 square kilometres (1.4 mi^{2}).

Verano Brianza borders the following municipalities: Briosco, Giussano, Carate Brianza.

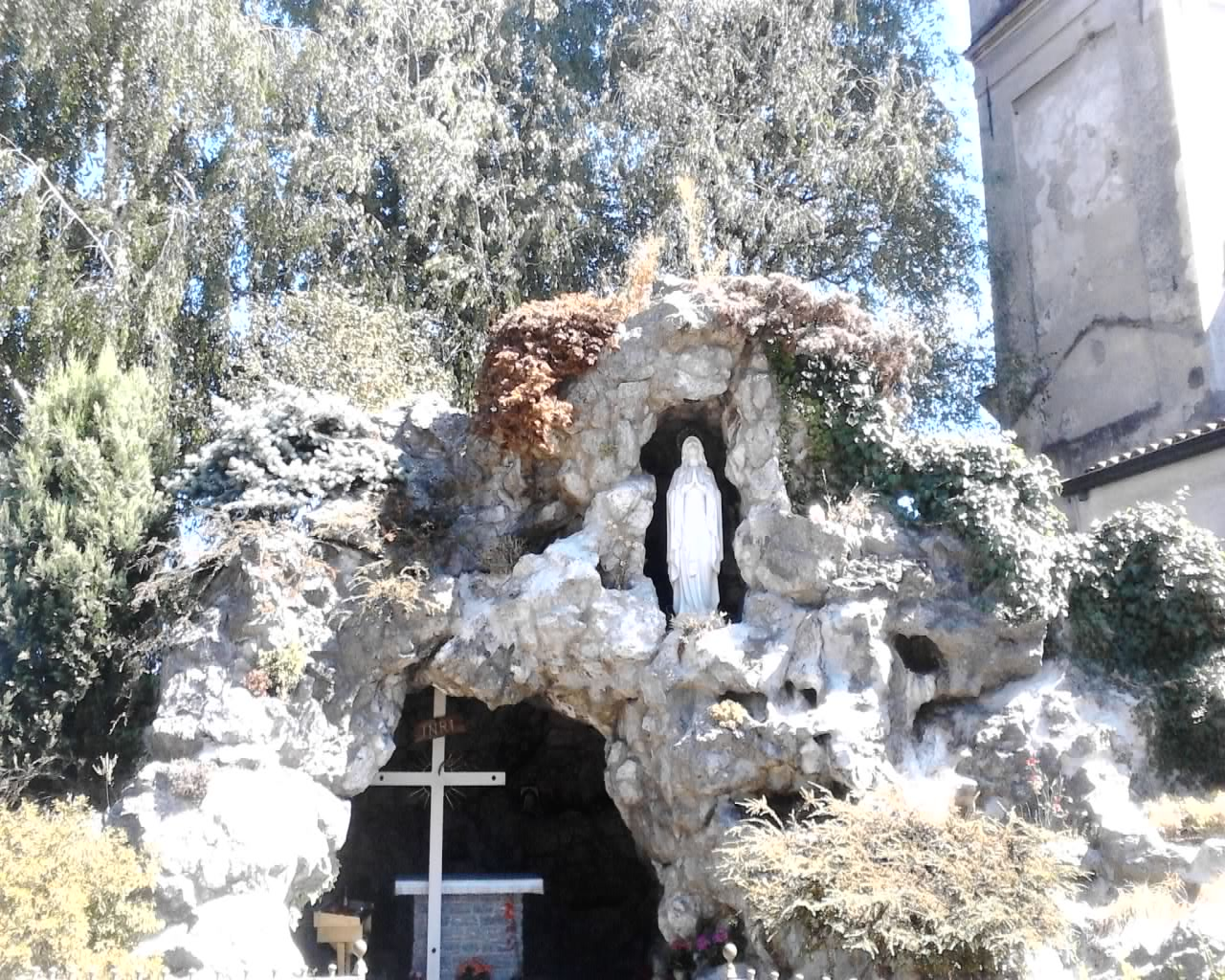
The cave dedicated to the apparition in Lourdes

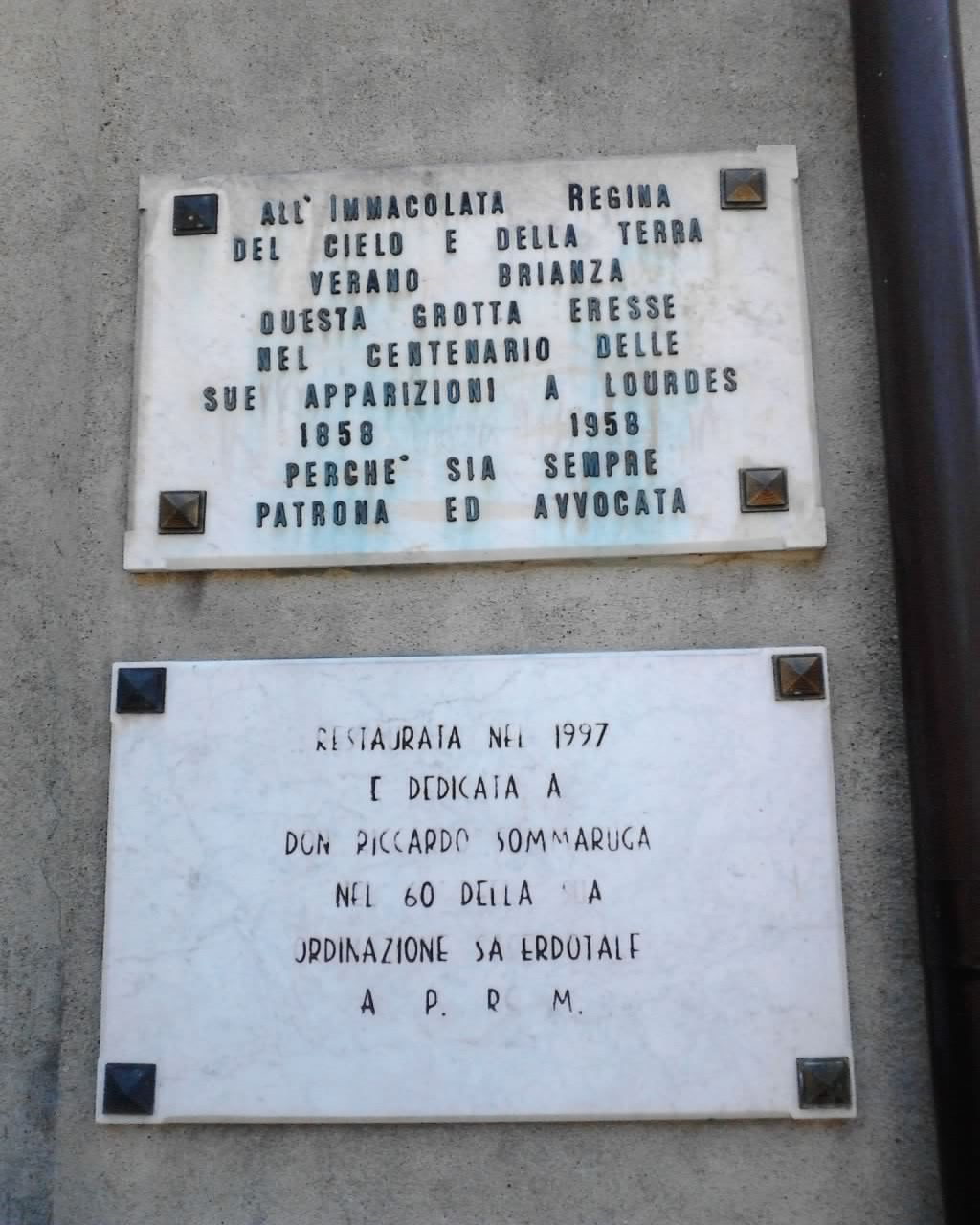
Plaque dedicated to the recurrence of the apparition

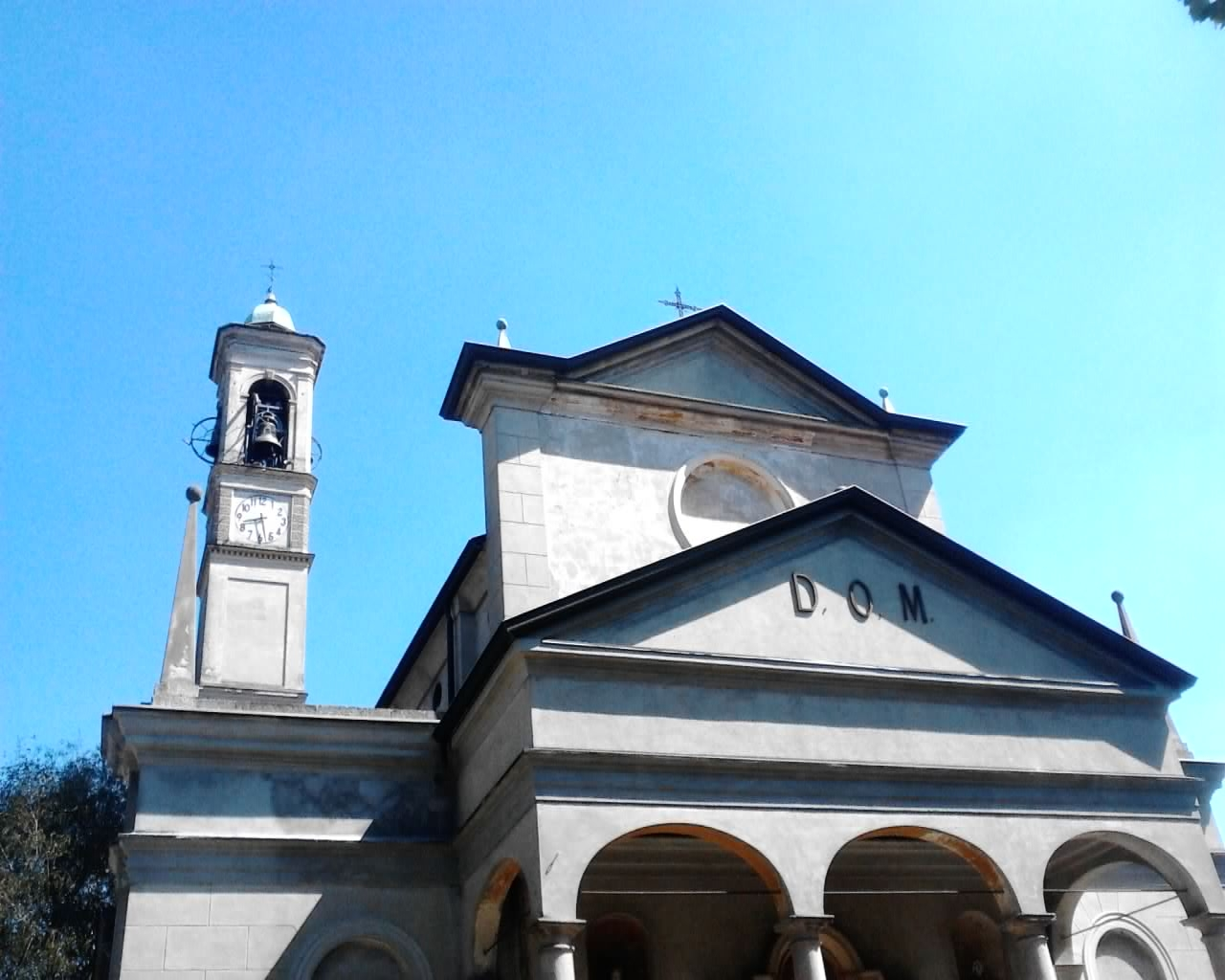
The old Church

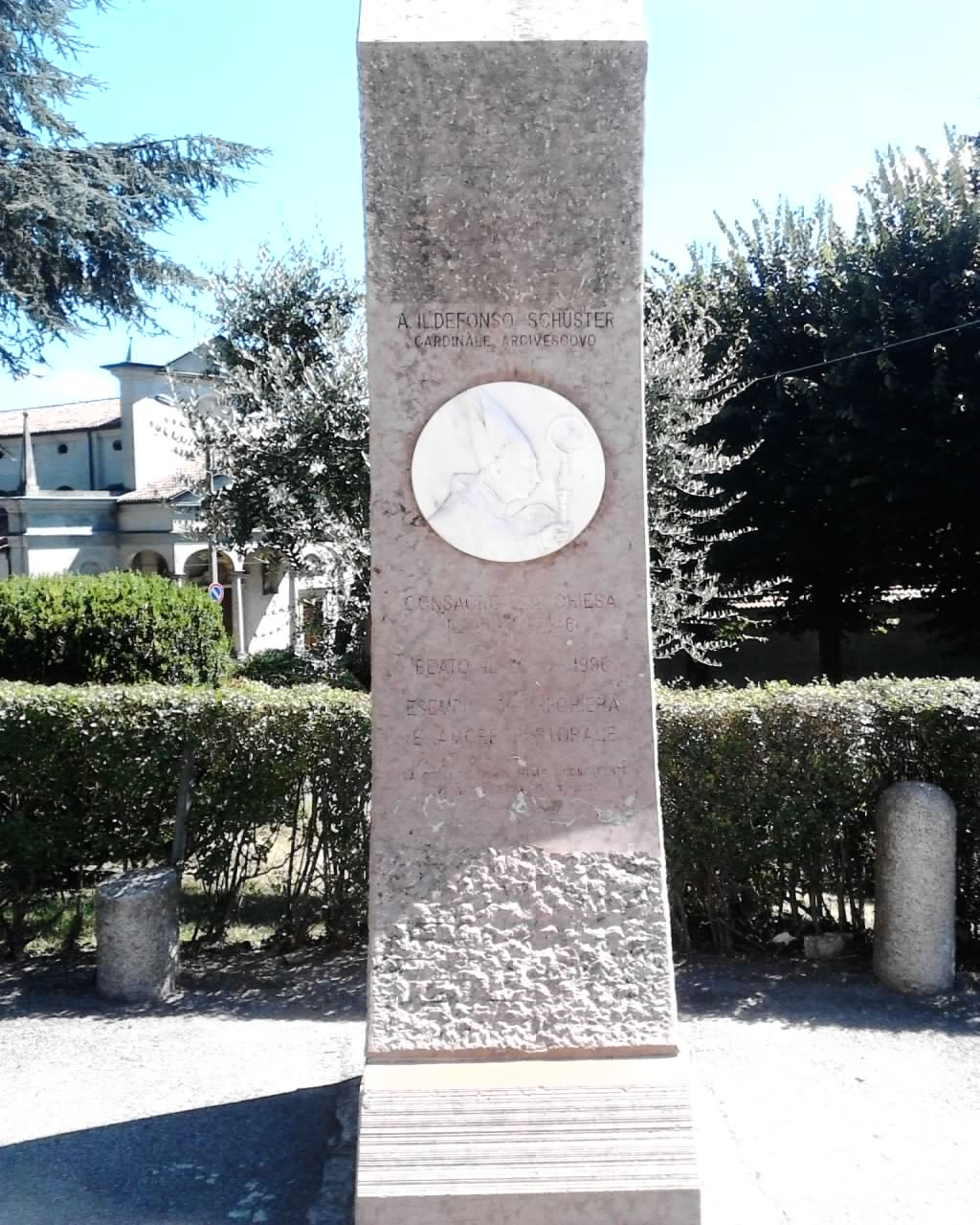
Monument dedicated to Alfredo Ildefonso Schuster

== Notable people from Verano Brianza ==
- Cesare Cattaneo, football player
- Paolo Nespoli, astronaut
- Rita Piacenza, wife of American artist Thomas Hart Benton.
- Alessandro Scanziani, football player and coach

== Demographic evolution ==
Historical population

Year	Pop.	±%
1861	1,713	—
1871	1,783	+4.1%
1881	1,922	+7.8%
1901	2,450	+27.5%
1911	2,683	+9.5%

Year	Pop.	±%
1921	2,775	+3.4%
1931	3,122	+12.5%
1936	3,333	+6.8%
1951	3,926	+17.8%
1961	4,805	+22.4%

Year	Pop.	±%
1971	6,610	+37.6%
1981	7,975	+20.7%
1991	8,407	+5.4%
2001	8,859	+5.4%

Source: Data from ISTAT
