= Muggiò =

- Comune
- Comune di Muggiò
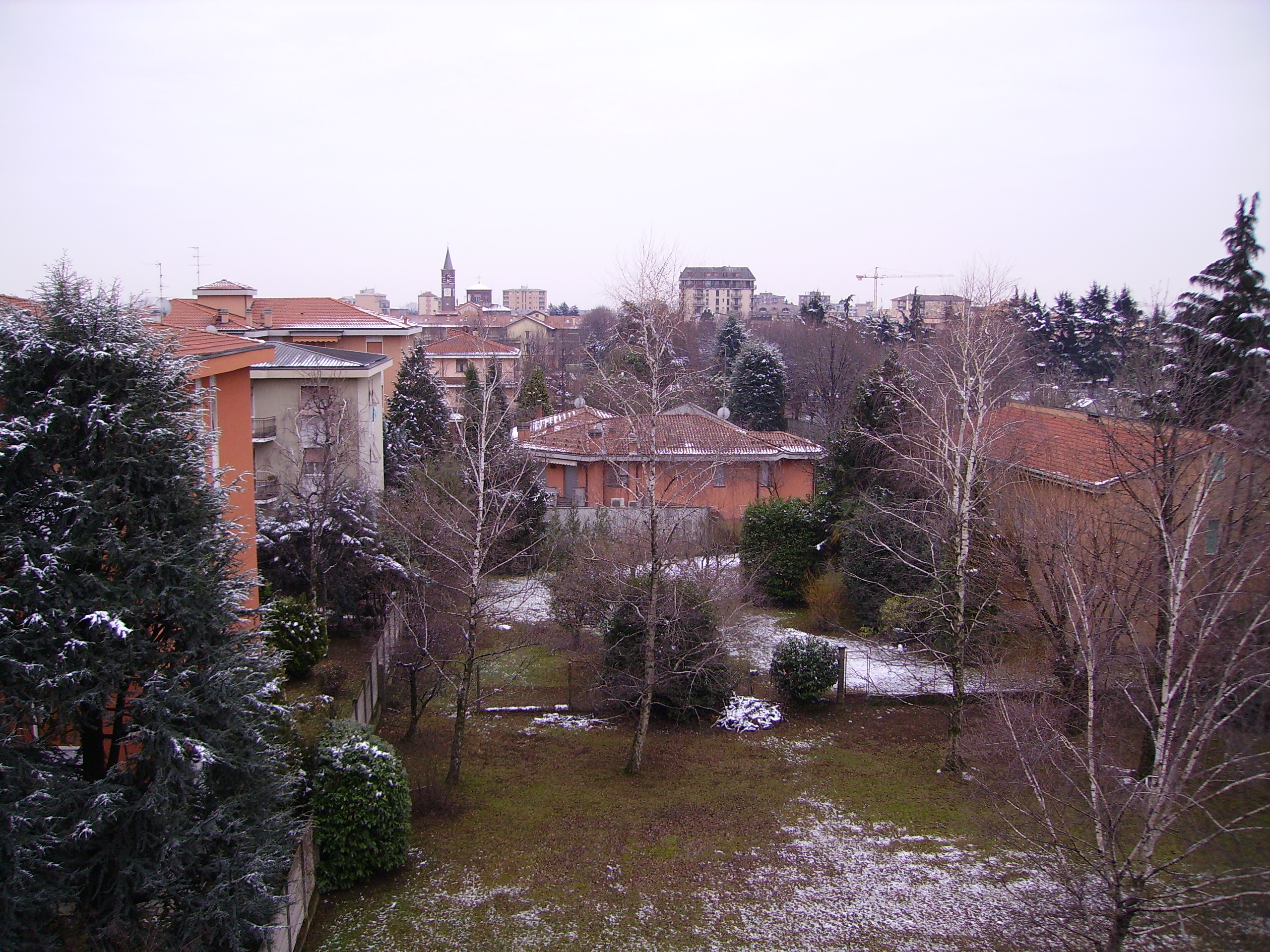
- Muggiò

- Coat of arms

- Location within Italy Location within Lombardy
- Coordinates: 45°36′N 9°14′E
- Country: Italy
- Region: Lombardy
- Province: Monza and Brianza (MB)
- Frazioni: Taccona

Government
  - Mayor: Maria Fiorito

Area
  - Total: 5.48 km^{2} (2.12 sq mi)
- Elevation: 186 m (610 ft)

Population (30 November 2017)
  - Total: 23,583
  - Density: 4,300/km^{2} (11,100/sq mi)
- Demonym: Muggioresi
- Time zone: UTC+1 (CET)
  - Summer (DST): UTC+2 (CEST)
- Postal code: 20835
- Dialing code: 039
- Website: Official website

Muggiò (Italian: [mudˈdʒɔ], Lombard: [myˈdʒɔ]; Milanese: Mugg) is a city (municipality) in the Province of Monza and Brianza in the Italian region Lombardy, located about 15 kilometres (9 mi) northeast of Milan. It was granted the honorary title of city by a presidential decree on September 27, 1992.

Muggiò borders the following municipalities: Lissone, Desio, Monza, Nova Milanese, and Cinisello Balsamo.

== History ==
=== Name ===
It is believed that the original name of the city of Muggiò might derive from the Latin adjective "metulatus", from "metula", in turn a diminutive of the Latin word "meta", meaning height or mound, indicating its undulating conformation. The city's diverse etymology, acquired over the centuries, is evident in ancient writings. Ameglao is the first inhabited place to emerge where Muggiò stands today.

== Main sights ==
=== Villa Casati Stampa di Soncino ===
Villa Casati Stampa, now the town hall of Muggiò, is a neoclassical building designed in 1798 by the Austrian architect Leopold Pollack. The residence was built on a pre-existing 16th-century structure. The villa was surrounded by a park of more than twenty thousand square metres of surface (nearly five acres), designed as an English garden. Today, the park has been transformed into a sports ground.

=== Mausoleum of Casati Stampa di Soncino ===
The Mausoleum of Casati Stampa Soncino is a commemorative monument in the urban cemetery of Muggiò, built in 1830.

== Sport ==
The Muggiò football club is Fucina Muggiò, which plays in Eccellenza

== Transport ==
Muggiò is served by Lissone-Muggiò railway station.
