= Briosco =

Briosco Briusch (Lombard)
- Comune
- Comune di Briosco
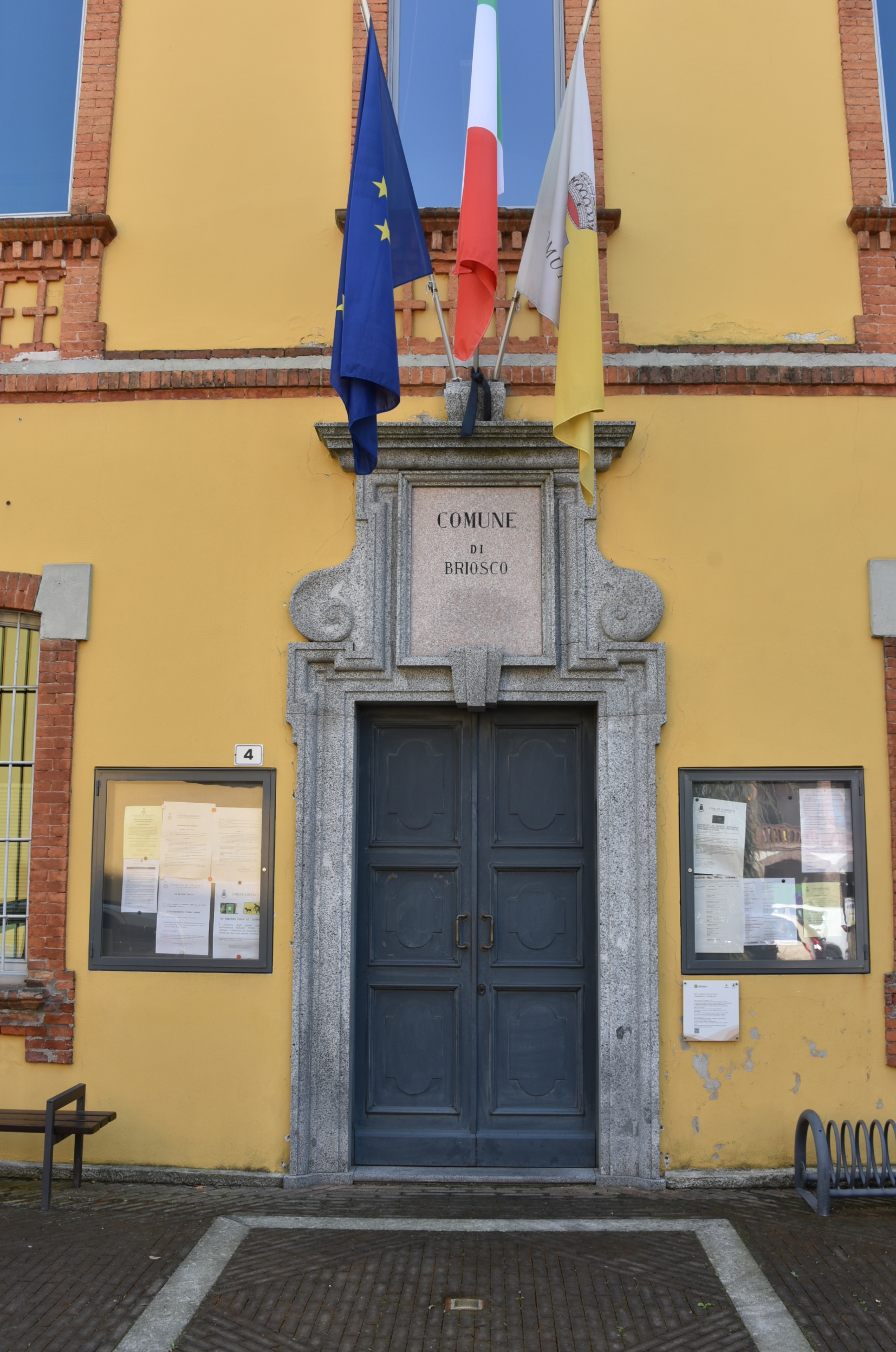
- View of Briosco

- Coat of arms

- Location within Italy Location within Lombardy
- Coordinates: 45°43′N 9°14′E
- Country: Italy
- Region: Lombardy
- Province: Monza and Brianza (MB)

Area
  - Total: 6.6 km^{2} (2.5 sq mi)

Population (Dec. 2004)
  - Total: 5,676
  - Density: 860/km^{2} (2,200/sq mi)
- Demonym: Brioschesi
- Time zone: UTC+1 (CET)
  - Summer (DST): UTC+2 (CEST)
- Postal code: 20836
- Dialing code: 0362
- Website: Official website

Briosco (Brianzöö: Briusch [briˈusk]) is a comune (municipality) in the Province of Monza and Brianza in the Italian region Lombardy, located about 30 kilometres (19 mi) north of Milan. As of 31 December 2004, it had a population of 5,676 and an area of 6.6 square kilometres (2.5 mi^{2}).

Under the comune, lie two fraction: Capriano and the historical and cultural site of Fornaci. Briosco borders the following municipalities: Inverigo, Veduggio con Colzano, Renate, Besana in Brianza, Giussano, Carate Brianza, Verano Brianza.

== Demographic evolution ==
Historical population

Year	Pop.	±%
1861	2,450	—
1871	2,659	+8.5%
1881	2,879	+8.3%
1901	3,103	+7.8%
1911	3,244	+4.5%

Year	Pop.	±%
1921	3,110	−4.1%
1931	3,145	+1.1%
1936	3,178	+1.0%
1951	3,524	+10.9%
1961	4,091	+16.1%

Year	Pop.	±%
1971	4,229	+3.4%
1981	4,850	+14.7%
1991	5,252	+8.3%
2001	5,615	+6.9%

Source: Data from ISTAT

== Sport ==
The Associazione Sportiva Dilettantistica Brioschese, commonly known as Brioschese, is an amateur football club based in Briosco. The club's colors are white and red.
