= Ronco Briantino =

- Comune
- Comune di Ronco Briantino
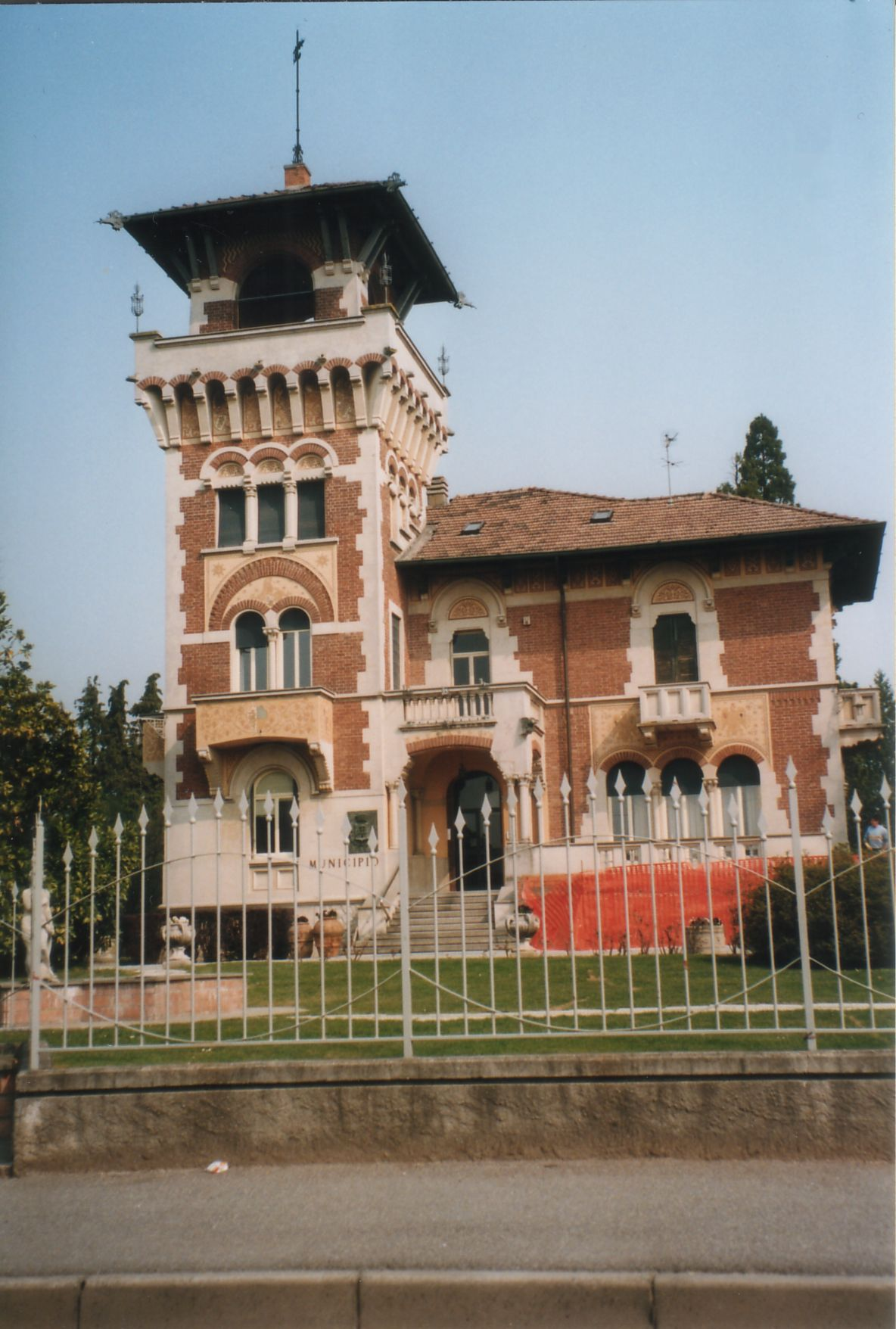
- Town Hall.

- Coat of arms

- Location within Italy Location within Lombardy
- Coordinates: 45°40′N 9°24′E
- Country: Italy
- Region: Lombardy
- Province: Monza and Brianza (MB)

Government
  - Mayor: Francesco Antonio Colombo

Area
  - Total: 3.0 km^{2} (1.2 sq mi)

Population (Dec. 2004)
  - Total: 3,216
  - Density: 1,100/km^{2} (2,800/sq mi)
- Demonym: Ronchesi
- Time zone: UTC+1 (CET)
  - Summer (DST): UTC+2 (CEST)
- Postal code: 20885
- Dialing code: 039
- Website: Official website

Ronco Briantino (Milanese: Ronc) is a comune (municipality) in the Province of Monza and Brianza in the Italian region Lombardy, located about 30 kilometres (19 mi) northeast of Milan.

Ronco Briantino borders the following municipalities: Merate, Robbiate, Osnago, Verderio Inferiore, Bernareggio, Carnate.
