= Province of Monza and Brianza =

Province of Italy, located in the Lombardy region

Coordinates: 45°35′N 9°16′E

Province of Monza and Brianza Provincia di Monza e della Brianza (Italian) Provincia de Monscia e de la Brianza (Lombard)
- Province
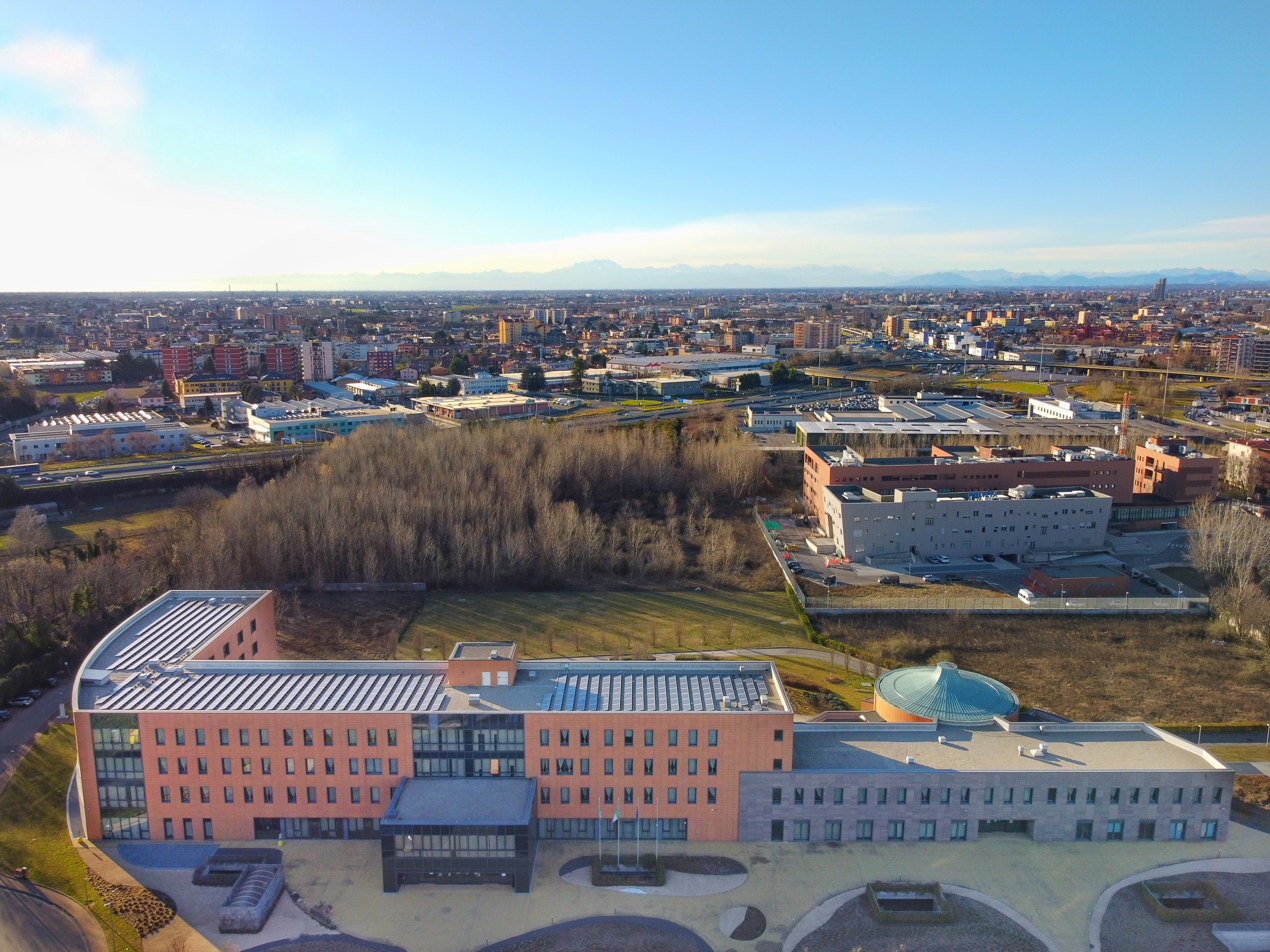
- The polo di via Grigna, the seat of the province

- Flag Coat of arms

- Location of the province of Monza and Brianza in Italy
- Country: Italy
- Region: Lombardy
- Capital(s): Monza
- Municipalities: 55

Government
  - President: Luca Santambrogio (Lega)

Area
  - Total: 405.41 km^{2} (156.53 sq mi)

Population (2026)
  - Total: 883,396
  - Density: 2,179.0/km^{2} (5,643.6/sq mi)

GDP (2021)
  - Total: €29,377 billion
  - Per capita: €33,755
  - Total, PPP: $47,579 billion
  - Per capita, PPP: $54,670
- Time zone: UTC+1 (CET)
  - Summer (DST): UTC+2 (CEST)
- Postal code: 20900, 20811-20886
- Telephone prefix: 039, 0362, 02
- Vehicle registration: MB
- ISTAT code: 108

The province of Monza and Brianza (Italian: provincia di Monza e della Brianza; Brianzoeu: provincia de Monscia e de la Brianza) is a province in the region of Lombardy in Italy. Located in the northwest of the region, it is named after its capital and largest city, Monza, and the geographical, historical and cultural area of Brianza in which it is entirely comprised.

It borders the provinces of Lecco and Como to the north, the province of Varese to the west, the province of Bergamo to the east and the Metropolitan City of Milan to the south-east.

It was officially created by splitting the north-eastern part from the province of Milan on 12 May 2004, and became executive after the provincial elections of 6 and 7 June 2009.

With a population of 883,396 in an area of 405.41 square kilometres (156.53 sq mi) across its 55 municipalities, it is the 3rd-smallest province of Italy, as well as the 2nd most densely populated, given by its heavily urbanized territory that is part of the urban area of Milan.

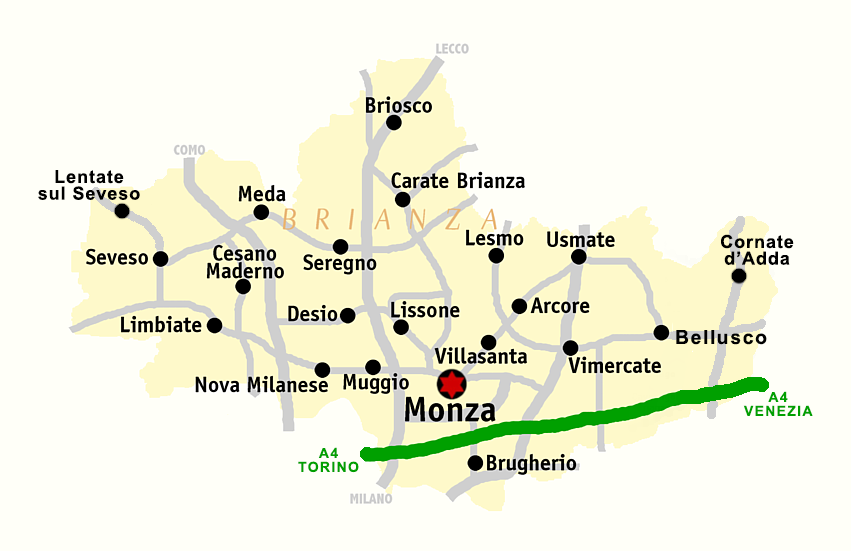
Detailed map of the province

Historical regions of the province

== Government ==
=== List of presidents ===
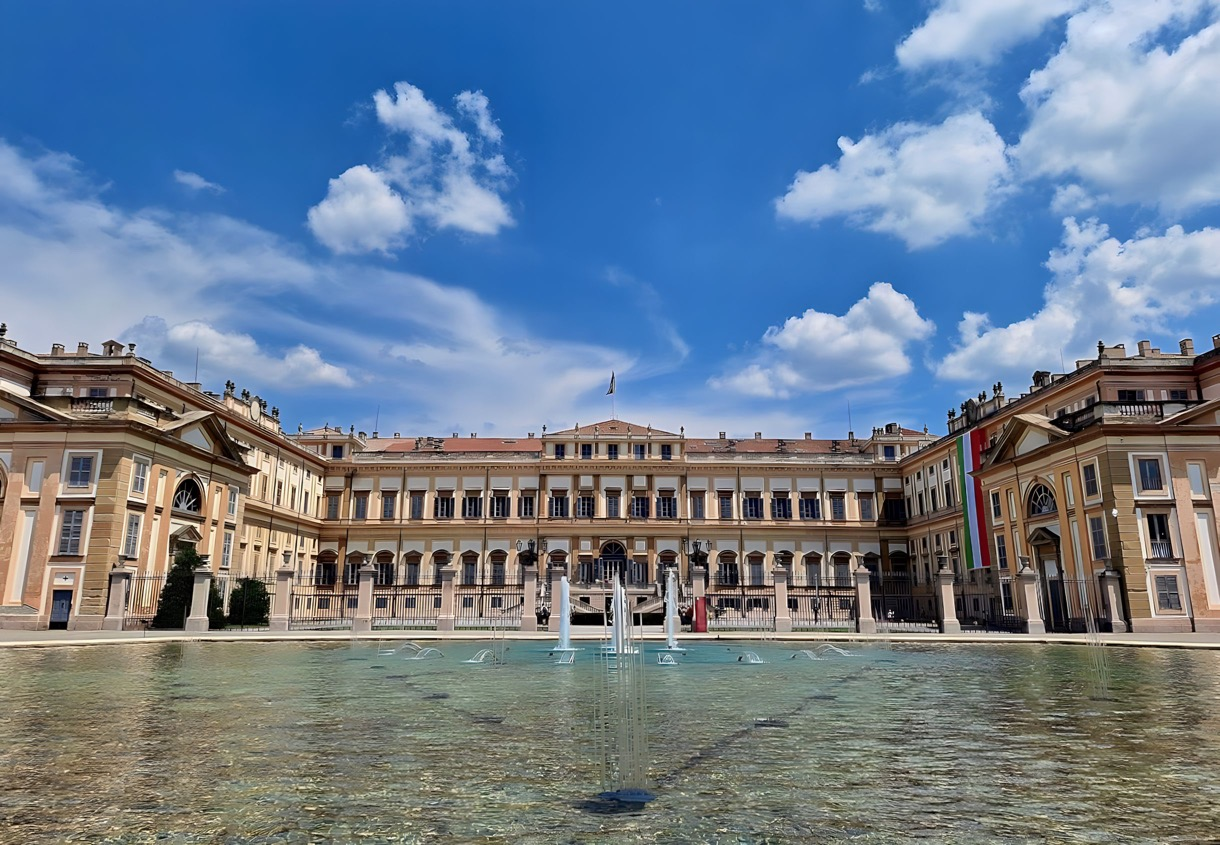
Royal Villa of Monza

=== Municipalities ===
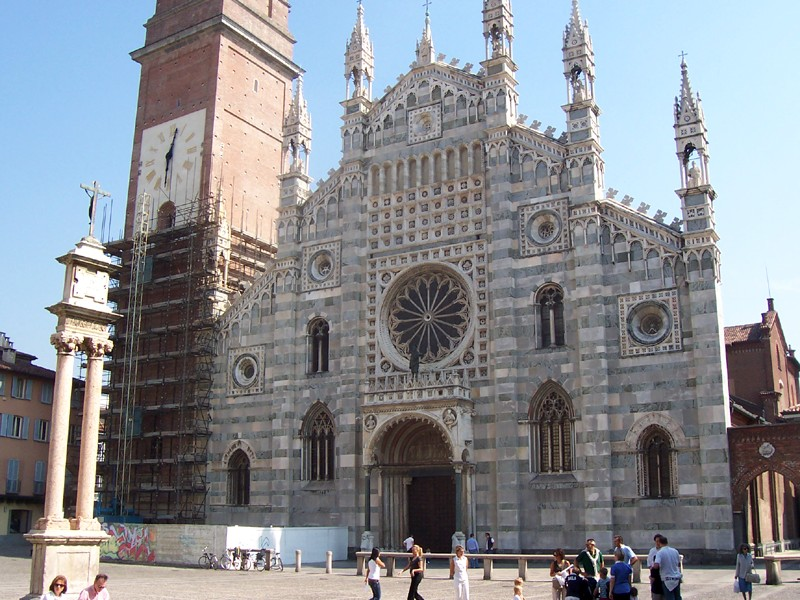
Duomo of Monza

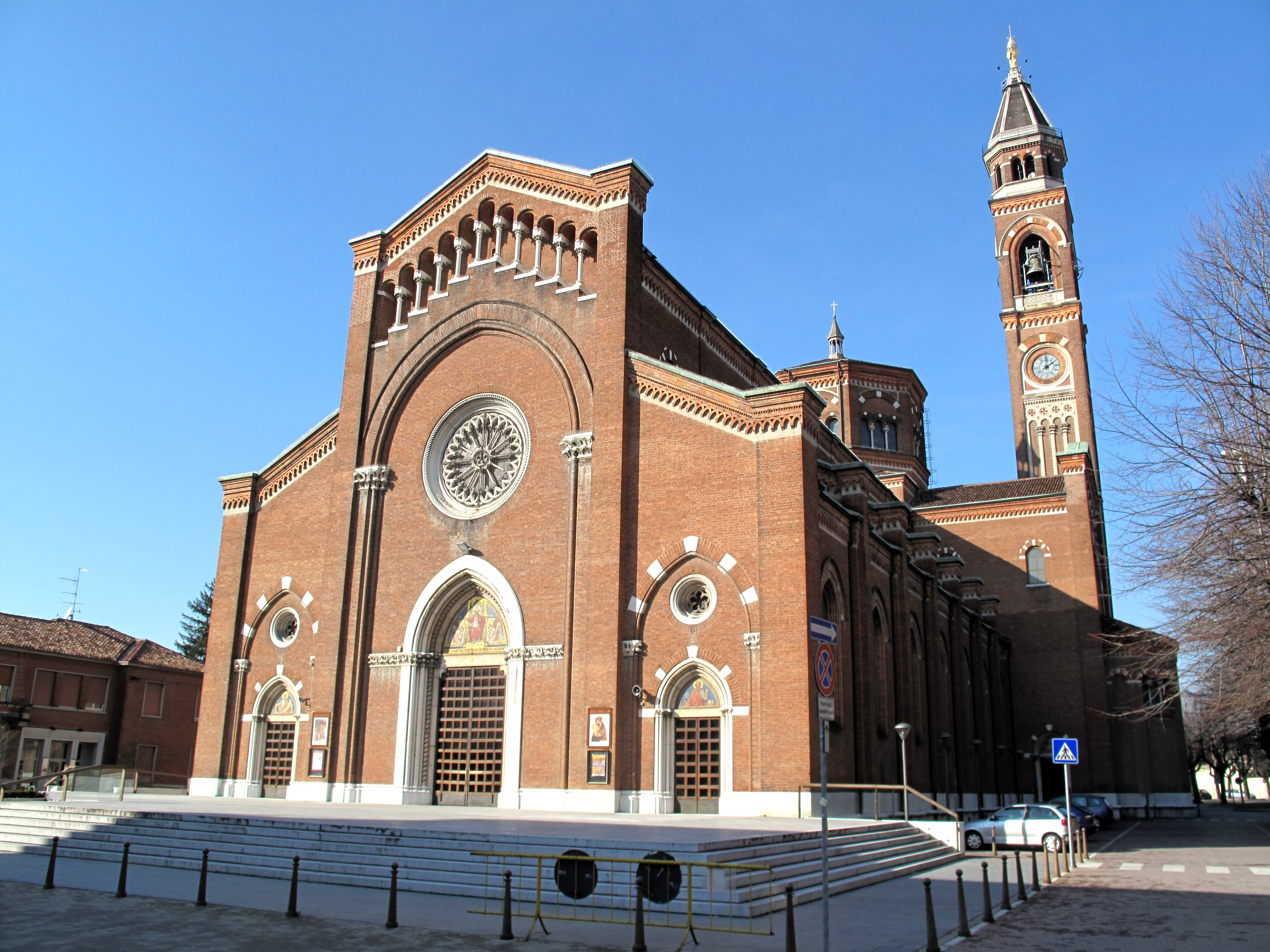
Lissone

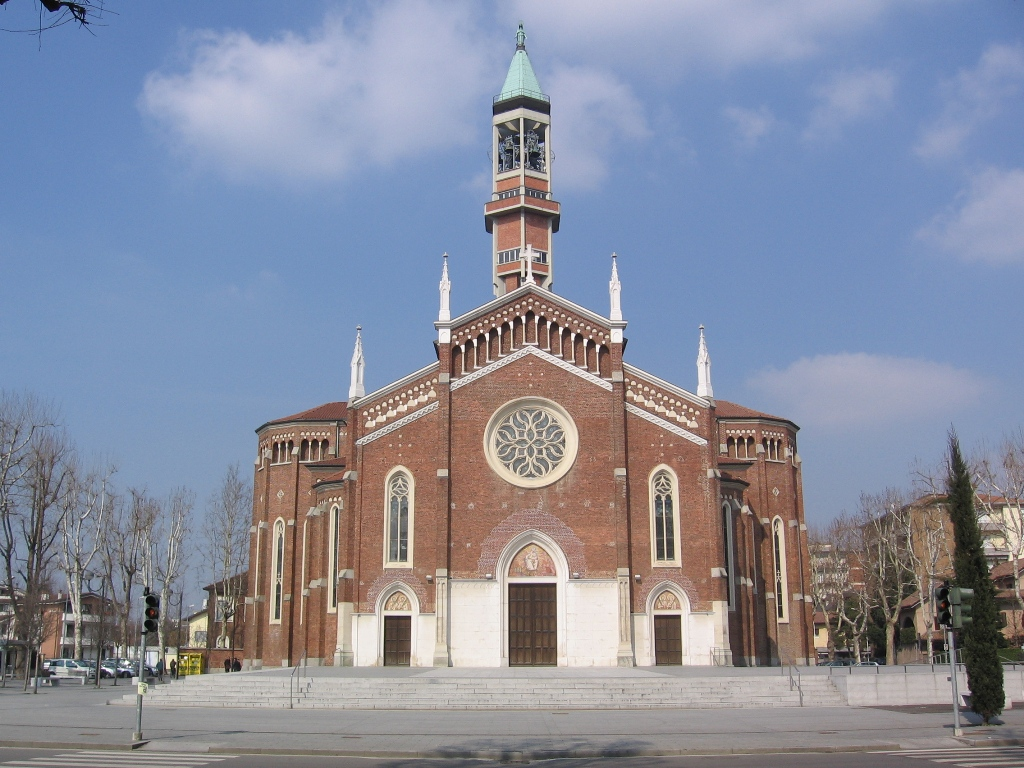
Seregno

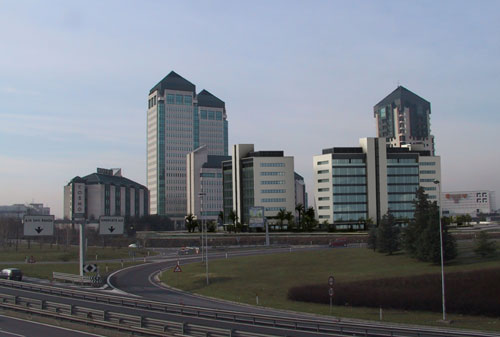
White Towers (Torri Bianche) Vimercate

The province has 55 municipalities:

- Agrate Brianza
- Aicurzio
- Albiate
- Arcore
- Barlassina
- Bellusco
- Bernareggio
- Besana in Brianza
- Biassono
- Bovisio-Masciago
- Briosco
- Brugherio
- Burago di Molgora
- Busnago
- Camparada
- Caponago
- Carate Brianza
- Carnate
- Cavenago di Brianza
- Ceriano Laghetto
- Cesano Maderno
- Cogliate
- Concorezzo
- Cornate d'Adda
- Correzzana
- Desio
- Giussano
- Lazzate
- Lentate sul Seveso
- Lesmo
- Limbiate
- Lissone
- Macherio
- Meda
- Mezzago
- Misinto
- Monza
- Muggiò
- Nova Milanese
- Ornago
- Renate
- Roncello
- Ronco Briantino
- Seregno
- Seveso
- Sovico
- Sulbiate
- Triuggio
- Usmate Velate
- Varedo
- Vedano al Lambro
- Veduggio con Colzano
- Verano Brianza
- Villasanta
- Vimercate

== Demographics ==
As of 2026, the population is 883,396, of which 49.2% are male, and 50.8% are female. Minors make up 15.2% of the population, and seniors make up 24.2%.

Historical population

Year	Pop.	±%
1861	144,484	—
1871	157,687	+9.1%
1881	169,618	+7.6%
1901	227,548	+34.2%
1911	270,898	+19.1%
1921	284,651	+5.1%
1931	323,173	+13.5%
1936	338,507	+4.7%

Year	Pop.	±%
1951	395,030	+16.7%
1961	489,305	+23.9%
1971	640,545	+30.9%
1981	699,516	+9.2%
1991	729,347	+4.3%
2001	766,631	+5.1%
2011	840,129	+9.6%
2021	870,407	+3.6%

Source: ISTAT

=== Immigration ===
As of 2025, immigrants make up 11.6% of the population. The 5 largest foreign countries of birth are Romania, Albania, Morocco, Ukraine, and Egypt.

== Transport ==
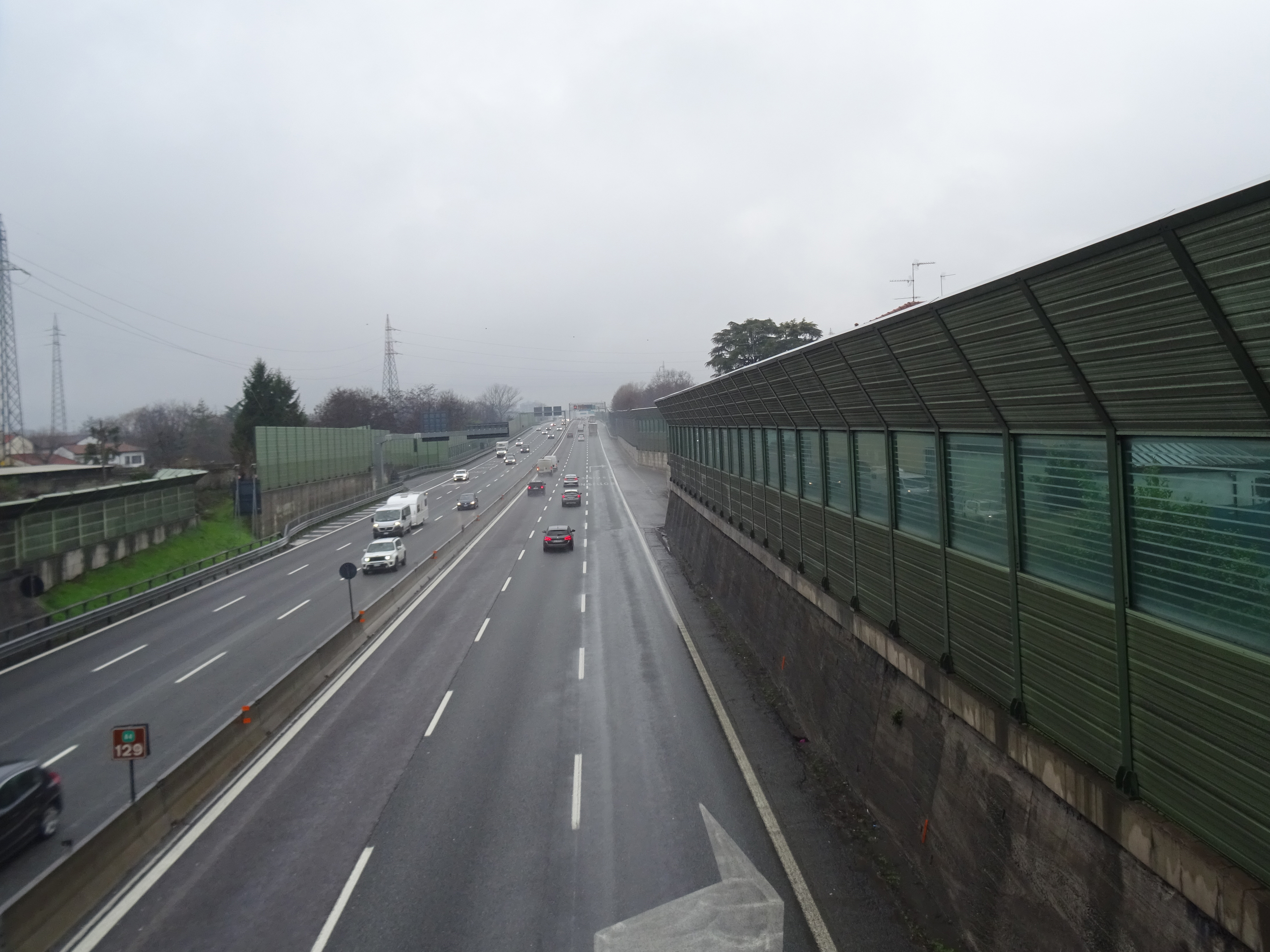
Autostrada A4 near Monza

=== Motorways ===
- Autostrada A4: Milan-Venice
- Autostrada A36: Cassano Magnago-Lentate sul Seveso
- Autostrada A51: Beltway around Milan
- Autostrada A52: Beltway around Milan
- Autostrada A58: Beltway around Milan

=== Railway lines ===
- Milan–Asso railway
- Milan–Chiasso railway
- Saronno–Seregno railway
- Seregno–Bergamo railway
