= Biassono =

Biassono Biassòn (Lombard)
- Comune
- Comune di Biassono
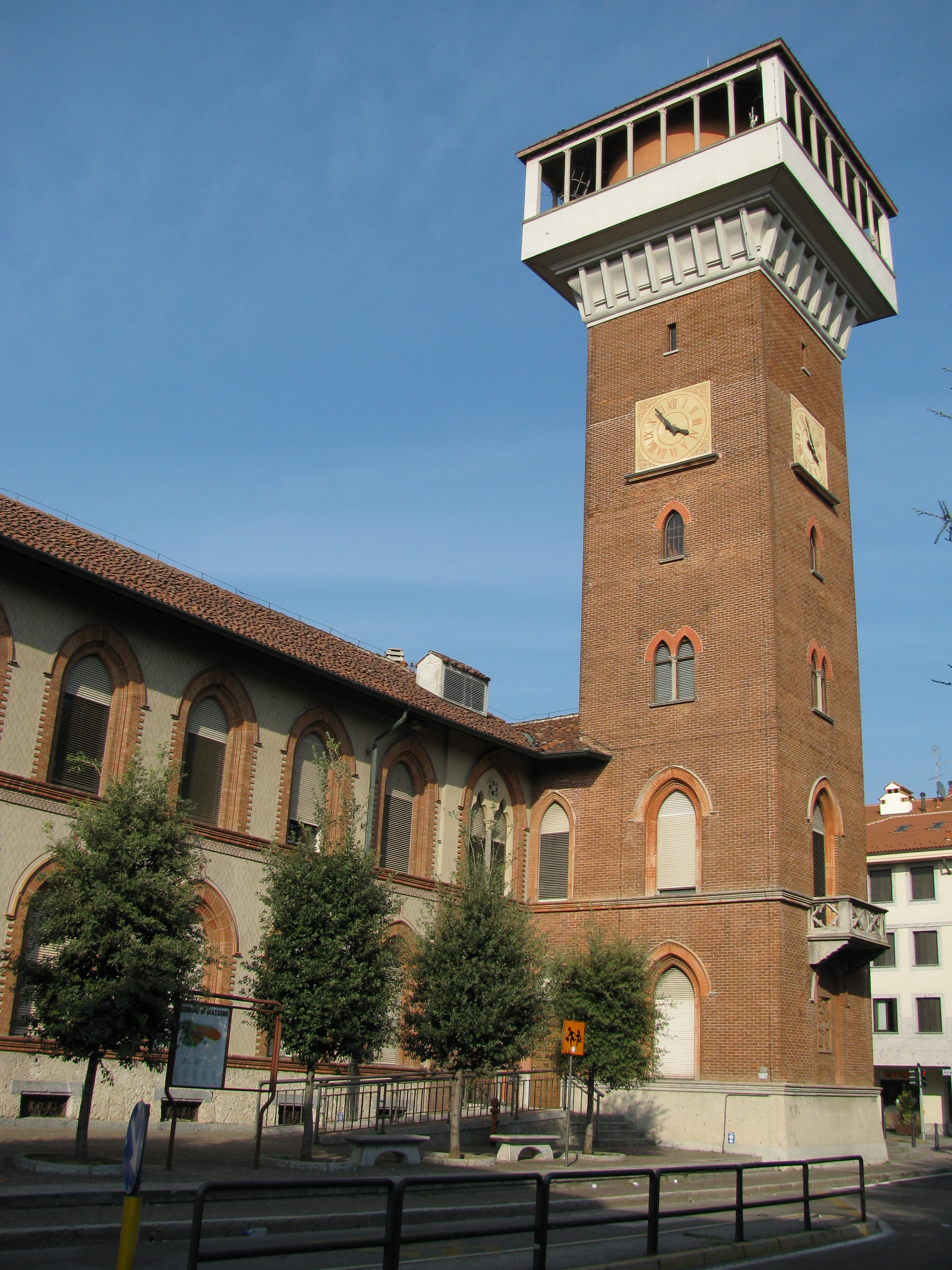
- Aqueduct Tower

- Coat of arms

- Location within Italy Location within Lombardy
- Coordinates: 45°38′N 9°16′E
- Country: Italy
- Region: Lombardy
- Province: Monza and Brianza (MB)
- Frazioni: San Giorgio al Lambro

Government
  - Mayor: Luciano Casiraghi (Lega Nord)

Area
  - Total: 4.8 km^{2} (1.9 sq mi)
- Elevation: 191 m (627 ft)

Population (2009)
  - Total: 11,776
  - Density: 2,500/km^{2} (6,400/sq mi)
- Demonym: Biassonesi
- Time zone: UTC+1 (CET)
  - Summer (DST): UTC+2 (CEST)
- Postal code: 20853
- Dialing code: 039
- Patron saint: St. Martin
- Saint day: Third Monday in September
- Website: www.biassono.org

Biassono (Brianzöö: Biassòn) is a comune (municipality) in the Province of Monza and Brianza in the Italian region Lombardy, located about 20 kilometres (12 mi) northeast of Milan.

Biassono borders the following municipalities: Lesmo, Arcore, Macherio, Lissone, Monza, Vedano al Lambro, Villasanta.

Biassono is noteworthy because of its location situated to the northwest of the Autodromo Nazionale Monza, constructed in the park of Monza's Royal Villa. It opened in 1922, making it the oldest Grand Prix venue that the FIA Formula One World Championship still uses for the annual Gran Premio d'Italia.

Biassono is crossed by the Lambro river in San Giorgio al Lambro, a small suburb of the municipality.

== Museum ==
- The Museum "Carlo Verri" is located in the Verri Palace; it also service as a library and the town hall.

== Sports ==
The Associazione Calcio Dilettantistica Biassono is an amateur football club founded in 1950 and based in Biassono. Currently, the team competes in the Promozione Lombardia for the 2026-2027 season.

== Twin towns ==
- Minusio, Switzerland, since 2010
