= Veduggio con Colzano =

- Comune
- Comune di Veduggio con Colzano
- Coat of arms

- Location within Italy Location within Lombardy
- Coordinates: 45°44′N 9°16′E
- Country: Italy
- Region: Lombardy
- Province: Monza and Brianza (MB)

Government
  - Mayor: Gerardo Fumagalli

Area
  - Total: 3.5 km^{2} (1.4 sq mi)
- Elevation: 305 m (1,001 ft)

Population (Dec. 2004)
  - Total: 4,368
  - Density: 1,200/km^{2} (3,200/sq mi)
- Time zone: UTC+1 (CET)
  - Summer (DST): UTC+2 (CEST)
- Postal code: 20837
- Dialing code: 0362
- Website: Official website

Veduggio con Colzano (Milanese: Vedugg) is a comune (municipality) in the Province of Monza and Brianza in the Italian region Lombardy, located about 30 kilometres (19 mi) north of Milan.
