= Aicurzio =

Aicurzio Icurz (Lombard)
- Comune
- Comune di Aicurzio
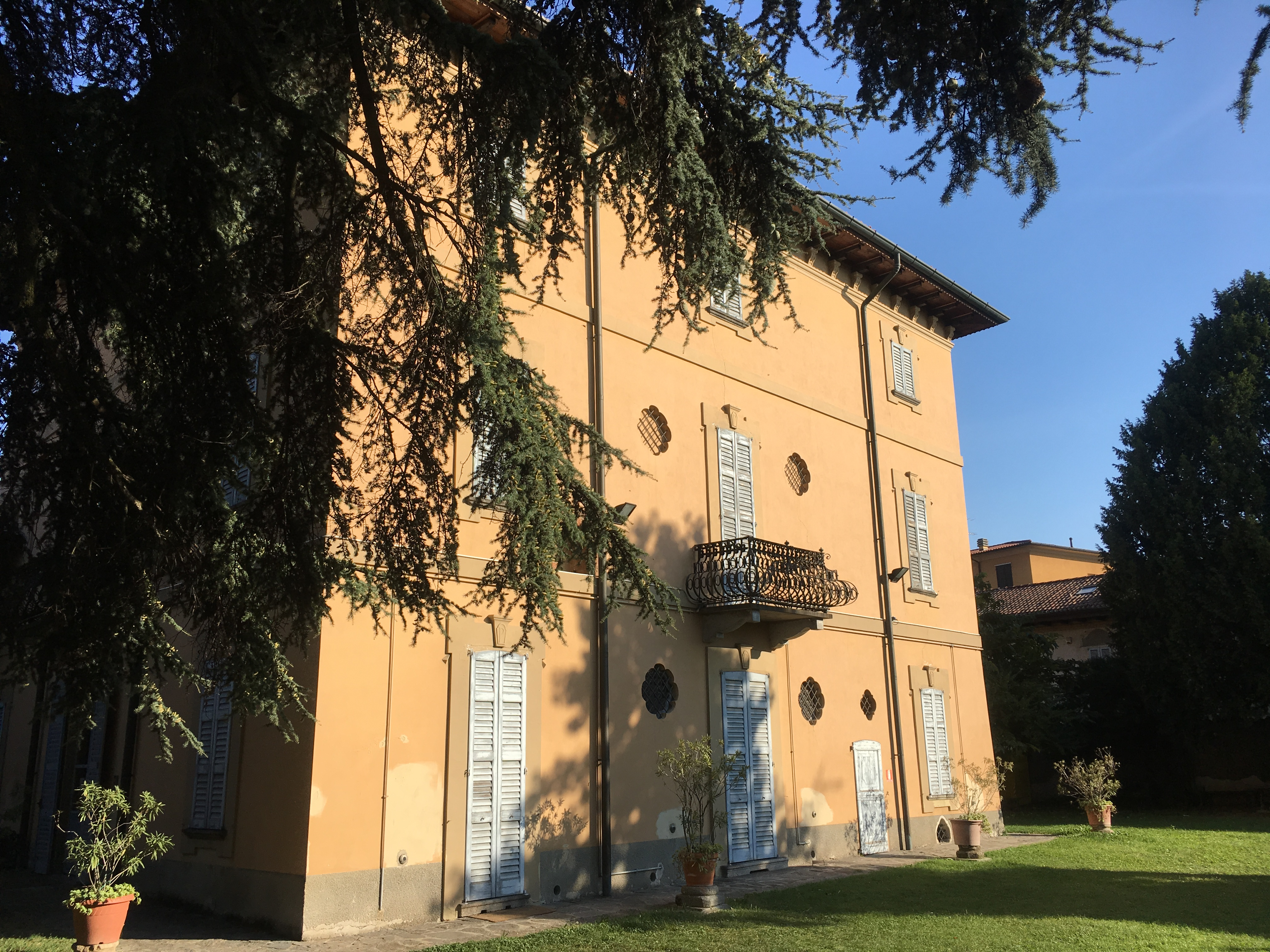
- View of Aicurzio

- Coat of arms

- Location of Aicurzio in Italy Aicurzio (Lombardy)
- Coordinates: 45°38′N 9°25′E
- Country: Italy
- Region: Lombardy
- Province: Monza and Brianza (MB)

Government
  - Mayor: Matteo Raffaele Baraggia

Area
  - Total: 2.5 km^{2} (0.97 sq mi)
- Elevation: 235 m (771 ft)

Population (30 April 2017)
  - Total: 2,118
  - Density: 850/km^{2} (2,200/sq mi)
- Demonym: Aicurziesi
- Time zone: UTC+1 (CET)
  - Summer (DST): UTC+2 (CEST)
- Postal code: 20886
- Dialing code: 039
- Website: Official website

Aicurzio (Brianzöö: Icurz) is a comune (municipality) in the Province of Monza and Brianza in the Italian region Lombardy, located about 25 kilometres (16 mi) northeast of Milan.
