= Villasanta =

- Comune
- Comune di Villasanta
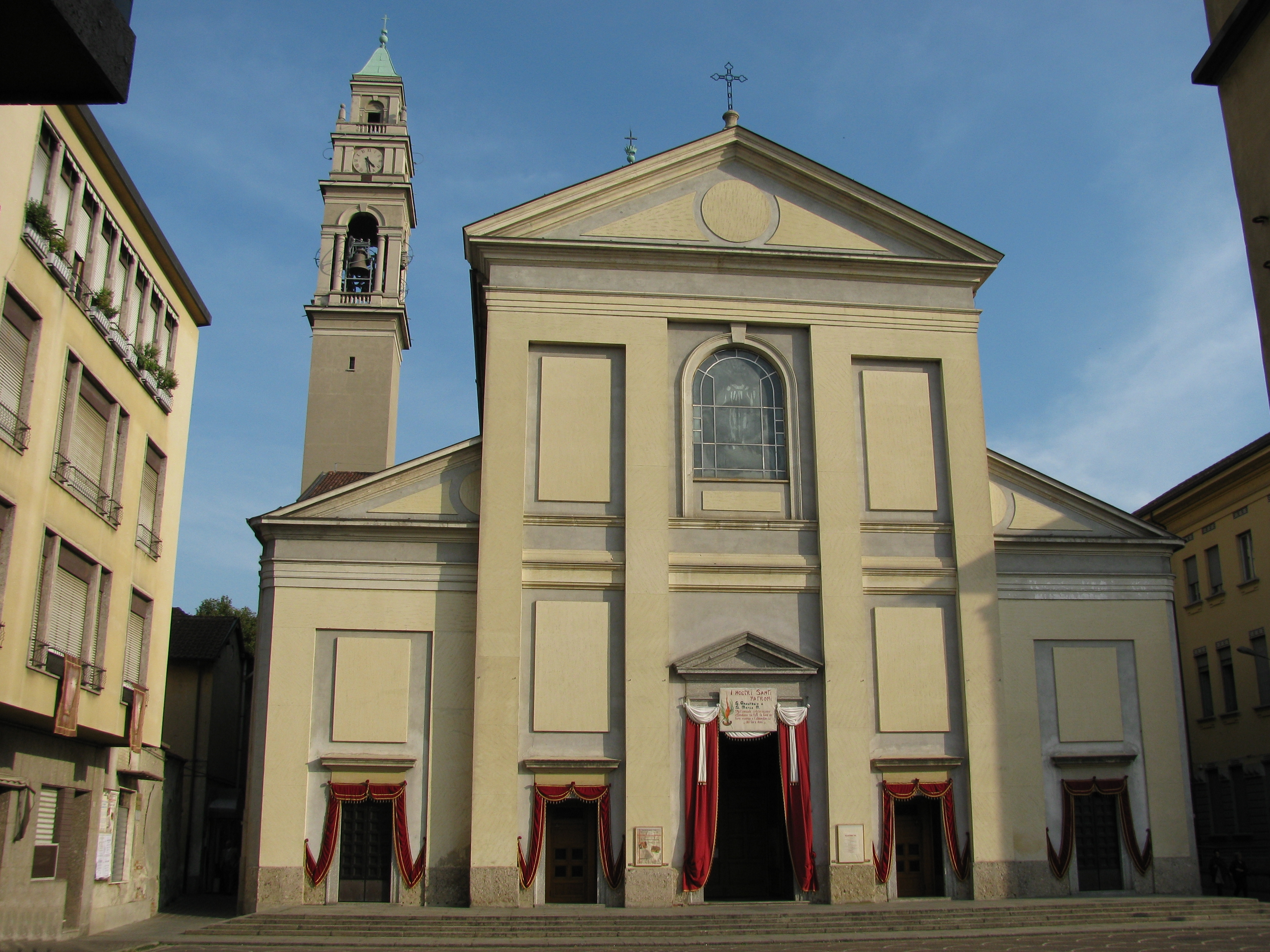
- Church of St. Anastasia

- Coat of arms

- Location within Italy Location within Lombardy
- Coordinates: 45°36′N 9°18′E
- Country: Italy
- Region: Lombardy
- Province: Monza and Brianza (MB)
- Frazioni: La Santa (communal seat), San Fiorano e Sant'Alessandro

Government
  - Mayor: Emilio Merlo

Area
  - Total: 4.9 km^{2} (1.9 sq mi)
- Elevation: 173 m (568 ft)

Population (31 December 2007)
  - Total: 13,480
  - Density: 2,800/km^{2} (7,100/sq mi)
- Demonym: Villasantesi
- Time zone: UTC+1 (CET)
  - Summer (DST): UTC+2 (CEST)
- Postal code: 20852
- Dialing code: 039
- Website: Official website

Villasanta (La Santa) is a comune (municipality) in the Province of Monza and Brianza in the Italian region Lombardy, located about 20 kilometres (12 mi) northeast of Milan.

Villasanta borders the following municipalities: Arcore, Biassono, Monza, Concorezzo.

The comune of Villa San Fiorano existed from the 14th century until 1757.

== History ==
It is believed that the original core of the town center emerged during the Roman era, serving as a resting place along the road from Milan and Monza to Olginate, at the junction leading to Vimercate.

The existence of the church dedicated to Saint Anastasia is confirmed by a document from AD 768, though its founding is likely much older. According to historian Oleg Zastrow, who conducted a study on the parish's history, the church can be dated to the time of Theodoric the Great (c. 500) or earlier.

Another document confirms the presence, in 961, of the church and attached hospice (in Latin, xenodochium) of Saint Alexander in the area where the homonymous district now stands. The hospice operated for several centuries, likely abandoned c. 1300.

The settlement that developed around the church of Saint Anastasia adopted its name over the centuries, first known as the "Place of the Saint," and later simply "La Santa." The areas corresponding to the districts of Sant'Alessandro and San Fiorano were called Villola or Coliate in medieval documents and later Villa.

In 1578, the church of Saint Anastasia, which until then had been dependent on the Monza Cathedral, was elevated to a parish by Saint Charles Borromeo, Archbishop of Milan. The parish encompassed the entire municipal territory, though it remained administratively divided: La Santa continued to be part of Monza, while Villa became a separate municipality named Villa San Fiorano. In 1791, the municipality of Villa San Fiorano remained under the jurisdiction of the Monza court, part of the XIII "censual district" of the province of Milan.

In 1928, La Santa was separated from Monza and merged with Villa San Fiorano. Since it constituted a significant part of the new municipality, in 1929, the name was changed to Villasanta, a fusion of the two original names.

=== Symbols ===
Per fess: in the 1st, argent, a watermelon proper placed in fess; in the 2nd, argent, three bends sable, charged in the center with a seated dog, argent; on the partition, a red fess, charged on the right with a horse bit, argent, and on the left with three rings interlaced, proper.

The elements in the coat of arms are taken from the heraldry of three ancient families. The watermelon or melon refers to the Mellerio family; the silver and black stripes and the dog are symbols of the Taverna family; the fess with a horse bit and three rings refers to the Somaglia family.

The gonfalon is a split drape of blue and green.

== See also ==
- Kuota
- Villasanta Parco railway station
