= Giussano =

Giussano Giussan (Lombard)
- Comune
- Città di Giussano
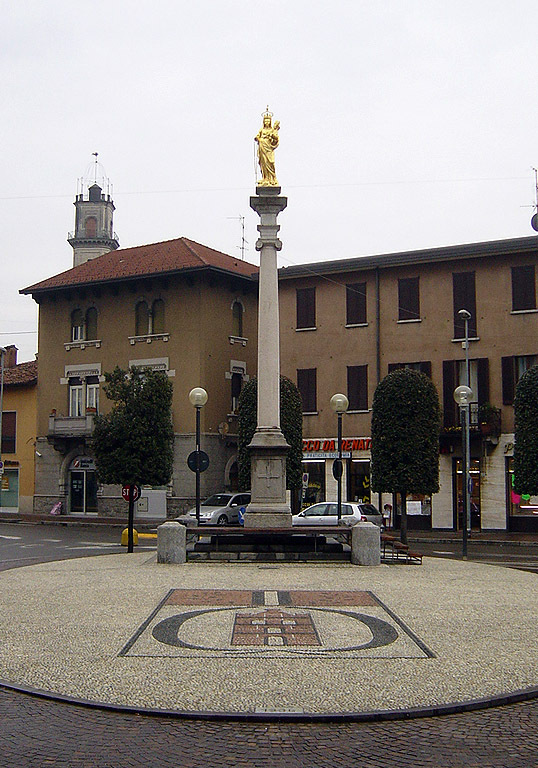

- Coat of arms

- Location within Italy Location within Lombardy
- Coordinates: 45°42′N 9°13′E
- Country: Italy
- Region: Lombardy
- Province: Monza and Brianza (MB)
- Frazioni: Paina, Birone, Robbiano, Brugazzo

Government
  - Mayor: Marco Citterio

Area
  - Total: 10.3 km^{2} (4.0 sq mi)
- Elevation: 269 m (883 ft)

Population (30 November 2017)
  - Total: 25,916
  - Density: 2,520/km^{2} (6,520/sq mi)
- Demonym: Giussanesi
- Time zone: UTC+1 (CET)
  - Summer (DST): UTC+2 (CEST)
- Postal code: 20833
- Dialing code: 0362
- Website: Official website

Giussano (Brianzoeu: Giussan [dʒyˈsãː]) is a comune (municipality) in the province of Monza and Brianza, in the Italian region Lombardy, located about 25 kilometres (16 mi) north of Milan.

Giussano borders the following municipalities: Inverigo, Carugo, Arosio, Briosco, Mariano Comense, Carate Brianza, Verano Brianza, Seregno.

Giussano received the honorary title of city with a presidential decree on 22 October 1987.

== Sport ==
Founded in 2012 by a group of seven young residents of Giussano, ASD Giussano Calcio is an amateur football club competing in the Seconda Categoria, Group R of Monza and Brianza. The major football team of Giussano is Vis Nova Giussano, which is competing in Eccellenza

== See also ==
- Alberto da Giussano
- Giussano-class cruiser
