= Nova Milanese =

- Comune
- Comune di Nova Milanese
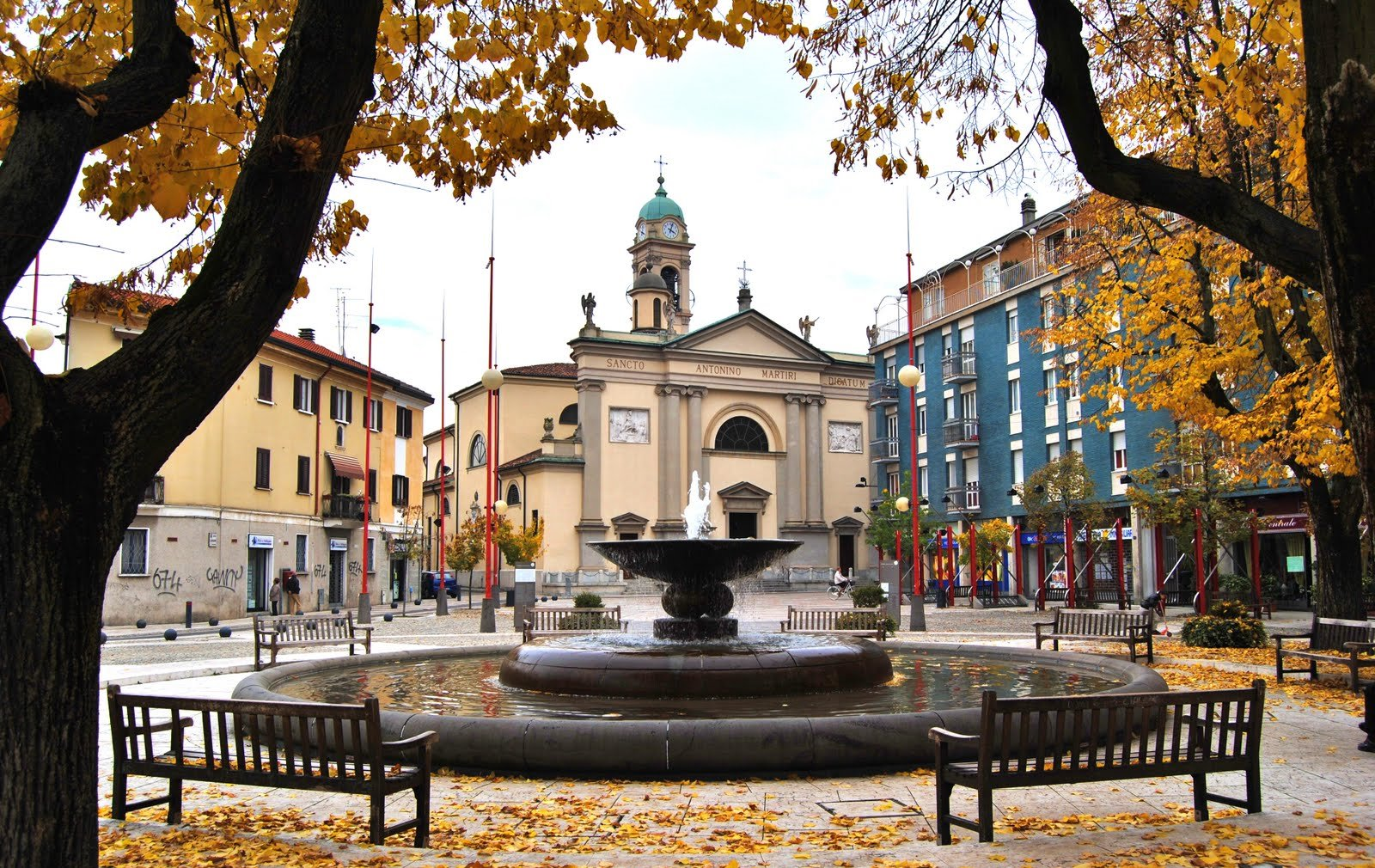

- Coat of arms

- Location within Italy Location within Lombardy
- Coordinates: 45°35′N 9°12′E
- Country: Italy
- Region: Lombardy
- Province: Monza and Brianza (MB)

Government
  - Mayor: Fabrizio Pagani

Area
  - Total: 5.85 km^{2} (2.26 sq mi)
- Elevation: 175 m (574 ft)

Population (30 November 2017)
  - Total: 23,324
  - Density: 3,990/km^{2} (10,300/sq mi)
- Demonym: Novesi
- Time zone: UTC+1 (CET)
  - Summer (DST): UTC+2 (CEST)
- Postal code: 20834
- Dialing code: 0362
- Website: Official website

Nova Milanese is a comune (municipality) in the Province of Monza and Brianza in the Italian region Lombardy, located about 15 kilometres (9 mi) north of Milan. It received the honorary title of city with a presidential decree. Nova Milanese borders the following municipalities: Cinisello Balsamo, Desio, Muggiò, Paderno Dugnano, Varedo.

== History ==
An ancient route connected Milan to Carate Brianza through the city and because the location was 14 kilometres (9 mi) from Milan it was called Nova Milanese (nine is nove in Italian).

At the beginning of the 20th century the main economic activity was the breeding of silkworms. This continued until the 1920s when there was the advent of synthetic fibers. In addition to the soil grains, it produced excellent grapes, in fact Nova Milanese appears along with 20 other countries as the best producer of wine in the ranking by the Milanese poet Carlo Porta in 1815.

== Sport ==
There are three soccer clubs in the city: Polisportiva di Nova, ASD San Carlo Nova, and Novese Gunners.

Polisportiva di Nova plays in the Lombardy Prima Categoria, Group B.

San Carlo Nova plays in the Open Eccellenza league of the CSI Milano.

Novese Gunners plays in the Metropolitan City of Milan Terza Categoria, Group B.
