= Bernareggio =

Bernareggio Bernaregg (Lombard)
- Comune
- Comune di Bernareggio
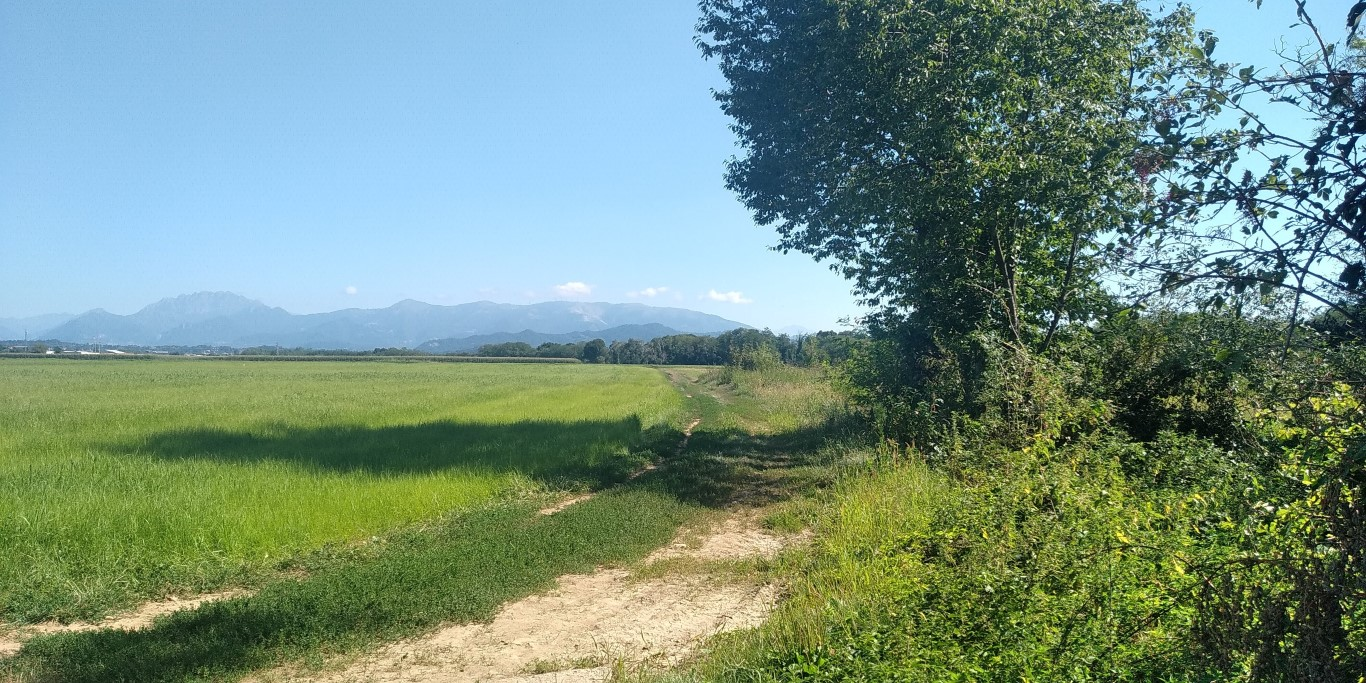
- View of Bernareggio

- Coat of arms

- Location within Italy Location within Lombardy
- Coordinates: 45°39′N 9°24′E
- Country: Italy
- Region: Lombardy
- Province: Monza and Brianza (MB)

Government
  - Mayor: Andrea Esposito

Area
  - Total: 5.9 km^{2} (2.3 sq mi)

Population (19 July 2007)
  - Total: 9,485
  - Density: 1,600/km^{2} (4,200/sq mi)
- Time zone: UTC+1 (CET)
  - Summer (DST): UTC+2 (CEST)
- Postal code: 20881
- Dialing code: 039
- Website: Official website

Bernareggio (Brianzöö: Bernaregg) is a comune (municipality) in the Province of Monza e Brianza in the Italian region Lombardy, located about 25 kilometres (16 mi) northeast of Milan.

== Twin towns ==
- Wachtberg, Germany
- La Villedieu-du-Clain, France
- Michendorf, Germany
