= Bellusco =

Bellusco Belösch (Lombard)
- Comune
- Comune di Bellusco
- Coat of arms

- Location within Italy Location within Lombardy
- Coordinates: 45°37′N 9°25′E
- Country: Italy
- Region: Lombardy
- Province: Monza and Brianza (MB)
- Frazioni: San Nazzaro, Camuzzago, Cascina San Giuseppe

Government
  - Mayor: Mauro Colombo

Area
  - Total: 6.5 km^{2} (2.5 sq mi)
- Elevation: 214 m (702 ft)

Population (31 March 2018)
  - Total: 7,401
  - Density: 1,100/km^{2} (2,900/sq mi)
- Demonym: Belluschesi
- Time zone: UTC+1 (CET)
  - Summer (DST): UTC+2 (CEST)
- Postal code: 20882
- Dialing code: 039
- Website: Official website

Bellusco (Brianzöö: Belösch) is a comune (municipality) in the Province of Monza and Brianza in the Italian region Lombardy, located about 25 kilometres (16 mi) northeast of Milan.
