= Ornago =

- Comune
- Comune di Ornago
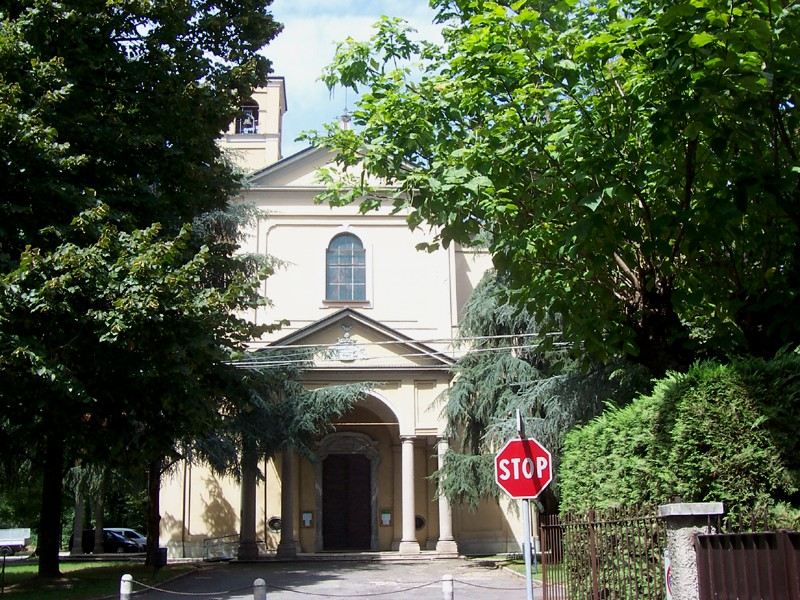

- Coat of arms

- Location within Italy Location within Lombardy
- Coordinates: 45°36′N 9°25′E
- Country: Italy
- Region: Lombardy
- Province: Monza and Brianza (MB)

Government
  - Mayor: Maurizia Emanuela Erba

Area
  - Total: 5.8 km^{2} (2.2 sq mi)

Population (Dec. 2004)
  - Total: 3,730
  - Density: 640/km^{2} (1,700/sq mi)
- Time zone: UTC+1 (CET)
  - Summer (DST): UTC+2 (CEST)
- Postal code: 20876
- Dialing code: 039
- Website: Official website

Ornago is a comune (municipality) in the Province of Monza and Brianza in the Italian region Lombardy, located about 25 kilometres (16 mi) northeast of Milan.
