= Suisio =

- Comune
- Comune di Suisio
- Coat of arms

- Location within Italy Location within Lombardy
- Coordinates: 45°39′N 9°30′E
- Country: Italy
- Region: Lombardy
- Province: Province of Bergamo (BG)

Area
  - Total: 4.59 km^{2} (1.77 sq mi)
- Elevation: 234 m (768 ft)

Population (31 December 2019)
  - Total: 3,794
  - Density: 827/km^{2} (2,140/sq mi)
- Time zone: UTC+1 (CET)
  - Summer (DST): UTC+2 (CEST)
- Postal code: 24040
- ISTAT code: 016209
- Website: http://www.comune.suisio.bg.it/

Suisio (Bergamasque: Süìs) is a municipality in the Italian region of Lombardy, located about 35 kilometres (22 mi) northeast of Milan and about 20 (12 mi) kilometers west of Bergamo. It had a population of 3 794 inhabitants and an area of 4.6 square kilometres (1.8 mi^{2}).

Suisio borders the following municipalities: Bottanuco, Chignolo d'Isola, Cornate d'Adda, Medolago.

== Etymology of the name ==
The name "Suisio" appears for the first time in a document in the 879 C.E but it's not mentioned the original name written in the document. To reproduce the evolution of the toponym, it is necessary to talk about the Corografia Bergomense (1880) that collects, in a chronological order, all the documents which cite the different municipalities in the province of Bergamo. Under the name Suisio, it is mentioned: SEVISIO (879 C.E.), SEVIXIO (980 C.E.), SOVISIO (1058 C.E.), SOVIXIO (1088 C.E.). The conclusion was that the most common forms found in the documents after 1260 C.E. are Sovixio and Sovisio. Another form which is very important is in the code 1387 in the Vatican apostolic library, the so-called "Fondo Patella", which marks the borders of the municipalities of Bergamo between the years 1392-1395 and which presents the form: COMMUNIS DE SUIXIO. In the majority of cases the geographical names are connected with the characteristics of the environment surrounded places and this is true also for Suisio which has an assonance with the river Seveso.

== Geological origin ==
Suisio was born ten millions years ago with the Earth and it has followed the same evolutions. The village lays on marine rocks of Canto Basso and Giglio mount. When the temperatures on the Earth started to go down deeply, the glaciers advanced on the planet and Suisio was completely covered by an ancient glacier which ended in Monza. The glaciers, during their very slow movement, carried here boulders of rocks and rubbles and they shaped the valleys and the level ground.

Melting glaciers and torrential rain made the level of rivers and streams raise and covered the Island of Bergamo with a wide swamp called Gerundo. Medolago and Calusco seem to signify: Medius-lacus and Caput-lacus. Consequently, also the land where Suisio lay down was inundated at that time. That long flood which left a thick layer of fertile land on the rocks made it so productive.

The rivers, with time passing, excavated their bed and, from Gerundo Lake, the lands of the Island of Bergamo surfaced. They are bordered by Canto Basso on the north, Brembo river on the east, Adda river on the west and on the south there is the confluence of these two rivers where Capriate S. Gervasio is located. And here, on this Island, called in this way maybe because of the two rivers surrounding it, lies Suisio.

== Coat of arms ==
The coat of arms is almost monochromatic. As declared in the Concession of DPR 14 July 1960, it represents two towers (of one in the other) of two floors crenellated supported by a light blue and silver strip.

On 18 April 1959, the mayor Giacomo Tasca decided to approve an emblem ex novo without waiting the necessary research in the historical archives of Bergamo and Venice. The opinion of the State Archive of Venice, written in a letter in 1960, was positive. However, the director expressed some critics about the aspect of the coat of arms of Suisio, considering it quite dark. From the heraldic point of view deserves a particularly attention the expression of one to another – wrongly used as of one in the other which has another mean – referred to a picture placed on a partition of fields of different shellac taking the color of the nearby field.

== Ethnicity and foreign minorities ==
The foreigners residing in Suisio is about 13% of the whole population.

== Demographic notes ==
The resident population is composed by 3794 inhabitants:

- Men 1918
- Women 1876

== Demographic evolution ==
Historical population

| Year | Pop. | ±% |
|---|---|---|
| 1861 | 1,132 | — |
| 1871 | 1,187 | +4.9% |
| 1881 | 1,168 | −1.6% |
| 1901 | 1,237 | +5.9% |
| 1911 | 1,384 | +11.9% |

| Year | Pop. | ±% |
|---|---|---|
| 1921 | 1,457 | +5.3% |
| 1931 | 1,620 | +11.2% |
| 1936 | 1,555 | −4.0% |
| 1951 | 1,895 | +21.9% |
| 1961 | 1,927 | +1.7% |

| Year | Pop. | ±% |
|---|---|---|
| 1971 | 2,239 | +16.2% |
| 1981 | 2,808 | +25.4% |
| 1991 | 3,060 | +9.0% |
| 2001 | 3,308 | +8.1% |

Source: Data from ISTAT

== Monuments and places of interests ==
- Sant'Andrea church: built in the 18th century, it is the building that better characterizes the territory, considered among the best architectural examples of that period at provincial level. It has sleek lines and the structure presents a Latin cross plan, containing some works among which the paints depicted by Francesco Capella, Francesco Zucco, Federico Ferrari and Giovanbattista Riva, statues made by Luigi Carrara and a crucifix by Gaetano Peverada. The tradition wants that this church was built at the behest of the local family heads to redeem the disputes between inhabitants of different fractions that were assuming the right to call "parochial" their church.
- San Floriano chapel: in the old town of the Castelletto fraction, dating back to 600, it is a stone building of little size.
- Church of the Annunciation of Maria Vergine: located in Piazza Amati fraction. Inside there are high-value paintings.
- San Lorenzo church: it is the major church of Castelletto, it was used in the first century of life as parochial of the entire municipality, built between the 16th and the 17th century. Inside are preserved paintings by Cignaroli and Carlo Ceresa.
