= AC Ponte San Pietro SSD =

Italian football club

Ponte San Pietro
- Full name: Associazione Calcio Ponte San Pietro; Società Sportiva Dilettantistica a r.l.
- Founded: 1910; 2007 (refounded)
- Ground: Stadio Matteo Legler, Ponte San Pietro, Italy
- Capacity: 2,000
- Chairman: Marziale Bonasio
- Manager: Nicola Valenti
- League: Eccellenza
- 2022–23: Serie D/B, 7th
Home colours	Away colours

Associazione Calcio Ponte San Pietro Società Sportiva Dilettantistica (usually referred to as Ponte San Pietro) is an Italian association football club located in Ponte San Pietro and also representing the towns of Terno d'Isola and Chignolo d'Isola, Lombardy. The club currently plays in Eccellenza.

== History ==
Pontisola was founded in 1910 in Ponte San Pietro as Società Sportiva Vita Nota and changed its denomination to Unione Sportiva Ponte San Pietro in 1950. The side spent the 1947–48 season in Serie B.

In 2007 the club, after the merger with F.C. Isola (representing the nearby towns of Terno d'Isola and Chignolo d'Isola), was renamed Unione Sportiva Ponte San Pietro Isola and later to the current one.

== Colours and badge ==
Its colours are blue and white.

== Honours ==
- Regional Coppa Italia Lombardy:
  - Winner (1): 2006–07

== Notable people ==
- Riccardo Cerini (born 2000), professional football defender
