= Chignolo =

Chignolo may refer to the following municipalities in Lombardy, Italy:

- Chignolo d'Isola, Province of Bergamo
- Chignolo Po, Province of Pavia
