= Filago =

- Comune
- Comune di Filago
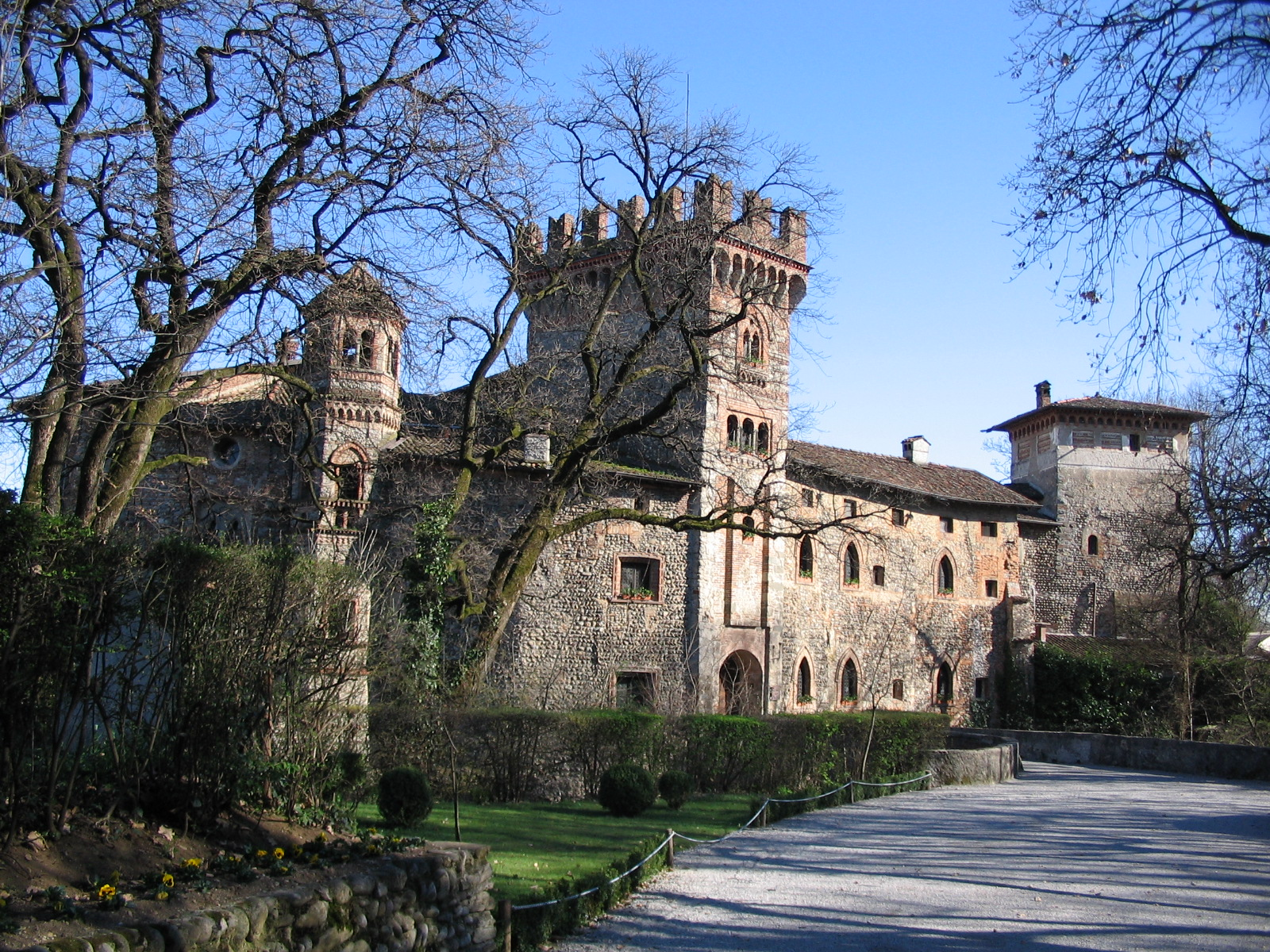
- Castle in the frazione of Marne

- Location within Italy Location within Lombardy
- Coordinates: 45°38′N 9°33′E
- Country: Italy
- Region: Lombardy
- Province: Bergamo (BG)

Government
  - Mayor: Daniele Medici

Area
  - Total: 5.3 km^{2} (2.0 sq mi)
- Elevation: 190 m (620 ft)

Population (31 July 2017)
  - Total: 3,215
  - Density: 610/km^{2} (1,600/sq mi)
- Demonym: Filaghesi
- Time zone: UTC+1 (CET)
  - Summer (DST): UTC+2 (CEST)
- Postal code: 24040
- Dialing code: 035
- Website: Official website

Filago (Bergamasque: Filàgh) is a comune (municipality) in the Province of Bergamo in the Italian region of Lombardy, located about 35 kilometres (22 mi) northeast of Milan and about 12 kilometres (7 mi) southwest of Bergamo.

Filago borders the following municipalities: Bonate Sotto, Bottanuco, Brembate, Capriate San Gervasio, Dalmine, Madone, Osio Sopra, Osio Sotto.

== People ==
- Maurizio Malvestiti, (1953), bishop of Lodi.
