= Carlo Esterle Hydroelectric Power Station =

Power station in Cornate d'Adda, Italy

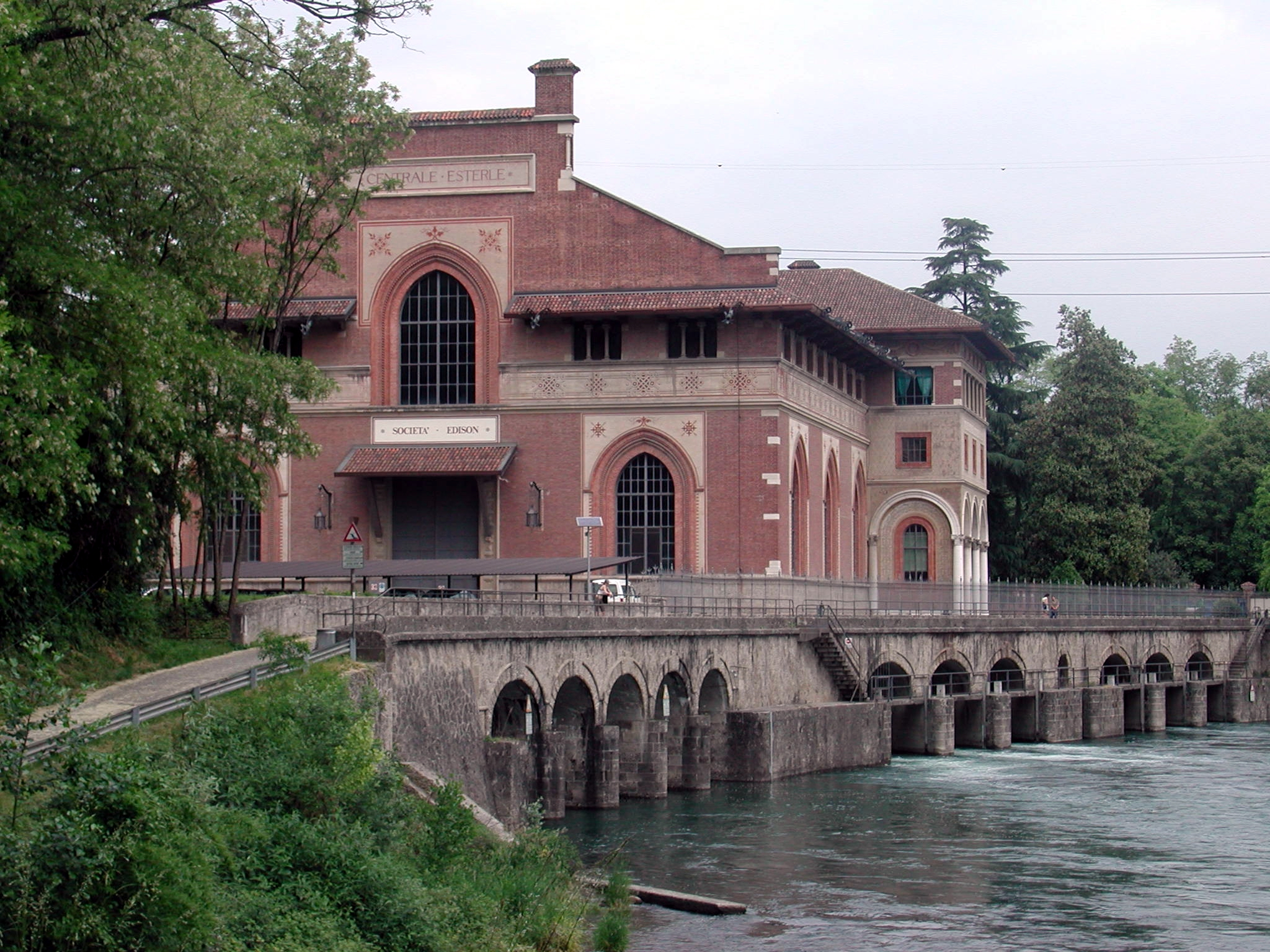
- Carlo Esterle Hydroelectric Power Station in 2006

- Location within Italy
- Country: Italy
- Location: Cornate d'Adda, Lombardy
- Coordinates: 45.6533069°N 9.4838642°E
- Purpose: Power
- Status: Operational
- Opening date: 1914

Carlo Esterle Hydroelectric Power Station (Italian: Centrale idroelettrica Carlo Esterle) is a hydroelectric power plant located in Cornate d'Adda, in the Lombardy region of northern Italy.

The plant is owned and operated by the Italian electric utility company Edison.

== History ==
the power station was built by the Edison company to meet the growing demand for electricity in the early twentieth century, replacing an earlier farmhouse known as Cascina Resega that previously occupied the site. Construction began in 1910 under the direction of engineer Alberto Mussato, with the facility being brought into service in 1914. It was dedicated to Carlo Esterle, managing director of Edison from 1897 to 1918.

== Description ==
The Esterle station is located on the right bank of the Adda River. It is supplied with water drawn from approximately 4.8 km (3.0 mi) upstream, where a dam at Robbiate diverts the river flow into the Canale Edison. After an initial navigable section equipped with a boat lock that allows river traffic to bypass the dam, the water continues along a non-navigable supply channel, much of it running through tunnels. It then reaches a concrete forebay carved into the hillside above the plant. From there, the water is conveyed to the powerhouse through a series of steel penstocks descending to the turbine hall on the riverbank below, which houses six Francis-type turbines.

The station's machine hall features an Eclectic architecture.
