= Carlo Ceresa =

Italian painter (1609-1679)

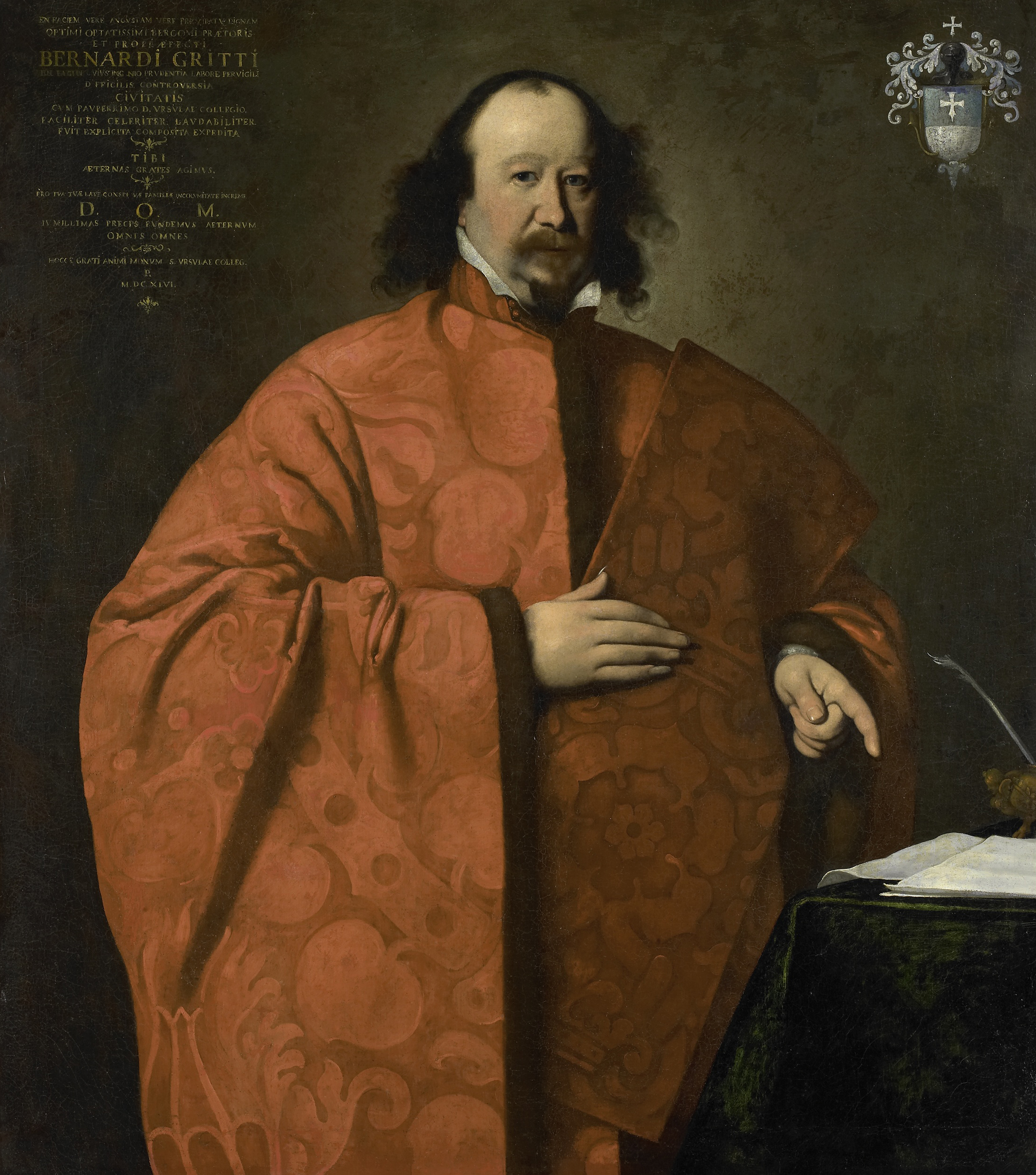
- Portrait of Bernardo Gritti, oil on canvas, Rijksmuseum, Amsterdam
- Born: January 20, 1609; San Giovanni Bianco, Bergamo, Republic of Venice
- Died: 29 January 1679 (aged 70); Bergamo, Republic of Venice
- Education: Daniele Crespi
- Known for: Painting
- Movement: Baroque

Carlo Ceresa (January 20, 1609 – January 29, 1679) was an Italian painter of the Baroque period active mainly around Bergamo. He was mainly known for his portrait paintings of local nobility and clergy which he executed in an austere, realist style. He also produced many Christian-themed history paintings which can be found in churches in the Bergamo region.

== Biography ==
Ceresa was born in 1609 at San Giovanni Bianco, a town in the Brembana Valley in the province of Bergamo. His parents Ambrogio and Caterina were well-to-do people who had moved there from Valsassina. He was a pupil and then assistant of the Milanese painter Daniele Crespi, whose style and vocabulary lived on in his work after the master’s death in 1630. He married Caterina Zignoni from a prominent family. Through her he was able to access to other prominent families in Bergamo whose primary portraitist he would become.

He was active in the area of Bergamo and produced a large number of religious works characterised by a sober, understated approach combined with the vivid color of the Venetian school for the many churches and sanctuaries there. He was also a skillful portrait painter whose services were sought after by the noble families of the city. The naturalism pervading the depiction of his subjects recalls the work of Moroni and looks forward to Fra Galgario and Ceruti (Pitochetto). He died in Bergamo in 1679.

== Career ==
Ceresa's early works are heavily influenced by the late-Mannerist style of such local painters as Enea Salmeggia, Francesco Zucchi and Giovan Battista Cavagna. The altarpiece of the Virgin in Glory with Saints (1636; Isola di Fondra, San Lorenzo) moves away from Mannerism towards a more naturalistic tradition, represented in Bergamo by Moroni. Similarly the many portraits that Ceresa made for the Vertova family in 1633 (e.g. Bernardo Vertova, Bergamo, priv. col.) aim to achieve a naturalistic description of dress and a powerful sense of the sitter’s character. Again the influence of Moroni, who painted sober portraits, is evident, though the portrait of Giovan Battista Bonemetti (1633; Bergamo, Casa di Riposo) also suggests that of Bernardo Strozzi.

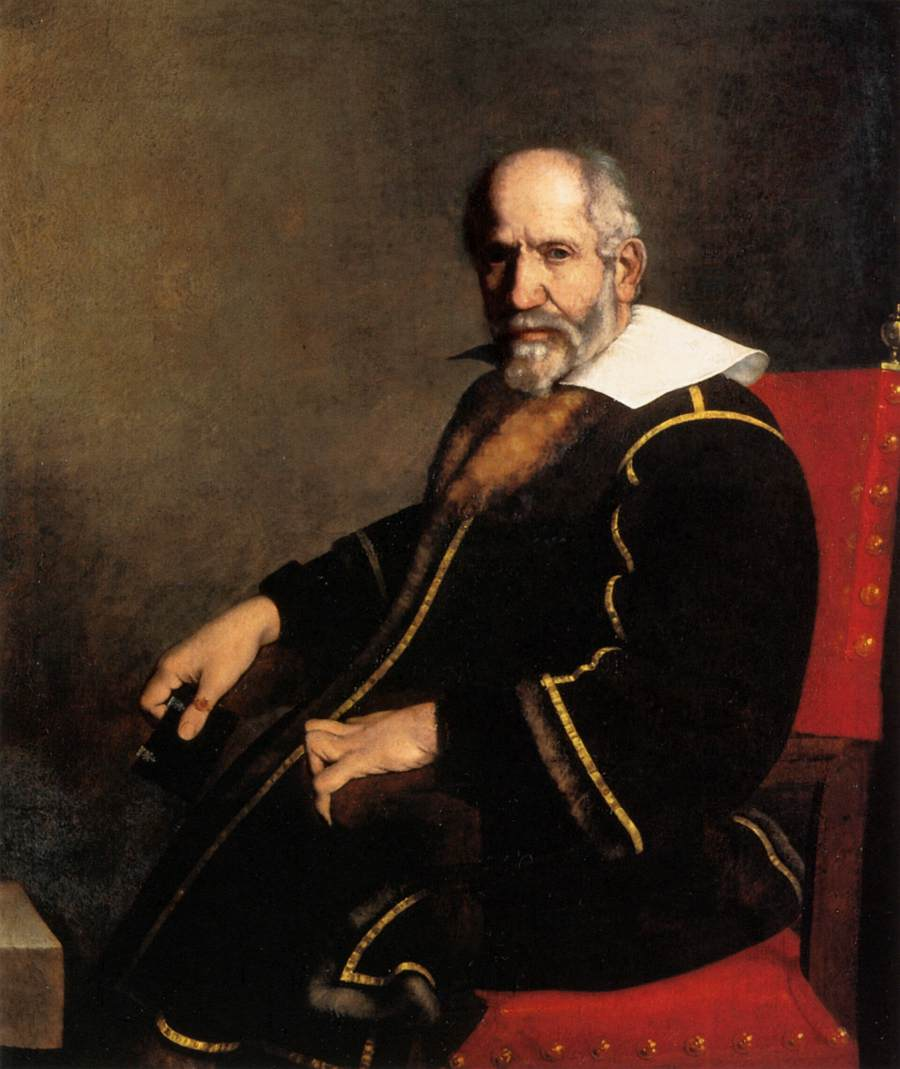
Portrait of an Old Gentleman, c. 1638–9, Fondazione Roberto Longhi, Florence

Elsewhere, in portraits of the mid-1630s, the influence of Tiberio Tinelli and of Nicolas Régnier can be seen. Ceresa’s portraits of Laura Zignoni Boselli (1640; Bergamo, Rattini priv. col.) and Jacopo Tiraboschi (c. 1645; Bergamo, Accademia Carrara) develop this direct and powerful naturalism. In such religious paintings as the Baptism (1641; Terno d'Isola, Parish Church) and the Pietà (c. 1650; Fino del Monte, Sant'Andrea) figure types derived from Crespi are transferred to a more domestic setting of simple, sincere devotion. This warmly human, everyday rendering of sacred events is best exemplified in the altarpieces of the 1640s, in the Crucifixion with Disciples (1641; Mapello, San Michele), which recalls the severity of Francisco de Zurbarán, in the St. Roch (1643; San Pietro d’Orzio, San Rocco) and in the luminous Vision of St. Felix (1644; Nese, San Giorgio). In these works the complex orchestration of individual figures, the gestures within the scenes as a whole and the delicate modulation of colour through intermediate tones show that Ceresa was open to fresh influences.

In the small paintings that frame his many versions of the Virgin of the Rosary (e.g. 1645; Santuario di Sombreno, Cappella del Rosario) and the larger Mysteries of the Rosary (c. 1650–55; Vercurago, Santuario dei Revrendi Padri Somaschi) Ceresa showed his gifts as a narrator. He was also an accomplished fresco painter, as demonstrated in the Coronation of the Virgin (c. 1644), which he painted in collaboration with Giovanni Battista Calandra on the cupola of the church of the Nativity of Mary, Dalmine, and in the scenes of the Crucifixion and the Annunciation (both 1650s) in San Vittore at Terno d’Isola.

From the end of the 1650s Ceresa’s work tended to be repetitive, and it is likely that he ran a workshop, to which his sons Antonio and Giuseppe contributed. Carlo's portraits, however, remained of a high standard, as can be seen in the full-length Gentleman with a Hat under his Arm (c. 1665–70) and Gentleman with a Full Wig (1665–70; both Bergamo, priv. col.), which are distinguished by their bare settings, the figures being isolated against a background of dull greys. His work as a fresco painter continued in this late period, an example being the two angels (before 1667) he painted in the Santuario della Beata Vergine dei Campi in Stezzano.

== Gallery ==
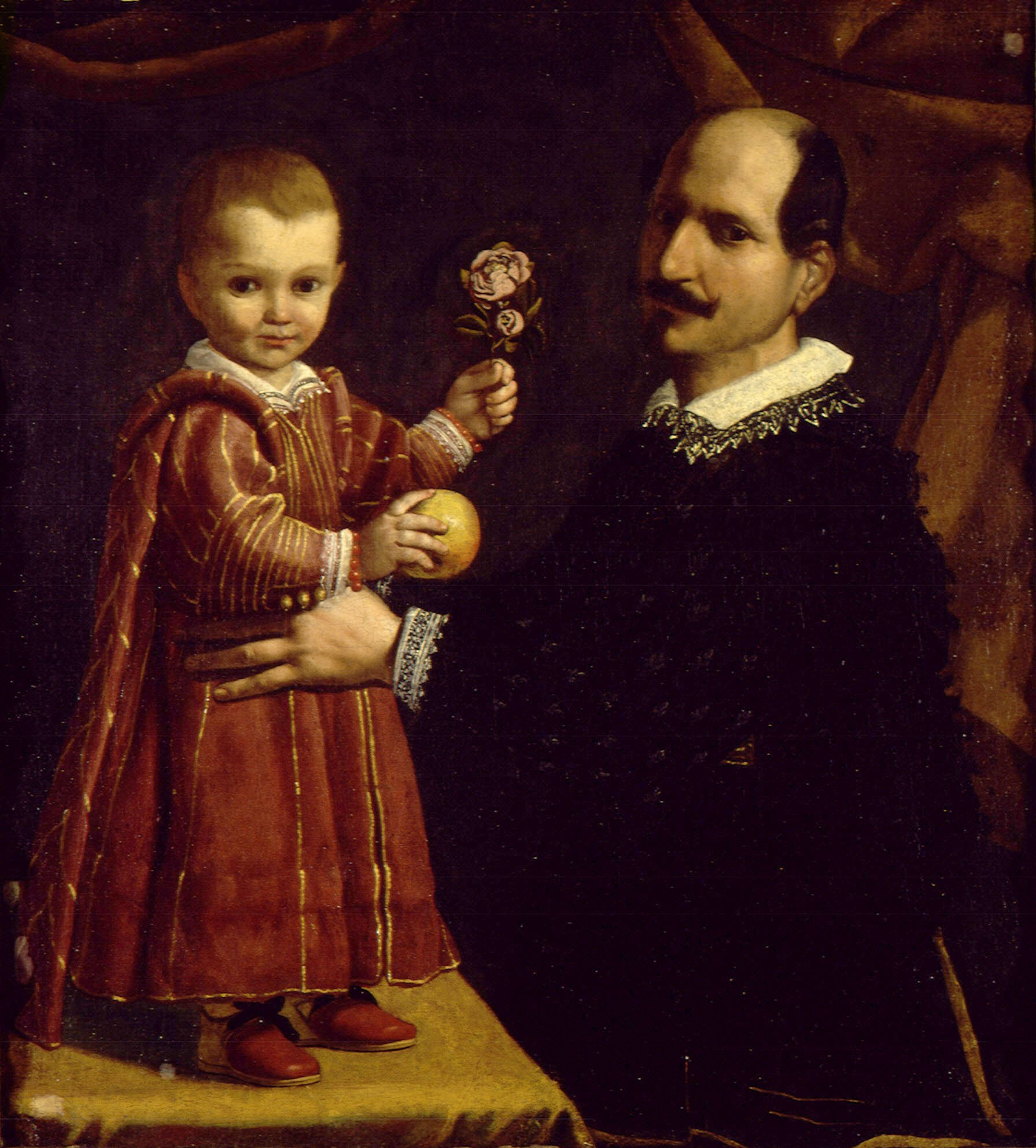
A Man with a Child, Auckland Art Gallery

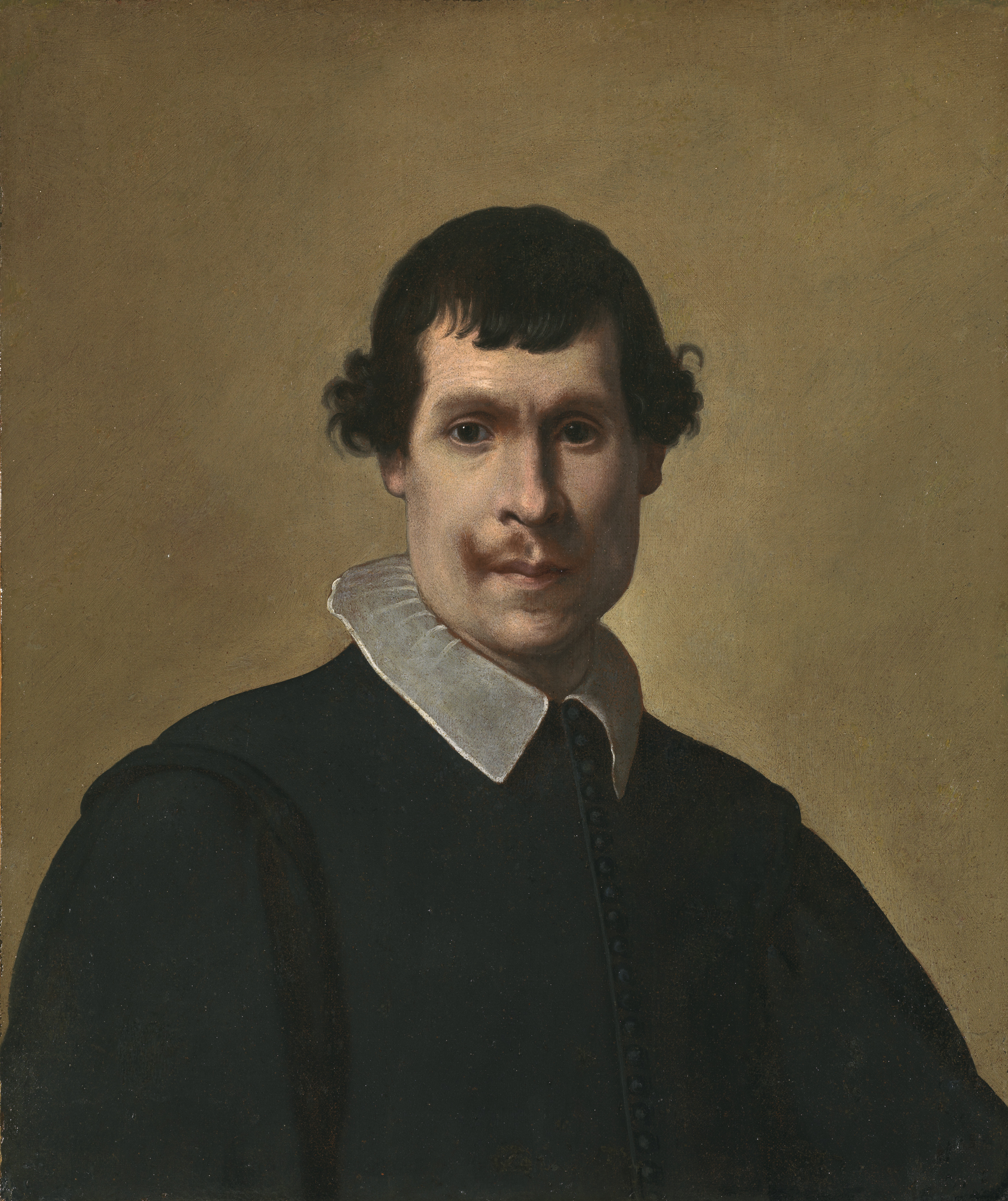
Portrait of a Knight, Museo del Prado, Madrid

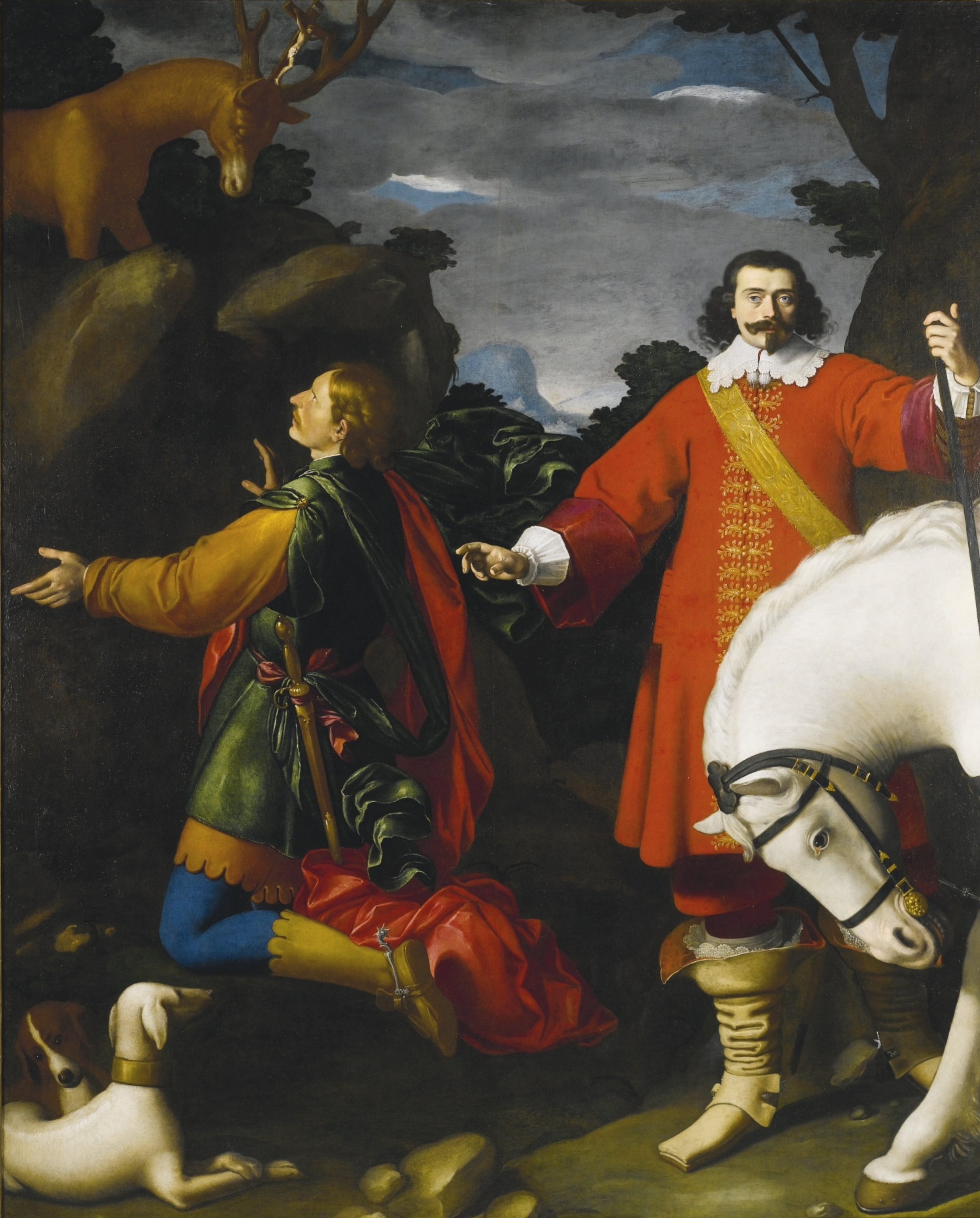
The vision of Saint Eustace, priv. col.

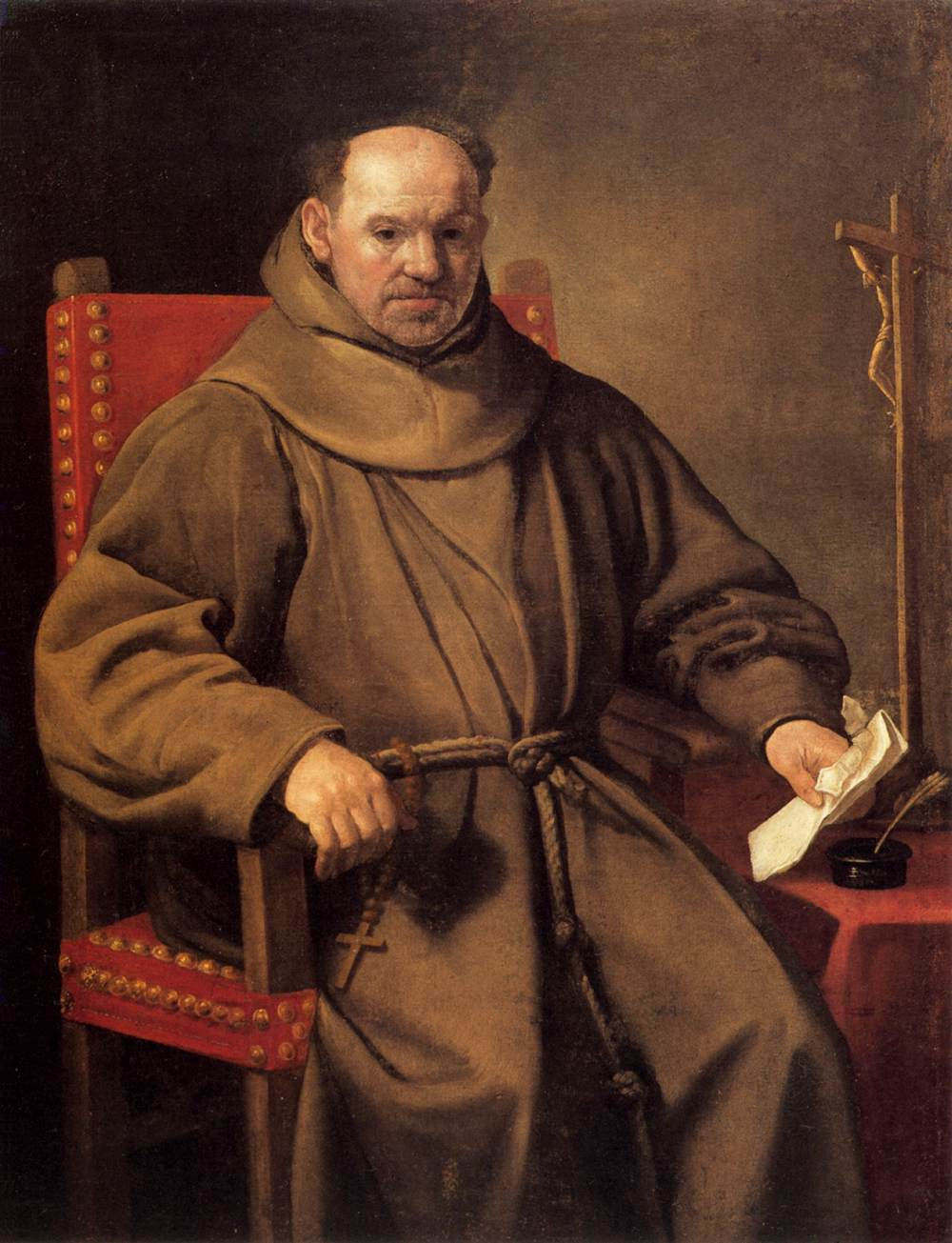
Portrait of a Friar, Accademia Carrara, Bergamo

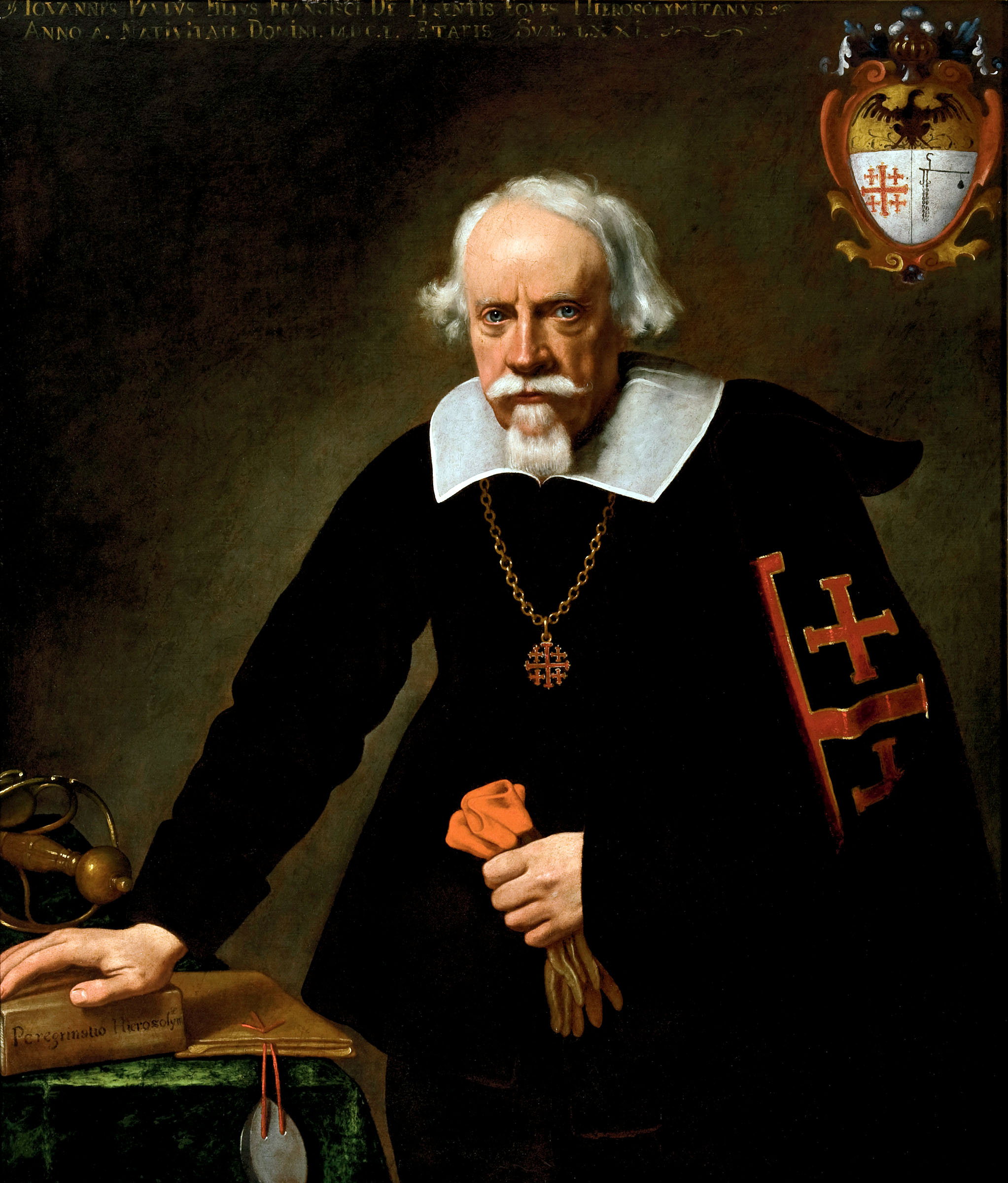
Portrait of Giovanni Paolo Pesenti, priv. col.

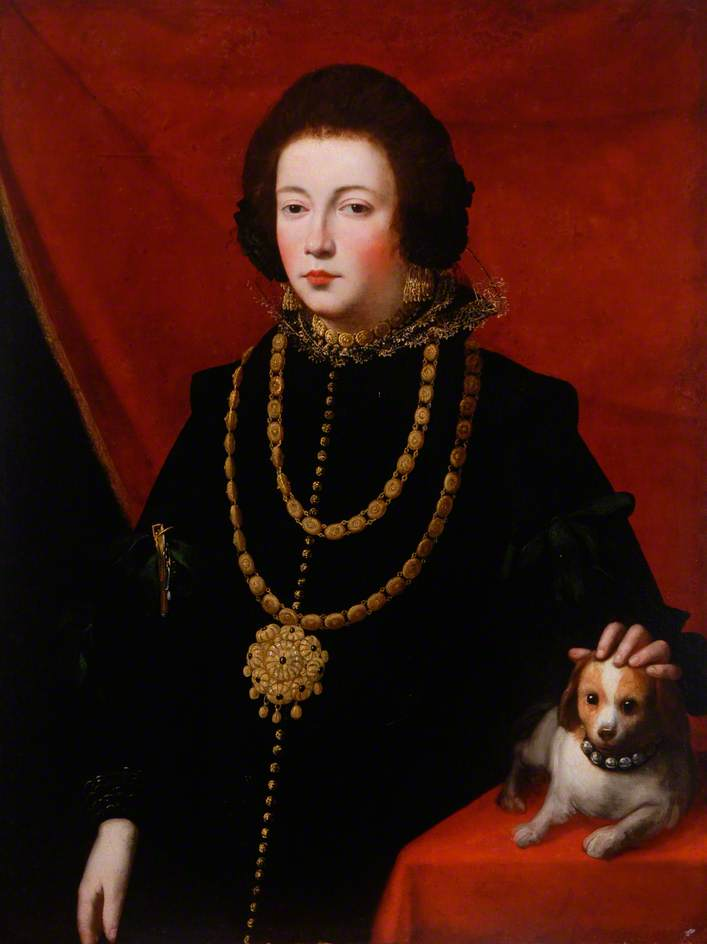
Portrait of a Lady with a Small Dog, Middlesbrough Institute of Modern Art, Middlesbrough

== Bibliography ==
- Testori, Giovanni (1953). "Carlo Ceresa ritrattista". Paragone. 4 (39): 19–28.
- Ruggeri, Ugo (1979). Carlo Ceresa: Dipinti e disegni. Bergamo: Monumenta Bergomensia.
- Gregori, Mina (1979). "CERESA, Carlo". Dizionario Biografico degli Italiani (in Italian). Vol. 23: Cavallucci–Cerretesi. Rome: Istituto dell'Enciclopedia Italiana. ISBN 978-88-12-00032-6.
- Mangili, Renzo (1983). "Ceresa inedito". Arte Lombarda. 58–9: 56–63.
