= Levate =

Italian comune

- Comune
- Comune di Levate
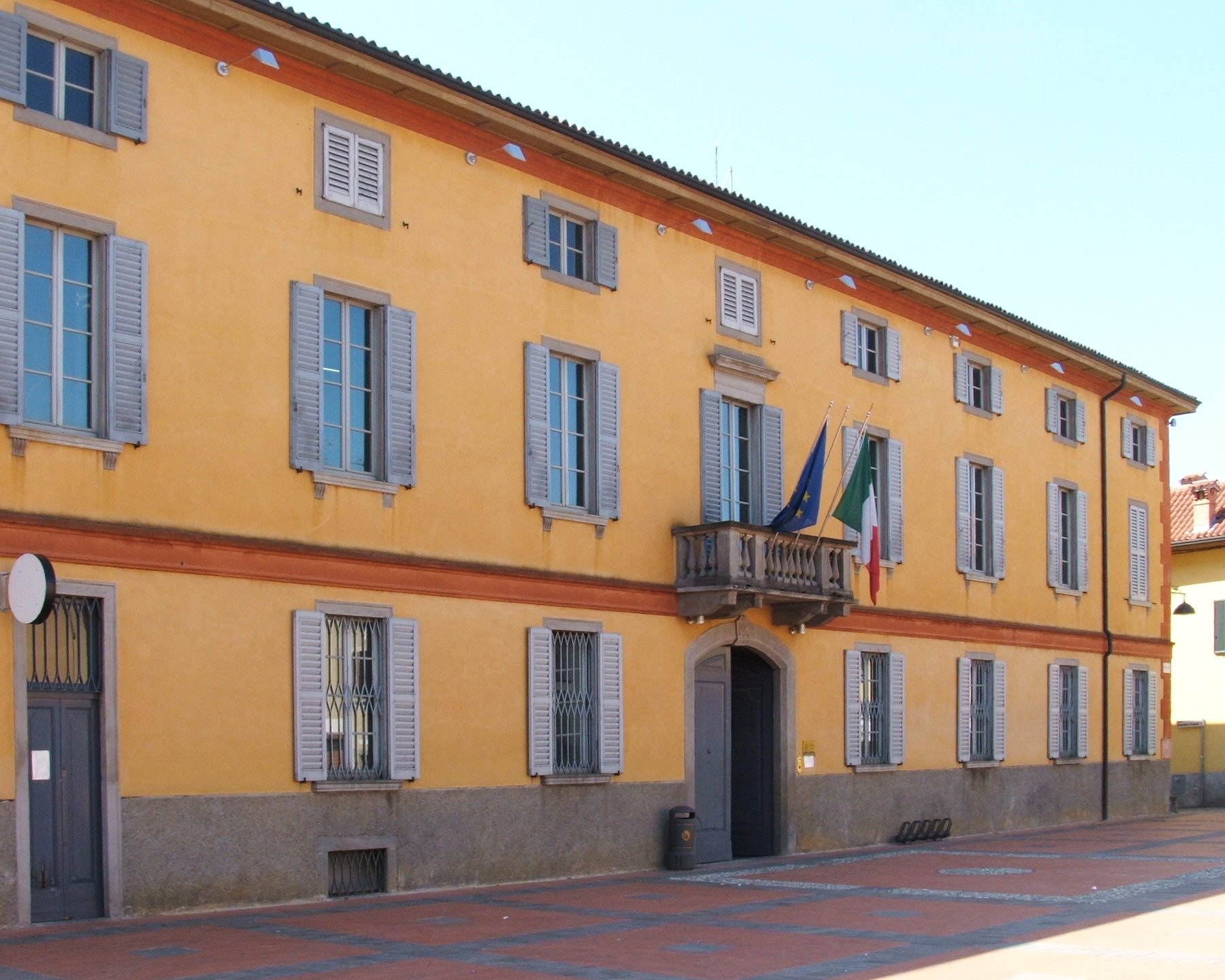
- Town hall

- Location within Italy Location within Lombardy
- Coordinates: 45°38′N 9°37′E
- Country: Italy
- Region: Lombardy
- Province: Bergamo (BG)

Government
  - Mayor: Paola Agazzi

Area
  - Total: 5.53 km^{2} (2.14 sq mi)
- Elevation: 185 m (607 ft)

Population (30 April 2017)
  - Total: 3,895
  - Density: 704/km^{2} (1,820/sq mi)
- Demonym: Levatesi
- Time zone: UTC+1 (CET)
  - Summer (DST): UTC+2 (CEST)
- Postal code: 24040
- Dialing code: 035
- Website: Official website

Levate (Bergamasque: Leàt) is a comune (municipality) in the Province of Bergamo in the Italian region of Lombardy, located about 40 kilometres (25 mi) northeast of Milan and about 8 kilometres (5 mi) southwest of Bergamo.

Levate borders the following municipalities: Comun Nuovo, Dalmine, Osio Sopra, Osio Sotto, Stezzano, Verdellino, Verdello.
