= Bottanuco =

- Comune
- Comune di Bottanuco
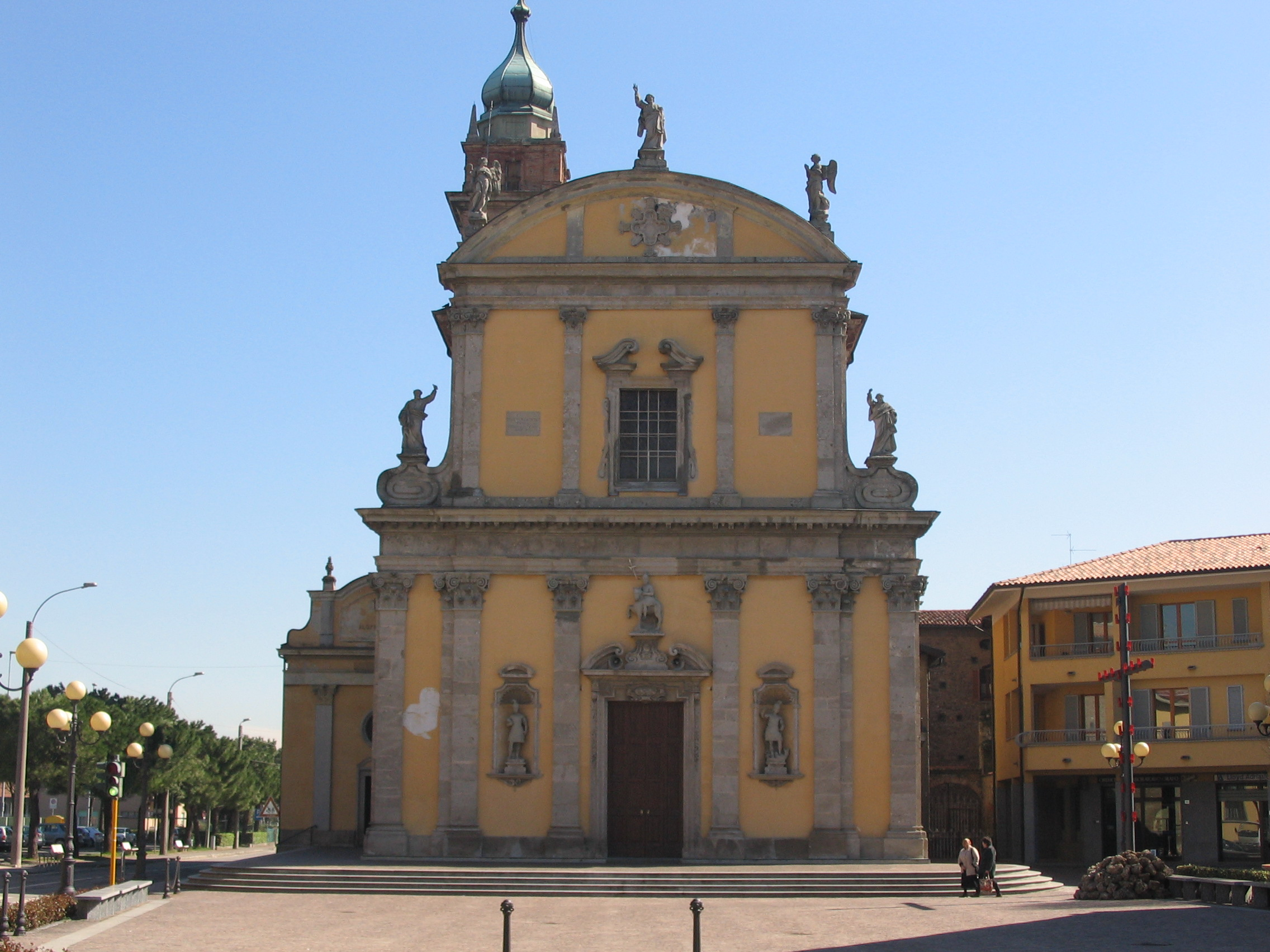
- Church in Bottanuco

- Coat of arms

- Location within Italy Location within Lombardy
- Coordinates: 45°38′N 9°31′E
- Country: Italy
- Region: Lombardy
- Province: Province of Bergamo (BG)
- Frazioni: Cerro

Area
  - Total: 5.7 km^{2} (2.2 sq mi)
- Elevation: 222 m (728 ft)

Population (Dec. 2004)
  - Total: 4,874
  - Density: 860/km^{2} (2,200/sq mi)
- Demonym: Bottanuchesi
- Time zone: UTC+1 (CET)
  - Summer (DST): UTC+2 (CEST)
- Postal code: 24040
- Dialing code: 035

Bottanuco (Bergamasque: Botanüch) is a comune (municipality) in the Province of Bergamo in the Italian region of Lombardy, located about 35 kilometres (22 mi) northeast of Milan and about 14 kilometres (9 mi) southwest of Bergamo. As of 31 December 2004, it had a population of 4,874 and an area of 5.7 square kilometres (2.2 mi^{2}).

The municipality of Bottanuco contains the frazione (subdivision) Cerro.

Bottanuco borders the following municipalities: Capriate San Gervasio, Chignolo d'Isola, Cornate d'Adda, Filago, Madone, Suisio, Trezzo sull'Adda.

== Demographic evolution ==
Historical population

Year	Pop.	±%
1861	1,413	—
1871	1,470	+4.0%
1881	1,535	+4.4%
1901	1,792	+16.7%
1911	1,937	+8.1%

Year	Pop.	±%
1921	2,072	+7.0%
1931	2,274	+9.7%
1936	2,231	−1.9%
1951	2,407	+7.9%
1961	2,566	+6.6%

Year	Pop.	±%
1971	3,049	+18.8%
1981	3,565	+16.9%
1991	4,004	+12.3%
2001	4,567	+14.1%

Source: Data from ISTAT
