= Medolago =

- Comune
- Comune di Medolago
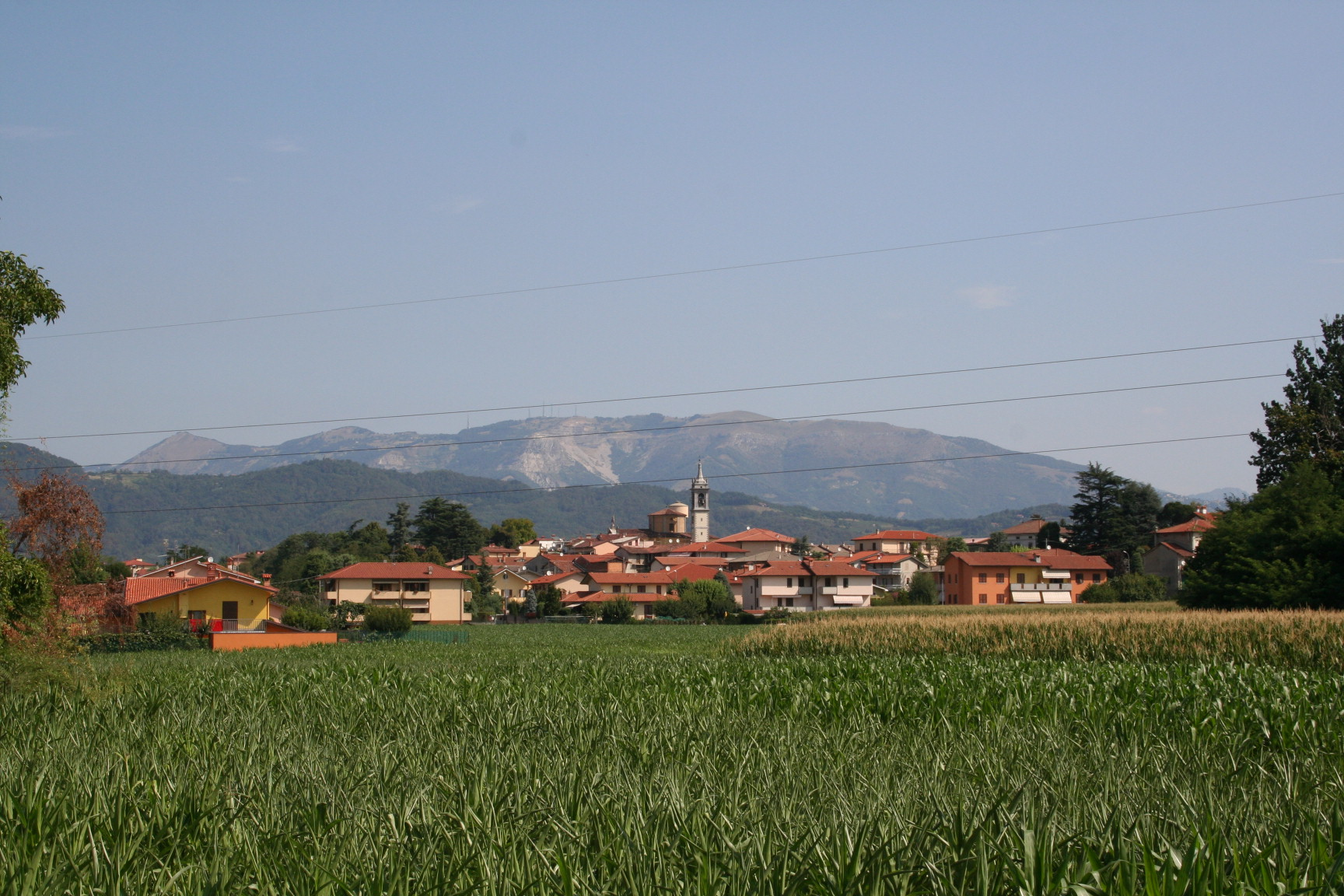
- Medolago

- Coat of arms

- Location within Italy Location within Lombardy
- Coordinates: 45°40′N 9°30′E
- Country: Italy
- Region: Lombardy
- Province: Province of Bergamo (BG)

Area
  - Total: 3.8 km^{2} (1.5 sq mi)
- Elevation: 246 m (807 ft)

Population (Dec. 2004)
  - Total: 2,231
  - Density: 590/km^{2} (1,500/sq mi)
- Demonym: Medolaghesi
- Time zone: UTC+1 (CET)
  - Summer (DST): UTC+2 (CEST)
- Postal code: 24030
- Dialing code: 035

Medolago (Bergamasque: Medulàch) is a comune (municipality) in the Province of Bergamo in the Italian region of Lombardy, located about 35 kilometres (22 mi) northeast of Milan and about 14 kilometres (9 mi) southwest of Bergamo. As of 31 December 2004, it had a population of 2,231 and an area of 3.8 square kilometres (1.5 mi^{2}).

Medolago borders the following municipalities: Calusco d'Adda, Chignolo d'Isola, Cornate d'Adda, Paderno d'Adda, Solza, Suisio, Terno d'Isola.

== Demographic evolution ==
Historical population

Year	Pop.	±%
1861	763	—
1871	815	+6.8%
1881	802	−1.6%
1901	777	−3.1%
1911	896	+15.3%

Year	Pop.	±%
1921	978	+9.2%
1931	1,016	+3.9%
1936	980	−3.5%
1951	1,052	+7.3%
1961	1,048	−0.4%

Year	Pop.	±%
1971	1,065	+1.6%
1981	1,246	+17.0%
1991	1,606	+28.9%
2001	2,047	+27.5%

Source: Data from ISTAT
