= Osio Sotto =

- Comune
- Comune di Osio Sotto
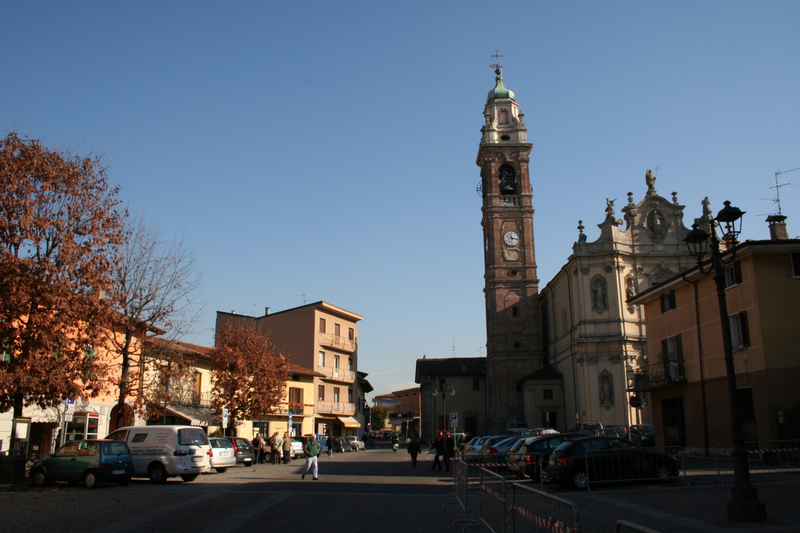
- Pope John XXIII Square

- Flag Coat of arms

- Location of Osio Sotto in Italy Osio Sotto (Lombardy)
- Coordinates: 45°37′N 9°36′E
- Country: Italy
- Region: Lombardy
- Province: Province of Bergamo (BG)
- Frazioni: Zingonia

Government
  - Mayor: Corrado Quarti (Lista civica)

Area
  - Total: 7.5 km^{2} (2.9 sq mi)
- Elevation: 182 m (597 ft)

Population (Dec. 2019)
  - Total: 12,600
  - Density: 1,700/km^{2} (4,400/sq mi)
- Demonym: Osiensi
- Time zone: UTC+1 (CET)
  - Summer (DST): UTC+2 (CEST)
- Postal code: 24046
- Dialing code: 035
- Patron saint: San Zenone, San Donato
- Saint day: 7 August
- Website: http://www.comune.osiosotto.bg.it/

Osio Sotto (Bergamasque: Öss de Sóta) is a comune (municipality) in the Province of Bergamo in the Italian region of Lombardy, located about 40 kilometres (25 mi) northeast of Milan and about 11 kilometres (7 mi) southwest of Bergamo. As of 31 December 2004, it had a population of 11,097 and an area of 7.5 square kilometres (2.9 mi^{2}).

Founded in Roman times, the comune is currently the tenth municipality in the province of Bergamo by population, and the fourth of the southern Bergamo region.

Osio Sotto borders the following municipalities: Boltiere, Brembate, Filago, Levate, Osio Sopra, Verdellino.

== Population history ==
Historical population

Year	Pop.	±%
1861	1,749	—
1871	1,883	+7.7%
1881	2,026	+7.6%
1901	2,166	+6.9%
1911	2,273	+4.9%

Year	Pop.	±%
1921	2,464	+8.4%
1931	3,156	+28.1%
1936	3,398	+7.7%
1951	4,389	+29.2%
1961	5,163	+17.6%

Year	Pop.	±%
1971	6,487	+25.6%
1981	9,449	+45.7%
1991	9,982	+5.6%
2001	10,630	+6.5%

Source: Data from ISTAT
