= Verdello–Dalmine railway station =

Railway station in Italy

Verdello–Dalmine
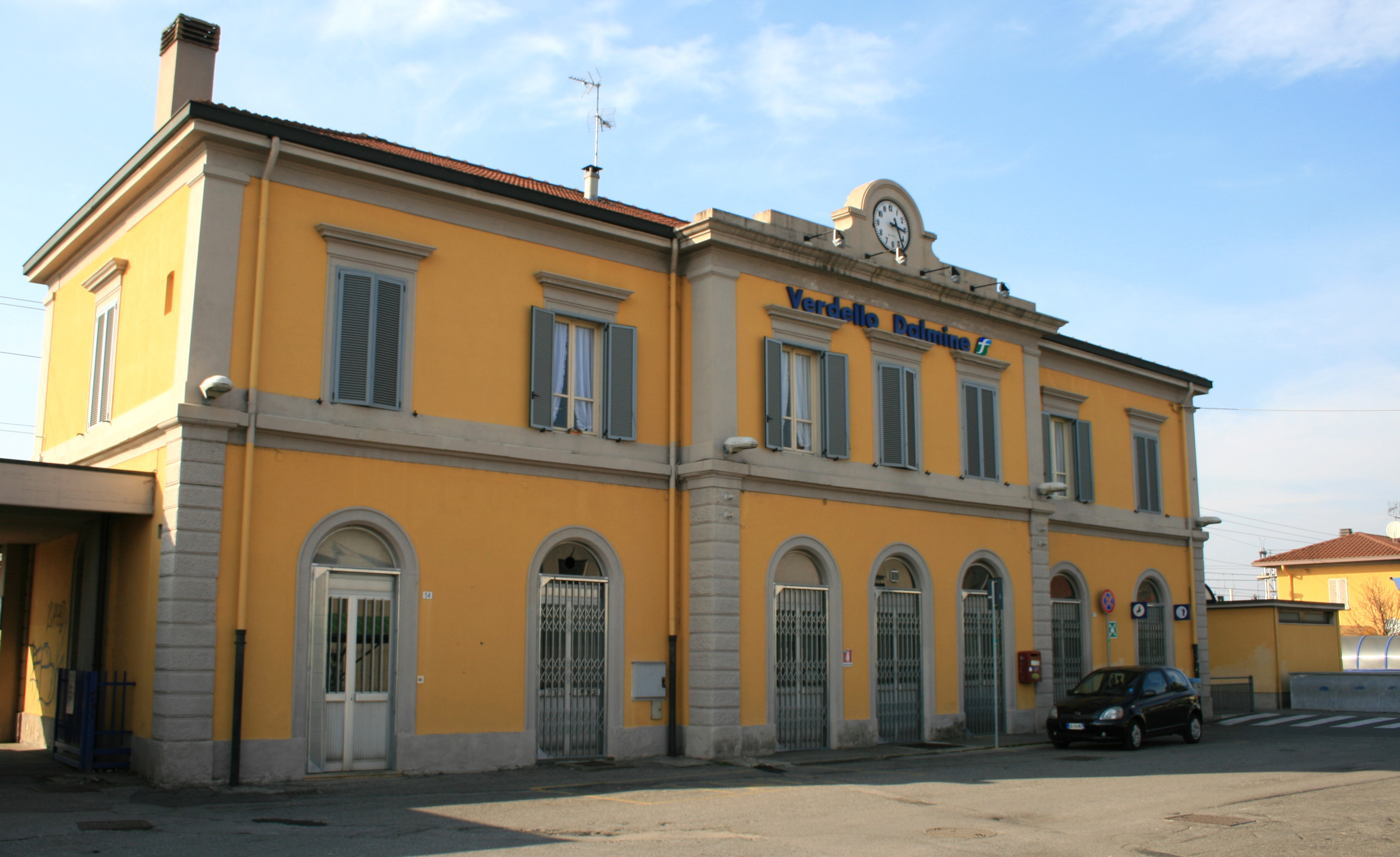
- Verdello-Dalmine railway station

General information
- Location: Viale Marconi 1, Verdellino, Lombardy; Italy
- Coordinates: 45°36′20″N 09°37′11″E
- Owner: Rete Ferroviaria Italiana
- Operator: Trenord
- Line: Treviglio–Bergamo railway
- Platforms: 3
- Tracks: 4

Other information
- Classification: Silver

History
- Opened: 1857; 169 years ago
Location
- Location within Lombardy Location within Northern Italy Location within Italy

Verdello–Dalmine (Italian: Stazione di Verdello–Dalmine) is a railway station serving the towns of Verdello and Dalmine, in the region of Lombardy, northern Italy. The station opened in 1857 and is located on the Treviglio–Bergamo railway. The train services are operated by Trenord.

== History ==
The station was originally known as Verdello and the name was changed to Verdello–Dalmine in 1947.

== Train services ==
The station is served by the following service(s):

- Express services (Treno regionale) Milan – Pioltello – Verdello – Bergamo
- Regional services (Treno regionale) Bergamo – Verdello – Treviglio

== See also ==
- History of rail transport in Italy
- List of railway stations in Lombardy
- Rail transport in Italy
- Railway stations in Italy
