= Carvico =

- Comune
- Comune di Carvico
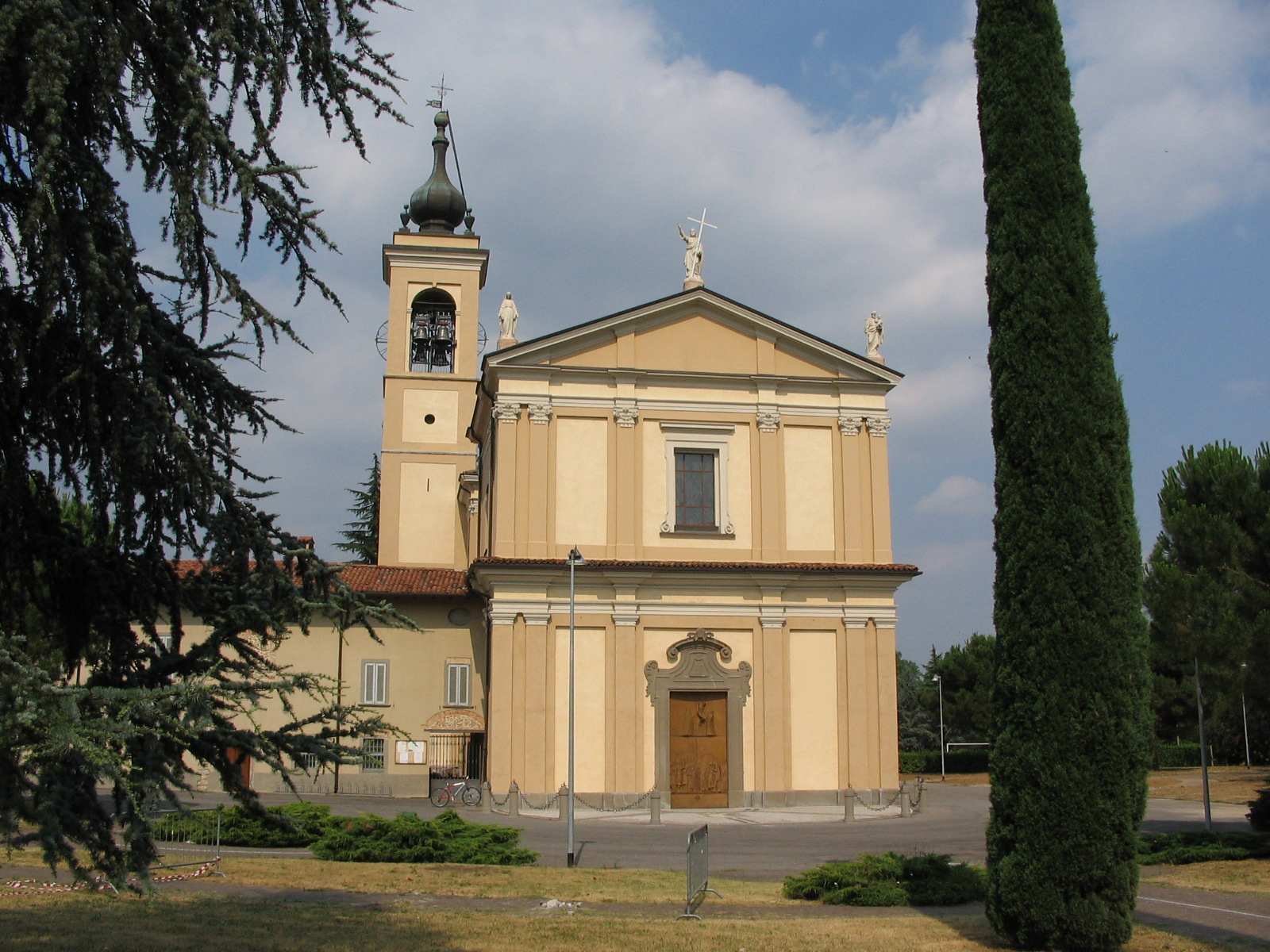
- Church

- Location within Italy Location within Lombardy
- Coordinates: 45°42′N 9°29′E
- Country: Italy
- Region: Lombardy
- Province: Province of Bergamo (BG)

Area
  - Total: 4.4 km^{2} (1.7 sq mi)
- Elevation: 287 m (942 ft)

Population (Dec. 2004)
  - Total: 4,355
  - Density: 990/km^{2} (2,600/sq mi)
- Demonym: Carvichesi
- Time zone: UTC+1 (CET)
  - Summer (DST): UTC+2 (CEST)
- Postal code: 24030
- Dialing code: 035
- Website: Official website

Carvico (Bergamasque: Carvìch) is a comune (municipality) in the Province of Bergamo in the Italian region of Lombardy, located about 35 kilometres (22 miles) northeast of Milan and about 14 km (9 mi) west of Bergamo. As of 31 December 2004, it had a population of 4,355 and an area of 4.4 square kilometres (1.7 sq mi).

Carvico borders the following municipalities: Calusco d'Adda, Pontida, Sotto il Monte Giovanni XXIII, Terno d'Isola, Villa d'Adda.

== Demographic evolution ==
Historical population

Year	Pop.	±%
1861	941	—
1871	992	+5.4%
1881	1,031	+3.9%
1901	1,162	+12.7%
1911	1,359	+17.0%

Year	Pop.	±%
1921	1,470	+8.2%
1931	1,801	+22.5%
1936	1,882	+4.5%
1951	2,126	+13.0%
1961	2,837	+33.4%

Year	Pop.	±%
1971	3,268	+15.2%
1981	3,578	+9.5%
1991	3,923	+9.6%
2001	4,141	+5.6%

Source: Data from ISTAT

== International relations ==
=== Twin towns — Sister cities ===
Carvico is twinned with:

- Carvin (France)
