= Dalmine =

- Comune
- Città di Dalmine
- Coat of arms

- Location within Italy Location within Lombardy
- Coordinates: 45°39′N 9°36′E
- Country: Italy
- Region: Lombardy
- Province: Province of Bergamo (BG)
- Frazioni: Sforzatica S. Maria d'Oleno, Sforzatica S. Andrea, Mariano al Brembo, Brembo, Guzzanica, Sabbio

Area
  - Total: 11.6 km^{2} (4.5 sq mi)
- Elevation: 201 m (659 ft)

Population (Dec. 2004)
  - Total: 22,326
  - Density: 1,920/km^{2} (4,980/sq mi)
- Demonym: Dalminesi
- Time zone: UTC+1 (CET)
  - Summer (DST): UTC+2 (CEST)
- Postal code: 24044
- Dialing code: 035
- Website: Official website

Dalmine (Bergamasque: Dàlmen) is a comune (municipality) in the Province of Bergamo in the Italian region of Lombardy, located about 40 kilometres (25 mi) northeast of Milan and about 8 kilometres (5 mi) southwest of Bergamo. As of 31 December 2004, it had a population of 22,326 and an area of 11.6 square kilometres (4.5 mi^{2}).

The municipality of Dalmine contains the frazioni (subdivisions, mainly villages and hamlets) Sforzatica S. Maria d'Oleno, Sforzatica S. Andrea, Mariano al Brembo, Brembo, Guzzanica, and Sabbio.

Dalmine borders the following municipalities: Bonate Sotto, Filago, Lallio, Levate, Osio Sopra, Stezzano, Treviolo.

== Demographic evolution ==
Historical population

| Year | Pop. | ±% |
|---|---|---|
| 1861 | 2,401 | — |
| 1871 | 2,450 | +2.0% |
| 1881 | 2,521 | +2.9% |
| 1901 | 2,781 | +10.3% |
| 1911 | 3,435 | +23.5% |

| Year | Pop. | ±% |
|---|---|---|
| 1921 | 4,486 | +30.6% |
| 1931 | 6,026 | +34.3% |
| 1936 | 6,614 | +9.8% |
| 1951 | 8,510 | +28.7% |
| 1961 | 12,281 | +44.3% |

| Year | Pop. | ±% |
|---|---|---|
| 1971 | 15,035 | +22.4% |
| 1981 | 16,808 | +11.8% |
| 1991 | 18,511 | +10.1% |
| 2001 | 21,459 | +15.9% |

Source: Data from ISTAT

== Transportation ==
- Verdello-Dalmine railway station lies 8 km (5.0 mi) from the town; Bergamo railway station is 9 km (5.6 mi) from the town.
