= Solza =

- Comune
- Comune di Solza
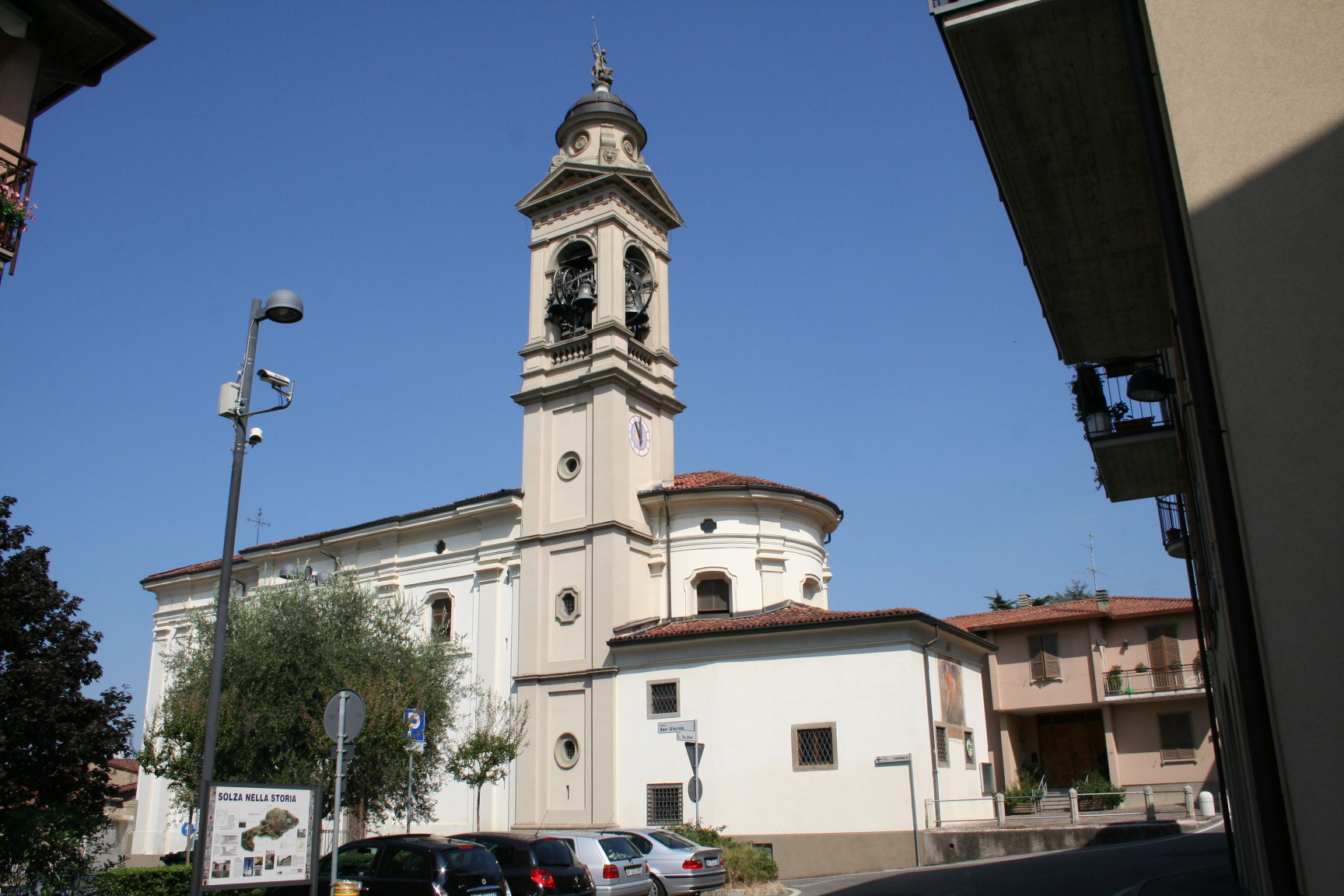

- Coat of arms

- Location within Italy Location within Lombardy
- Coordinates: 45°41′N 9°29′E
- Country: Italy
- Region: Lombardy
- Province: Bergamo (BG)

Government
  - Mayor: Maria Carla Rocca

Area
  - Total: 1.23 km^{2} (0.47 sq mi)
- Elevation: 254 m (833 ft)

Population (30 November 2016)
  - Total: 2,079
  - Density: 1,690/km^{2} (4,380/sq mi)
- Demonym: Solzesi
- Time zone: UTC+1 (CET)
  - Summer (DST): UTC+2 (CEST)
- Postal code: 24030
- Dialing code: 035
- Website: Official website

Solza (Bergamasque: Sólsa) is a comune (municipality) in the Province of Bergamo in the Italian region of Lombardy, located about 35 kilometres (22 mi) northeast of Milan and about 14 kilometres (9 mi) west of Bergamo.

Solza borders the following municipalities: Calusco d'Adda, Medolago. It is the birthplace of medieval condottiero Bartolomeo Colleoni.
