= Madone =

- Comune
- Comune di Madone
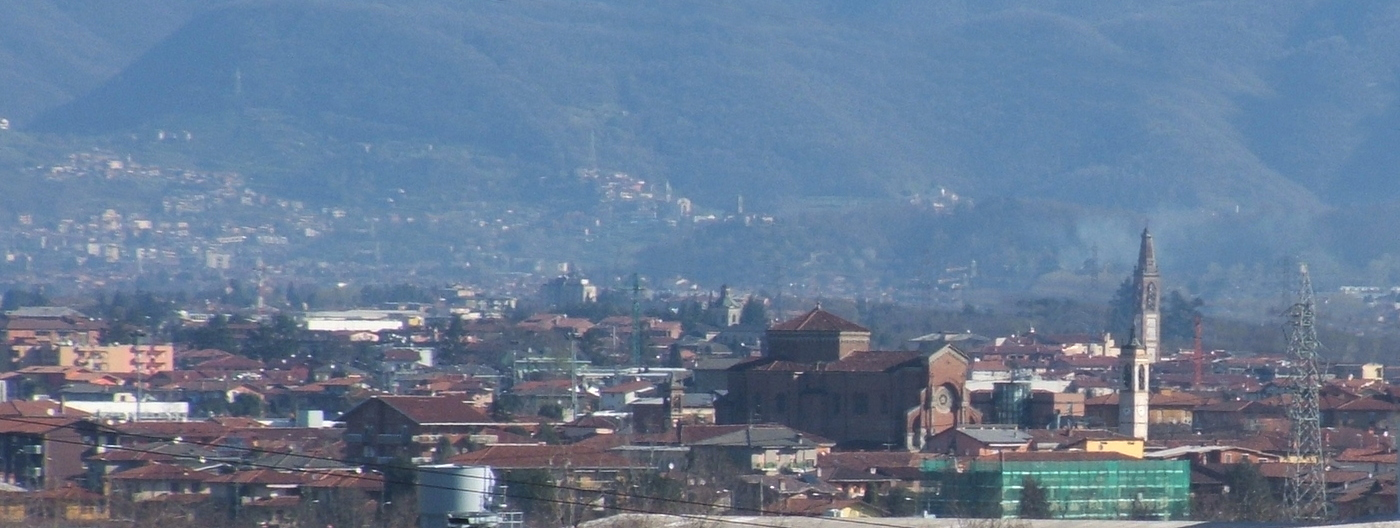
- Madone

- Coat of arms

- Location within Italy Location within Lombardy
- Coordinates: 45°39′N 9°33′E
- Country: Italy
- Region: Lombardy
- Province: Province of Bergamo (BG)

Area
  - Total: 3.0 km^{2} (1.2 sq mi)
- Elevation: 202 m (663 ft)

Population (Dec. 2004)
  - Total: 3,501
  - Density: 1,200/km^{2} (3,000/sq mi)
- Demonym: Madonesi
- Time zone: UTC+1 (CET)
  - Summer (DST): UTC+2 (CEST)
- Postal code: 24040
- Dialing code: 035

Madone (Bergamasque: Madù) is a comune (municipality) in the Province of Bergamo in the Italian region of Lombardy, located about 35 kilometres (22 mi) northeast of Milan and about 11 kilometres (7 mi) southwest of Bergamo. As of 31 December 2004, it had a population of 3,501 and an area of 3.0 square kilometres (1.2 mi^{2}).

Madone borders the following municipalities: Bonate Sotto, Bottanuco, Chignolo d'Isola, Filago.

== Demographic evolution ==
Historical population

Year	Pop.	±%
1861	466	—
1871	532	+14.2%
1881	537	+0.9%
1901	678	+26.3%
1911	802	+18.3%

Year	Pop.	±%
1921	894	+11.5%
1931	1,048	+17.2%
1936	1,027	−2.0%
1951	1,138	+10.8%
1961	1,340	+17.8%

Year	Pop.	±%
1971	1,851	+38.1%
1981	2,553	+37.9%
1991	2,782	+9.0%
2001	3,181	+14.3%

Source: Data from ISTAT

== Twin towns ==
Madone is twinned with:

- Dissay, France
- Vila Nova da Barquinha, Portugal
