= Bonate Sopra =

- Comune
- Comune di Bonate Sopra
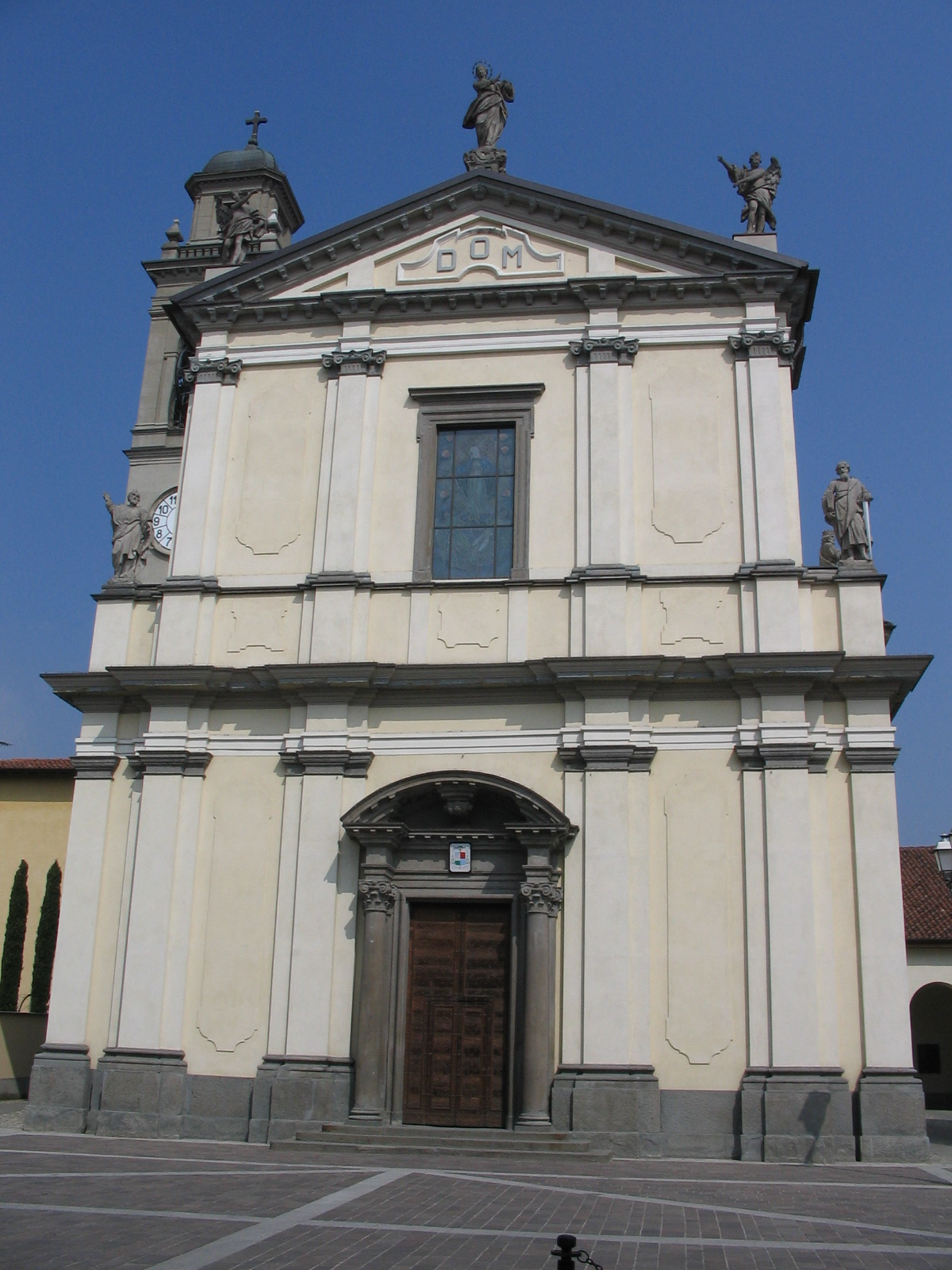
- Church in Bonate Sopra

- Coat of arms

- Location within Italy Location within Lombardy
- Coordinates: 45°41′N 9°34′E
- Country: Italy
- Region: Lombardy
- Province: Province of Bergamo (BG)
- Frazioni: Ghiaie di Bonate Sopra, Cabanetti

Area
  - Total: 5.9 km^{2} (2.3 sq mi)
- Elevation: 320 m (1,050 ft)

Population (Dec. 2004)
  - Total: 7,042
  - Density: 1,200/km^{2} (3,100/sq mi)
- Demonym: Bonatesi
- Time zone: UTC+1 (CET)
  - Summer (DST): UTC+2 (CEST)
- Postal code: 24040
- Dialing code: 035
- Website: Official website

Bonate Sopra (Bergamasque: Bunàt Sura) is a comune (municipality) in the Province of Bergamo in the Italian region Lombardy, located about 40 kilometres (25 mi) northeast of Milan and about 8 kilometres (5 mi) west of Bergamo. As of 31 December 2004, it had a population of 7,042 and an area of 5.9 square kilometres (2.3 mi^{2}).

The municipality of Bonate Sopra contains the frazioni (subdivisions, mainly villages and hamlets) Ghiaie di Bonate Sopra and Cabanetti.

Bonate Sopra borders the following municipalities: Bonate Sotto, Chignolo d'Isola, Curno, Mapello, Ponte San Pietro, Presezzo, Terno d'Isola, Treviolo.

== Madonna delle Ghiaie ==
The region is notable for being the site of controversial Marian apparitions in 1944. 7-year-old Adelaide Roncalli, a resident of Torchio, said she had seen the Holy Family on May 13 of that year and on subsequent days. She also said the Blessed Mother appeared alone and gave her brief messages. The news spread rapidly and huge crowds soon flooded the town from all over Europe. The last reported visitation had a reported 200,000 people in attendance. Although Ms. Roncalli was forced to retract her statements, as an adult she claimed she had been coerced and bullied by the priests and maintained that she actually had seen something. The "Madonna of Ghiaie" is now being investigated by the Roman Catholic Church.

== Demographic evolution ==
Historical population

Year	Pop.	±%
1861	1,725	—
1871	1,781	+3.2%
1881	1,899	+6.6%
1901	2,219	+16.9%
1911	2,505	+12.9%

Year	Pop.	±%
1921	2,599	+3.8%
1931	2,990	+15.0%
1936	3,090	+3.3%
1951	3,381	+9.4%
1961	3,952	+16.9%

Year	Pop.	±%
1971	4,365	+10.5%
1981	4,751	+8.8%
1991	5,212	+9.7%
2001	6,238	+19.7%

Source: Data from ISTAT
