= Dissay =

- Commune
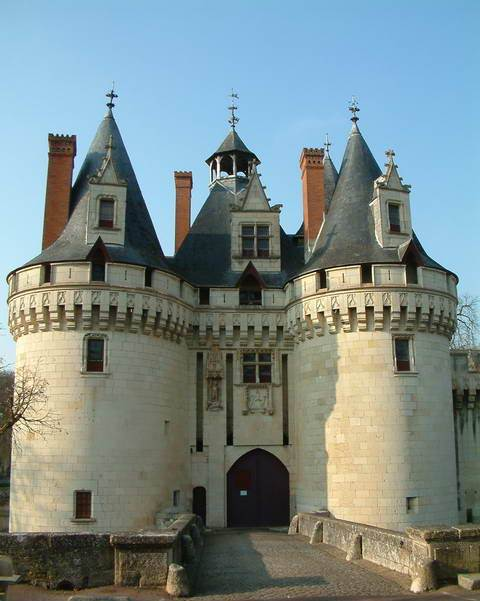
- Castle of Dissay

- Coat of arms
- Location of Dissay
- Location within France Location within Nouvelle-Aquitaine
- Coordinates: 46°42′06″N 0°25′57″E
- Country: France
- Region: Nouvelle-Aquitaine
- Department: Vienne
- Arrondissement: Poitiers
- Canton: Jaunay-Marigny
- Intercommunality: CU Grand Poitiers

Government
  - Mayor (2020–2026): Michel François
- Area^{1}: 23.71 km^{2} (9.15 sq mi)
- Elevation: 64 m (210 ft)
- Highest elevation: 144 m (472 ft)
- Lowest elevation: 60 m (200 ft)
- Population (2023): 3,101
  - Density: 130.8/km^{2} (338.7/sq mi)
- Time zone: UTC+01:00 (CET)
  - Summer (DST): UTC+02:00 (CEST)
- INSEE/Postal code: 86095 /86130
- ^{1} French Land Register data, which excludes lakes, ponds, glaciers > 1 km^{2} (0.386 sq mi or 247 acres) and river estuaries.

Dissay (French pronunciation: [disɛ]) is a commune in the Vienne department in the Nouvelle-Aquitaine region in western France. The main landmark is the castle, built in the 15th century by Pierre d'Amboise, bishop of Poitiers.

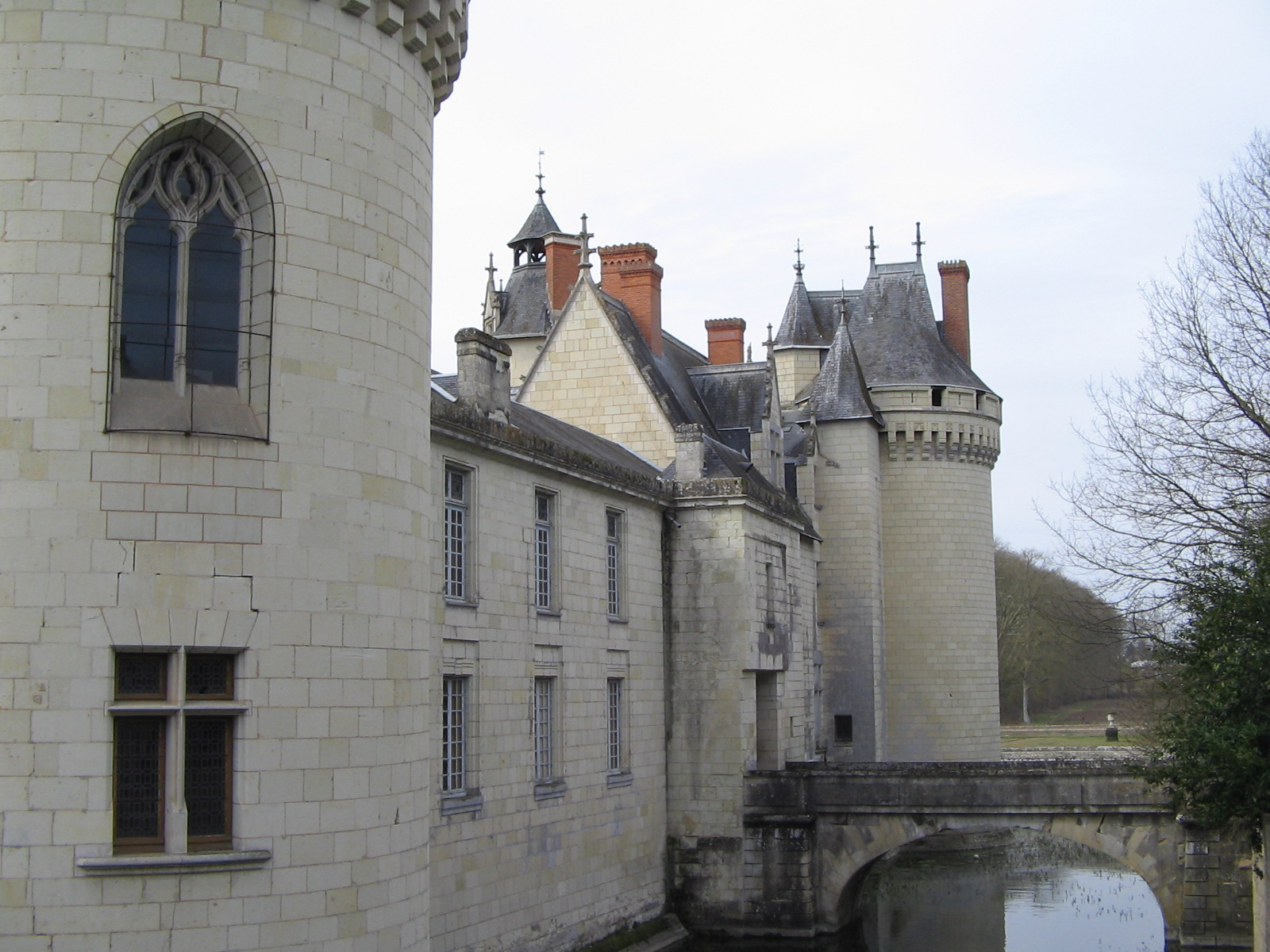
Castle

== History ==
Human settlement in the territory of Dissay dates back millennia: a single grave in Poitou-Charentes dates back to 4300 BC. Gallo-Roman houses spring up along the Roman road that links Saintes to Poitiers Tours. The territory of Dissay is arranged like an axis, with this road as one of the lines. Tradition maintains the "Roman road" as a recurring term for that road.

== Population ==
Historical population
Year	Pop.	±% p.a.
1968	1,436	—
1975	1,745	+2.82%
1982	2,464	+5.05%
1990	2,498	+0.17%
1999	2,634	+0.59%
2007	2,912	+1.26%
2012	3,143	+1.54%
2017	3,233	+0.57%
2023	3,101	−0.69%
Source: INSEE

== Economy ==
Dissay is located between Poitiers and Châtellerault. As of 2019, its labor force is of 1,617 active workers (activity rate: 79.9%). More than 80 merchants, artisans, industries and services are currently located in the town center and the two parks of the town.

== Twin towns ==
- Madone, Italy

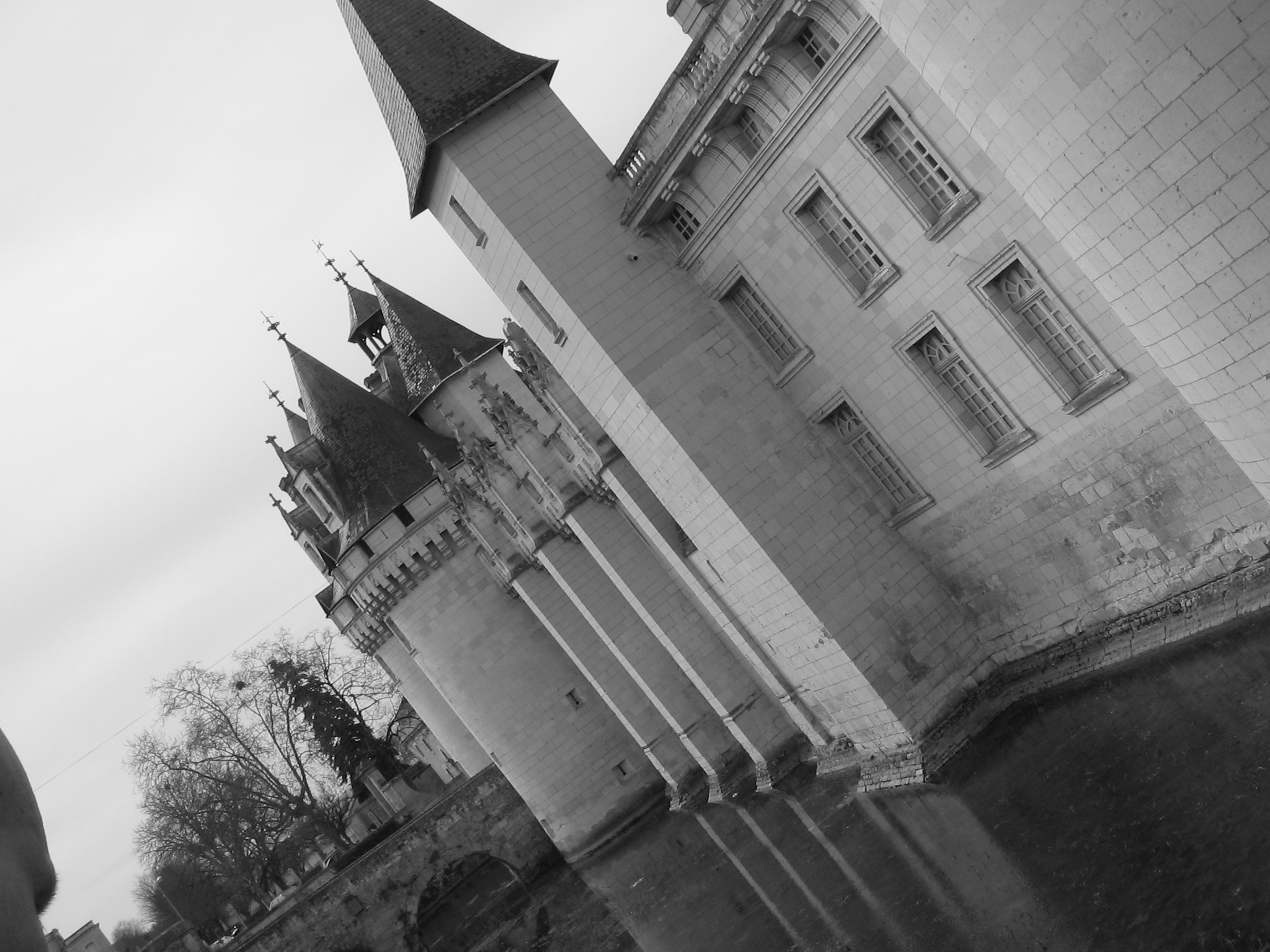
Castle

== See also ==
- Communes of the Vienne department
