= Villa d'Adda =

Villa d'Adda Éla d'Ada
- Comune
- Comune di Villa d'Adda
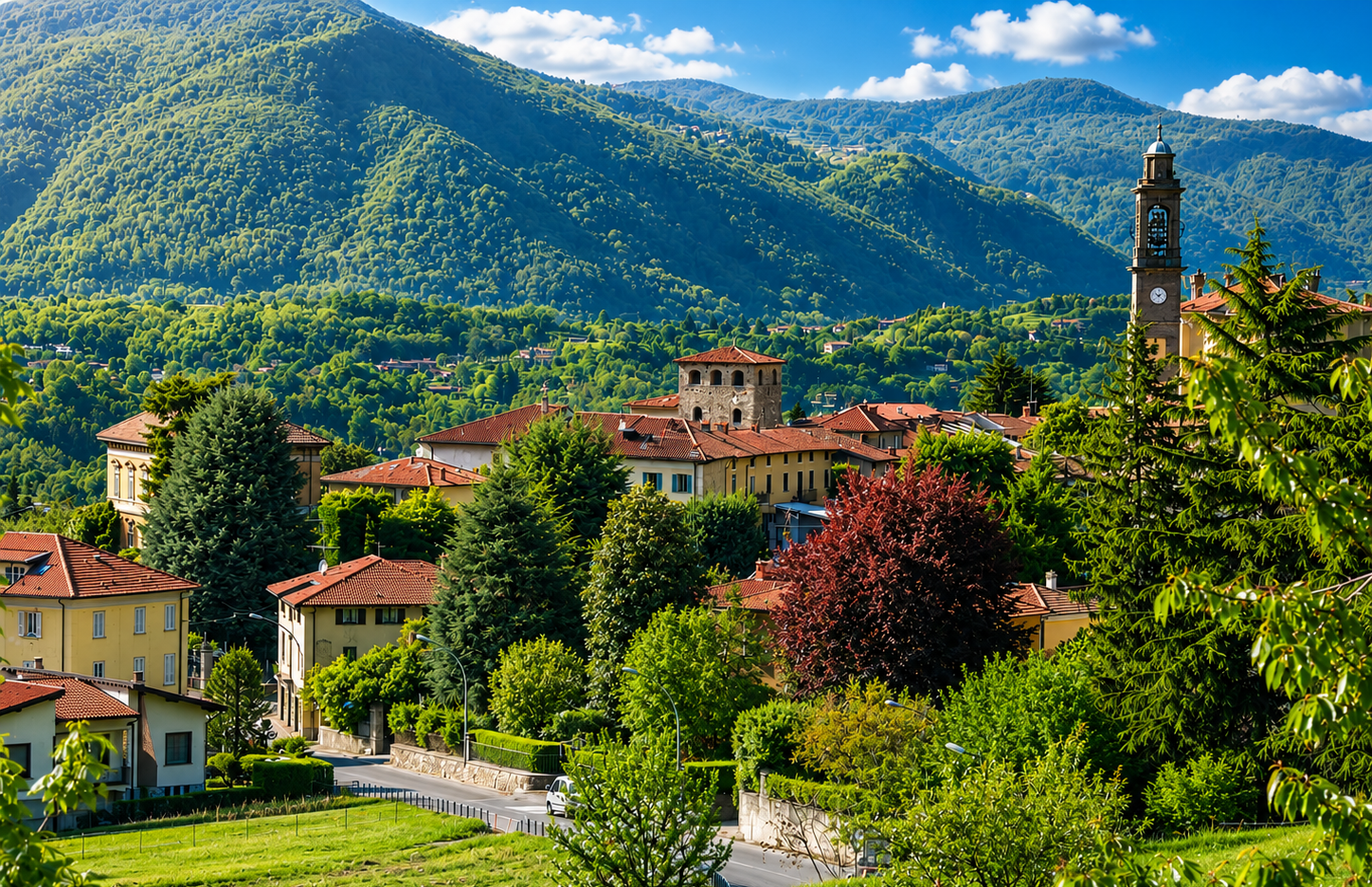
- Villa d'Adda

- Location within Italy Location within Lombardy
- Coordinates: 45°43′N 9°28′E
- Country: Italy
- Region: Lombardy
- Province: Province of Bergamo (BG)

Government
  - Mayor: Gianfranco Biffi

Area
  - Total: 5.98 km^{2} (2.31 sq mi)
- Elevation: 286 m (938 ft)

Population (November 2012)
  - Total: 4,754
  - Density: 795/km^{2} (2,060/sq mi)
- Demonym: Villadaddesi
- Time zone: UTC+1 (CET)
  - Summer (DST): UTC+2 (CEST)
- Postal code: 24030
- Dialing code: 035
- Patron saint: St. Andrew
- Saint day: 30 November
- Website: Official website

Villa d'Adda (Bergamasque: Éla d'Ada; Brianzöö: Vila d'Ada; Latin: Villa Ripae Abduae) is a comune (municipality) in the Province of Bergamo in the Italian region of Lombardy, located about 35 kilometres (22 mi) northeast of Milan and about 15 kilometres (9 mi) west of Bergamo. As of November 2012, it had a population of 4,754 and an area of 5.98 square kilometres (2.31 mi^{2}).

Villa d'Adda borders the following municipalities: Brivio, Calco, Calusco d'Adda, Carvico, Imbersago, Pontida, Robbiate.

== Demographic evolution ==
Historical population

Year	Pop.	±%
1861	2,372	—
1871	2,267	−4.4%
1881	2,326	+2.6%
1901	2,365	+1.7%
1911	2,617	+10.7%

Year	Pop.	±%
1921	2,716	+3.8%
1931	2,556	−5.9%
1936	2,257	−11.7%
1951	2,610	+15.6%
1961	2,564	−1.8%

Year	Pop.	±%
1971	2,873	+12.1%
1981	3,271	+13.9%
1991	3,703	+13.2%
2001	4,195	+13.3%

Source: Data from ISTAT

== In popular culture ==
Villa d'Adda is mentioned in the song Negri in fiamme by the local band Un gruppo.
