= Verdellino =

- Comune
- Comune di Verdellino
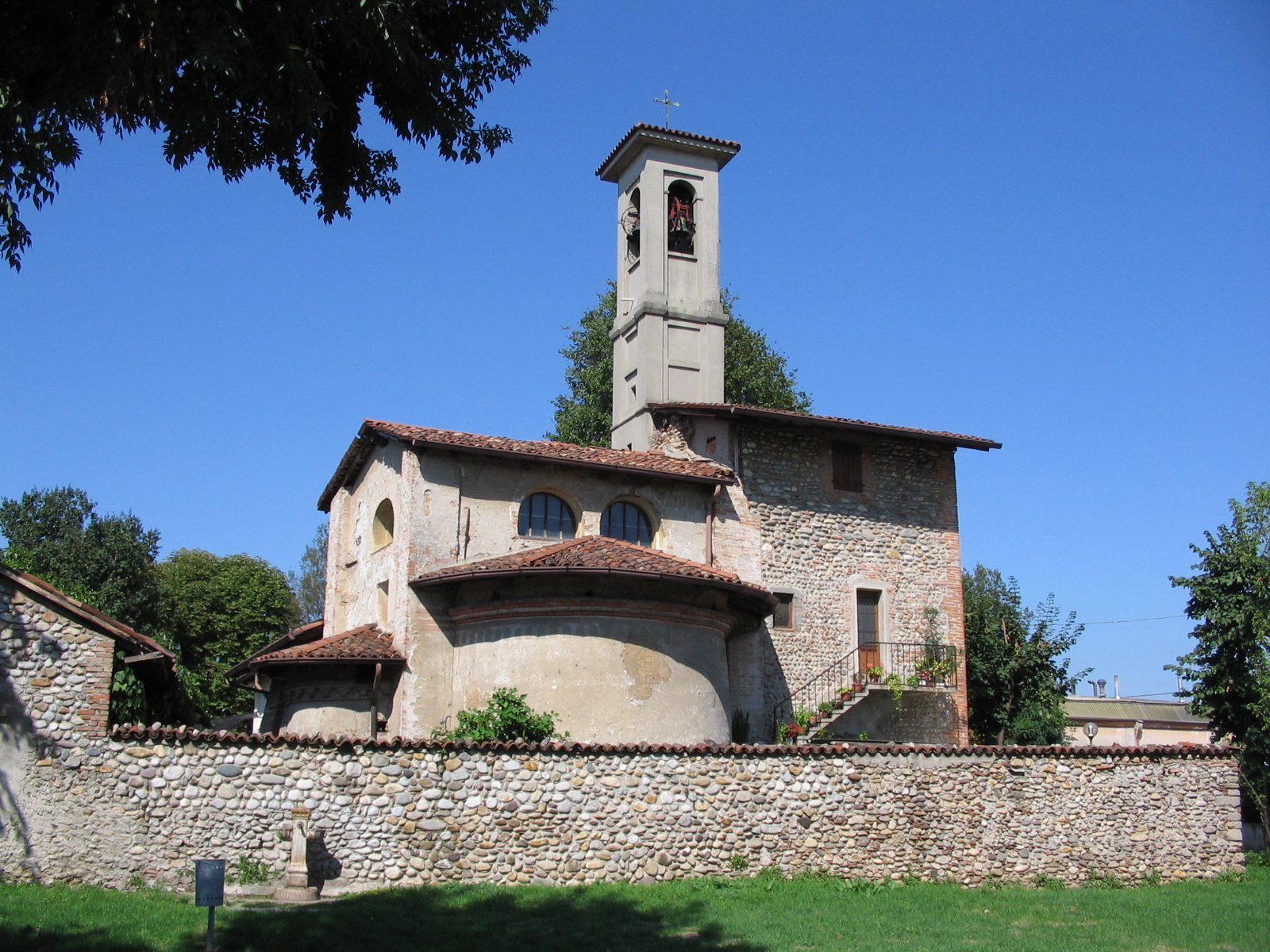
- Church

- Location within Italy Location within Lombardy
- Coordinates: 45°36′N 9°37′E
- Country: Italy
- Region: Lombardy
- Province: Province of Bergamo (BG)

Area
  - Total: 3.8 km^{2} (1.5 sq mi)
- Elevation: 172 m (564 ft)

Population (Dec. 2004)
  - Total: 7,186
  - Density: 1,900/km^{2} (4,900/sq mi)
- Demonym: Verdellinesi
- Time zone: UTC+1 (CET)
  - Summer (DST): UTC+2 (CEST)
- Postal code: 24049
- Dialing code: 035

Verdellino (Bergamasque: Erdelì) is a comune (municipality) in the Province of Bergamo in the Italian region of Lombardy, located about 40 kilometres (25 mi) northeast of Milan and about 12 kilometres (7 mi) southwest of Bergamo. The town is easily reachable by train, the station of Verdello-Dalmine is in fact located on Verdellino's soil and the stop is one of several on the railroad line that connects the two cities of Bergamo and Milan. As of 31 December 2004, it had a population of 7,186 and an area of 3.8 square kilometres (1.5 mi^{2}).

Verdellino borders the following municipalities: Boltiere, Ciserano, Levate, Osio Sotto, Verdello.

== Demographic evolution ==
Historical population

Year	Pop.	±%
1861	994	—
1871	984	−1.0%
1881	1,086	+10.4%
1901	1,242	+14.4%
1911	1,361	+9.6%

Year	Pop.	±%
1921	1,410	+3.6%
1931	1,550	+9.9%
1936	1,618	+4.4%
1951	1,764	+9.0%
1961	1,953	+10.7%

Year	Pop.	±%
1971	4,150	+112.5%
1981	5,667	+36.6%
1991	6,537	+15.4%
2001	6,697	+2.4%

Source: Data from ISTAT

== Transportation ==
- Verdello-Dalmine railway station
