= Riccardo Cerini =

Italian footballer

Personal information
- Full name: Riccardo Cerini
- Date of birth: 18 October 2000 (age 26)
- Place of birth: Italy
- Height: 1.84 m (6 ft 0 in)
- Position: Defender

Team information
- Current team: San Pietro

Senior career*
Years	Team	Apps	(Gls)
2018–2019	San Pietro	29	(0)
2019–2021	AlbinoLeffe	17	(0)
2021–	San Pietro	0	(0)
- * Club domestic league appearances and goals as of 3 April 2021

Riccardo Cerini (born 18 October 2000) is an Italian professional footballer who plays as a defender for Serie D club Ponte San Pietro.

== Club career ==
On 27 September 2020, Cerini made his debut in Serie C for AlbinoLeffe. On 31 August 2021, Cerini left AlbinoLeffe by mutual consent.

On 6 September 2021, he returned to San Pietro on Serie D.
