= Calusco d'Adda =

- Comune
- Comune di Calusco d'Adda
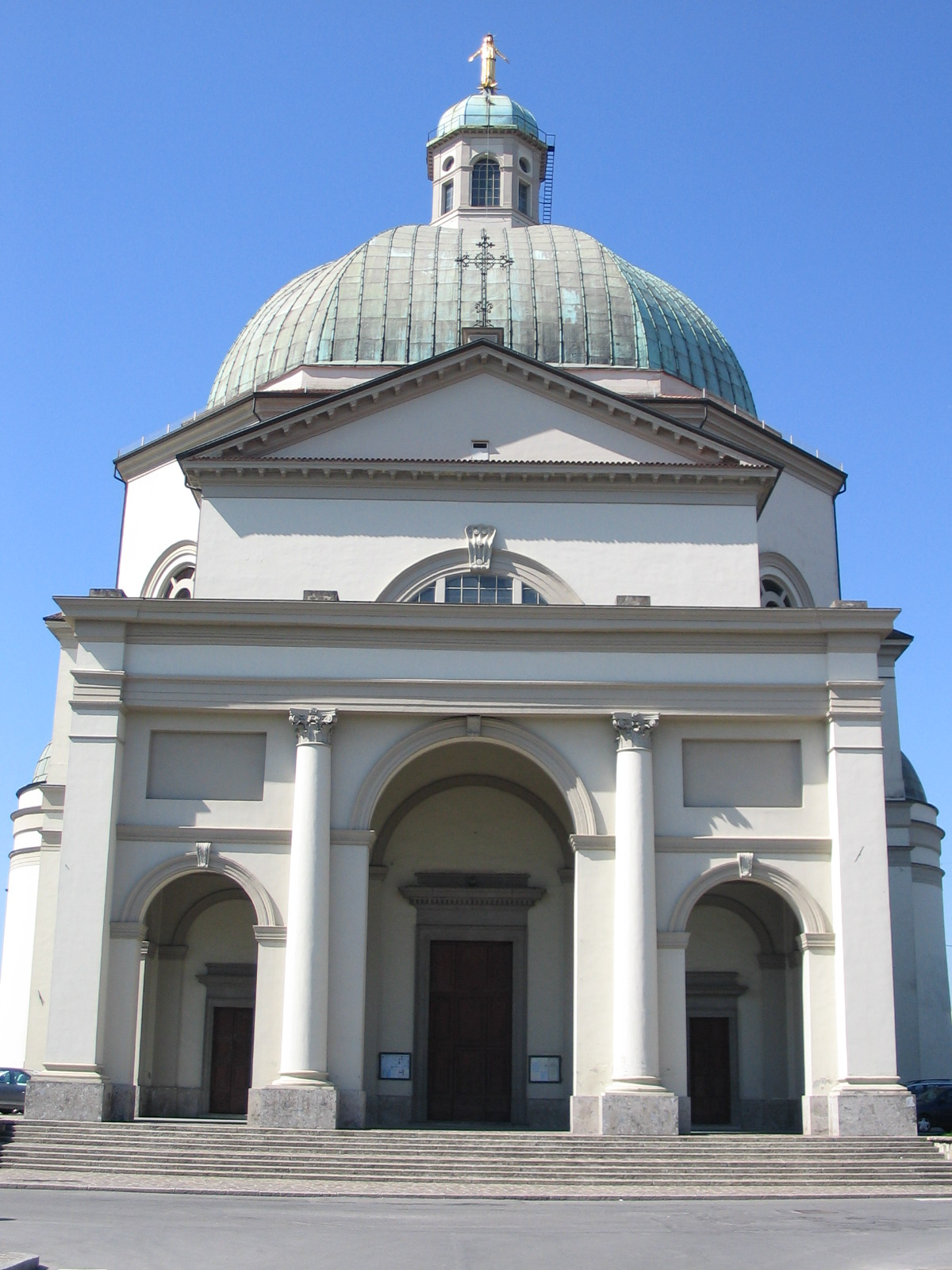
- Church

- Coat of arms

- Location within Italy Location within Lombardy
- Coordinates: 45°41′N 9°29′E
- Country: Italy
- Region: Lombardy
- Province: Bergamo (BG)

Government
  - Mayor: Michele Pellegrini

Area
  - Total: 8.33 km^{2} (3.22 sq mi)
- Elevation: 273 m (896 ft)

Population (30 April 2017)
  - Total: 8,345
  - Density: 1,000/km^{2} (2,590/sq mi)
- Demonym: Caluschesi
- Time zone: UTC+1 (CET)
  - Summer (DST): UTC+2 (CEST)
- Postal code: 24033
- Dialing code: 035
- Website: Official website

Calusco d'Adda (Bergamasque, Brianzöö: Calösch) is a comune (municipality) in the Province of Bergamo in the Italian region of Lombardy, located about 35 kilometres (22 mi) northeast of Milan and about 14 kilometres (9 mi) west of Bergamo.

Calusco d'Adda borders the following municipalities: Carvico, Medolago, Paderno d'Adda, Robbiate, Solza, Terno d'Isola, Villa d'Adda.

== Twin towns ==
Calusco d'Adda is twinned with:

- Volmerange-les-Mines, France
