= Chignolo d'Isola =

Chignolo d'Isola Chignöl (Lombard)
- Comune
- Comune di Chignolo d'Isola
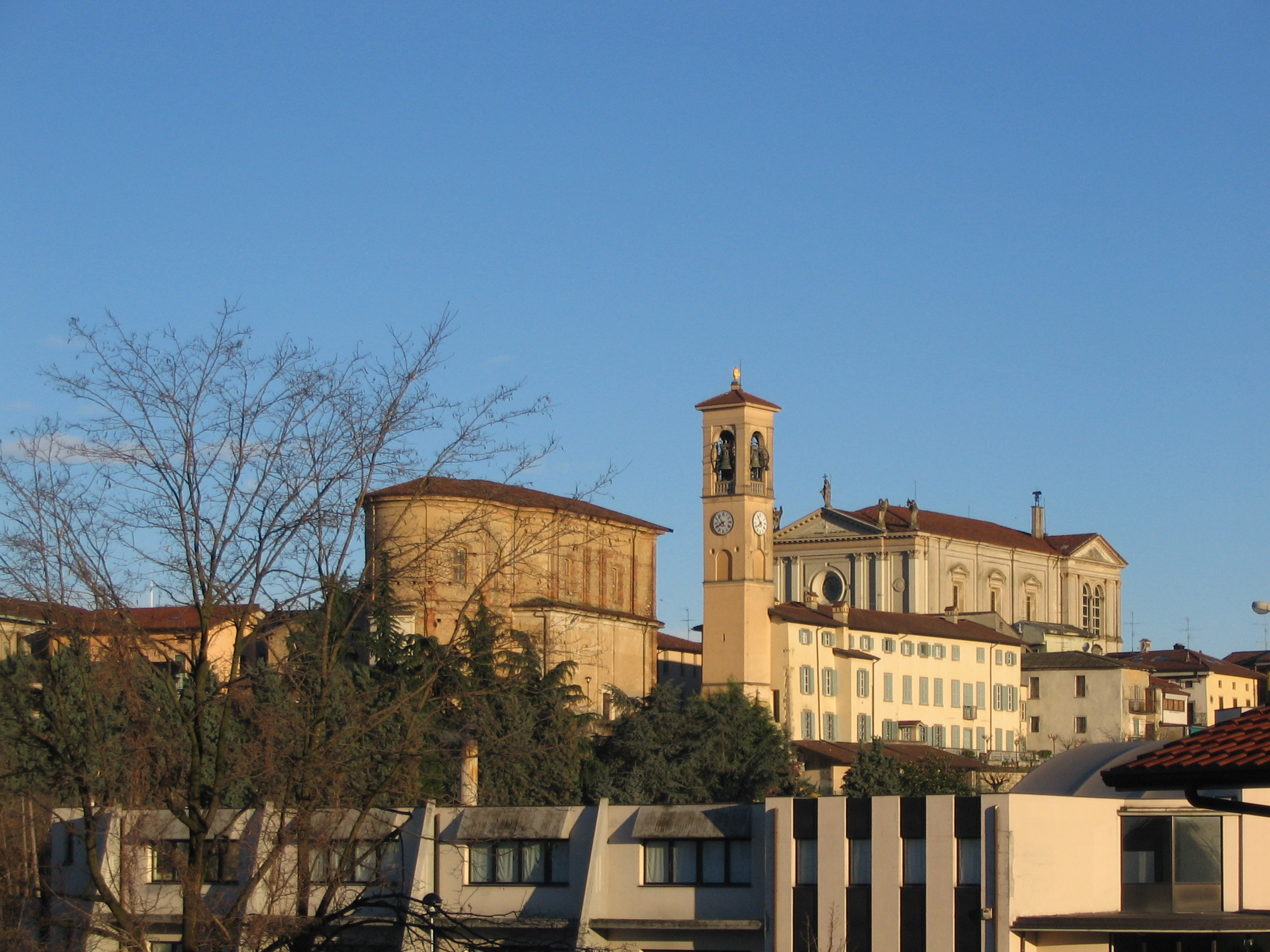
- Chignolo d'Isola

- Location within Italy Location within Lombardy
- Coordinates: 45°40′N 9°32′E
- Country: Italy
- Region: Lombardy
- Province: Province of Bergamo (BG)

Area
  - Total: 5.3 km^{2} (2.0 sq mi)
- Elevation: 229 m (751 ft)

Population (Dec. 2004)
  - Total: 2,849
  - Density: 540/km^{2} (1,400/sq mi)
- Demonym: Chignolesi
- Time zone: UTC+1 (CET)
  - Summer (DST): UTC+2 (CEST)
- Postal code: 24040
- Dialing code: 035

Chignolo d'Isola (Italian: [kiɲˈɲɔːlo ˈdiːzola]; Bergamasque: Chignöl [kiˈɲøl]) is a comune (municipality) in the Province of Bergamo in the Italian region of Lombardy, located about 35 kilometres (22 mi) northeast of Milan and about 11 kilometres (7 mi) southwest of Bergamo. As of 31 December 2004, it had a population of 2,849 and an area of 5.3 square kilometres (2.0 mi^{2}).

Chignolo d'Isola borders the following municipalities: Bonate Sopra, Bonate Sotto, Bottanuco, Madone, Medolago, Suisio, Terno d'Isola.

In the territory of Chignolo d'Isola on 26 February 2010 the body of Yara Gambirasio was found.

== Demographic evolution ==
Historical population

| Year | Pop. | ±% |
|---|---|---|
| 1861 | 1,073 | — |
| 1871 | 1,099 | +2.4% |
| 1881 | 1,062 | −3.4% |
| 1901 | 1,218 | +14.7% |
| 1911 | 1,314 | +7.9% |

| Year | Pop. | ±% |
|---|---|---|
| 1921 | 1,380 | +5.0% |
| 1931 | 1,407 | +2.0% |
| 1936 | 1,385 | −1.6% |
| 1951 | 1,542 | +11.3% |
| 1961 | 1,598 | +3.6% |

| Year | Pop. | ±% |
|---|---|---|
| 1971 | 1,797 | +12.5% |
| 1981 | 1,948 | +8.4% |
| 1991 | 2,184 | +12.1% |
| 2001 | 2,702 | +23.7% |

Source: Data from ISTAT
