= Terno d'Isola =

- Comune
- Comune di Terno d'Isola
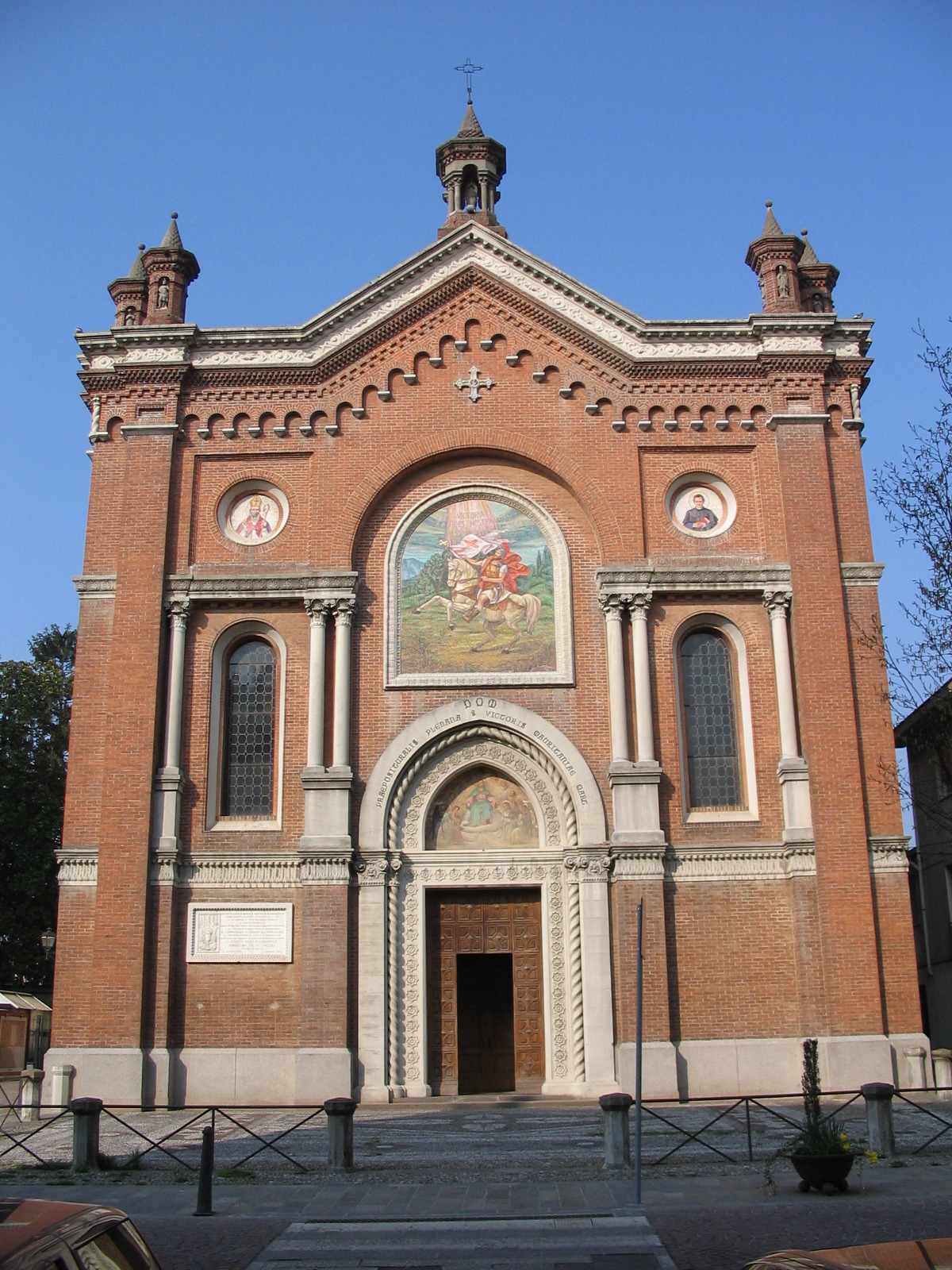
- Church

- Coat of arms

- Location within Italy Location within Lombardy
- Coordinates: 45°41′N 9°32′E
- Country: Italy
- Region: Lombardy
- Province: Province of Bergamo (BG)

Area
  - Total: 4.0 km^{2} (1.5 sq mi)
- Elevation: 299 m (981 ft)

Population (Dec. 2004)
  - Total: 6,004
  - Density: 1,500/km^{2} (3,900/sq mi)
- Demonym: Ternesi
- Time zone: UTC+1 (CET)
  - Summer (DST): UTC+2 (CEST)
- Postal code: 24030
- Dialing code: 035
- Website: Official website

Terno d'Isola (Bergamasque: Téren) is a comune (municipality) in the Province of Bergamo in the Italian region of Lombardy, located about 35 kilometres (22 mi) northeast of Milan and about 11 kilometres (7 mi) west of Bergamo. As of 31 December 2004, it had a population of 6,004 and an area of 4.0 square kilometres (1.5 mi^{2}).

Terno d'Isola borders the following municipalities: Bonate Sopra, Calusco d'Adda, Carvico, Chignolo d'Isola, Mapello, Medolago, Sotto il Monte Giovanni XXIII.

== Geography ==
The town is located in the Bergamo area, is about 12 kilometres (7 mi) from the provincial seat.

== History ==
The first permanent settlements occurred in Roman times, when the conquistadors instituted a territorial district in the area called "Pagus Fortunensis". In that historical period, the village, as well as the entire area of the island was affected by strong trade and military, given the presence of two important roads of communication that mark the territory: one between the cities of Bergamo and Milan to south, and another that linked the capital Orobico in Como in the north. The term Roman Empire was subject to Terno barbarian invasions that took years of looting and terrorizing the population. In the sixth century, the political situation stabilized with the arrival first of the Lombards, and then the Franks. Terno in this period was considered the island's main town, so that the neighboring towns were placed under the jurisdiction of his parish church: in this sense is a valuable written record that dates back to 774, confirming the new order of the Parish of Terni. However, in the late Middle Ages that saw this situation as a town Terno pù important proved to be a profoundly destabilizing element, given the willingness of different lordships to gain dominance over it: many battles between the Guelphs and Ghibellines, and later between the armies of Milan and Venice, put a strain on the people who lived centuries of poverty, so that the island was called "the triangle of hunger." In this sense the description is very clear in a document of time: "Here there are no traffic nor merchandise, people are poor by lavoradori terre et bracenti, such grains do not collect a penalty for their living, and they have no privilege, but subject to all the tributes to datii et ... " Is there any news of devastation and looting, the main one being perpetrated in 1406 by troops of the leader Bartolomeo Colleoni. The situation seemed to improve with the arrival of the Republic of Venice, inserting Terno district called Quadra Island to establish it as the capital and seat of the mayor. The Venetians took over in 1797 the Cisalpine Republic in 1815 but soon replaced by the Austrians, who inserts it in the Kingdom of Lombardy-Veneto, moving the capital to Chignolo. With the unification of Italy was a first but decisive process of industrialization, which allowed a significant improvement of living conditions of population.

== Points of interest ==
The building is undoubtedly the most interesting provostal church of St. Victor, who played a key role in the history of the country and the whole area. It is no news as early as 774, when it was built in place of a previous building of pagan worship and had jurisdiction over the churches of the other villages of the island. Repeatedly subjected to renovation and rebuilding, still retains elements of the original structure, and a neo-Gothic facade and numerous sculptures and paintings, among which they include some of Enea Salmeggia and Bartolomeo Nazari.

== Folkloristic events ==
The week before the summer solstice, in Terno it's held the Palio di San Donato, a week of celebration involving all the community.

During this week, people dressed with medieval clothes behave as if the town was back in that period.

The Palio consists in a race of donkeys with 10 contendents belonging to different part of the town called contrade.

This Palio was held for the first time in 1984.

== Demographic evolution ==
Historical population

Year	Pop.	±%
1861	1,249	—
1871	1,321	+5.8%
1881	1,304	−1.3%
1901	1,465	+12.3%
1911	1,708	+16.6%

Year	Pop.	±%
1921	1,886	+10.4%
1931	2,050	+8.7%
1936	1,818	−11.3%
1951	2,094	+15.2%
1961	2,360	+12.7%

Year	Pop.	±%
1971	2,789	+18.2%
1981	3,213	+15.2%
1991	3,471	+8.0%
2001	4,995	+43.9%

Source: Data from ISTAT
