= Osio Sopra =

- Comune
- Comune di Osio Sopra
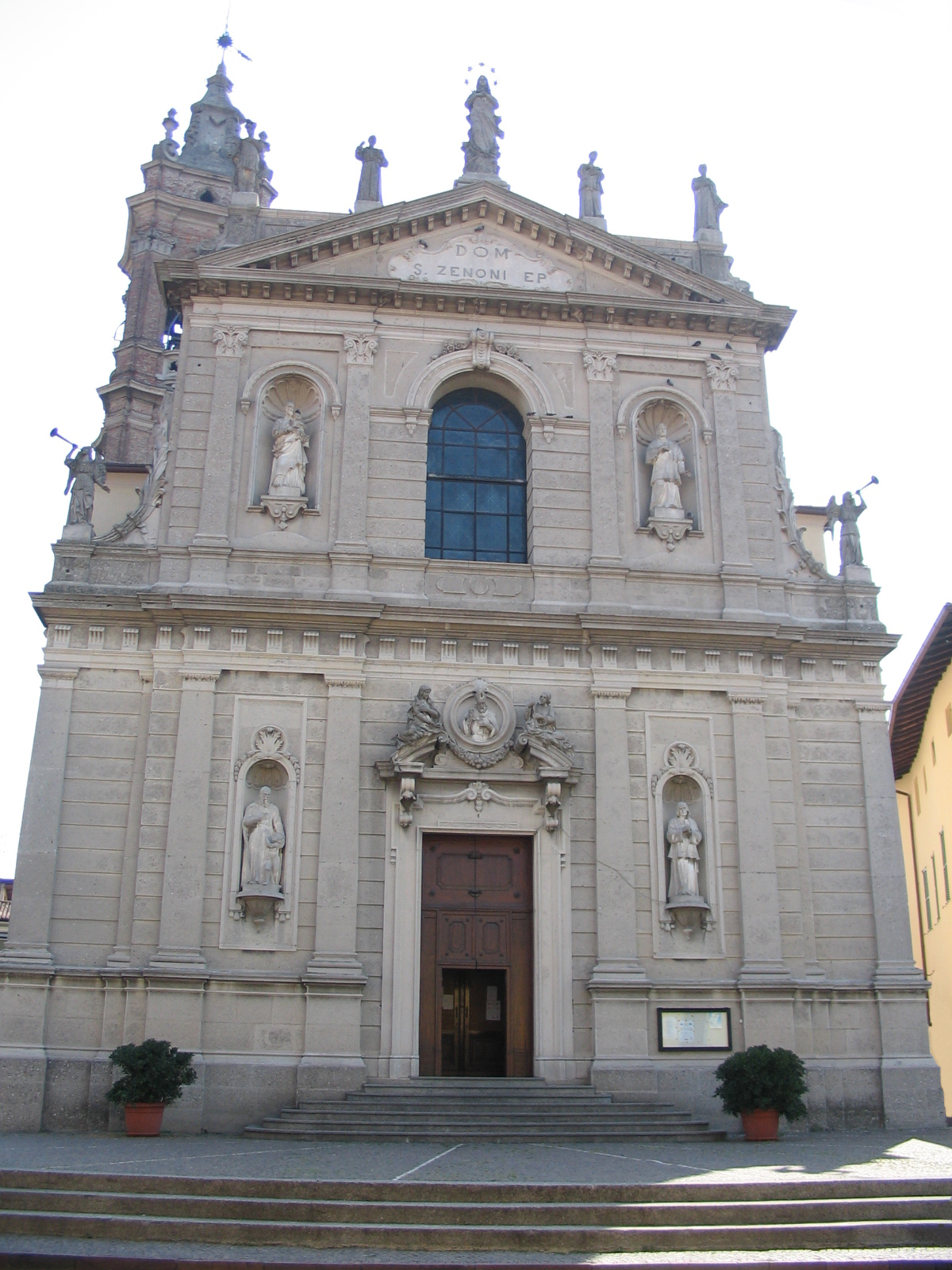
- Church of San Zenone

- Location within Italy Location within Lombardy
- Coordinates: 45°38′N 9°35′E
- Country: Italy
- Region: Lombardy
- Province: Province of Bergamo (BG)

Area
  - Total: 5 km^{2} (1.9 sq mi)
- Elevation: 192 m (630 ft)

Population (2018-01-01)
  - Total: 5.306
  - Density: 1.1/km^{2} (2.7/sq mi)
- Demonym: Osiosoprani
- Time zone: UTC+1 (CET)
  - Summer (DST): UTC+2 (CEST)
- Postal code: 24040
- Dialing code: 035
- Patron saint: San Zenone
- Saint day: 12 April
- Website: Official website

Osio Sopra (Bergamasque: Öss de Sura) is a comune (municipality) of 5,306 inhabitants in the province of Bergamo, Lombardy, Italy. The history of Osio Sopra has significant links to Osio Sotto's.

Early settlements can be traced to Ancient Roman times, when an important communication road linked Milan to Bergamo passing through the bridge 'Ponte Corvo' in the Marne locality. In Bergamo, the last section of this road was in-fact named 'via Osio', highlighting the importance of the location.

During those times, Osio underwent an important process of centuriation, with which a first development of the 'pagus' took place; the name 'Osio' originates from the Patrician 'gens Otia' (or gens Oxia).

Among Osio Sopra's landmarks, the medieval Catholic church of San Zenone features good quality paintings of Lombard artists. Legend has it that this sacred church was built with materials from an ancient castle.

The Santuario della Madonna della Scopa is a chapel located on the border Osio Sopra shares with Osio Sotto. Built in the fifteenth century, it was initially much smaller than it is today, with the most recent extension added at the beginning of the twentieth century. Religious frescoes cover its inner walls. According to the legend, the name of the chapel ('Madonna della scopa' is Italian for 'Madonna of the broom') is due to a miraculous apparition in which the Virgin Mary intervened to clean up this chapel at a time in which it had been abandoned.

Finally, Palazzo Camozzi-Andreani, also known as Villa Andreani or more colloquially as Palazzo delle Gigine, was built during the eighteenth century as a library.

Osio Sopra's western border consists of the river Brembo; along its shore, a number of natural reserves such as Bosco Astori are frequented by locals and visitors for recreational purposes.
