= Cornate d'Adda =

- Comune
- Città di Cornate d'Adda
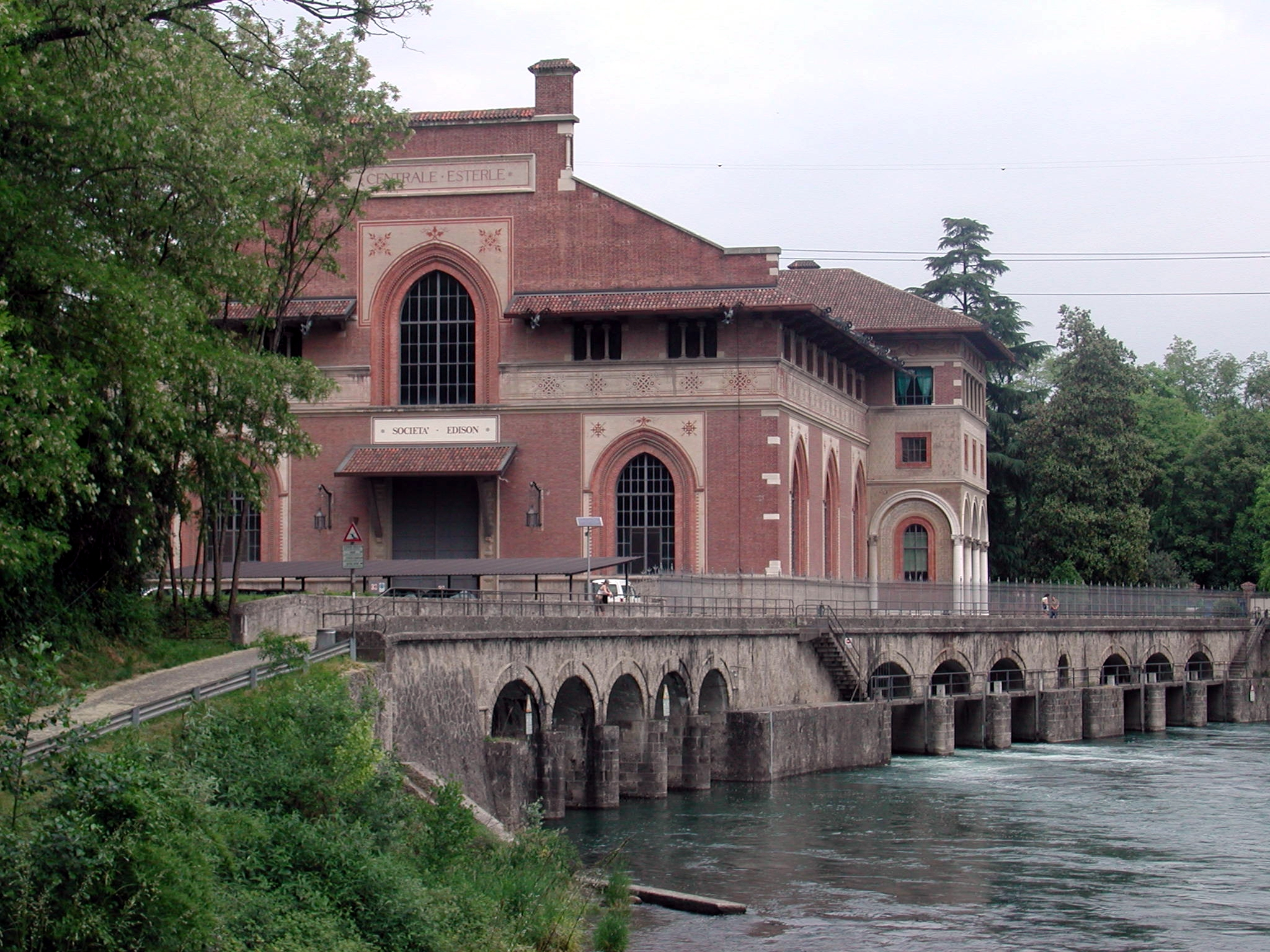
- Power plant Esterle on the Adda river.

- Coat of arms

- Position of Cornate d'Adda in the province of Monza and Brianza

- Location within Italy Location within Lombardy
- Coordinates: 45°39′N 9°28′E
- Country: Italy
- Region: Lombardy
- Province: Monza and Brianza (MB)
- Frazioni: Colnago, Porto d'Adda, Villa Paradiso

Government
  - Mayor: Giuseppe Felice Colombo (since 27 May 2019) (Lega Nord)

Area
  - Total: 13.6 km^{2} (5.3 sq mi)
- Elevation: 236 m (774 ft)

Population (31 December 2014)
  - Total: 10,710
  - Density: 787/km^{2} (2,040/sq mi)
- Demonym: Cornatesi
- Time zone: UTC+1 (CET)
  - Summer (DST): UTC+2 (CEST)
- Postal code: 20862
- Dialing code: 039
- Patron saint: san Luigi
- Website: Official website

Cornate d'Adda (Curnàa in the Brianza dialect, and simply Cornate until 1924) is a comune of 10,799 inhabitants in the province of Monza and Brianza, and it is 21 km away from Monza, the provincial capital. It is part of the Vimercatese and of the Parco Adda Nord. The frazioni of Colnago and of Porto d'Adda are part of the municipal territory.

The square of Cornate is called the XV Martyrs, as a re-enactment of the 15 partisans shot in Milan, in Piazzale Loreto, on 10 August 1944 by the Nazi. On 29 May 2018 the President of the Republic conferred the title of "City of Cornate d'Adda".
