= Cristoforo Crespi =

Italian entrepreneur

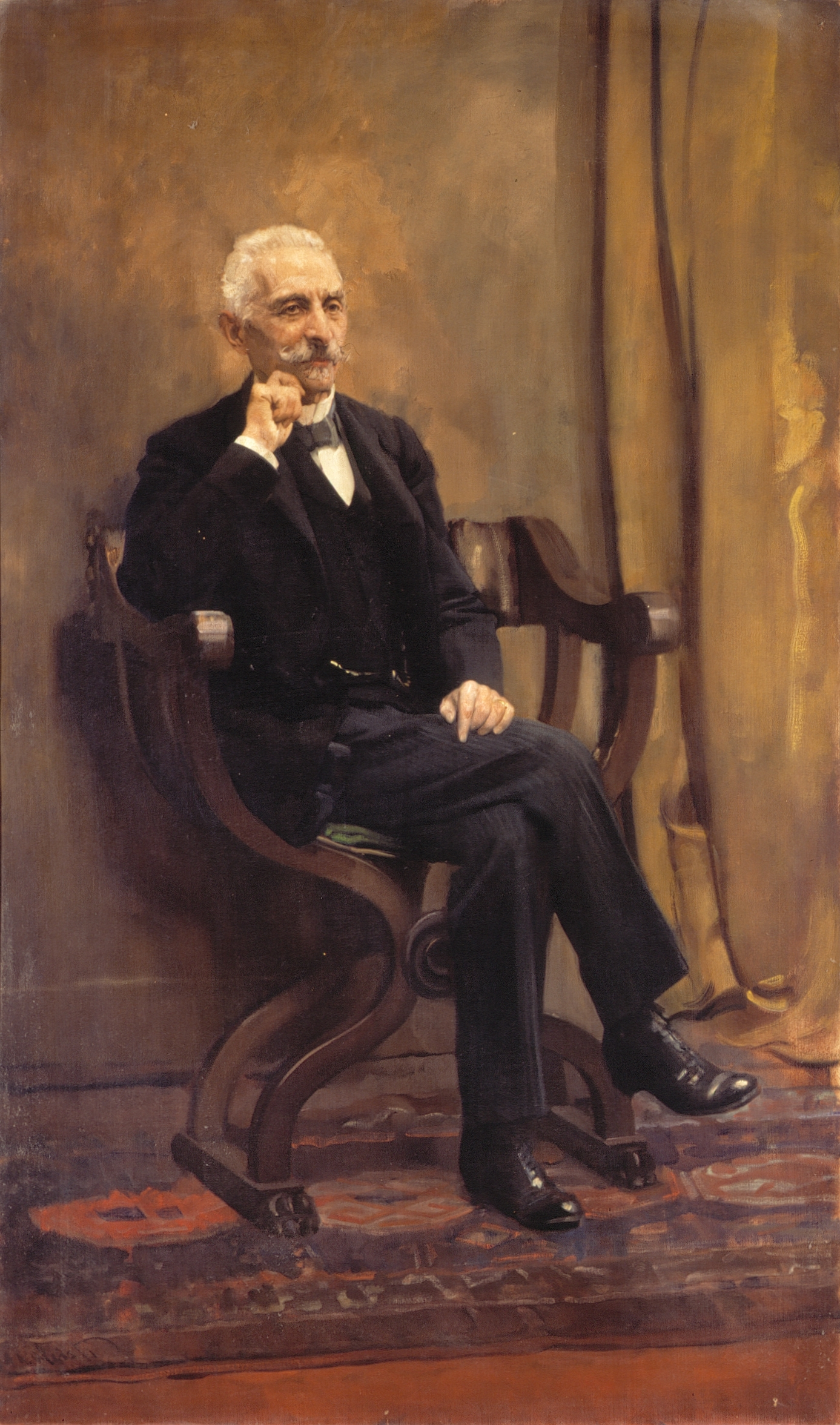
Cristoforo Benigno Crespi

Cristoforo Benigno Crespi (18 October 1833 in Busto Arsizio – 5 January 1920 in Milan) was an Italian entrepreneur.

== Biography ==
He was the son of Maria Provasoli and Antonio Benigno “Toni Tengitt” Crespi, a descendant of a family of textile entrepreneurs from Busto Arsizio. He was, therefore, the brother of entrepreneur Benigno Crespi. After briefly pursuing classical studies, he graduated in accounting. He finished the seminary without becoming a priest and began law school in Pavia, which, however, he had to leave for economic reasons.

Aided by his father, he converted three different facilities located in three separate municipalities, resulting in the factories of: Vaprio d'Adda (1864), Vigevano (1867) and Ghemme (1869); in the case of the Vaprio mill, he was also helped financially by Ercole Lualdi, but production at this plant was unprofitable due to the American Civil War, which resulted in a consequent “famine” of cotton, thus affecting the European cotton industry. Therefore, towards the end of 1865, Cristoforo Benigno had to relinquish the Vaprio mill to Raimondo Visconti di Modrone in spite of himself. Following hereditary separation on the death of his father (1883), the Vigevano mill passed to his brother Giuseppe and the Ghemme mill to two other brothers (Carlo and Pasquale, the latter in turn separating in 1889 to found his own spinning mill in Verona).

However, the name of the firm was retained in the name of his grandfather, Benigno Crespi. Cristoforo Benigno purchased an additional spinning mill in Baveno, which he later sold to his son Silvio Crespi. Aspiring to set up his own factory, he fell back in February 1877, obtaining permission to use a water derivation from the Adda River, which he intended to use as motive power for an erected spinning mill, between the towns of Capriate San Gervasio and Canonica d'Adda; the following year he founded the factory and a workers' village, which in the complex took the name Crespi d'Adda, introducing the most modern spinning systems of the time.

In 1879, he had a Moorish-style villa dedicated to his wife, Pia Travelli, called Villa Crespi, in Orta San Giulio, to be used as a summer residence, designed by architect Angelo Colla. In 1884, he moved his residence to Milan, to the house at 18 Via Borgonuovo (built by builder/decorator Angelo Colla), where the company was based.

In 1897 a cotton textile industry was created in the province of Milan and the factory and its worker village, called Crespi d'Adda was built on the left bank of the river Adda between the towns of Capriate San Gervasio and Canonica d’Adda where the flow of water provided hydroelectric energy to power the cotton looms. It was in full production until the economic crash of 1929, when the family went bankrupt, but was still producing in limited output up until its closure in 2004. Descendants of the original workers still live in the village. It has been a UNESCO World Heritage Site since 1995.

He was a great art lover and amassed one of the most valued and rich collections of paintings, including paintings by Titian, Canaletto, and Peter Paul Rubens.

His son, Silvio Benigno Crespi, was among the world's most powerful men at the time and signed the Treaty of Versailles at the end of the First World War on behalf of Italy.
