= San Ciro, Capriate San Gervasio =

Church building in Capriate San Gervasio, Italy

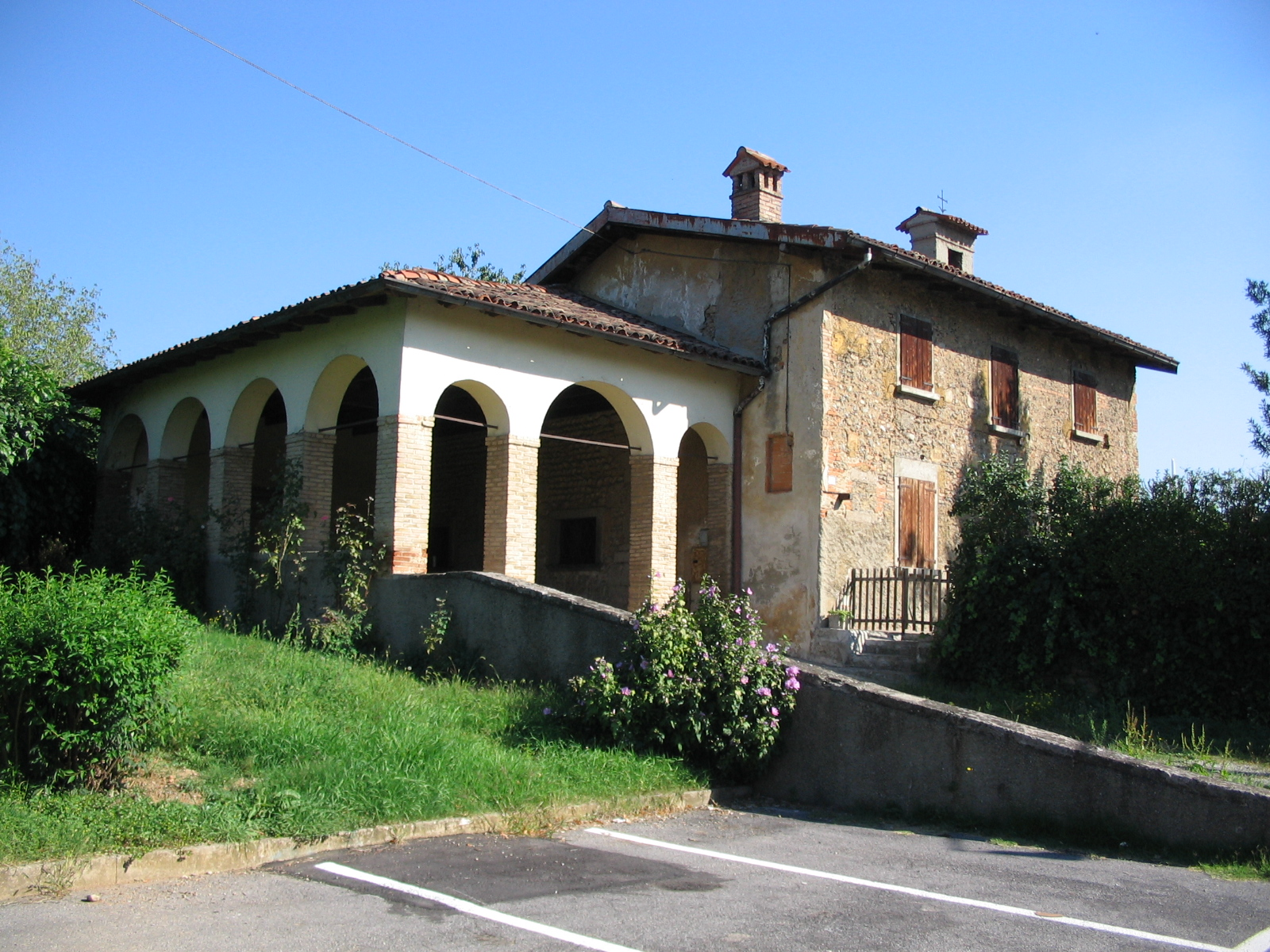
Front portico of church

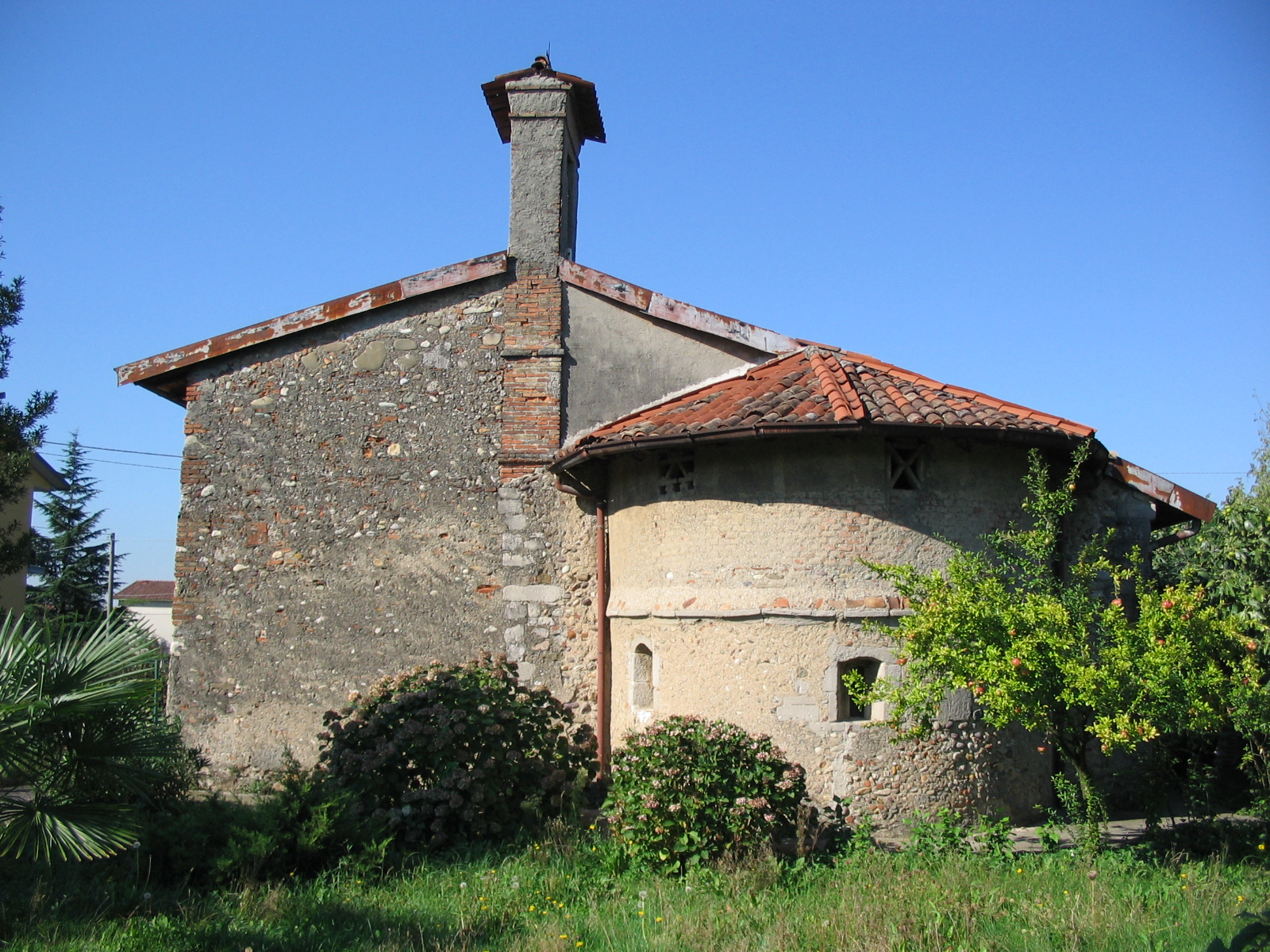
Apse of church

San Ciro is a Romanesque-style, Roman Catholic church located on Via San Siro 18 in the town of Capriate San Gervasio, in the province of Bergamo, Italy. The church was erected in the 12th-century using stone. The small church lacks aisles and has a frescoed apse.
