= Silvio Crespi =

Italian entrepreneur, inventor and politician

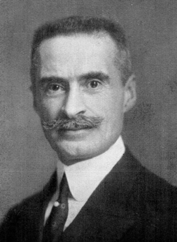
Silvio Crespi

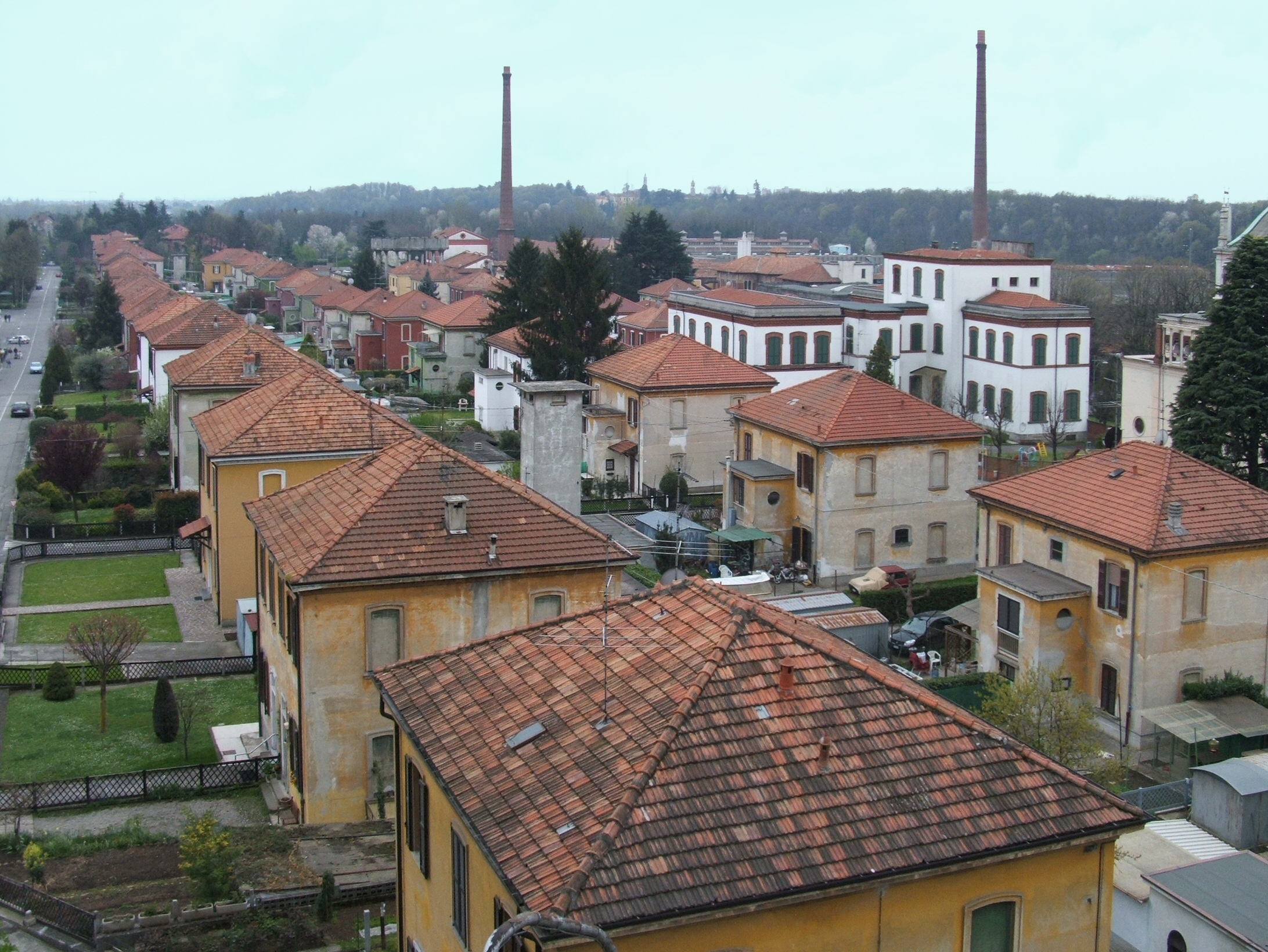
Silvio Crespi played a major role in completing the model village and company town of Crespi d'Adda, today a UNESCO site

Silvio Benigno Crespi (24 September 1868 in Milan – 15 January 1944 in Cadorago) was an Italian entrepreneur, inventor and politician. Firstborn of Cristoforo Benigno Crespi and Pia Travelli. He succeeded his father in running the firm of Crespi d'Adda, today a UNESCO World Heritage Site that is considered notable for being a 19th and 20th century company town which reflected enlightened industrialists' respect for their employees.

He graduated with a law degree at age 21 and went to France, Germany and England to follow the development of the cotton industry. He also worked in Oldham, at Platt Brothers, a famous manufacturer of textile machinery. In 1889 he joined his father's firm Crespi d'Adda where he expanded the village and introduced the construction of homes with gardens.

He was among the world's most powerful men at the time and signed the Treaty of Versailles at the end of the First World War on behalf of Italy.

At the Second World Motor Transport Congress in Roma 25-29 September 1928, Silvio Crespi proposed to use containers for road and railway transport systems as collaboration not as a competition between road and rail systems under auspices of the international organ similar to the Sleeping Car Company for international carriage of passengers in sleeping wagons. He is a forgotten promoter of exploitation the container system in Europe before Second World War.
