= Grezzago =

Grezzago Gresciagh (Lombard)
- Comune
- Comune di Grezzago
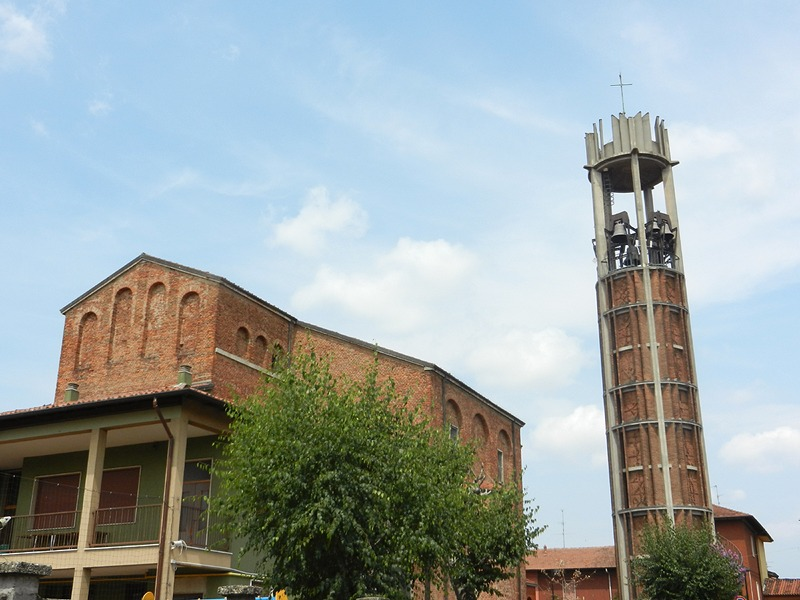
- Church of San Martino

- Location within Italy Location within Lombardy
- Coordinates: 45°35′N 9°29′E
- Country: Italy
- Region: Lombardy
- Metropolitan city: Milan (MI)

Area
  - Total: 2.5 km^{2} (0.97 sq mi)
- Elevation: 178 m (584 ft)

Population (2009)
  - Total: 2,964
  - Density: 1,200/km^{2} (3,100/sq mi)
- Demonym: Grezzaghesi
- Time zone: UTC+1 (CET)
  - Summer (DST): UTC+2 (CEST)
- Postal code: 20056
- Dialing code: 02
- Website: Official website

Grezzago (Lombard: Gresciagh or Gresciaa [ɡreˈʃaː(k)], locally [ɡraˈʃɑːk]) is a comune (municipality) in the Province of Milan in the Italian region Lombardy, located about 30 kilometres (19 mi) northeast of Milan. As of 31 December 2004, it had a population of 2,414 and an area of 2.5 square kilometres (0.97 mi^{2}).

Grezzago borders the following municipalities: Trezzo sull'Adda, Busnago, Trezzano Rosa, Vaprio d'Adda, Pozzo d'Adda.

== Demographic evolution ==
Historical population

Year	Pop.	±%
1861	555	—
1871	628	+13.2%
1881	671	+6.8%
1901	633	−5.7%
1911	792	+25.1%

Year	Pop.	±%
1921	720	−9.1%
1931	801	+11.3%
1936	836	+4.4%
1951	976	+16.7%
1961	1,068	+9.4%

Year	Pop.	±%
1971	1,228	+15.0%
1981	1,297	+5.6%
1991	1,628	+25.5%
2001	2,090	+28.4%

Source: Data from ISTAT
