= Visconti Castle (Trezzo sull'Adda) =

Castle in Trezzo sull'Adda, Lombardy, Northern Italy

- Castello Visconteo di Trezzo sull'Adda
- Trezzo sull'Adda, Lombardy, Northern Italy
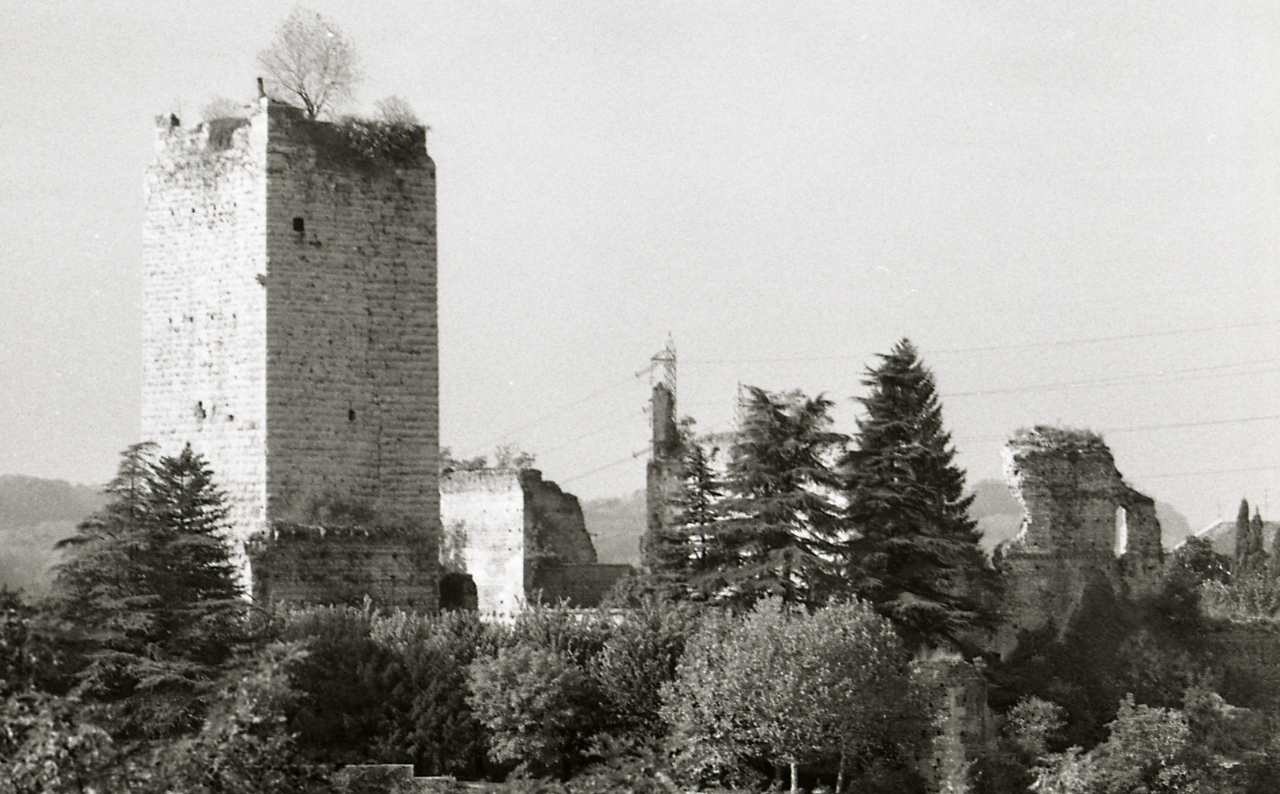
- The tower of the castle in 1980 photo by Paolo Monti

Site information
- Type: Medieval castle
- Owner: Municipality of Trezzo sull'Adda
- Open to the public: Yes
- Condition: Mostly ruined; good the surviving parts (tower and part of the casemates)

Location
- Location within Northern Italy
- Coordinates: 45°36′42″N 9°31′20″E
- Height: 42 m (138 ft) (tower)

Site history
- Built: 1370–1377
- Built by: Bernabò Visconti
- Materials: Stone, cobblestone and bricks
- Events: Imprisonment and death of Bernabò Visconti (1385)

The Visconti Castle of Trezzo was a mediaeval castle built between 1370 and 1377 by Bernabò Visconti, Lord of Milan, at Trezzo sull'Adda, Lombardy, Northern Italy. It included a massive tower, 42-meters high, and a fortified bridge on the Adda river on a single arch with a record 72-meter span.

The bridge was deliberately destroyed in the 15th century during an attack on the castle. In the course of the 18th and 19th centuries, the walls of the castle were partly demolished to obtain construction materials. The stone elements of the collapsed bridge were moved to Milan for the construction of the Napoleonic Arena.

The first initiatives to preserve the remains of the castle were taken in the second half of the 19th century. The surviving parts are today reduced to the tower, the bridge abutments, some walls, and the casemates.

== History ==
=== Origins ===
Since prehistoric times, the castle's site hosted a Celtic settlement and, after the 7th century, was inhabited by Lombard populations. The first fortifications on the hill are attributed to them. Along with the Early Middle Ages and until the 13th century, the buildings were repeatedly transformed.

Towers were built on two points of the peninsula: at the northern end, the Teodolinda Tower, named after the Lombard queen; on the eastern side, the Black Tower (the Torre Nera) traditionally attributed to the Emperor Frederick Barbarossa.

=== The Visconti period (14th-15th centuries) ===
==== Bernabò Visconti ====
At the end of the 13th century, the Visconti family assumed the lordship of Milan. In the following decades, they extended their dominions in northern Italy, incorporating Bergamo and Brescia, east to the Adda river. After 1355, the two brothers Galeazzo II and Bernabò Visconti divided the family territories. Trezzo was part of the eastern portion obtained by Bernabò.

In 1370, Bernabò ordered the construction of a new castle on the Trezzo peninsula, as part of a broader plan to fortify the territories under his rule. The castle extended along the southern portion of the peninsula. On its northern part, the previous fortifications were not altered. The central building had a rectangular plan, elongated from south to north along the peninsula. The tower of the castle, 42-meter high, was erected a few meters south of the central building and connected to it with two walls. The castle, therefore, resulted in having a pentagonal shape. Along the two sides of the castle, parallel to the river's course, casemates were built under the wall, partly excavating the rock.

Bernabò's project included a fortified bridge over the Adda river that connected the castle to the eastern territories under his rule. The bridge had a single arch with a 72-meter span, never achieved before, and was 8-meter wide. Two towers on its ends controlled the passage through the bridge. A second walkway was realized on a lower level inside the bridge.

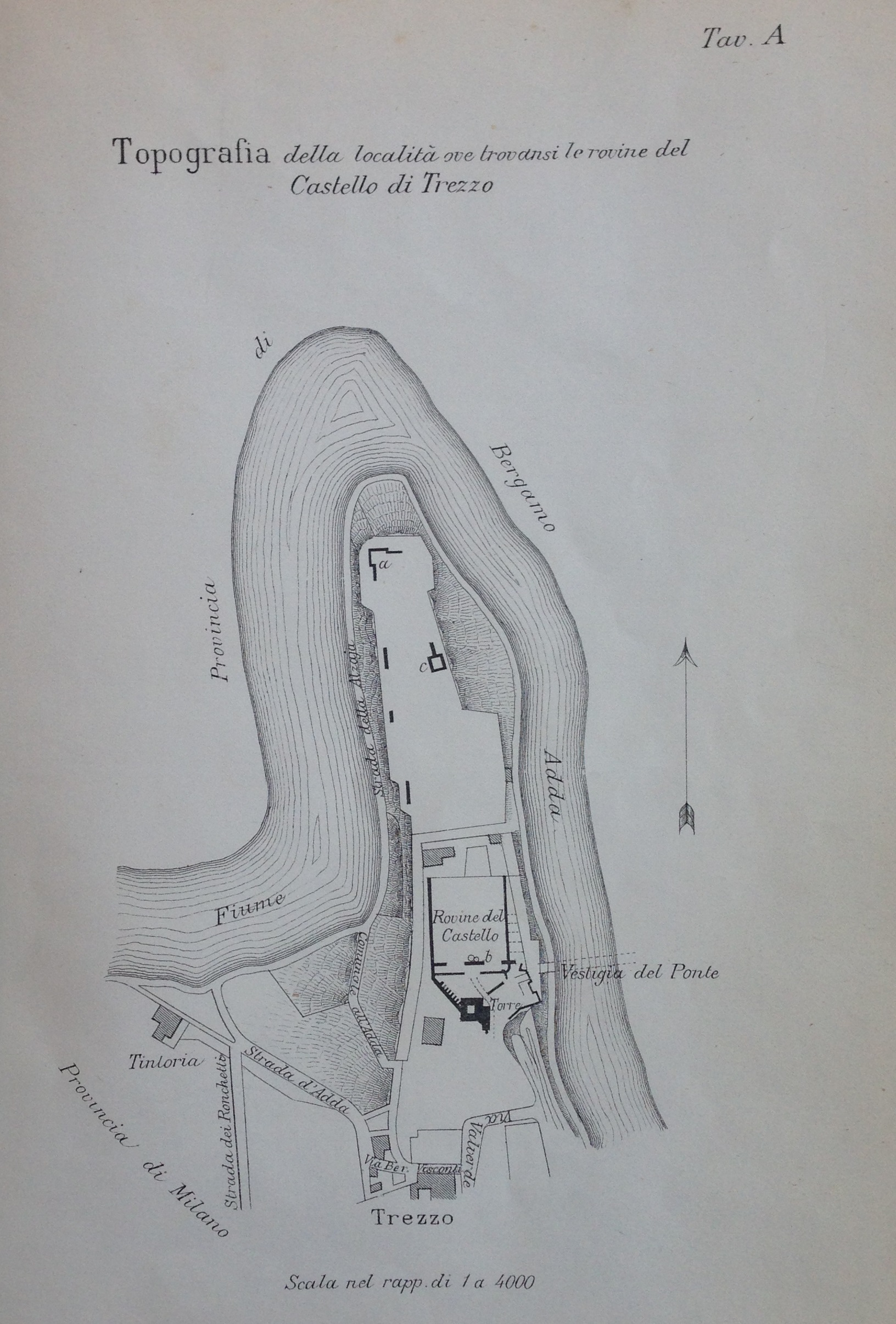
The peninsula formed by the Adda river with the position of the remains of the Early Middle Ages fortifications (a, c) and the Visconti Castle (b)

Both the castle and the bridge were completed in 1377. The construction materials used for the castle were stones and bricks. The masonry primarily consisted of river pebbles interspersed with brick courses. Ashlars were also used, especially in the southern walls and in the tower, where they were rusticated. The bridge was probably constructed entirely with stones.

In 1385, Gian Galeazzo Visconti, son of Galeazzo II, staged a coup against his uncle Bernabò, arrested him, and took control of all the Visconti territories. Gian Galeazzo chose the Trezzo castle as the place of imprisonment for Bernabò. A few months later, Bernabò died in his cell, supposedly after having been poisoned.

==== Crisis of the Visconti state and bridge demolition ====
The death of Gian Galeazzo Visconti in 1402 opened a period of crisis in the Visconti state, which led to a fragmentation of its territorial unity. Paolo Colleoni, the father of Bartolomeo and member of a family from Bergamo longtime opposer of the Visconti, occupied the Trezzo castle. In 1416 Filippo Maria Visconti, son and successor of Gian Galeazzo, instructed the condottiero Francesco Bussone da Carmagnola to retake Trezzo. Carmagnola attacked and besieged the castle from the west. After having tried in vain to stop the supply to the castle, coming from east through the bridge, he decided to undercut one of the arch abutments, causing the bridge to collapse.

=== Decay and reuse of the construction materials (16th-19th centuries) ===
In the following centuries, the castle had no significant alterations. After the unification of the territories of Milan and Venice, laid down in the Treaty of Campo Formio in 1797, the Adda river no longer marked their border. The castle lost, therefore, its importance.

In the 19th century, when puddingstone quarries were opened near the shore of the Adds river, the older Torre Nera was destroyed. At the same time, the walls of the castle began to be dismantled to obtain construction materials. Decorative elements were transferred to the Royal Villa of Monza. Being Trezzo in the proximity of the inlet of the Martesana Canal, the blocks of the collapsed bridge were easily moved to Milan, where they were used in the construction of the Napoleonic Arena Civica.

=== Preservation and restoration of the remains (19th-21st centuries) ===
At the beginning of the 20th century, a large hydroelectric power plant (Taccani power plant) was built at the foot of the Trezzo hill. Its architecture was designed considering the proximity of the castle.

Restoration of the ruins began at the end of the 20th, when the local municipality acquired the castle.

== Today ==
The restored ruins of the castle, the Taccani hydroelectric power plant, and the Adda river's natural environment characterize today the Trezzo area.

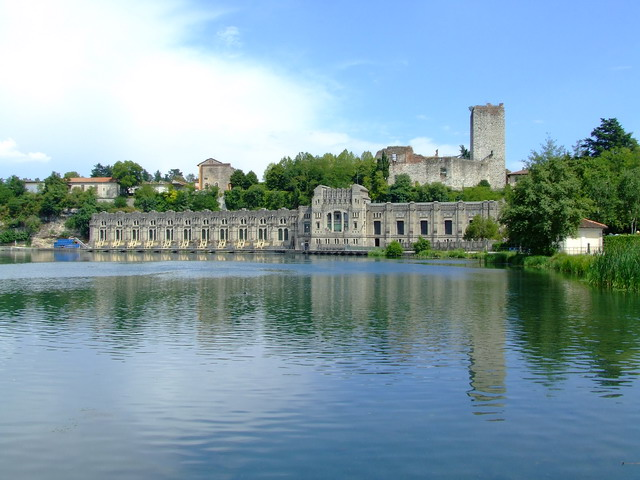
The tower and the ruins of the castle from west (in the foreground the Taccani hydroelectric power plant)

The remains of the castle are open for tourist visits. The tower can be visited up to its top. The casemates on the eastern side of the castle are also accessible. The older Teodolinda tower is visible from the river bank at the extreme north of the peninsula.

== Sources ==
- Black, Jane (2009). Absolutism in Renaissance Milan. Plenitude of power under the Visconti and the Sforza 1329–1535. Oxford: Oxford University Press. ISBN 9780199565290.
- Conti, Flavio; Hybsch, Vincenzo; Vincenti, Antonello (1990). I castelli della Lombardia. Provincie di Milano e Pavia (in Italian). Novara: Istituto Geografico de Agostini. ISBN 88-402-9108-3.
- Crivelli, Ariberto (1886). Gli avanzi del castello di Trezzo – L'antico ed il nuovo ponte sull'Adda (in Italian). Milan: Prem. Tipo-Litografia degli Ingegneri.
