= Villa Castelbarco, Vaprio d'Adda =

Building in Vaprio d'Adda, Italy

Coordinates: 45.58669°N 9.5323°E

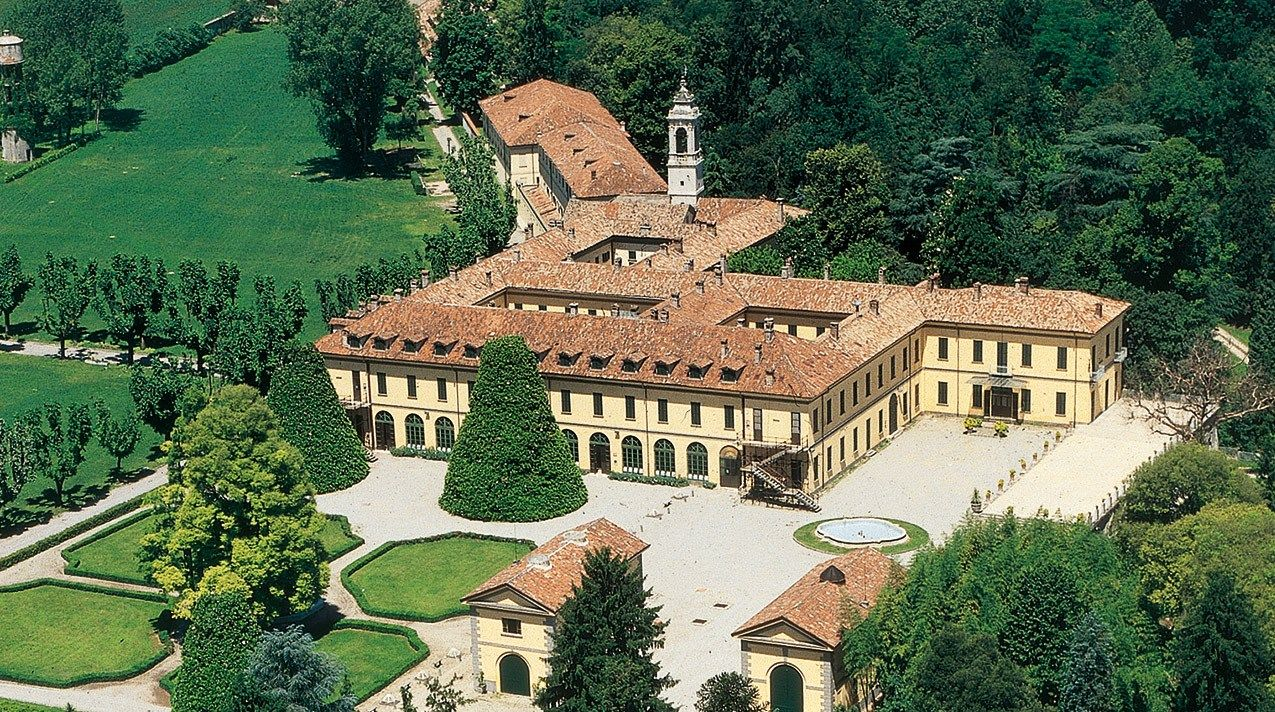
esterno della villa

Villa Castelbarco is a rural palace described as a villa di delizia which translates as villa of delights, located just west of the Martesana canal and Adda river, just north of the town of Vaprio d'Adda, in the region of Lombardy, Italy.

== History ==
Originally, the site hosted a Vallombrosan monastery, with sustaining farms and a chapel to St Carpoforo. The general layout seems to reflect the cloisters of the former monastery. In a 19th-century description, it was called Villa Monasterolo.

These were repurposed by Count Giuseppe Simonetta (died 1733) with construction of a lodge. The monastic church was formulated as a family chapel, refurbished in Baroque style with a polychrome marble altar. The villa was transferred from the Simonetta to the Castelbarco family by the late 18th century, when Francesca Simonetta married Count Cesare Castelbarco. This count pursued renovation of the buildings and surrounding area, which had been used as a hunting lodge in the past.

In 1804, he expanded and decorated reception rooms, doubled the size of the south wing with the construction of a limonaia or orangery. On the esplanade next to the terrace, he built two Empire-style palazzini used as museum and theater. The park with enhanced with benches and statuary.

Between 1835 and 1837, Cesare's nephew, Carlo Castelbarco created in the basement a series of rooms with individual themes: Egyptian, Etruscan, Roman, Oceanic, and finely a room with a Renaissance or Raphaelesque theme. The rooms, often cave-like, were furnished with fountains with playful water jets and waterfalls. A guide from 1907 depicts in situ a Northern Italian sculpture collected by Carlo, now in the Cloisters collection of the Metropolitan Museum of Art in New York.

At the end of the nineteenth century, the villa passed to the Massimini family, then the Quintavalle in the early twentieth century, which occupied it until the mid-1960s. Currently the property is owned by a private company called "Barco art and culture center". It is used for cultural events and private functions.
