= Trezzo sull'Adda =

- Comune
- Città di Trezzo sull'Adda
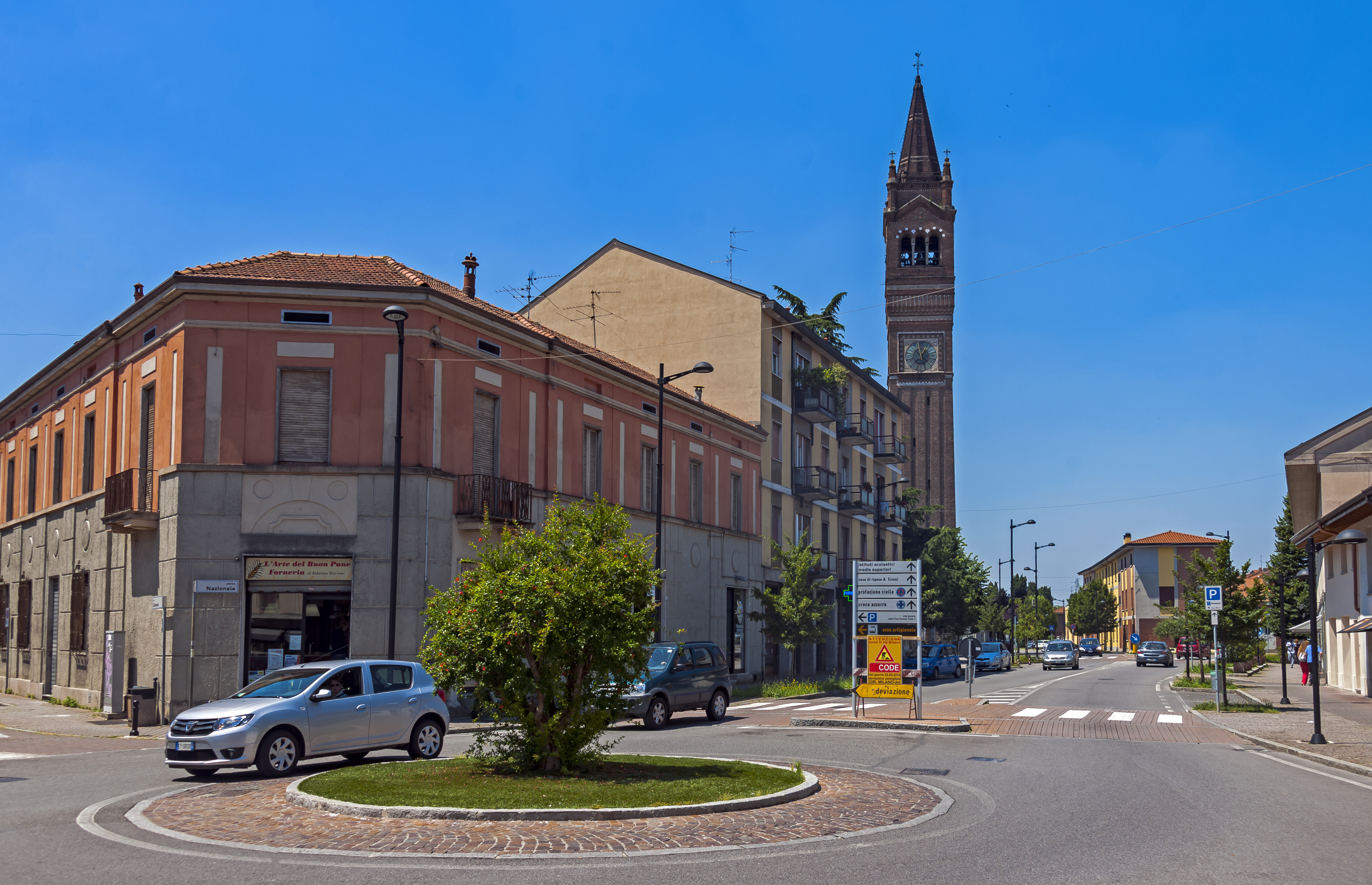
- Piazza Nazionale and Chiesa Santi Gervasio e Protasio

- Coat of arms

- Location within Italy Location within Lombardy
- Coordinates: 45°36′N 9°31′E
- Country: Italy
- Region: Lombardy
- Metropolitan city: Milan (MI)
- Frazioni: Cascina Figini, Concesa

Government
  - Mayor: Diego Torri

Area
  - Total: 13.05 km^{2} (5.04 sq mi)
- Elevation: 187 m (614 ft)

Population (31 December 2020)
  - Total: 11,858
  - Density: 908.7/km^{2} (2,353/sq mi)
- Demonym: Trezzesi
- Time zone: UTC+1 (CET)
  - Summer (DST): UTC+2 (CEST)
- Postal code: 20056
- Dialing code: 02
- Patron saint: Saint Cajetan
- Saint day: August 7
- Website: Official website

Trezzo sull'Adda (Milanese: Trezz [ˈtrɛts]) is a comune (municipality) in the Metropolitan City of Milan in the Italian region Lombardy, located about 30 kilometres (19 mi) northeast of Milan on the Adda River.

The Naviglio Martesana canal starts from the Adda in Trezzo's territory.

Trezzo sull'Adda borders the following municipalities: Cornate d'Adda, Bottanuco, Capriate San Gervasio, Busnago, Grezzago, Vaprio d'Adda.

Trezzo received the honorary title of city with a presidential decree on 8 July 2008.

== Main sights ==
Trezzo's main attraction is the massive castle which belonged to the Visconti family in the 14th century. Protected by the Adda on two sides, it had a 42-metre (138 ft) high square tower on the third one. Its fortified bridge (see Trezzo sull'Adda Bridge) was 72 metres (236 ft) long, the longest bridge span for several centuries, built on three different levels, passing 25 metres (82 ft) over the waters.

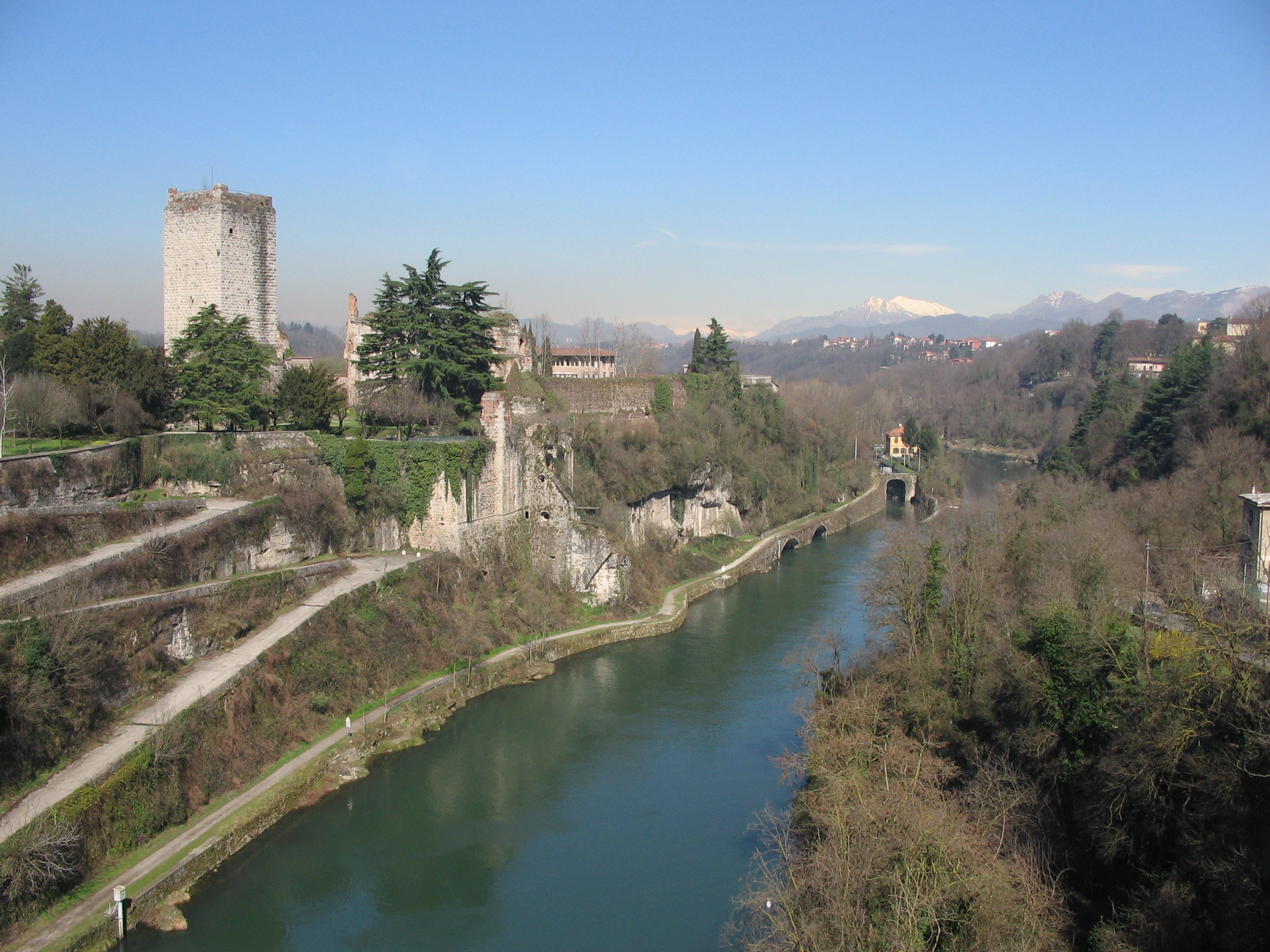
The Visconti Castle in Trezzo.

Due to its strategic position, the castle was contested first by Emperor Frederick Barbarossa and Milan, in the 12th century, and later by the Visconti and the Torriani families. The castle was destroyed or burnt several times, but was rebuilt on each occasion. The last reconstruction dates from 1370. It was commissioned by Bernabò Visconti, who was later imprisoned there until his death.

On 23 October 1404, the castle was captured by Paolo Colleoni, father of the important condottiere Bartolomeo. The Visconti general Francesco Bussone recaptured it, partially demolishing it and starting its decline. In the 19th century it was used as a quarry for the construction of the Arena di Milano.

In the frazione of Concesa is the Sanctuary of the Divine Maternity of Mary, built by Cardinal Cesare Monti from 1641.

Another attraction is Villa Gina, a 17th-century villa built on the Adda with fine terraced gardens. Today it is the seat of the Adda Nord Regional Park.

== Churches and Monasteries ==
In Trezzo Sull'adda, beyond the St. Gervaso and Protaso's Provost church, that was built in 1362 but with clear references to the Romanesque style; there are other important places of prayers. In effect there are:

-Cappella dei morti delle cave (The chapel of the Death in the Quarries ) It is considered a consecrated building for locals. During the terrible epidemic of 1629, this place was adapted as a lazaretto to shelter the sick and to bury those who did not recover. This building, now in precarious condition, has a quadrangular chamber, added in 18th century to the smaller and lower original chapel, along with the altar. On the simple façade it is possible to notice some parts of an eighteenth-century fresco representing the death in an allegory of vanitas of worldly goods.

-Abbazia di San Benedetto ( Saint Benedict's abbey ) This place wasn't an enormous convent, but it was only a simple and pretty abbey. Even long centuries of neglect and dereliction did not destroy the original features of this ancient monastic buildings. In fact, it is possible to see them even though rustic buildings were added to the boundary wall and in the interior of the large garden at different times. The chapel of the ancient Benedict's abbey is a nearly quadrangular chamber with two lateral wings like transeat. The romantic relief over the small door is very important.

-Chiesa di San Rocco ( Saint Rocco's Church ) Compared to other churches in Trezzo, that of Saint Rocco overcame all the storms of history, including the urban reshuffle that recently took place around it. Its origin isn't sure and seems is very ancient, its history is very confused. It was founded in 1285. This small church had a lot of transformations due to its various functions: one example is the hospitality of the naked parishioners who died far from the town, who stop waiting the funeral rite in the parish church. It is a small religious building with only one naves.

== The power-station Taccani ==
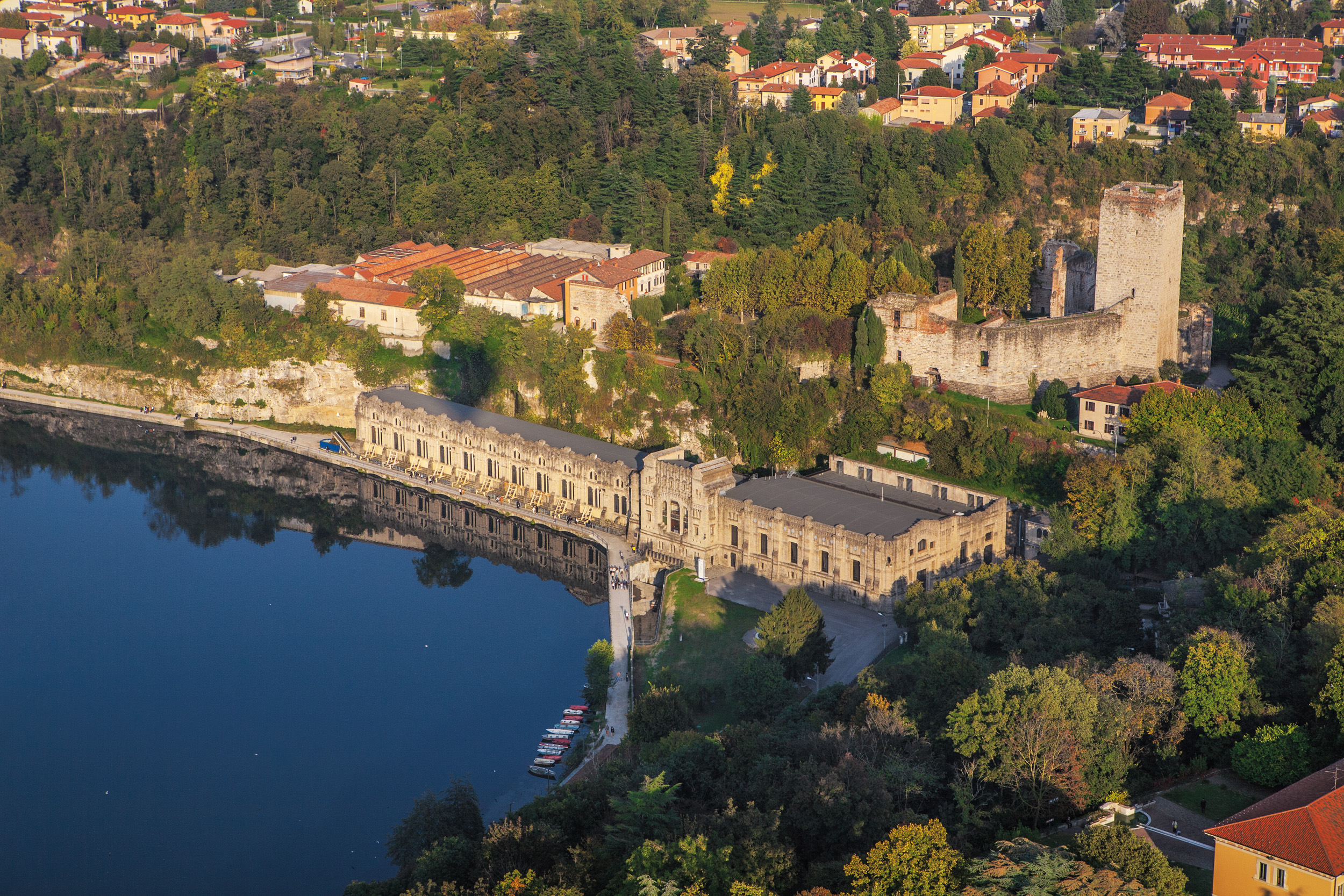
Power-Station Taccani (centrale Taccani)

The new hydro-electric power station in Trezzo, built in order of Cristoforo Benigno Crespi, owner of the textile factory in Crespi d'Adda, had to become a part of the existing landscape without generating audacious contrasts. For this reason the architect Gaetano Moretti and the engineer Adolfo Covi realized a unique building of its kind which combined technological innovations with a redefined decorative language rich in references to modern style and eclectic architecture. This research itself of the "fine aspect", demonstrate that Taccani Power Station is one of the best efforts combining engineering and architecture, art and technique. It was inaugurated in 1906. Unlike other similar plants, the power station in Trezzo has absolutely specific aspects, for instance the lack of the penstock.

== Twin towns ==
Trezzo sull'Adda is twinned with:

- Cevo, Italy
