= Canonica d'Adda =

- Comune
- Comune di Canonica d'Adda
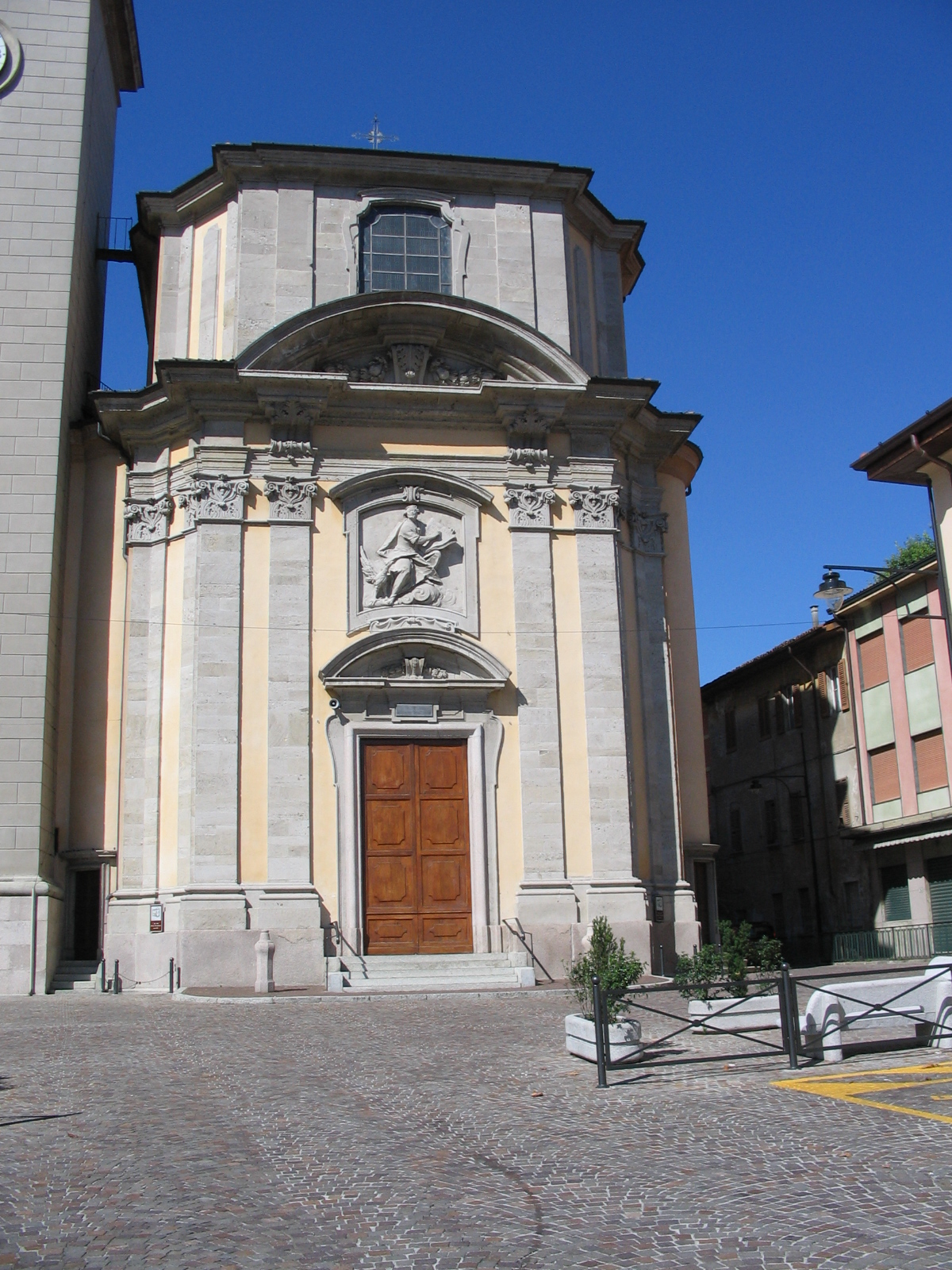
- Parish church.

- Coat of arms

- Location within Italy Location within Lombardy
- Coordinates: 45°35′N 9°32′E
- Country: Italy
- Region: Lombardy
- Province: Bergamo (BG)

Government
  - Mayor: Gianmaria Cerea

Area
  - Total: 3.21 km^{2} (1.24 sq mi)
- Elevation: 99 m (325 ft)

Population (31 May 2021)
  - Total: 4,169
  - Density: 1,300/km^{2} (3,360/sq mi)
- Time zone: UTC+1 (CET)
  - Summer (DST): UTC+2 (CEST)
- Postal code: 24040
- Dialing code: 02
- Patron saint: Santa Maria Assunta
- Saint day: August 15
- Website: Official website

Canonica d'Adda (Bergamasque: Calònega; Milanese: Canòniga) is a comune (municipality) in the Province of Bergamo in the Italian region of Lombardy, located about 30 kilometres (19 mi) northeast of Milan and about 15 kilometres (9 mi) southwest of Bergamo.

It lies on the left bank of the river Adda which separates it from Vaprio d'Adda and is here the boundary between the Province of Bergamo and the Province of Milan. Canonica d'Adda also borders the municipalities of Brembate, Capriate San Gervasio, Fara Gera d'Adda and Pontirolo Nuovo.
