= Vaprio d'Adda =

- Comune
- Comune di Vaprio d'Adda
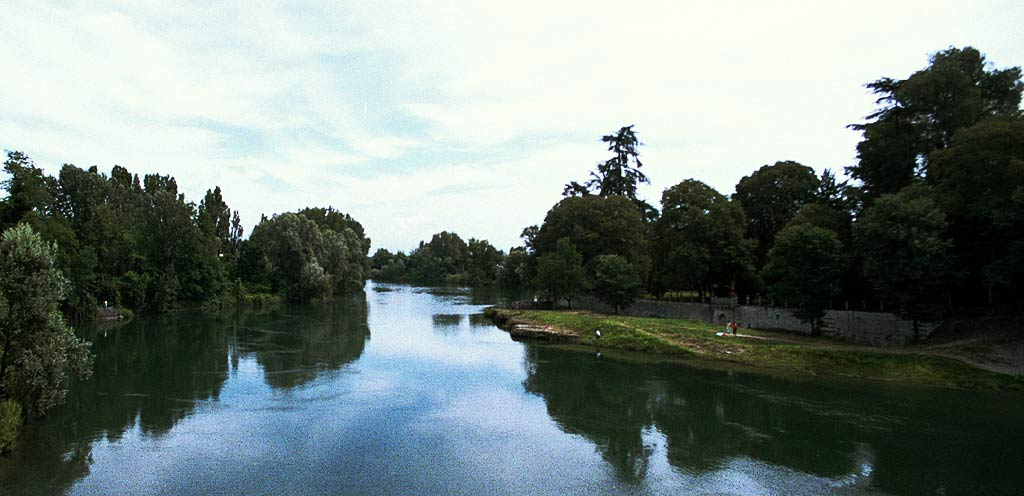
- The river Adda from Vaprio d’Adda.

- Coat of arms

- Location within Italy Location within Lombardy
- Coordinates: 45°35′N 9°32′E
- Country: Italy
- Region: Lombardy
- Metropolitan city: Milan (MI)

Government
  - Mayor: Marco Galli (since June 2024)

Area
  - Total: 7.15 km^{2} (2.76 sq mi)
- Elevation: 161 m (528 ft)

Population (28 February 2022)
  - Total: 9,428
  - Density: 1,320/km^{2} (3,420/sq mi)
- Demonym: Vapriesi
- Time zone: UTC+1 (CET)
  - Summer (DST): UTC+2 (CEST)
- Postal code: 20069
- Dialing code: 02
- Patron saint: Saints Peter and Paul
- Saint day: June 29
- Website: Official website

Vaprio d'Adda (Milanese: Vaver; Bergamasque: Aer; locally Vavar) is a comune (municipality) in the Metropolitan City of Milan in the Italian region Lombardy, about 30 kilometres (19 mi) northeast of Milan.

Vaprio d'Adda borders the following municipalities: Trezzo sull'Adda, Capriate San Gervasio, Grezzago, Canonica d'Adda, Pozzo d'Adda, Cassano d'Adda, Fara Gera d'Adda.

== History ==
In 1799, Austrian and Russian troops under the guidance of Russian Field Marshal Suvorov inflicted a serious defeat on French forces here at the Battle of Cassano. It was during the Great French War.

== Main sights ==
- San Bernardino, ruins of Romanesque church
- San Colombano; 12th-century Romanesque church
- Villa Melzi, where Leonardo da Vinci resided for a while when studying channelling of waters in the Milanese area. It includes a fresco of Madonna with Child attributed to him or his school.
- Villa Castelbarco: private 18th century villa and gardens
