= Capriate San Gervasio =

- Comune
- Comune di Capriate San Gervasio
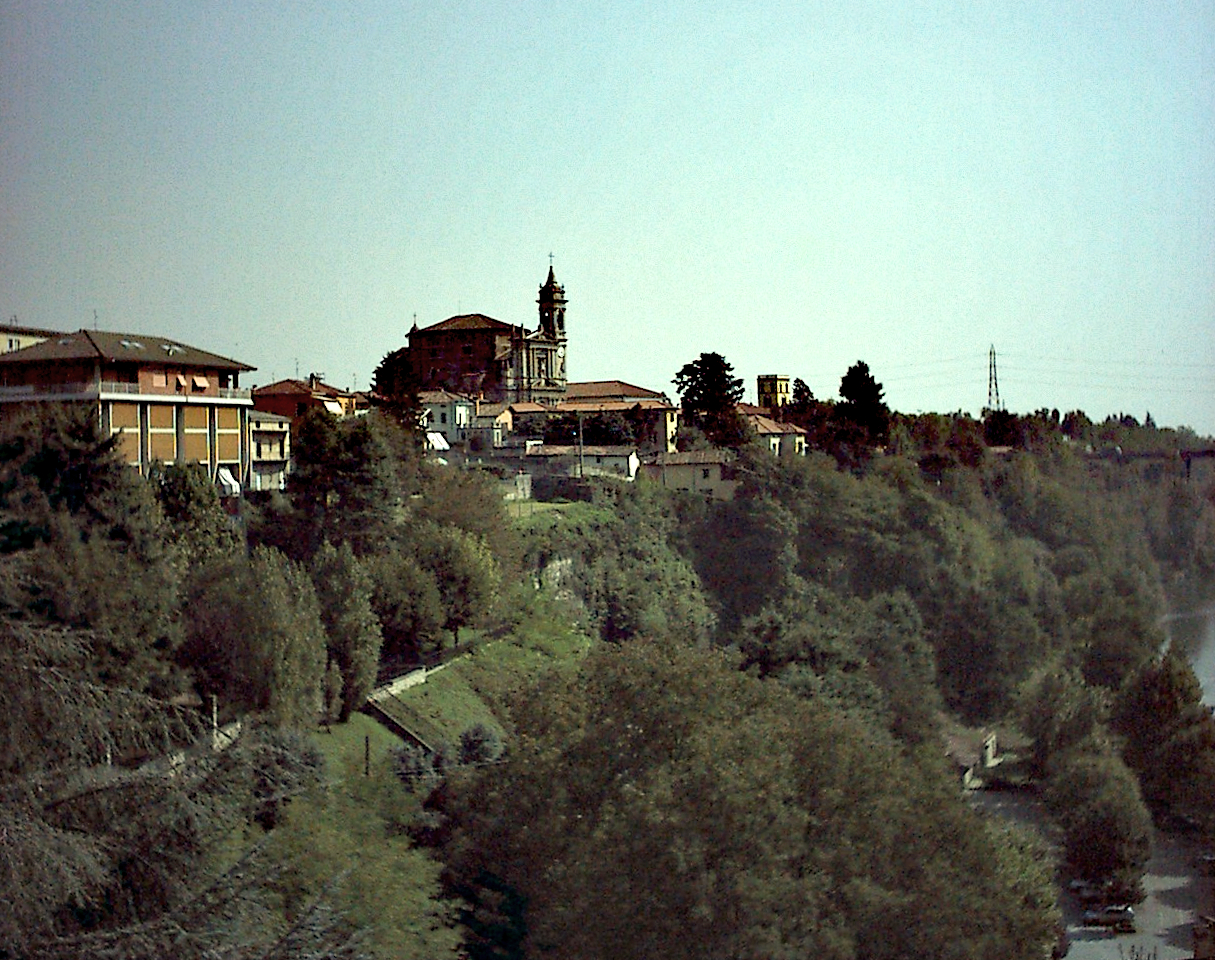

- Coat of arms

- Capriate San Gervasio within the Province of Bergamo

- Location within Italy Location within Lombardy
- Coordinates: 45°36′32″N 09°31′41″E
- Country: Italy
- Region: Lombardy
- Province: Bergamo (BG)
- Frazioni: Capriate, Crespi d'Adda, San Gervasio

Government
  - Mayor: Vittorino Verdi

Area
  - Total: 5.83 km^{2} (2.25 sq mi)
- Elevation: 188 m (617 ft)

Population (2019)
  - Total: 8,216
  - Density: 1,410/km^{2} (3,650/sq mi)
- Demonym: Capriatesi
- Time zone: UTC+1 (CET)
  - Summer (DST): UTC+2 (CEST)
- Postal code: 24040, 24042
- Dialing code: 02
- Patron saint: St. Alexander
- Saint day: August 26
- Website: Official website

Capriate San Gervasio (Bergamasque: Cavriàt San Gervàs; Milanese: Capriàa San Gervàsi) is a town and comune in the province of Bergamo, in Lombardy, northern Italy. As of 2019, its population was 8,216.

The municipality is located about 17 km (11 mi) from Milan.

== History ==
About two thousand years ago, the Romans founded settlements in the area, together with the previous Celtic ones.

The first document attesting the existence of the village dates back to 948; the land had been exploited by the Bishop of Cremona, who had received the feudal investiture from the Emperor of the Holy Roman Empire.

During the following centuries the city witnessed a number of conflicts between the opposing factions of Guelphs and Ghibellines. The situation induced the construction of buildings useful for defense, such as a castle. Also, towards the end of the 12th century, the troops of Bergamo built a huge fortification used as a weapons deposit.

The village was involved in punitive expeditions led by Facino Cane and Francesco Bussone, culminating with the destruction of the bridge over the Adda.

Numerous battles affected the population, who were also subjected to the battles between the troops of Milan and the troops of Venice. The troops of Milan were led by the Sforza-Visconti family and they initially prevailed.

The Venetian recaptured the control of the area in the XV century, ensuring political stability for many years.

In 1797, French rule began with the Cisalpine Republic, and afterwards the Austrians came and constituted the Kingdom of Lombardy–Venetia.

In 1899 in the municipality of Capriate d'Adda, joined Crespi that since that moment had been part of the municipality of Canonica d'Adda.

Only in 1928 did the municipality take its current form when the municipalities of Capriate d'Adda, San Gervasio d'Adda and Crespi became the new municipality of Capriate San Gervasio as it is today.

It received the honorary title of city (città) by a presidential decree on July 11, 2006.

== Geography ==
It is situated on the southern tip of the so-called Bergamasca Island, a territory delimited by the rivers Adda and Brembo. It includes three hamlets (frazioni) at slightly different altitudes: San Gervasio d'Adda (north), Capriate d'Adda (center) and Crespi d'Adda. The latter, a perfectly preserved example of a 19th-century "workers' village", is a UNESCO World Heritage Site.

The municipality borders Bottanuco, Brembate, Canonica d'Adda, Filago, Trezzo sull'Adda (MI) and Vaprio d'Adda (MI).

The municipality's territory has a linear shape; it is located along the left bank of the river Adda, where the river turns into a characteristic double handle that creates a natural environment rich in vegetation.

It has a particular structure: from north to south it is composed of three different "steps"; each one has a historical urban settlement: the first is San Gervasio d'Adda (north), the second Capriate d'Adda (middle), and the last Crespi d'Adda (south).

== Monuments and places of interest ==
=== Religious architecture ===
The parish church dedicated to Saint Alexander was built in the early 20th century on the site of an older, smaller church. The new building has preserved the altar, the Stations of the Cross, and a number of frescos. Other notable churches in the municipality include the church dedicated to Saint Gervasio and Protasio, Crespi d'adda Church, the oratory dedicated to Saint Rocco and that of Saint Siro and Saint Sigoldo.

=== Civil architecture ===
The town has many important civil buildings, such as Villa Valsecchi, the headquarters of a religious order, the town hall building, and the bridge over the river Adda.

=== Minitalia Leolandia ===
A theme park, Minitalia Leolandia, is located in Capriate San Gervasio. Among its main attractions are rides, a reptilian and a miniature version of Italy.

=== Village of Crespi ===
The most important tourist attraction is the village of Crespi d'Adda. It has been a UNESCO World Heritage Site since 1995. The village of Crespi is, according to UNESCO, the fifth best site in the world linked to the history of industry.

== Infrastructure and transport ==
The A4 motorway has a dedicated exit in Capriate San Gervasio.

A station for the Monza–Trezzo–Bergamo tramway was located in the town between 1890 and 1958.

== Administration ==
The mayor is Vittorino Verdi, elected in 2018.
