= Beghe =

Beghe (or Beghè) is a surname. Notable people with this surname include:

- Bruno Beghé, American artist, author of the Joseph Ward marble sculpture
- Davide Beghè (1854–1933), Italian painter, mainly depicting sacred subjects and portraits
- Jason Beghe (born 1960), American film and television actor
- Renato Beghe (1933–2012), American Judge of the United States Tax Court
- Stéphanie Mugneret-Béghé (born 1974), French former football midfielder
