= Sant' Ambrogio e Simpliciano =

Church in Italy

Coordinates: 45°40′36″N 9°14′15″E

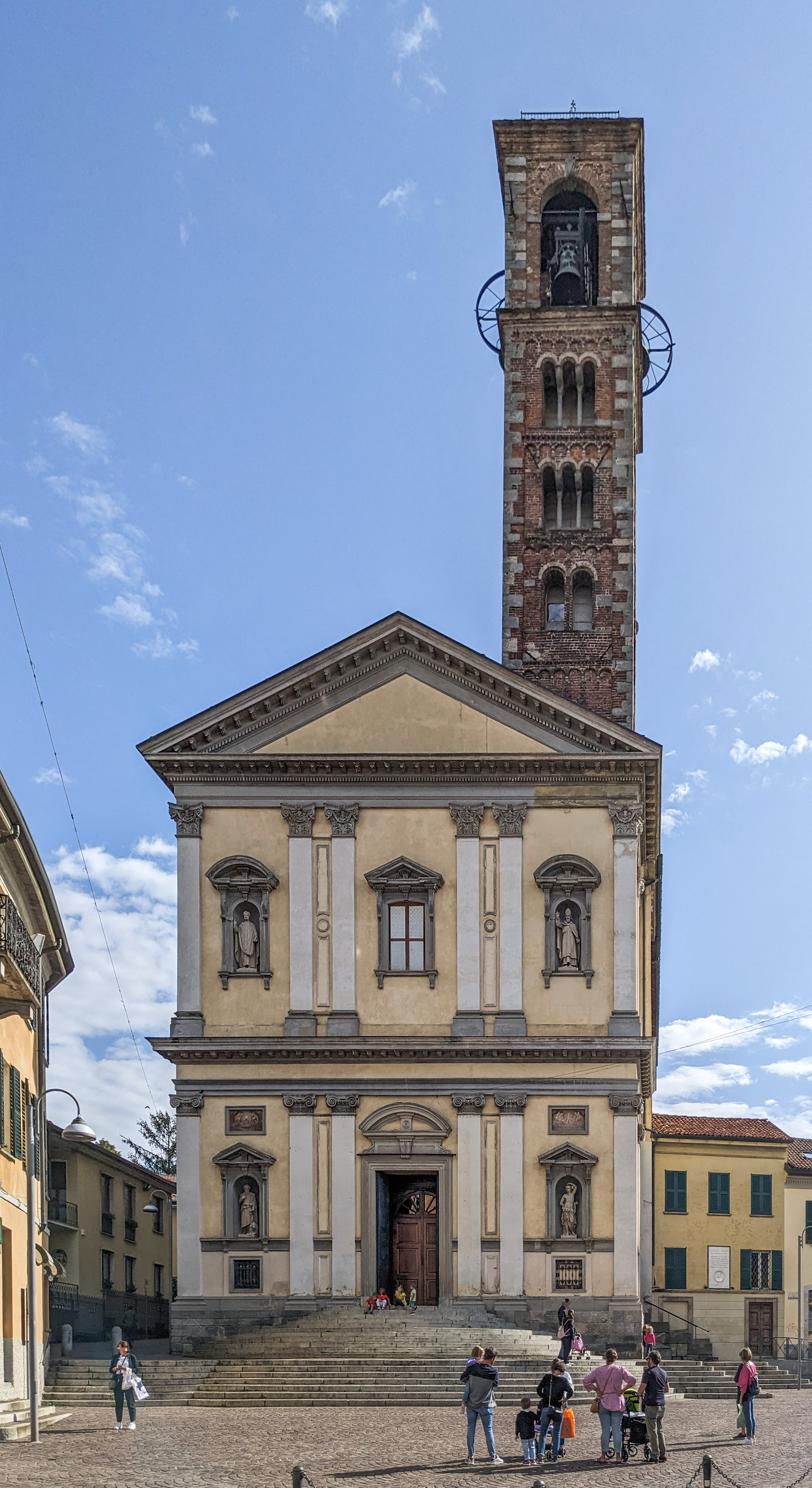
Santi Ambrogio e Simpliciano

Santi Ambrogio e Simpliciano is a Roman Catholic provost church in Carate Brianza, province of Monza and Brianza, region of Lombardy, Italy.

== History ==
Originally, this site housed a medieval Romanesque-style church facing east, the present church was rebuilt during the 18th and 19th centuries in a Neoclassical style. The bell-tower however retains its Romanesque elements. The present façade (1889s) is preceded by a scenic staircase, completed in 1830. The sober yet elegant interiors were designed by Simone Cantoni. The nave frescoes (1899) were painted by Davide Beghè.
