= Carate Brianza =

Carate Brianza Caraa
- Comune
- Comune di Carate Brianza
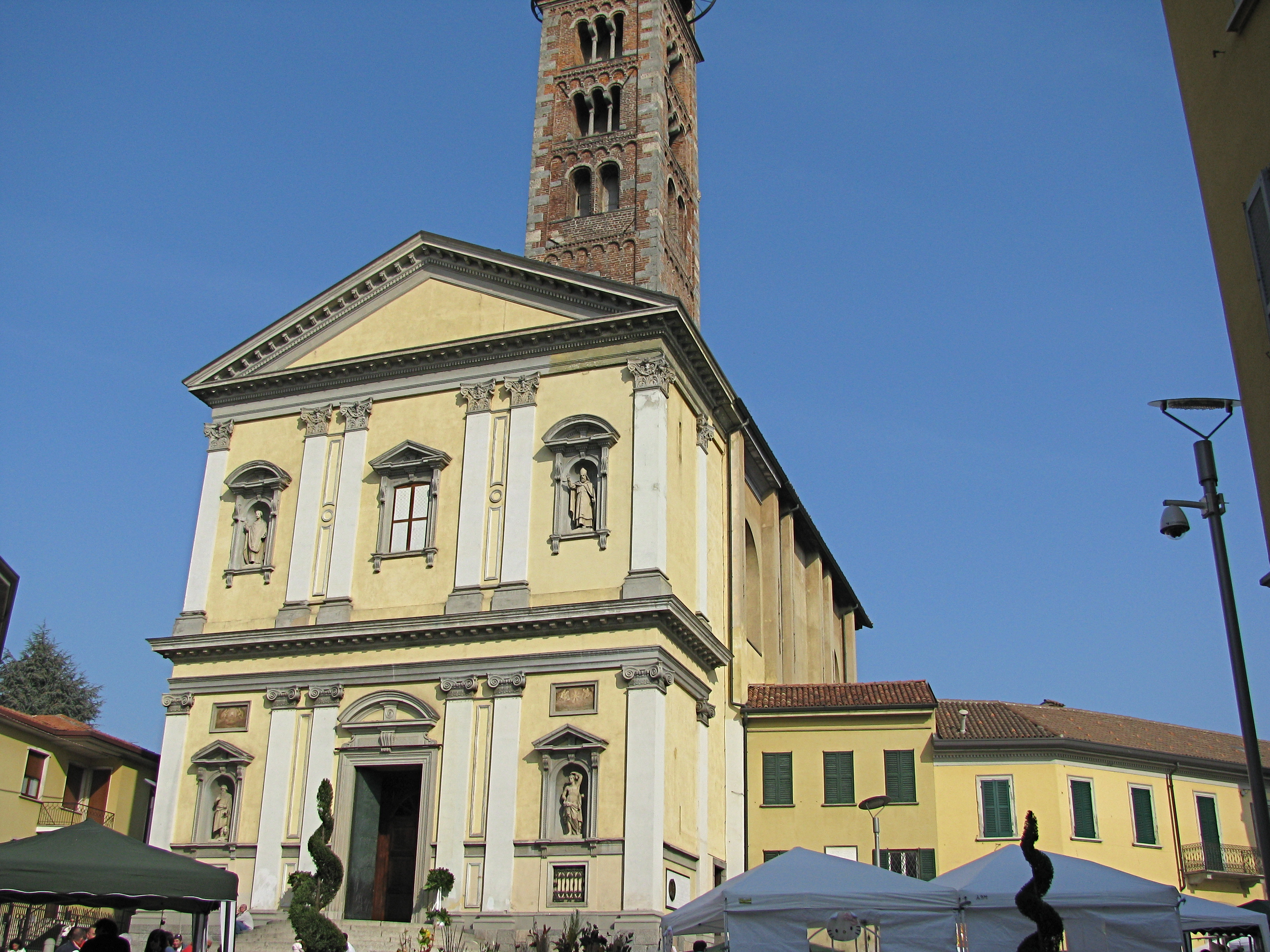
- Prepository church

- Coat of arms

- Location within Italy Location within Lombardy
- Coordinates: 45°41′N 9°14′E
- Country: Italy
- Region: Lombardy
- Province: Monza and Brianza (MB)

Government
  - Mayor: Luca Veggian

Area
  - Total: 9.92 km^{2} (3.83 sq mi)
- Elevation: 256 m (840 ft)

Population (30 November 2017)
  - Total: 17,949
  - Density: 1,810/km^{2} (4,690/sq mi)
- Demonym: Caratesi
- Time zone: UTC+1 (CET)
  - Summer (DST): UTC+2 (CEST)
- Postal code: 20841
- Dialing code: 0362
- Patron saint: Saint Ambrose
- Saint day: 7 December
- Website: Official website

Carate Brianza (Lombard: Caraa) is a comune in the province of Monza and Brianza, in the Italian region of Lombardy. The city lies at an elevation ranging from 230 to 300 metres (750 to 980 ft) above sea level, on the Lambro river.

== History ==
The history of Carate Brianza dates back to the Stone Age, as shown by a discovery made of carved rocks that are now preserved in the Archaeological Museum of Milan.

The Lombard Queen Theodolinda built in this town a tower, which later was turned into the bell tower for the main church. After the 10th century, a wall was built around the town to protect it from barbarian attacks. The Middle Ages was characterized by the spreading of Christianity, with the construction of five churches and a hospital.

During the 19th century jurist and philosopher Gian Domenico Romagnosi lived in Carate.

== Main sights ==
- Villa Cusani Confalonieri – originally the site of a medieval castle; the present shape was acquired over the 18th and 19th century. It now houses the town library and scenic park, open to the public.
- Villa La Rovella – Neoclassical villa and oratory in the frazione of Agliate
- Sant'Ambrogio e Simpliciano – 19th-century parish church in town center, near the 18th-century statue of Sant'Anatalone, which has been restored recently
- San Pietro and San Paolo, Agliate – Basilica built in Romanesque style
- Oratorio di Santa Maria Maddalena, Carate Brianza – small 15th-century church adjacent to Villa Cusani Confalonieri

== See also ==
- Brianza
- Simone Cantoni
- Lambro
- Gian Domenico Romagnosi
