= Santi Pietro e Paolo, Agliate =

Church in Lombardy, Italy

Coordinates: 45.6862°N 9.2394°E

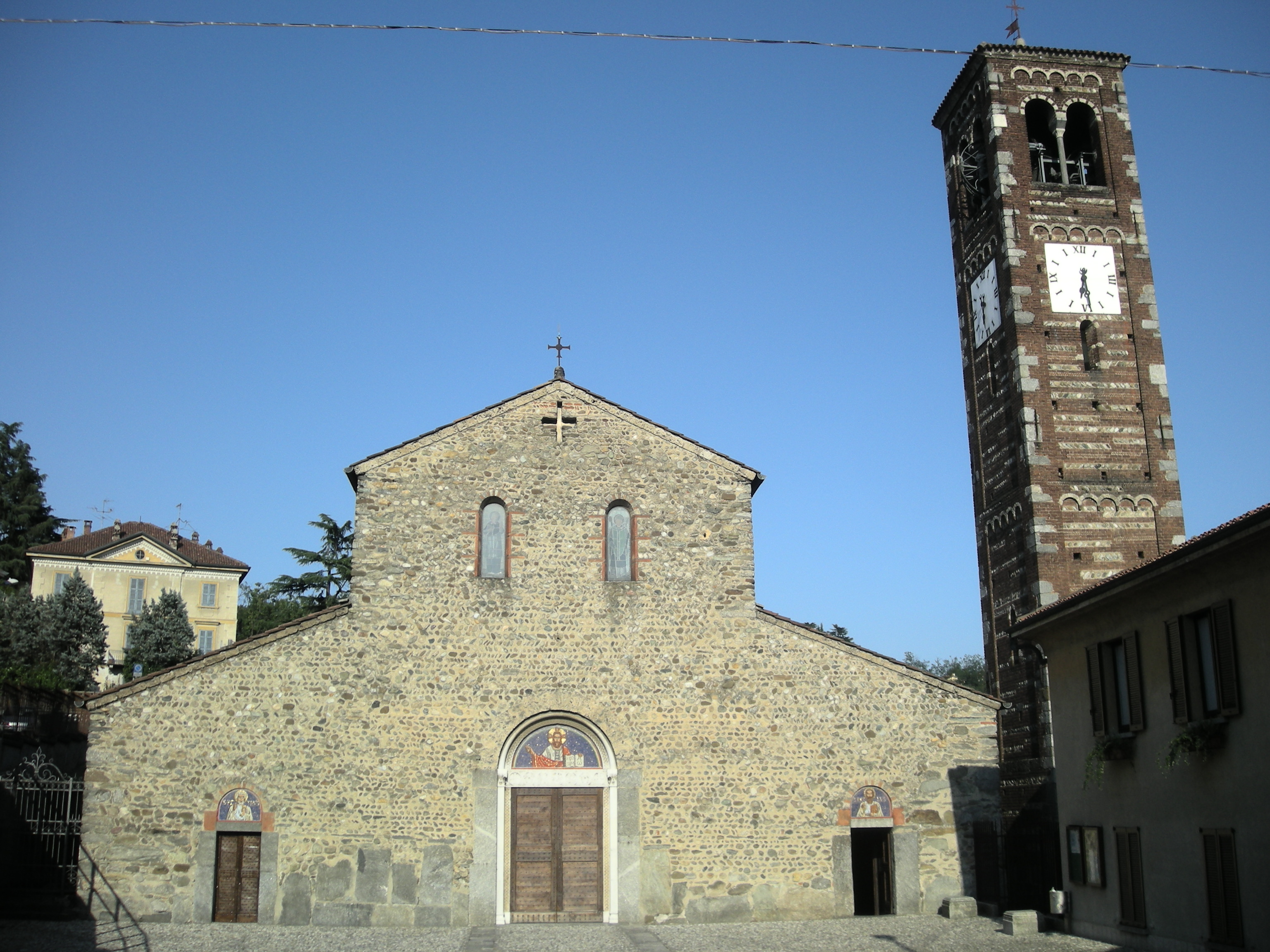
Basilica of Saints Peter and Paul in Agliate (Italy)

Santi Pietro e Paolo is a Romanesque-style, Roman Catholic basilica church in the frazione of Agliate of Carate Brianza, province of Monza and Brianza, region of Lombardy, Italy.

== History ==
The church was built in the 9th to 10th century, although the present structure was heavily reconstructed in the 19th century. The façade is not decorated with three entrances, one for each nave. These are separated by columns from a prior temple. Under the presbytery is a crypt. Most of the frescoes of the church are lost, but the adjacent 9 sided baptistery will retains frescoes from the 14th century and earlier. The present bell-tower was added in the late 19th century.
