= Collegio Rotondi =

Italian Collegio

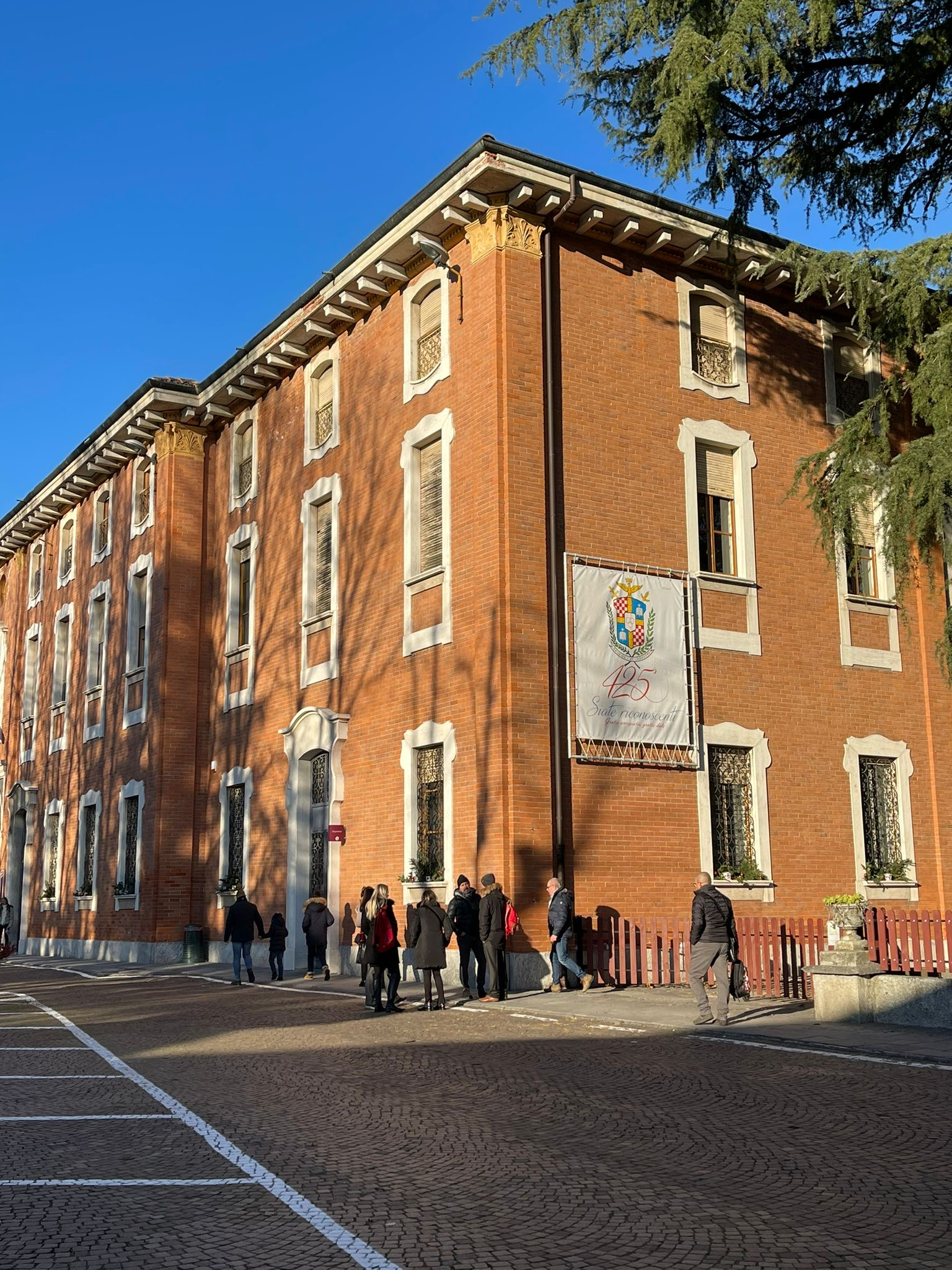

Location
- Via San Maurizio 4 Gorla Minore (VA), Lombardy, 21055; Italy; 45.644920°N 8.897510°E

Information
- Motto: Latin: Erudire et edocere (Instruct and educate)
- Established: 1599
- Founder: Giovanni Andrea Terzaghi
- Rector: Don Andrea Cattaneo
- Gender: Mixed
- Age range: 3-18
- Language: Italian
- Website: www.collegiorotondi.it/Objects/Home1.asp

Collegio Rotondi is a Catholic charter school located in Gorla Minore, a small town in the province of Varese, Lombardy. It was founded by the Italian nobleman Giovanni Andrea Terzaghi in 1599 and is the oldest recorded charter school in Italy.

The college was the first school in Italy to have a vertical curriculum. It has a nursery, a primary school, a secondary school, and two high schools. It includes a Museum of Natural Sciences, a Study Library, and the "Lina Airoldi Historical Library".

== History ==
=== 17th century ===
In 1599 Gorla Minore was governed by the Terzaghi family, native of Milan. Giovanni Terzaghi, the major canon of the Duomo, had no heirs and bequeathed his properties to the Oblates with the commitment to perpetually sustain the vitality of the Church of Saint Maurice and to create a place dedicated to the children's education.

In 1629, the Collegio of Oblates was established for young people from Gorla Minore and neighboring areas. Operated by religious personnel, the institute originated as a boys' boarding school. Due to its innovative teaching methods, it soon became a cultural hub and gained widespread recognition. Initially, the rector also served as the Prefect of the Church of Saint Maurice, as Terzaghi specified in his testament. With the school's continuous growth and development, the rector's role evolved to encompass additional responsibilities, such as school administration, teacher coordination, and all the administrative tasks.

=== 18th century ===
In the 18th century the Collegio modernized as Milan became one of the main poles of Illuminism, guided by the philosophical movement of rationalism and the growing affirmation of science. The renovation works facilitated the expansion of the structure, resulting in the construction of the main central building and the central courtyard used as a gathering place for the Collegio community.

The Collegio began to cooperate and collaborate with the institutional authorities which, at that time, were the Austrians; they recognized the work of the Collegio and its educational initiatives.

=== 19th century ===
In the 19th century the Collegio was impacted by Italian unification in 1861, which altered the power of the Church of Rome and of Pope Pius IX.

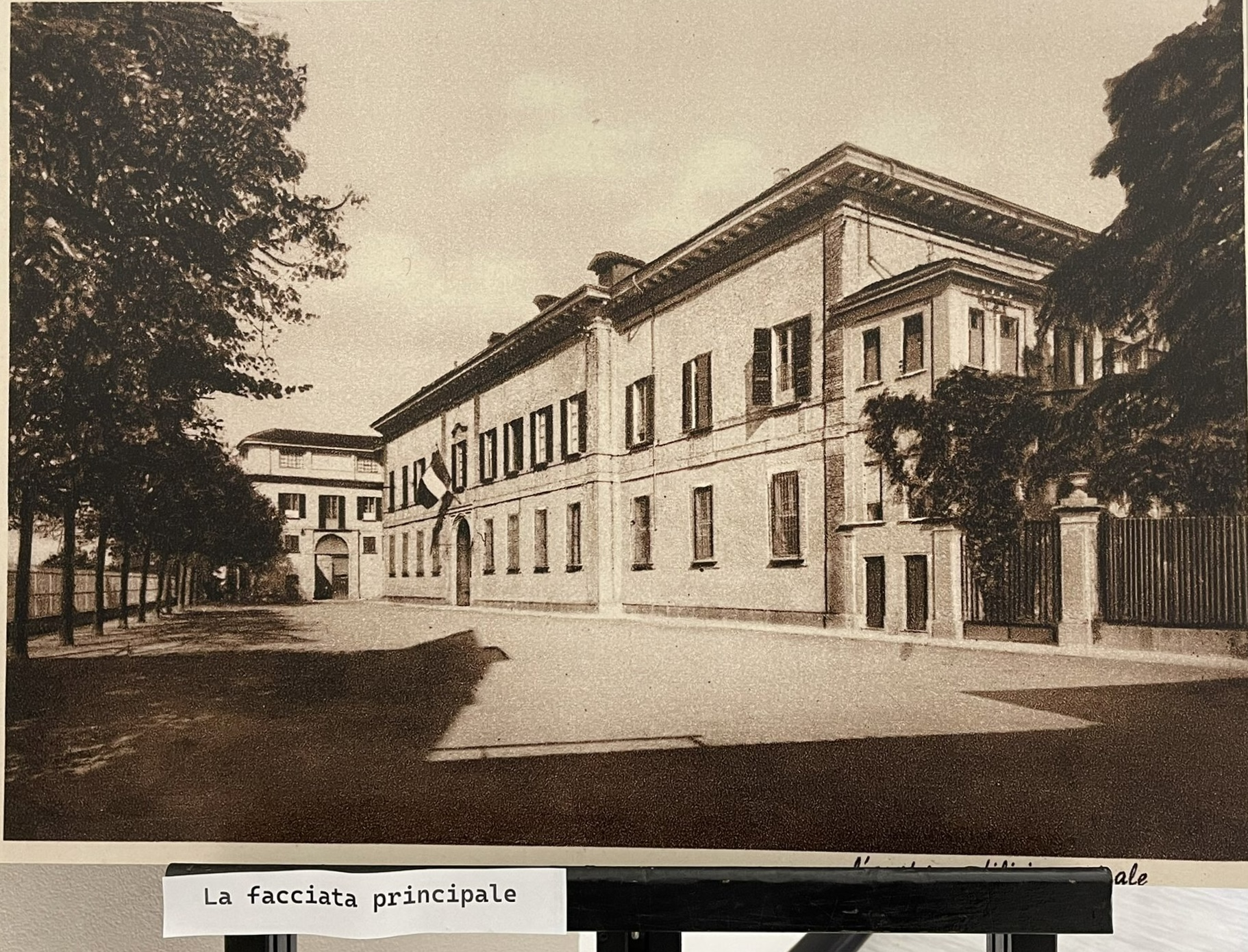
Old main facade of Collegio Rotondi

The two rectors Sioli and Rotondi used a series of legal actions to successfully free the Collegio from the congregation of the Oblates. This enabled the institute to have less pressure from the institutional authorities, allowing it to survive a tense period between the Church and the House of Savoy. For this reason, it changed its name to Collegio Rotondi, named after Rector Rotondi.

With the administration of Director Rotondi, the Collegio became a Catholic school guided by the bishop but retaining its independence. The Collegio expanded to accommodate the evolving demands and requirements placed upon it by the changes that the Industrial Revolution brought.

In 1899, on the occasion of the third centenary of the Collegio, a new section of the school, the high school, was inaugurated. This new department's construction was overseen by Don Davide Rossi.

=== 20th century ===
The early 20th century was a period of growth for the Collegio, with the railway to Milan, the Valmorea railway, increasing the number of people attending the school. In the final years of his rectorship, Don Rossi fought to obtain from the Italian Government new recognition to uphold the importance of the education the Collegio provided and restate its autonomy. In 1910, the board of direction of the Collegio approved the opening of a new branch of the school for girls, the Collegio Gonzaga that included an elementary school, middle school, high school, and a technical institute.

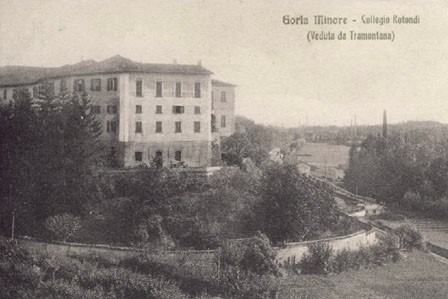
Collegio Rotondi in a postcard from the 1930s

After World War I, the Collegio returned to its regular life, reinforcing its renown and dealing with the school's needs, such as the contradictions of the Roman Catholic Church during fascism. During World War II, many students had to leave the Collegio to join the army, and the remaining ones struggled with hunger. The building was requisitioned and turned into an improvised military hospital.

When the war ended, the new rector, Don Pietro Cazzulani, started the first renovations from the monumental part of the old building and concentrated on education, continuing the teaching in the summer. The rectors that headed the school in the following years, Cazzulani, Mangini, Crotti, Silva, and Ferè, were all diocesan priests. The Oblates relinquished their attempt to keep the Collegio under their control. The authority of the school was reinforced, as well as the independence of its rectors. They aimed at a professional partnership between priests and teachers. The construction work of the Chapel of the Immaculate was completed.

The rector Don Lino Mangini opened two new educational courses, the classical and scientific high school programs. The succeeding rector, Don Carlo Crotti, completed several changes, finishing the construction of the new gym, initiated by Don Lino Mangini, and constructed new classrooms, functional buildings and new heating systems. The new auditorium, dedicated to the memory of the knight Benigno Airoldi, was inaugurated. The Collegio moved the female section in the original building, changing the norm of the school to a mixed-sex education model.

== Crest ==
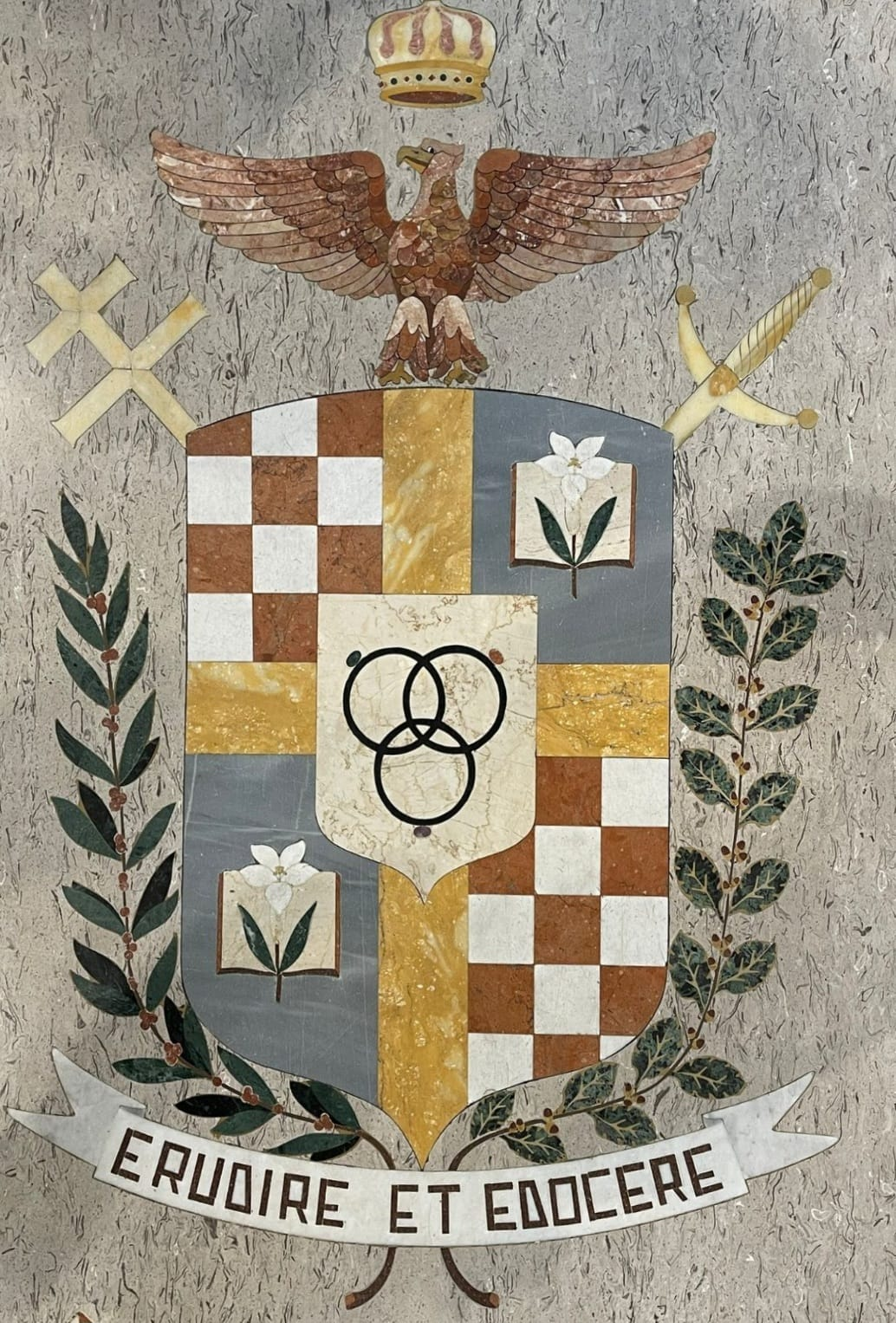
Crest of Collegio Rotondi

The crest of the Collegio was created after World War II and represents a shield, which is divided into four parts by a cross. Two of these parts contain a red and white chessboard, already present in the coat of arms of the Terzaghi family, as with other noble families, to represent battles and the strategies needed to win them. In the crest of the Collegio, it represents the struggle against ignorance as well as a tribute to the Milanese family. The remaining two parts are light blue and represent incorruptibility. In these parts, there is the effigy of an open book with a lily resting on it, the noblest of flowers. The book symbolizes erudition, while the lily symbolizes purity. At the center of the cross, there are three rings, already present in the crest of the Borromeo family. These recall Cardinal Federico, whose work led to the bequest of the Collegio to the Oblates from Giovanni Terzaghi. At the top left, there is the cross of Lorena, a symbol of faith, and at the top right the sword, a symbol of the strength of faith. Around the shield, there is bay tree, a symbol of glory, and oak, a symbol of strength against difficulties. At the top, there is a crowned eagle, evocative of the Holy Roman Empire, which is a symbol of power, victory, prosperity, and greatness.

The motto of the Collegio, represented in the lower part of the crest, is a phrase in Latin, taken from Giovanni Terzaghi's will and it is, "erudire et edocere". "Erudire", to teach, is the first step, followed by "edocere", to educate. Both steps are needed to bring out an individual's talents.

== Buildings and architecture ==
=== Central quadriporticus ===
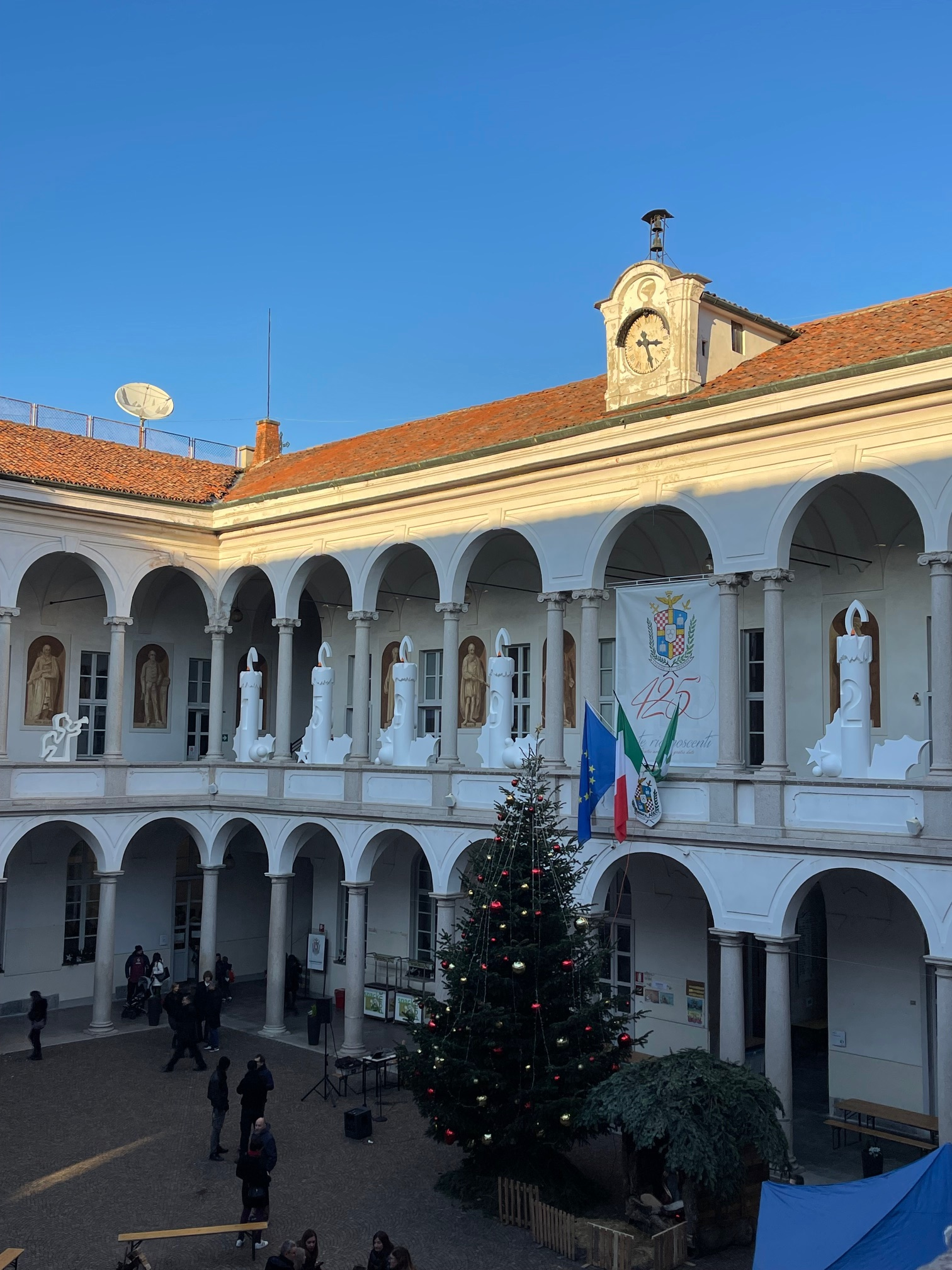
Central quadriporticus of Collegio Rotondi decorated for Christmas

The quadriporticus, in Italian quadriportico, was erected in the 18th century and is the center of the academic life of Collegio Rotondi. The yard is surrounded on both floors by a series of marble columns, except for the entrance side on the second floor. The two orders of columns create two logge, used by both students and professors to move from one side of the building to the other. It provides shelter from the rain in autumn and spring, and in summer from the sun and heat. Since its construction, this space has been used for didactical purposes.

=== Lower loggia ===
In the 19th century, several tridimensional maps were added on the walls of the lower loggia for didactic purposes. Only one exemplar remains, representing Italy. The others were removed in the second half of the 20th century to build new windows to create more light in the classrooms located on the lower level of the quadriporticus.

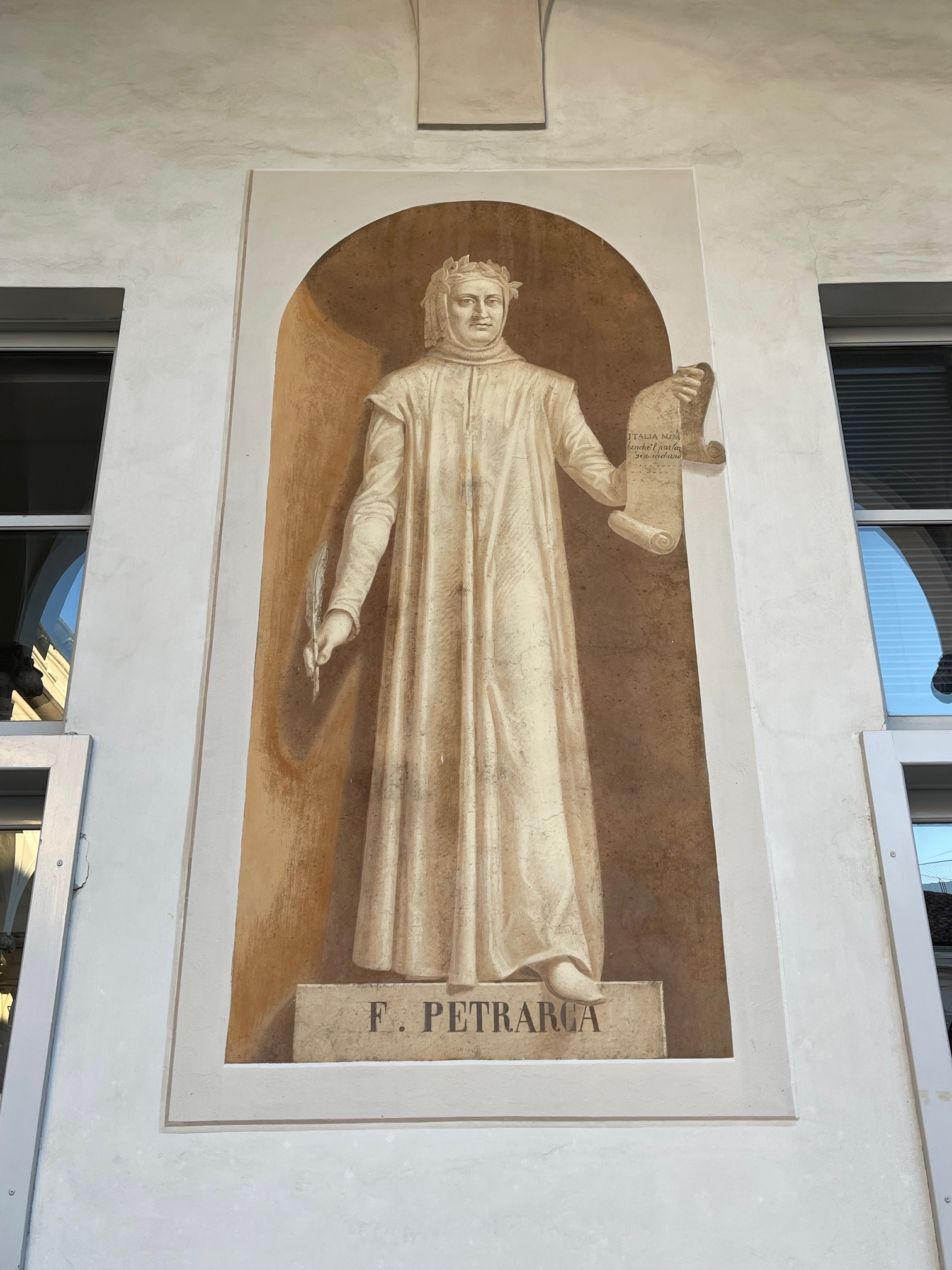
Francesco Petrarca represented as one of the spiriti magni in the upper loggia of the quadriporticus, Collegio Rotondi

=== Upper loggia ===
The walls of the upper loggia were decorated with a series of 24 pictures representing some of the most significant characters in Italian culture, called spiriti magni. Each figure is portrayed in statuesque poses inside a painted niche, with their names at the bases. The characters wear the typical garments of their corresponding era and each is represented with symbolic objects associated with them. The cycle of paintings was used by the professors to show and instruct students about the achievements or literary works made by the characters. The choice of the figures to be represented was carefully designed by the commissioners. All of the spiriti magni are Italian citizens, enclosed in the scientific, artistic, and literary context, and lived between the 18th and 19th centuries, except for two of them, Dante Alighieri and Francesco Petrarca, considered ubiquitous as the fathers of Italian Literature. Giovanni Boccaccio and other historical characters such as the poet Giacomo Leopardi and the musician Giuseppe Verdi, were not selected by the commissioners of the cycle of paintings due to their anticlerical and atheistic position towards the Church of Rome.

=== Chapel of the Immaculate ===
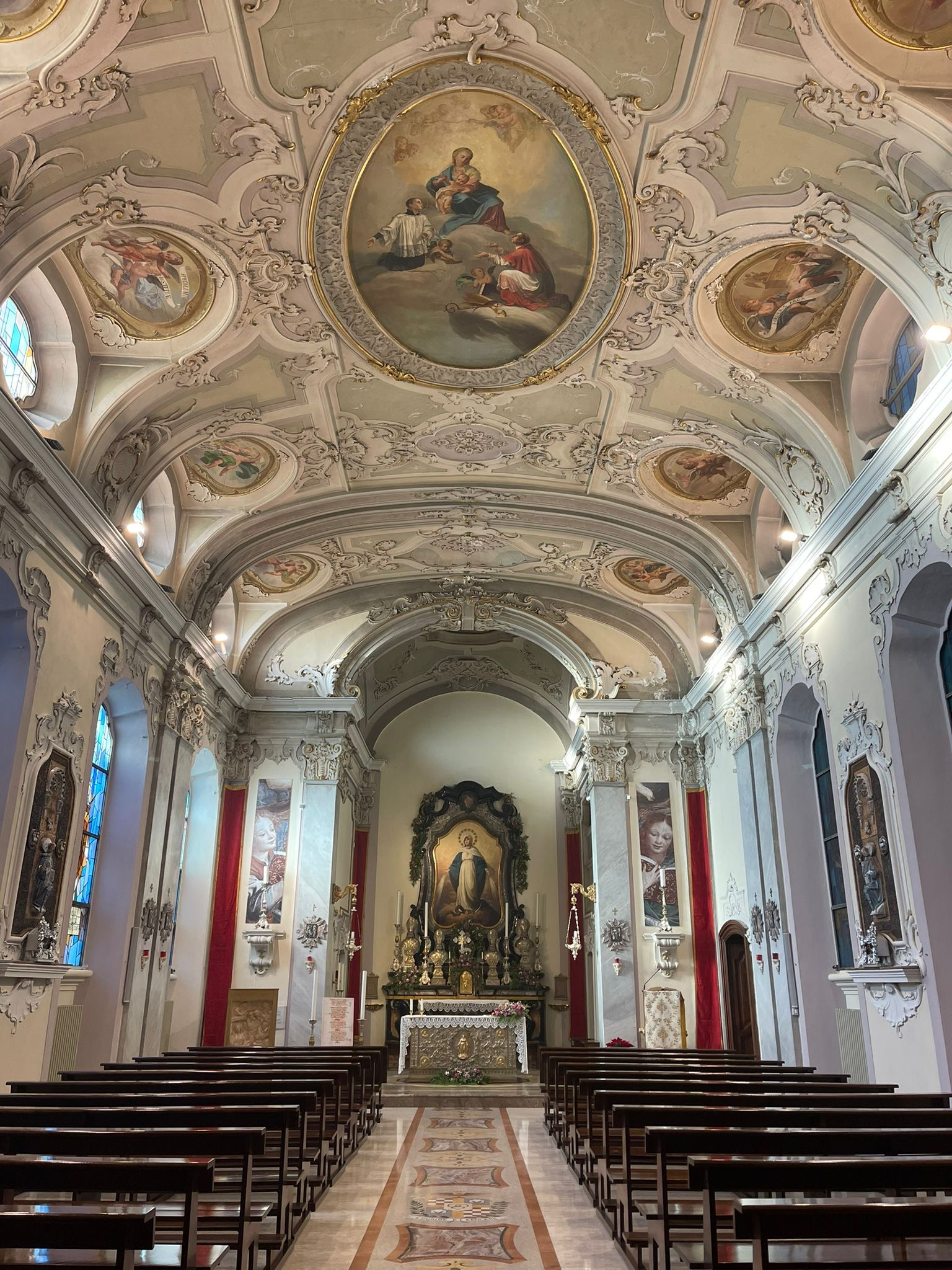
Nave of the Chapel of the Immaculate, Collegio Rotondi

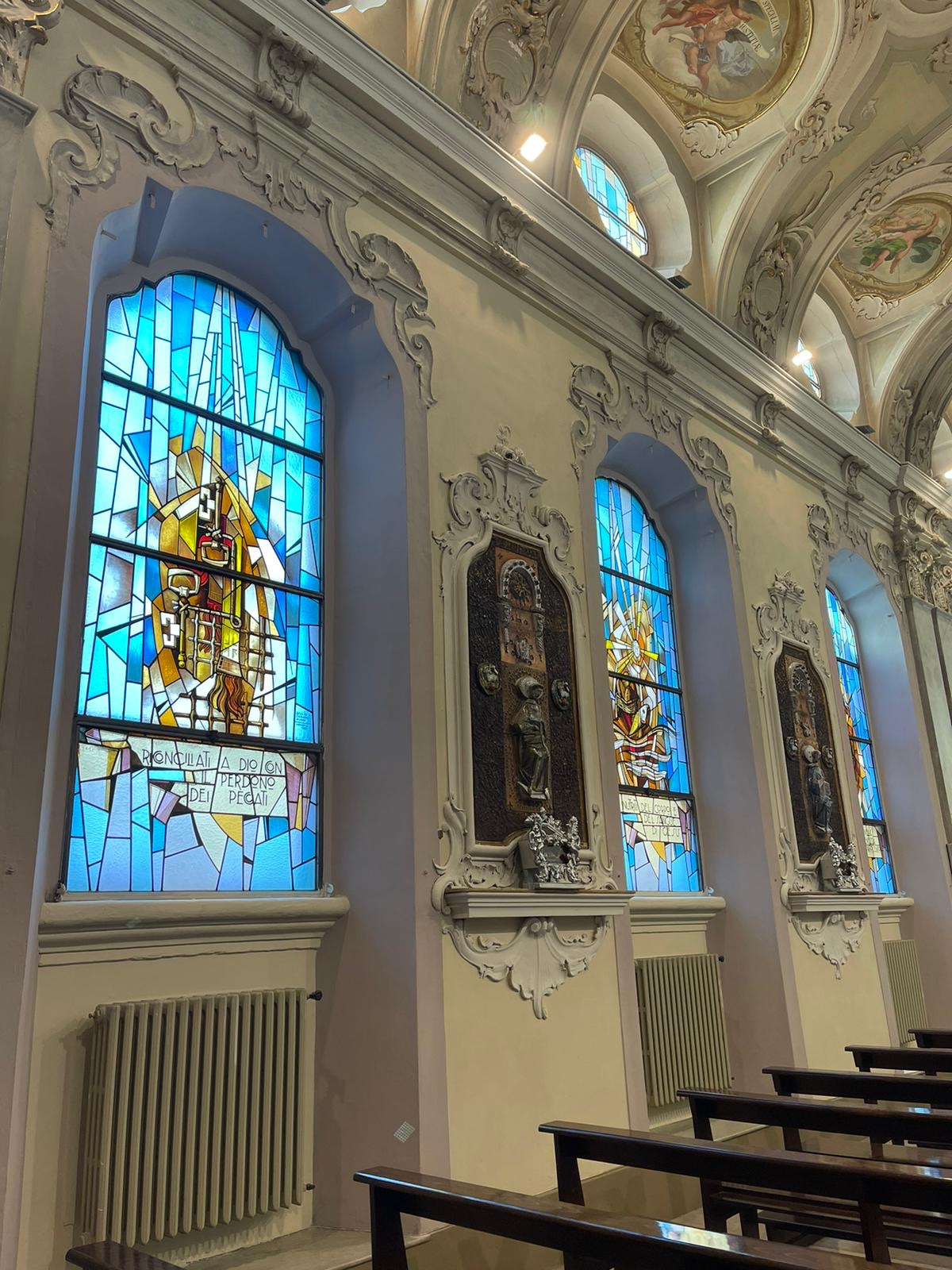
Representation of the seven Sacraments of the Catholic Church, Collegio Rotondi

During his rectorship, Don Giovanni Re wanted to build a chapel, the so-called Chapel of the Immaculate (Cappella dell'Immacolata), to provide the Collegio with a place of worship. The initiative was taken in 1885, as recorded on a marble memorial table inside. Since then, all the rectors have been responsible for its preservation. In the post-war period, Don Lino Mangini renovated the structure and enriched it with new artwork. Don Carlo Crotti modernized it by removing the baroque balustrade; this renovation process directly connected the nave with the altar.

The stained glass windows on the walls were added in the 1970s and are decorated with the representation of the seven Sacraments of the Catholic Church.

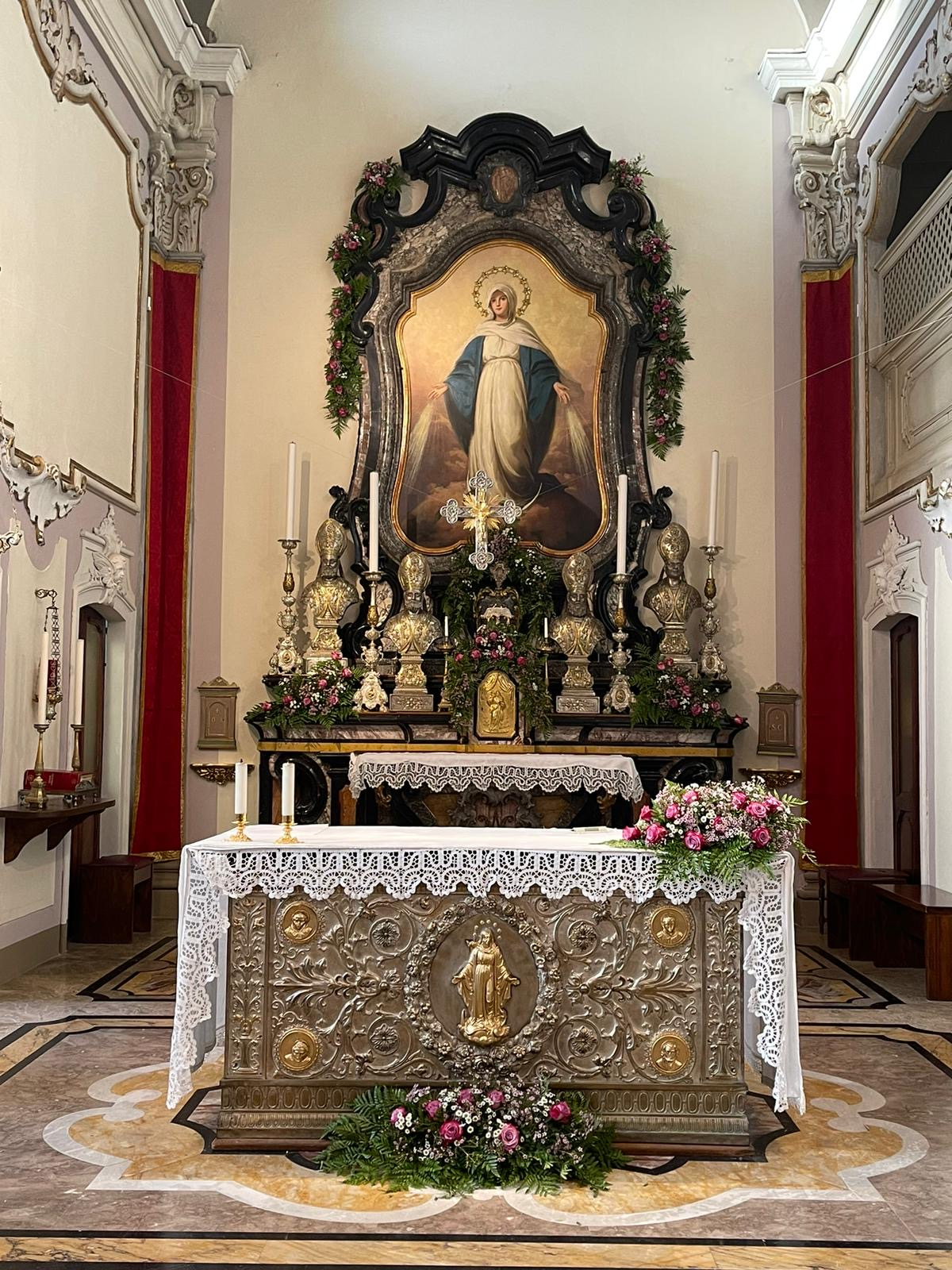
Virgin Mary and the altar of the Chapel of the Immaculate, Collegio Rotondi

The ceiling is richly decorated by stucco work and by the representation of Saint Charles Borromeo, founder of the Oblates, and of Aloysius Gonzaga, protector of the youth, in the act of adoring Our Lady with her child Jesus. On both sides of the ceiling are portrayed angels.

Above the altar is located a large painting, representing the canonical coronation. Virgin Mary's crown of stars was added during a ceremony in the presence of Pope Paul VI.

The physical representation of the crest of Collegio Rotondi is located inside the Cappella dell'Immacolata.

=== Church of Saint Maurice ===
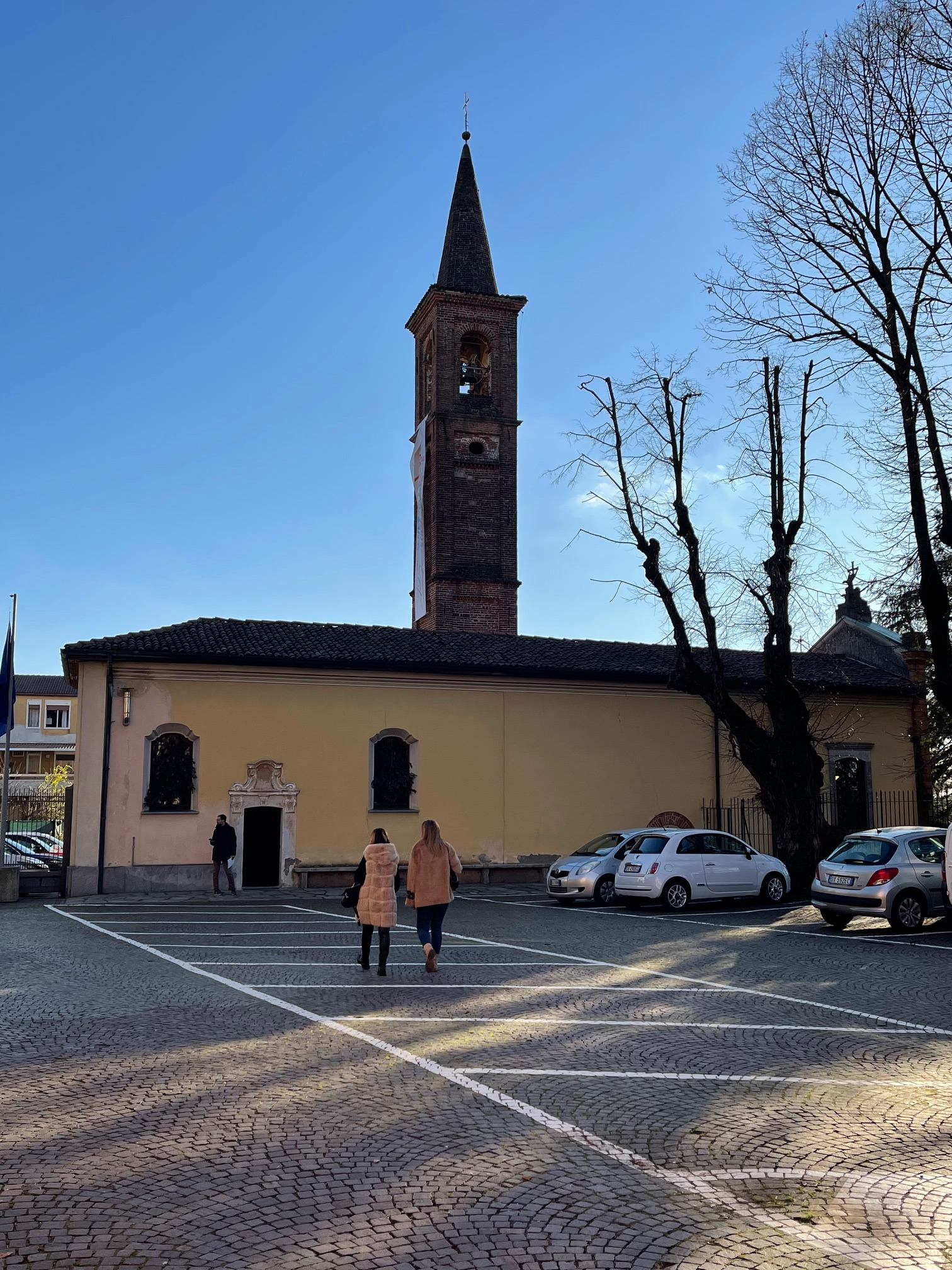
Exterior of the Church of Saint Maurice, Collegio Rotondi

The first historical evidence regarding the Church of Saint Maurice (Chiesa di San Maurizio) is documented in the ''Liber notitiae Sanctorum Mediolani'' written by Goffredo da Bussero and dated between 1290 and 1310. It states that the church was owned by the Terzaghi family and underwent numerous architectural modifications and enhancements over the years, particularly during the first half of the 18th century. In 1784, a new campanile was erected and a second bell was added. During the same period, the interior of the building was remodeled, including the apsidal area and the decorations.

During the 19th century, the Church of Saint Maurice was used as a subsidiary chapel of the church of Gorla Minore.

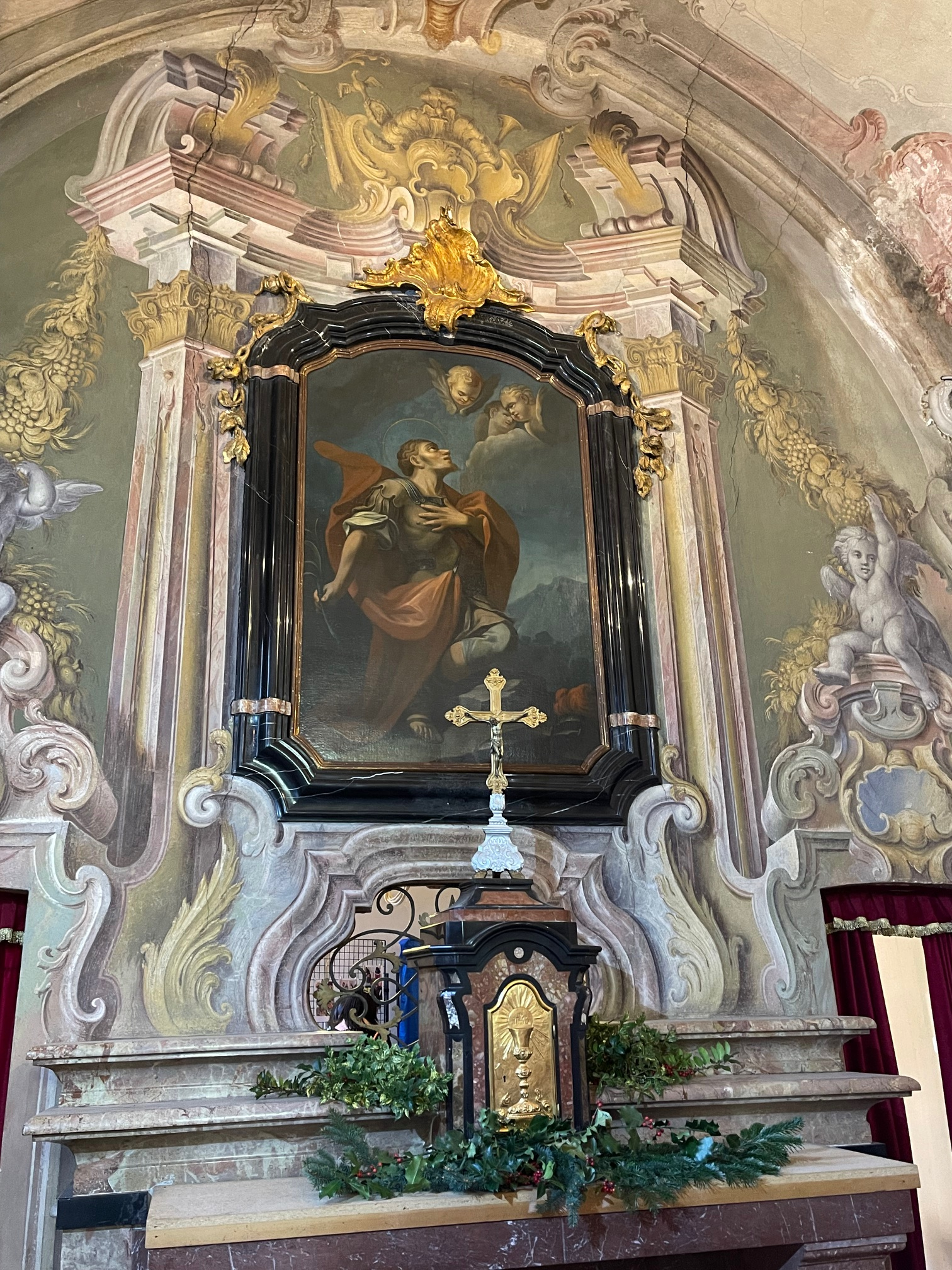
Altarpiece representing Saint Maurice, Collegio Rotondi

In the 20th century, Rector Monsignor Rossi undertook the restoration of the campanile, the facade and the frescoes within the church due to their degradation caused by humidity. Subsequent restoration work was carried out after World War II and in the 1970s when Rector Monsignor Lino Mangini extended the building's facade and constructed a crypt beneath it. It was used as a sepulcher, in which some of the benefactors of the Collegio, including Rector Mangini and some descendants of the Rotondi family were buried.

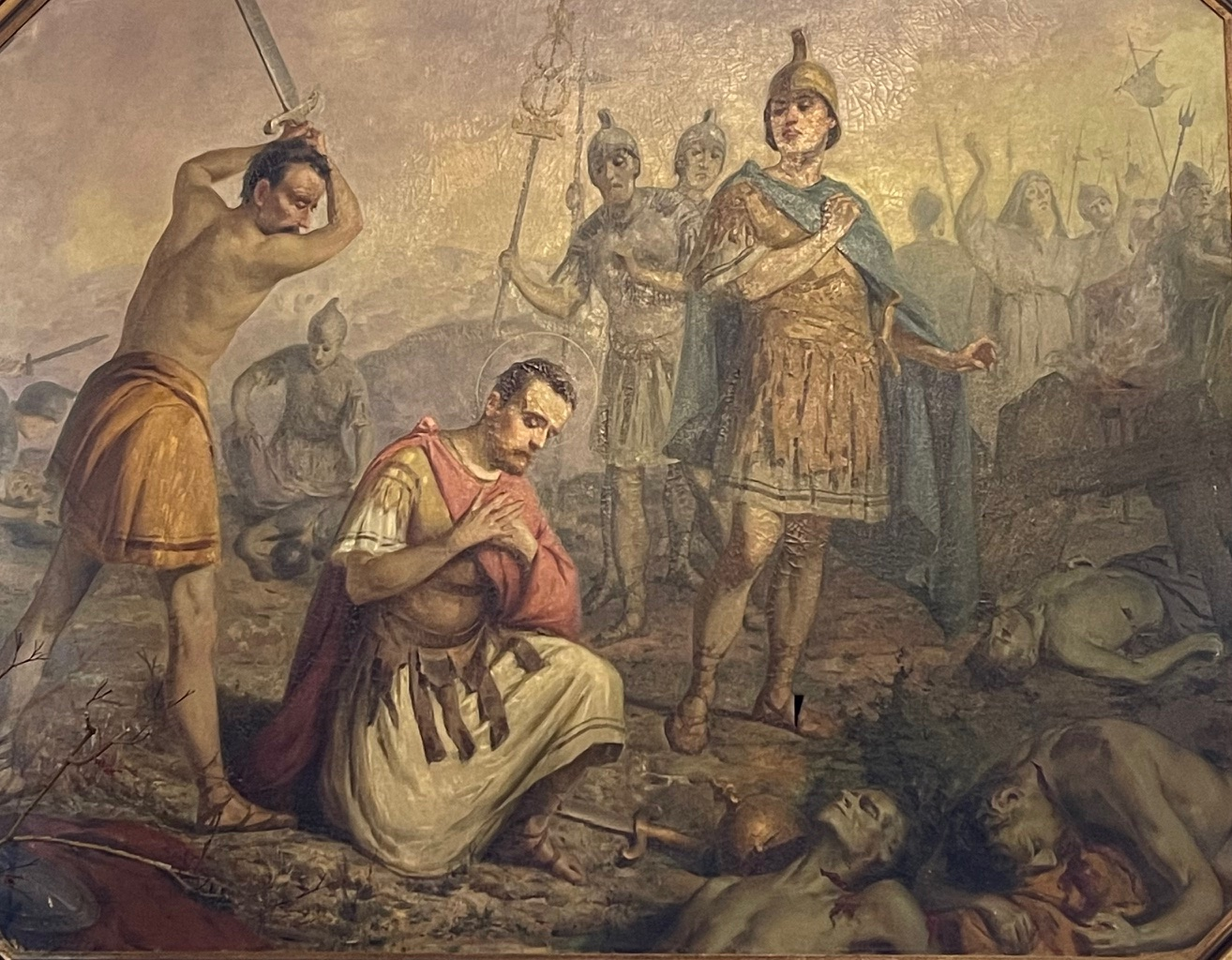
Martyrdom of Saint Maurice by David Beghè, Collegio Rotondi

During these works, some new frescoes were discovered: some are located in the apsidal area and present the typical features of Baroque, while the other two are along the central nave and respectively belong to the Middle Ages and Renaissance.

The first fresco represents the Martyrdom of Saint Agatha, while the second one a Saint with episcopal vestments, possibly Saint Ambrose. The inside is adorned by other baroque elements, including floral motives, angels, and a chorus of putti. On the wall over the altar, there is a plate of polychrome marble, enriched by a large altarpiece representing Saint Maurice (in Italian San Maurizio), from which the church takes its name. There are four pictures, realized by the Ligurian painter David Beghè, representing the Martyrdom of the Saint.

The bell tower is characterized by a simple architecture, realized in bricks, stones, and wood, that integrates with the surrounding buildings.

== Museum of Natural Sciences ==
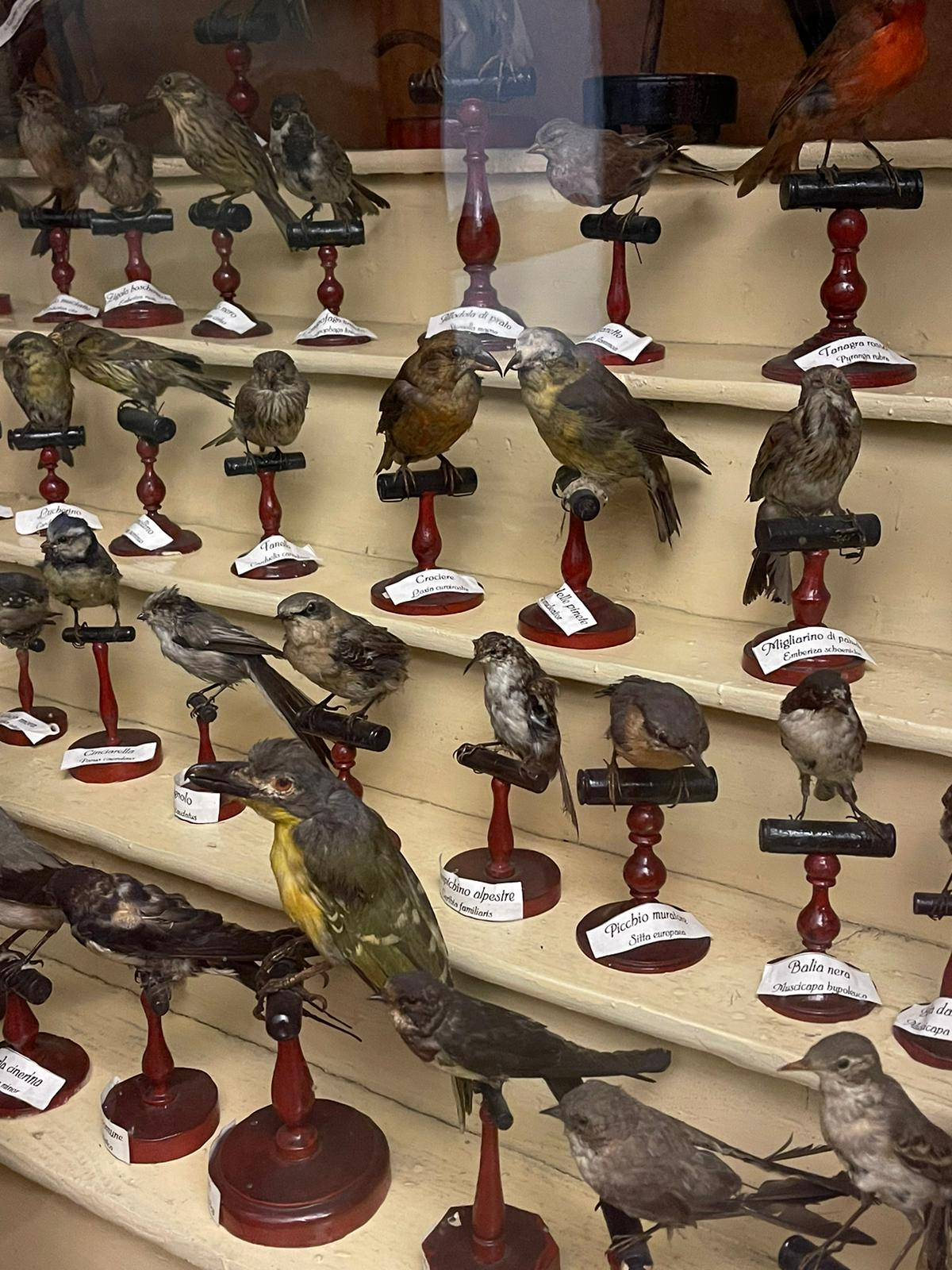
A part of the collection of stuffed birds at Collegio Rotondi

The Museum of Natural Sciences was set up around the second decade of the 19th century, when the Ministry of Education and Worship of the Austrian Empire launched a new school system in which the importance of the study of the natural sciences in any type of school was reaffirmed. The project of the new school system mentions:

"Natural history cannot be studied only in books. Excellent means, and necessary for the purchase of solid knowledge in Natural History, is to observe the object with their own eyes in nature... It is the Master's office to introduce the youthful spirit into the varied world of natural bodies.. teach him to observe well and to find the appropriate expression to signify the observed thing."

The museum was set up with special collections that only very few schools owned. It contains:

- A collection of stuffed animals, mostly from Africa and bird hunting activities.
- A collection of shells, prepared in formalin, plaster and papier-mâché anatomical plastics.
- A collection of classified minerals, including some from the Urals .
- Two human skeltons, one complete and one decomposed.

== The libraries ==
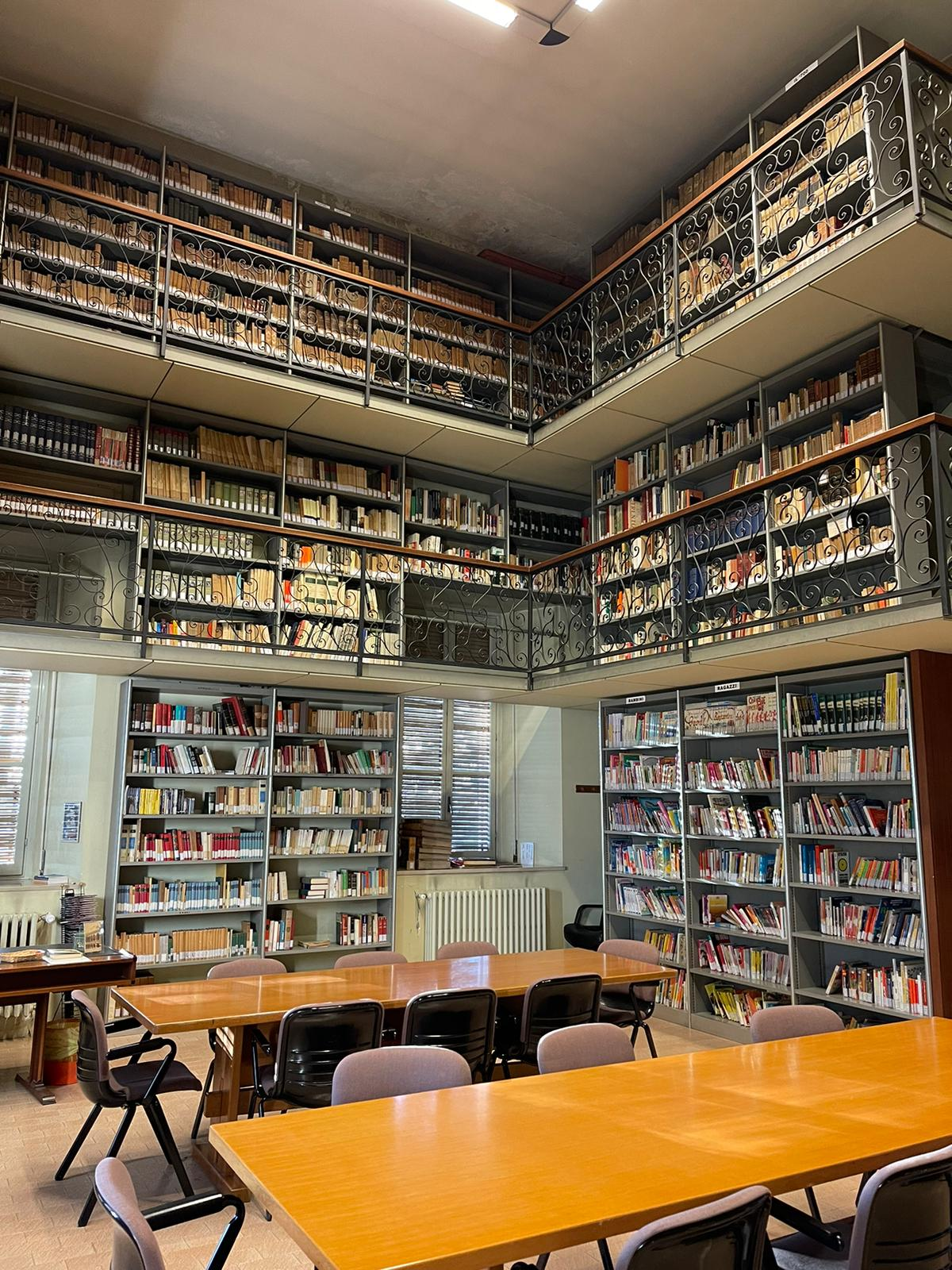
Historical Library of Collegio Rotondi

The complex houses two libraries: the Study Library and the Historical Library.

=== The Study Library ===
The Study Library is located on the first floor to the left of the quadriporticus, after the Chapel of the Immaculate.

It contains 19th century books and the theology fund. In 2023 the Library was reorganized and can be used by scholars and students in the afternoon for tutoring and guided study.

=== The "Historical Library" ===
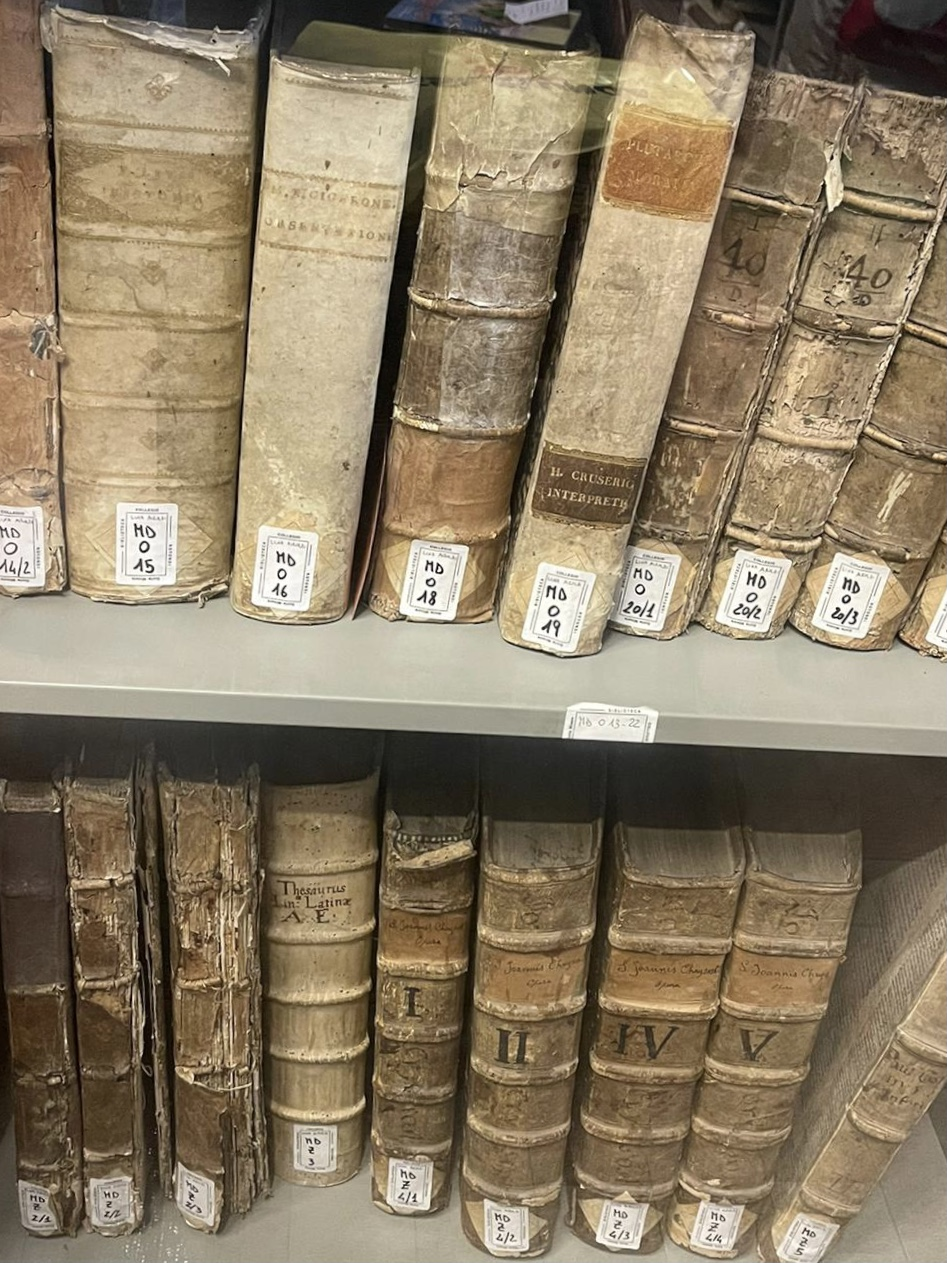
Some ancient books of the Historical Library at Collegio Rotondi

The Historical Library, known also as the "Lina Airoldi Library", is located on the right side of the quadriporticus above the Secretariat. It takes the name of ''Historical Library'', as it was built in the 1960s to house the oldest books of the Collegio: those published before 1900. Initially, the books were kept in a closet in the rector's study. Subsequently, with the enrichment of the collection derived from legacies (including teachers and rectors), the first library catalog was created in 1845.

It includes a section of antique volumes, comprising a collection of printed editions from the 16th to 20th centuries, and a modern section. The most valuable books include approximately fifty cinquecentine (printed volumes from the 17th century) and about one hundred secentine (printed volumes from the 16th century). There are also contemporary books available, enhanced by donations, including on history, art, and Italian and foreign fiction. There are approximately 12,500 volumes preserved, including an 1827 first edition of The Betrothed.

== Academic Profile ==
Collegio Rotondi has four levels of education and incorporates the two scientific and linguistic pathways standard across education in Italy.

=== Nursery ===
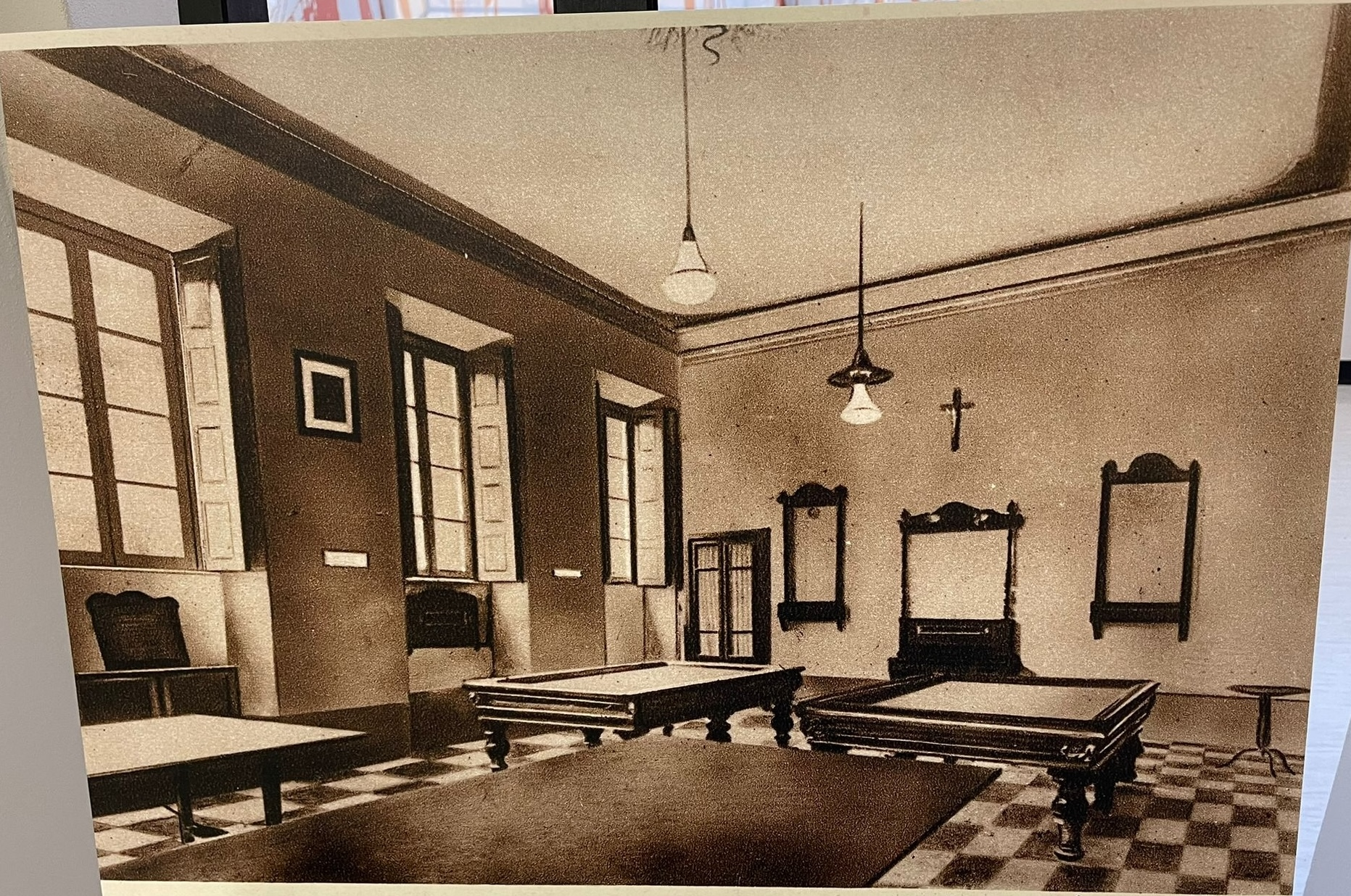
Old playroom at Collegio Rotondi

The nursery level (for children aged three to five) includes standard subjects taught at this level across educational institutions in Italy. A difference between the curriculum of Collegio Rotondi and other schools is that during the first year children are taught to experiment detachment from their parents, recognise cultural diversity, how to communicate their needs and emotions, and develop a sense of belonging.

=== Primary School ===
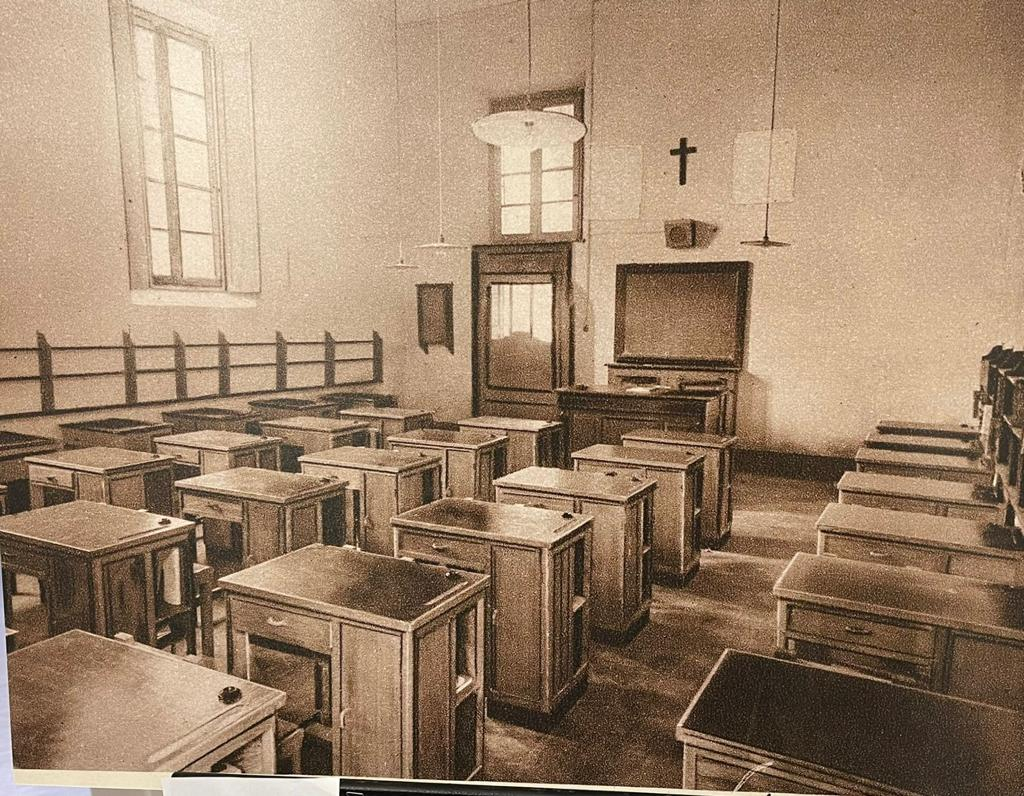
Old classroom at Collegio Rotondi

The five-year primary education period (from the ages of 5 to 10) includes a curriculum encompassing both Italian and English languages. Educational pursuits include subjects such as history, geography, music, sports, art, mathematics, science, and digital technology.

=== Secondary School ===
The secondary education level has a duration of three years in which students continue learning Italian, English, music, art, and motor science. Other subjects included are history, geography, mathematics, science, and technology. They can also learn a third foreign language, either Spanish or German.

=== High School ===
At the high school level, Collegio Rotondi offers two pathways, a linguistic and a scientific one. The Foreign Languages Lyceum, in Italian Liceo linguistico, is a linguistic high school pathway focused on the study of the cultural and grammatical side of three foreign languages: English, Spanish, and German. The Scientific Lyceum, in Italian Liceo scientifico, is a scientific pathway focused on the study of scientific modules like math, physics, computer science, and science. They also learn Italian, Latin, art, history, English, and philosophy.

=== Students ===
Number of students enrolled at Collegio Rotondi, 2012 - 2020
| | 2012/2013 | 2013/2014 | 2014/2015 | 2015/2016 | 2016/2017 | 2017/2018 | 2018/2019 | 2019/2020 |
|---|---|---|---|---|---|---|---|---|
| Nursery | 56 | 45 | 35 | 28 | 17 | 31 | 35 | 58 |
| Primary school | 109 | 110 | 96 | 94 | 99 | 124 | 128 | 157 |
| Secondary school | 115 | 99 | 92 | 82 | 89 | 102 | 118 | 146 |
| High school | 72 | 75 | 75 | 79 | 74 | 80 | 83 | 81 |
| Total | 352 | 329 | 298 | 283 | 279 | 337 | 364 | 442 |

=== Partnership and Collaboration ===
The Collegio Rotondi has maintained collaborative partnerships with various institutions since historical times. Recent partnerships include the University of Rome La Sapienza, Sportpiù, Polisportiva, and Altomilanese.

== Events ==
=== Anniversary ===
Every year on its anniversary, Collegio Rotondi celebrates to honor the institution. The event draws the participation of students, faculty, and community members. The commemorative ceremony includes addresses from the school's principal and faculty, along with a variety of performances and activities.

=== Cultural events ===
Collegio Rotondi hosts a variety of cultural events throughout the year which includes concerts, plays, exhibitions, film screenings and the school's annual concert.

== Notable people ==
- Eugenio Cantoni (1824–1888), former student at Collegio Rotondi and entrepreneur.
- Ludovico Necchi (1876–1930), former student at Collegio Rotondi and doctor.
- Mario Rotondi (1900–1984), former student at Collegio Rotondi and jurist.
- Giancarlo Landini (1953), professor of Italian literature and high school principal at Collegio Rotondi.
- Lorenzo Colombo (2000), former student at Collegio Rotondi and racing driver.
- Luciana Princisvalle, former student at Collegio Rotondi and assistant manager at BD.
- Giacinto Tredici (1880–1964), former teacher at Collegio Rotondi and philosopher.

== See also ==
- Province of Varese
- Catholic school
