= Davide Beghè =

Italian painter (1854–1933)

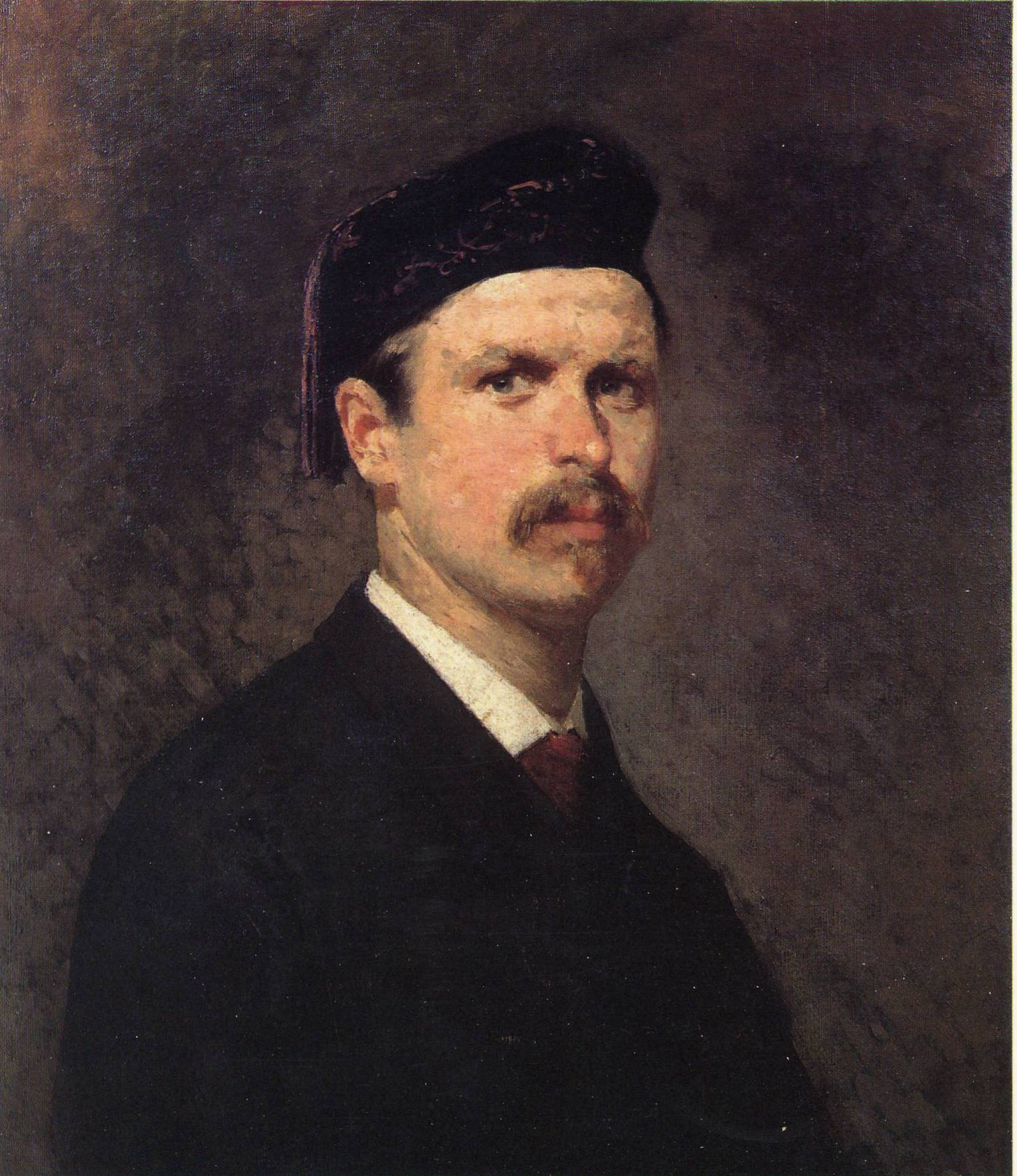
Davide Beghè

Davide Beghè (3 May 1854 – 17 January 1933) was an Italian painter, mainly depicting sacred subjects and portraits.

He was born in Calice al Cornoviglio in the province of La Spezia. he studied architecture at the Politecnico of Milan, but then, alongside Giovanni Segantini, he took lessons from Francesco Hayez and Giuseppe Bertini. He painted frescoes in a number of churches including Santa Maria in Binda near Nosate, Santa Maria Assunta in Gorla Maggiore, Church of Saint Maurice at Collegio Rotondi, in Gorla Minore, and the church of Bolano.

In 1992, the Comune of Calice al Cornoviglio established the Pinacoteca David Beghè, displaying a collection of 36 oil paintings and photos covering the painter's life.
