= Macherio =

- Comune
- Comune di Macherio
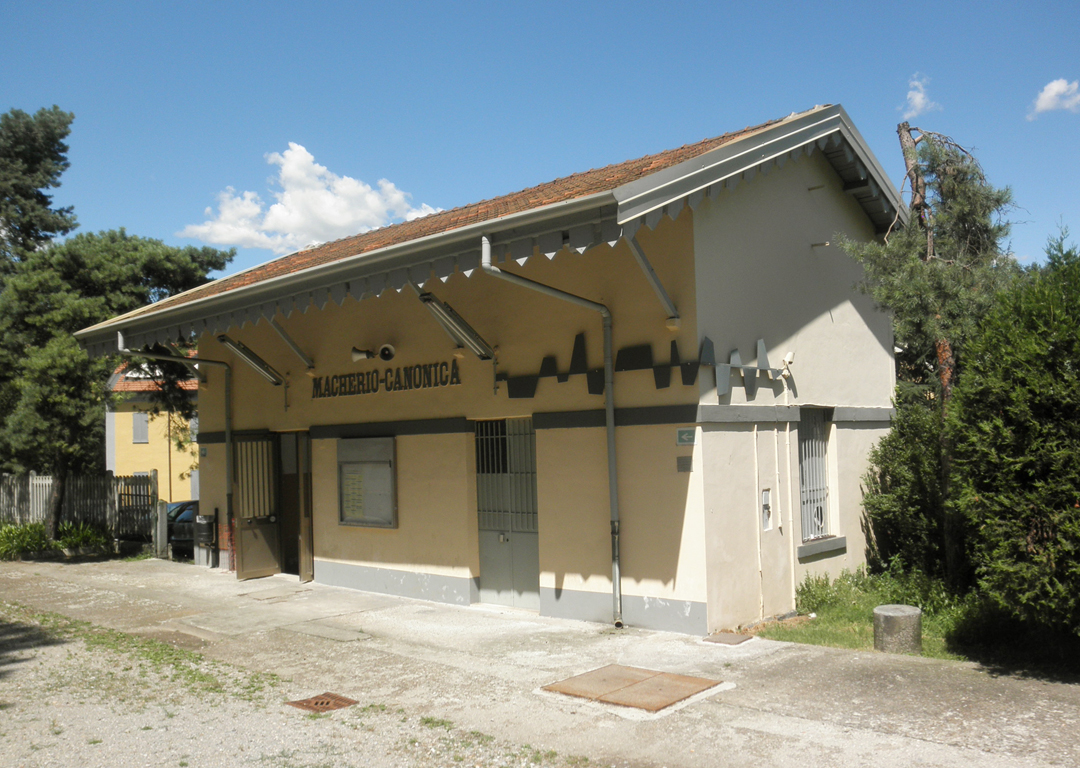

- Coat of arms

- Location within Italy Location within Lombardy
- Coordinates: 45°38′N 9°16′E
- Country: Italy
- Region: Lombardy
- Province: Monza and Brianza (MB)
- Frazioni: Bareggia, Pedresse, Belvedere

Area
  - Total: 3.2 km^{2} (1.2 sq mi)
- Elevation: 215 m (705 ft)

Population (Dec. 2004)
  - Total: 6,751
  - Density: 2,100/km^{2} (5,500/sq mi)
- Demonym: Macheriesi
- Time zone: UTC+1 (CET)
  - Summer (DST): UTC+2 (CEST)
- Postal code: 20846
- Dialing code: 039
- Website: Official website

Macherio is a comune (municipality) in the Province of Monza and Brianza in the Italian region Lombardy, located about 20 kilometres (12 mi) northeast of Milan. As of 31 December 2004, it had a population of 6,751 and an area of 3.2 square kilometres (1.2 mi^{2}).

The municipality of Macherio contains the frazioni (subdivisions, mainly villages and hamlets) Bareggia, Pedresse, and Belvedere.

Macherio borders the following municipalities: Triuggio, Lesmo, Sovico, Biassono, Lissone.

== Demographic evolution ==
Historical population

Year	Pop.	±%
1861	1,372	—
1871	1,553	+13.2%
1881	1,747	+12.5%
1901	2,216	+26.8%
1911	2,631	+18.7%

Year	Pop.	±%
1921	2,903	+10.3%
1931	3,253	+12.1%
1936	3,367	+3.5%
1951	4,012	+19.2%
1961	4,531	+12.9%

Year	Pop.	±%
1971	5,433	+19.9%
1981	6,581	+21.1%
1991	6,435	−2.2%
2001	6,461	+0.4%

Source: Data from ISTAT
