= Albiate =

Albiate AElbiàa (Lombard)
- Comune
- Comune di Albiate
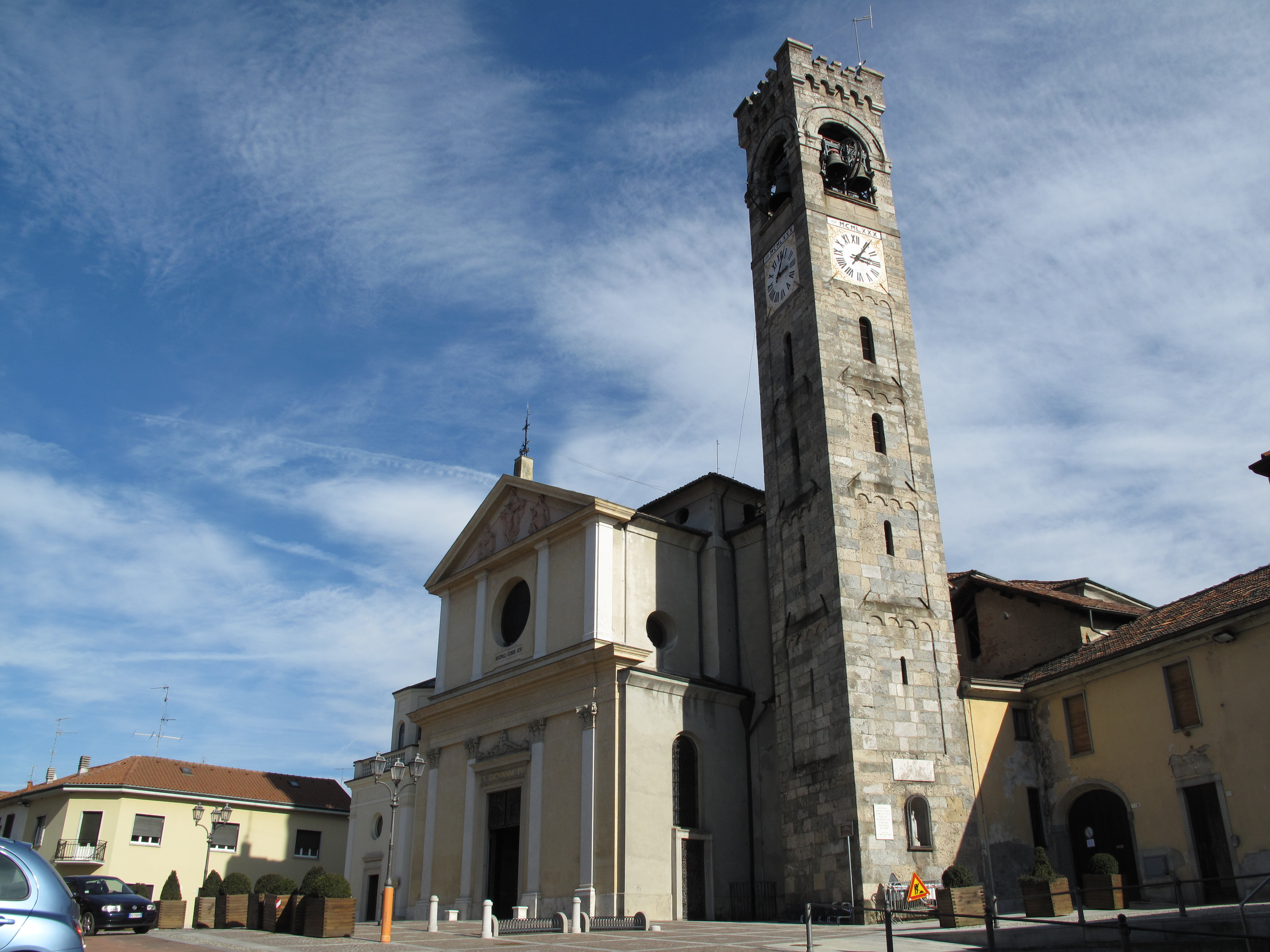
- View of Albiate

- Coat of arms

- Location of Albiate in Italy Albiate (Lombardy)
- Coordinates: 45°40′N 9°15′E
- Country: Italy
- Region: Lombardy
- Province: Monza and Brianza (MB)

Area
  - Total: 2.9 km^{2} (1.1 sq mi)
- Elevation: 233 m (764 ft)

Population (31 December 2005)
  - Total: 5,877
  - Density: 2,000/km^{2} (5,200/sq mi)
- Demonym: Albiatesi
- Time zone: UTC+1 (CET)
  - Summer (DST): UTC+2 (CEST)
- Postal code: 20847
- Dialing code: 0362
- Patron saint: San Fermo
- Saint day: 9 August
- Website: Official website

Albiate (Brianzöö: AElbiàa) is a town and commune in the province of Monza and Brianza. It lies 25 kilometres (16 mi) north of Milan, at an elevation of 250 metres (820 ft) above sea level where the last morenic hills of upper Lombardy meet the Lombard plain. It borders on the communes of Seregno, Carate Brianza, Sovico, Triuggio, Lissone.

== Sports ==
The Associazione Calcio Albiatese is an amateur football club founded in the spring of 1920 in Albiate. In 1969, Albiatese was refounded and entered the Terza Categoria championship under the Monza Local Committee.
