= Sovico =

- Comune
- Comune di Sovico
- Coat of arms

- Location within Italy Location within Lombardy
- Coordinates: 45°39′N 9°16′E
- Country: Italy
- Region: Lombardy
- Province: Monza and Brianza (MB)

Government
  - Mayor: Barbara Magni (Lega Nord, Centrodestra Sovico)

Area
  - Total: 3.2 km^{2} (1.2 sq mi)
- Elevation: 221 m (725 ft)

Population (2018)
  - Total: 8,359
  - Density: 2,600/km^{2} (6,800/sq mi)
- Demonym: Sovicesi
- Time zone: UTC+1 (CET)
  - Summer (DST): UTC+2 (CEST)
- Postal code: 20845
- Dialing code: 039
- Patron saint: Santi Simone e Giuda
- Saint day: Last Sunday of October
- Website: Official website

Sovico is a comune (municipality) in the Province of Monza and Brianza in the Italian region Lombardy, located about 20 kilometres (12 mi) northeast of Milan. As of 31 December 2004, it had a population of 7,329 and an area of 3.2 square kilometres (1.2 mi^{2}).

Sovico borders the following municipalities: Triuggio, Albiate, Macherio, Lissone.

== Demographic evolution ==
Historical population

Year	Pop.	±%
1861	1,265	—
1871	1,344	+6.2%
1881	1,589	+18.2%
1901	2,304	+45.0%
1911	2,632	+14.2%

Year	Pop.	±%
1921	2,847	+8.2%
1931	3,225	+13.3%
1936	3,552	+10.1%
1951	4,268	+20.2%
1961	4,819	+12.9%

Year	Pop.	±%
1971	6,146	+27.5%
1981	6,527	+6.2%
1991	6,875	+5.3%
2001	7,043	+2.4%

Source: Data from ISTAT
