= Correzzana =

- Comune
- Comune di Correzzana
- Coat of arms

- Location within Italy Location within Lombardy
- Coordinates: 45°40′N 9°18′E
- Country: Italy
- Region: Lombardy
- Province: Monza and Brianza (MB)

Government
  - Mayor: Marco Beretta

Area
  - Total: 2.5 km^{2} (0.97 sq mi)
- Elevation: 250 m (820 ft)

Population (Dec. 2004)
  - Total: 2,100
  - Density: 840/km^{2} (2,200/sq mi)
- Demonym: Correzzanesi
- Time zone: UTC+1 (CET)
  - Summer (DST): UTC+2 (CEST)
- Postal code: 20856
- Dialing code: 039
- Website: Official website

Correzzana (Milanese: Corresan) is a comune (municipality) in the Province of Monza and Brianza in the Italian region of Lombardy, located about 25 kilometres (16 mi) northeast of Milan.

Correzzana borders the following municipalities: Besana in Brianza, Casatenovo, Triuggio, Lesmo.
