= Villa Lattuada =

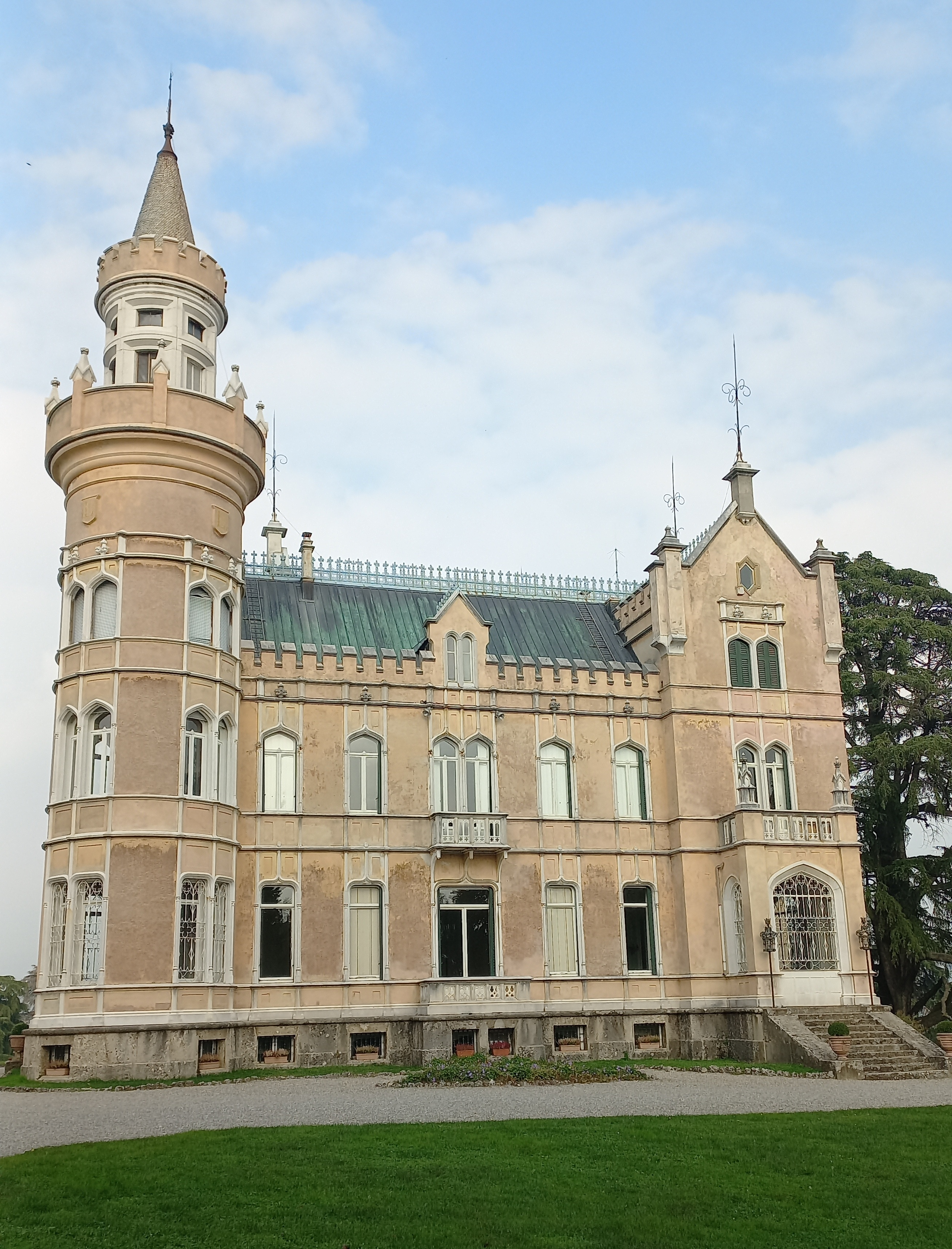
- Villa Lattuada in 2025
- Click on the map for a fullscreen view

General information
- Location: Casatenovo, Italy
- Coordinates: 45°41′41.2″N 9°19′06.1″E

Villa Lattuada is a historic villa located in Casatenovo, Italy.

== History ==
Built on the remains of a former convent later used as a farmhouse, the villa was built between 1883 and 1885 to a design by Antonio Tagliaferri at the request of the Lattuada family. The interiors were later refurbished by Achille Mainoni d'Intignano.

King Umberto I visited the villa.

== Description ==
The villa, located in Casatenovo north of Milan, is set within a large park surrounded by woodland.

The building, which features a Gothic Revival style, has a quadrangular layout enriched by two tall towers on the western façade, one of which is topped by a spire.

== Gallery ==
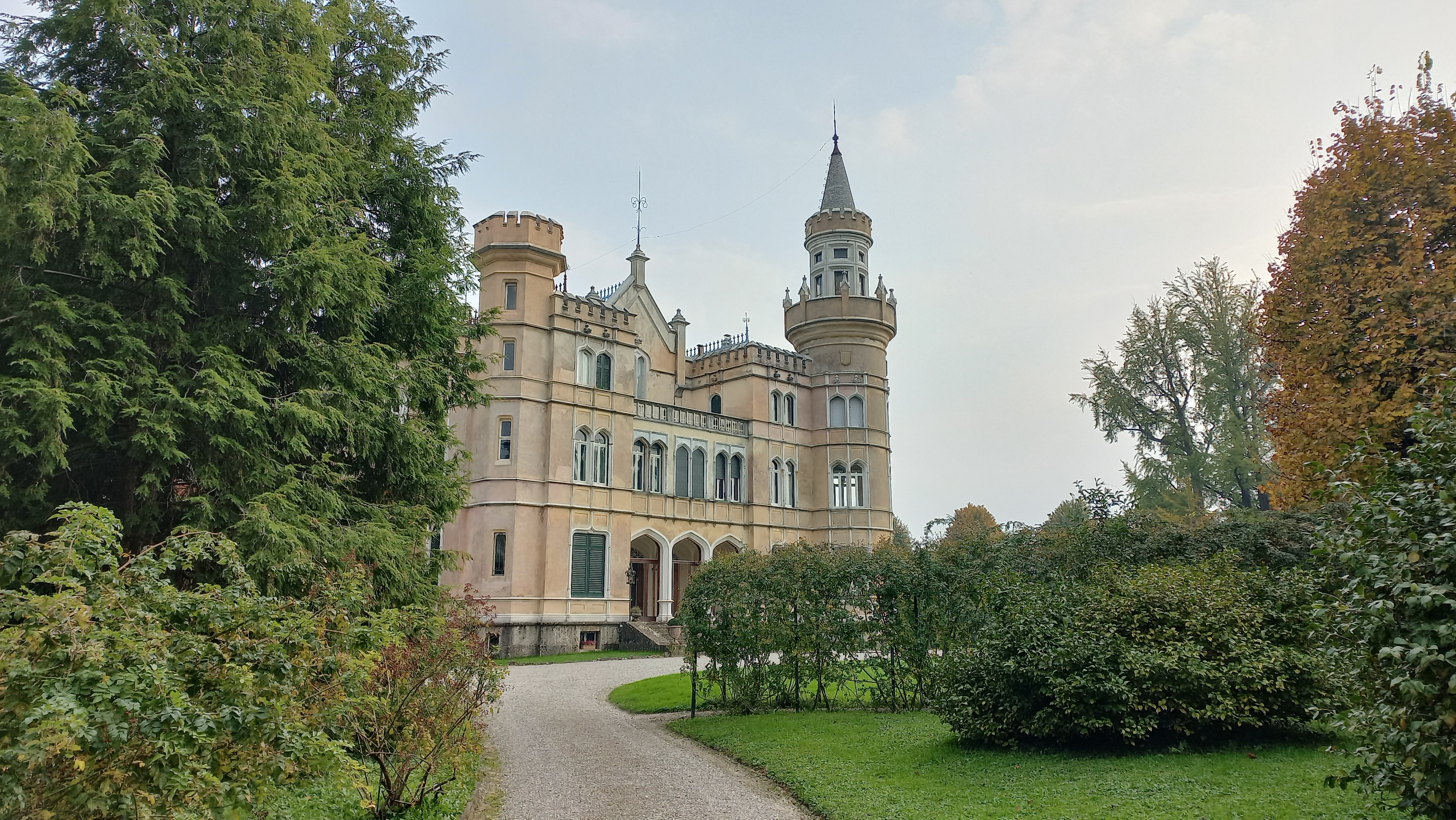

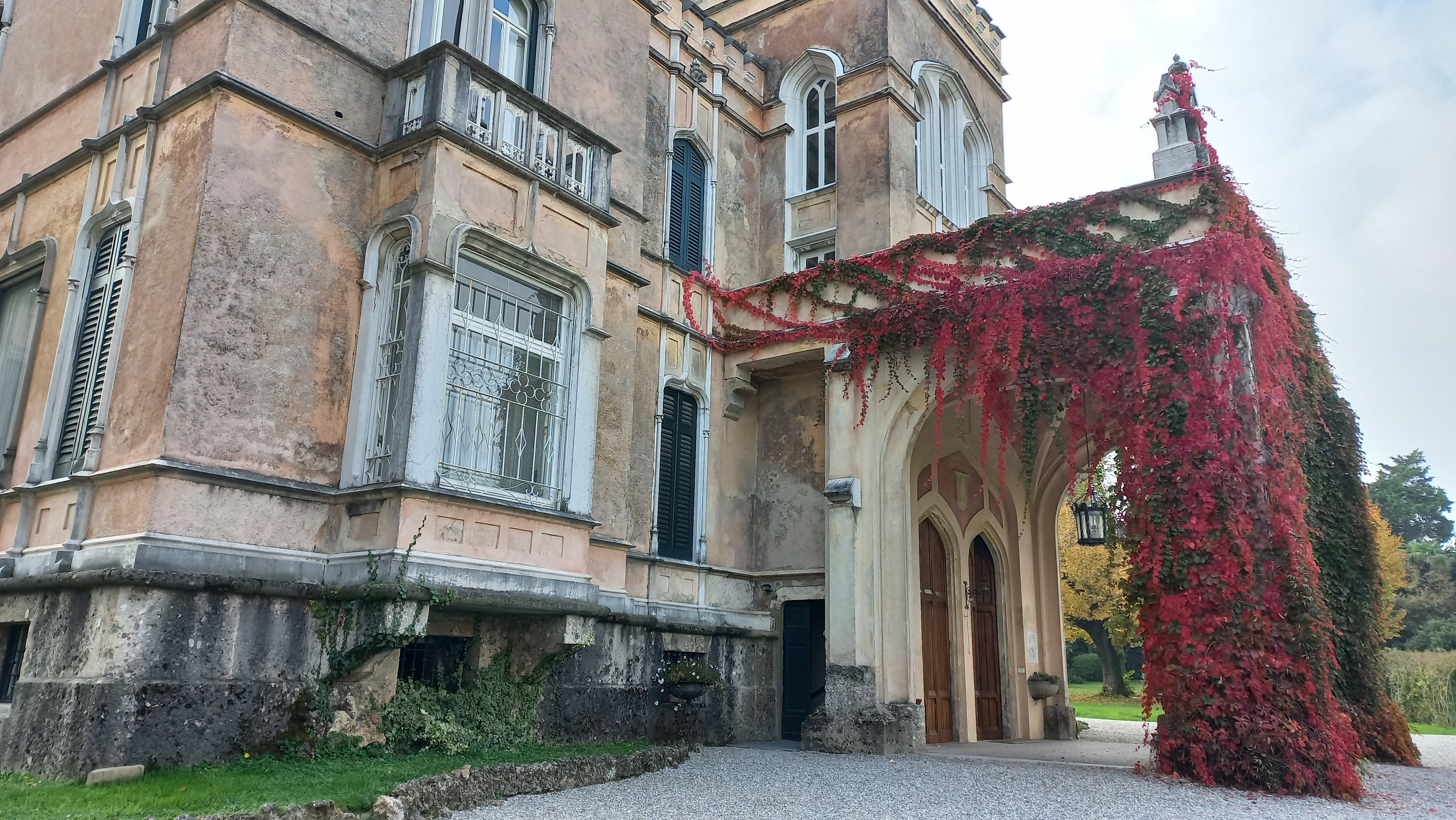

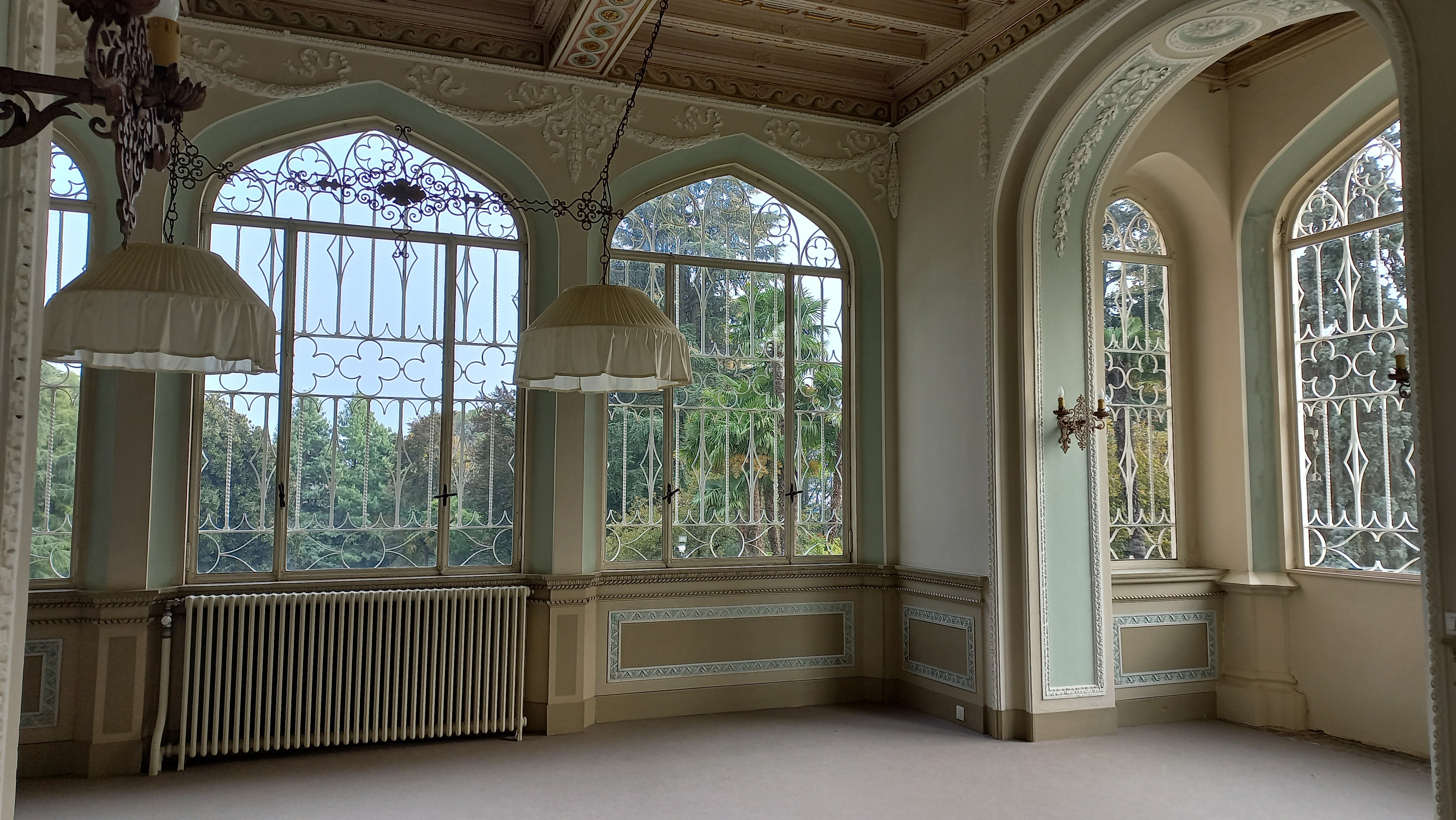
