= Lesmo =

- Comune
- Comune di Lesmo
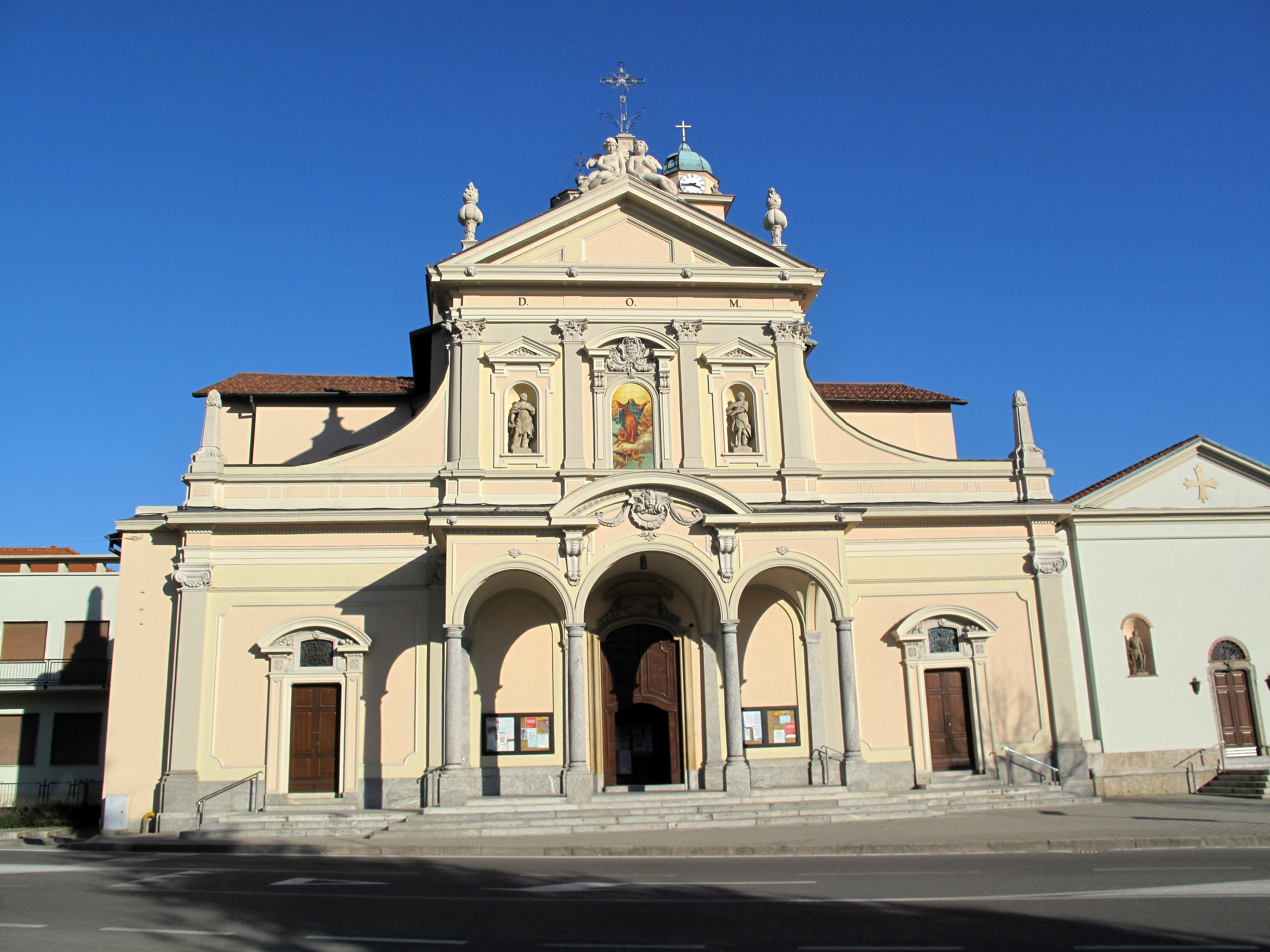
- Parish church of Santa Maria Assunta.

- Coat of arms

- Location within Italy Location within Lombardy
- Coordinates: 45°39′N 9°19′E
- Country: Italy
- Region: Lombardy
- Province: Monza and Brianza (MB)
- Frazioni: California, Gerno, Peregallo

Government
  - Mayor: Roberto Antonioli

Area
  - Total: 5.1 km^{2} (2.0 sq mi)
- Elevation: 190 m (620 ft)

Population (31 August 2009)
  - Total: 7,792
  - Density: 1,500/km^{2} (4,000/sq mi)
- Demonym: Lesmesi
- Time zone: UTC+1 (CET)
  - Summer (DST): UTC+2 (CEST)
- Postal code: 20855
- Dialing code: 039
- Website: Official website

Lesmo is a comune (municipality) in the Province of Monza and Brianza in the Italian region Lombardy, located about 25 kilometres (16 mi) northeast of Milan.

== Geography ==
Lesmo borders the following municipalities: Casatenovo, Triuggio, Correzzana, Camparada, Arcore, Macherio, Biassono.

Two corners (currently numbered Turns 6 and 7) on the Monza Circuit are named after the town, and have been since the track first opened in 1922.

== History ==
The town is currently administered by Lesmo Amica with Roberto Antonioli as mayor and Marco Fumagalli as vice mayor.
