= Lomagna =

Lomagna Lumàgna (Lombard)
- Comune
- Comune di Lomagna
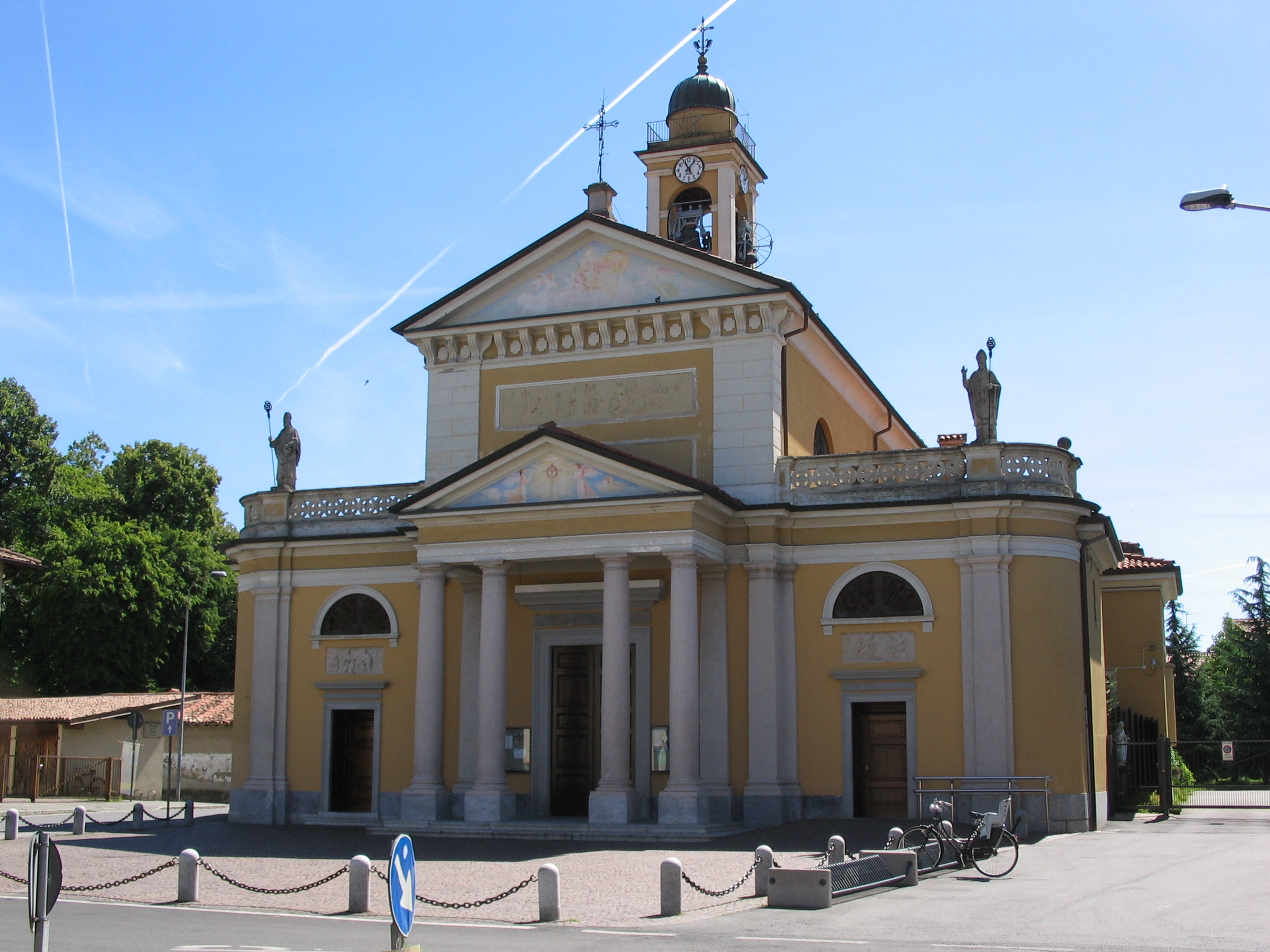
- Church of Saints Peter and Paul

- Coat of arms

- Location within Italy Location within Lombardy
- Coordinates: 45°40′N 9°22′E
- Country: Italy
- Region: Lombardy
- Province: Lecco (LC)

Government
  - Mayor: Cristina Citterio

Area
  - Total: 3.9 km^{2} (1.5 sq mi)

Population (Dec. 2004)
  - Total: 4,157
  - Density: 1,100/km^{2} (2,800/sq mi)
- Demonym: Lomagnesi
- Time zone: UTC+1 (CET)
  - Summer (DST): UTC+2 (CEST)
- Postal code: 23871
- Dialing code: 039
- Website: Official website

Lomagna (Brianzöö: Lumàgna) is a comune (municipality) in the Province of Lecco in the Italian region Lombardy, located about 25 kilometres (16 mi) northeast of Milan and about 20 kilometres (12 mi) south of Lecco.

Lomagna borders the following municipalities: Carnate, Casatenovo, Missaglia, Osnago, Usmate Velate.
