= Lissone =

Lissone Lisson (Lombard)
- Comune
- Città di Lissone
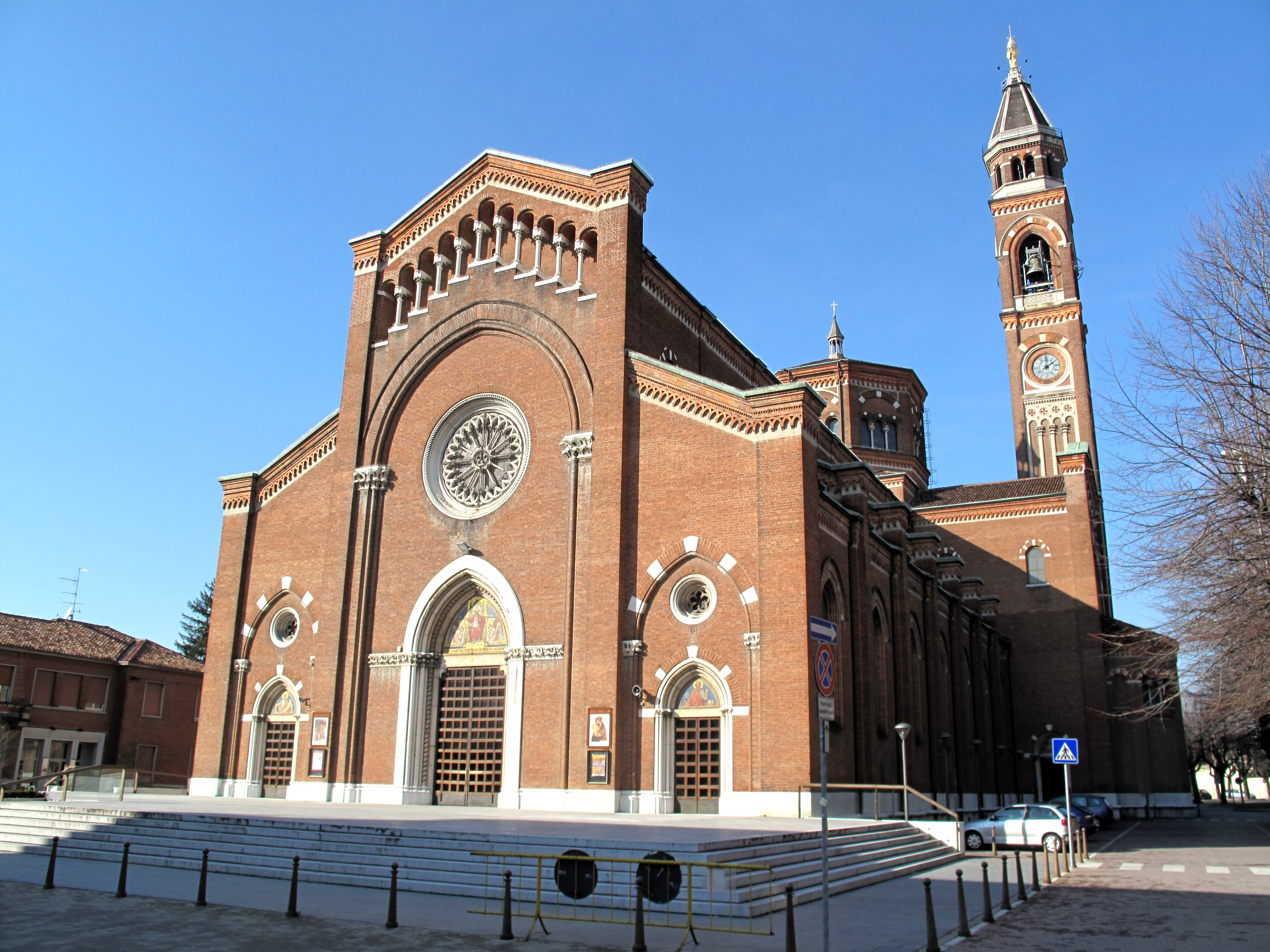
- Church of St. Peter and St. Paul, colloquially called the Duomo di Lissone

- Coat of arms
- Motto: Omnia vincit humilitas
- Location within Italy Location within Lombardy
- Coordinates: 45°37′N 9°15′E
- Country: Italy
- Region: Lombardy
- Province: Monza and Brianza (MB)
- Founded: Middle Ages
- Frazioni: Santa Margherita, Bareggia

Government
  - Mayor: Laura Borella

Area
  - Total: 9 km^{2} (3.5 sq mi)
- Elevation: 191 m (627 ft)

Population (December 31, 2017)
  - Total: 45,535
  - Density: 5,100/km^{2} (13,000/sq mi)
- Demonym: Lissonesi
- Time zone: UTC+1 (CET)
  - Summer (DST): UTC+2 (CEST)
- Postal code: 20851
- Dialing code: 039
- Patron saint: St. Peter and St. Paul
- Saint day: Monday after 3rd Sunday of October
- Website: Official website

Lissone (Brianzoeu: Lisson) is a town and comune (municipality) in the province of Monza and Brianza, Lombardy, Italy. It lies 18 kilometres (11 mi) north of Milan.

Lissone is bounded by the municipality of Vedano al Lambro, Monza, Muggiò, Desio, Seregno, Albiate, Sovico, Macherio and Biassono.

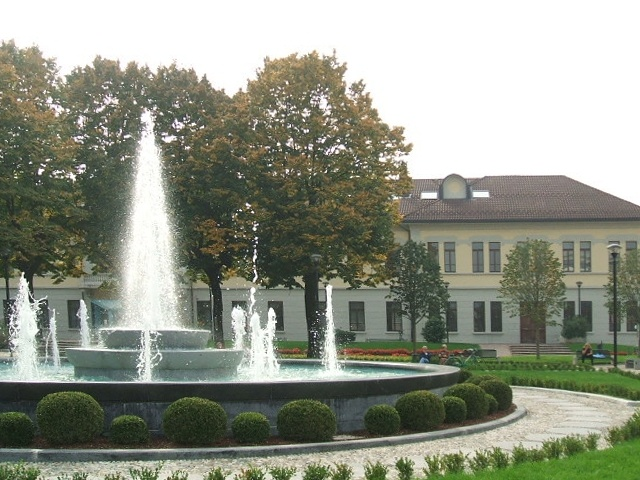
Piazza IV Novembre.

The city is served by the SS36- Highway of Lake of Como and Spluga and by the Milan–Chiasso railway line.

Lissone received the honorary title of city by a presidential decree on November 27, 1982.

Lissone is served by Lissone-Muggiò railway station.

== Sport ==
The two football clubs of Lissone are: -AC Lissone, that plays in Eccellenza Lombardy -Pro Lissone, that plays in Prima Categoria

== People ==
- Ugo Agostoni (1893–1941), road bicycle racer
- Guido Sala (1928–1987), Grand Prix motorcycle racer and world champion kart racer
- Pierantonio Tremolada (born 1956), bishop of Brescia
- Alberto Rivolta (1967–2019), footballer
- Federico Perego (born 1984), basketball assistant coach
- Simone Pontiggia (born 1993), footballer
- Matilde Villa (born 2004), WNBA player
