= Sergio Sala =

Italian footballer and climber

Sergio "Gigi" Sala (born 11 January 1958 in Casatenovo) is an Italian former semi-professional footballer and climber.

== Early life and education ==
Sergio Sala was born 11 January 1958 in Casatenovo.

== Career ==
Sala started his playing career at San Giorgio, a club based in Casatenovo. He played as a centre back (stopper).

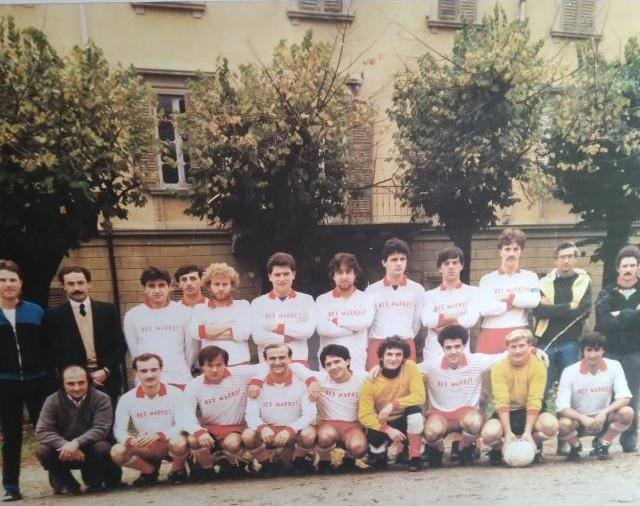
Sergio Sala's team. He is the second one from the right in the standing people.

In 1980, when he was 22, he was noticed and recruited by the club Associazione Sportiva Sant'Angelo. He played two seasons with them and then began to get noticed by bigger clubs such as Atalanta, A.C. Monza and Como. However, during one of his last matches with A.S. Sant'Angelo, he broke his meniscus, forcing him to retire from football.

== Climbing career ==
After Sala's retirement, he became a climber.

From 1984 to 2013 he was one of the alpine guides of the CAI of Barzanò.

He was the first person to reach the summit of the mount Resegone in 1985 and the summit of the Grigna in 1988. In both these occasions he reached the summit using only his hands and without any protections.

After these achievements he became very famous in the Brianza region.

== Personal life ==
He is one of the best friends of the singer Francesco Magni (1949–2021). He and Sergio Sala made a few songs together singing in the Brianzoeu dialect. The most famous one is "Polenta e buseca".
