= Usmate Velate =

Usmate Velate Oeus Velaa (Lombard)
- Comune
- Città di Usmate Velate
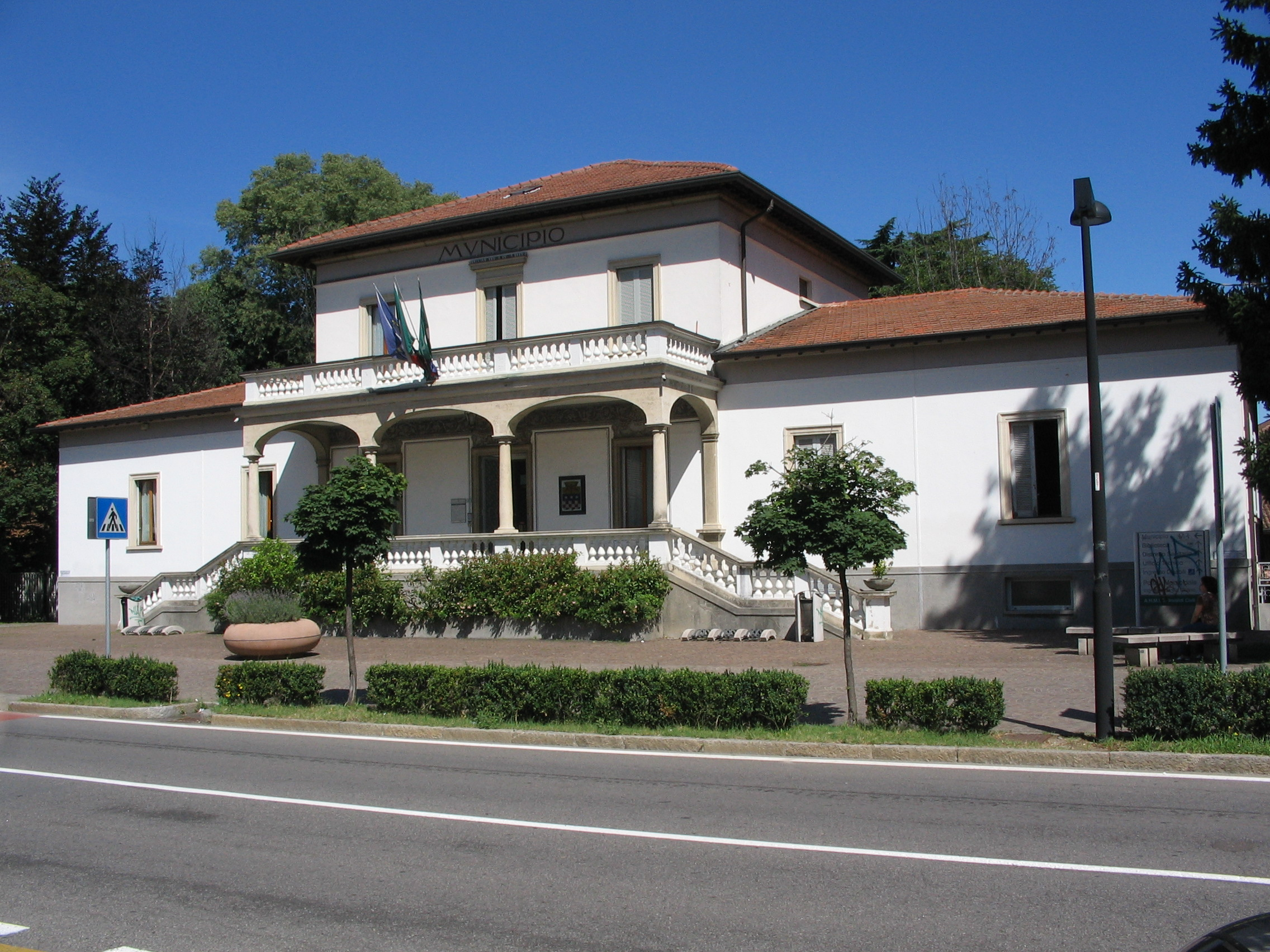
- Town Hall

- Coat of arms

- Location within Italy Location within Lombardy
- Coordinates: 45°39′N 9°21′E
- Country: Italy
- Region: Lombardy
- Province: Monza and Brianza (MB)
- Frazioni: Bettolino, Corrada, Dosso, Imparì, Mongorio, San Luigi, San Carlo

Government
  - Mayor: Lisa Mandelli

Area
  - Total: 10.0 km^{2} (3.9 sq mi)
- Elevation: 230 m (750 ft)

Population (31 December 2010)
  - Total: 10,019
  - Density: 1,000/km^{2} (2,590/sq mi)
- Demonym(s): Usmatesi, velatesi
- Time zone: UTC+1 (CET)
  - Summer (DST): UTC+2 (CEST)
- Postal code: 20865
- Dialing code: 039
- Website: Official website

Usmate Velate (Brianzoeu: Oeus Velaa) is a comune (municipality) in the Province of Monza and Brianza in the Italian region Lombardy, about 25 kilometres (16 mi) northeast of Milan.

Usmate Velate borders the following municipalities: Casatenovo, Lomagna, Camparada, Carnate, Arcore, Vimercate. It is served by Carnate-Usmate railway station.

Usmate Velate was once knows as Osio, reason for which its Lombard dialect name is Oeus.

== History ==
=== Usmate ===
In Roman times, the Via Spluga, a Roman road connecting Milan to Lindau via the Spluga Pass, passed through Usmate. Usmate was formerly called Uocimate, and before Vimercate became part of Martesana, it marked the southern boundary of the Brianza region. Dense woods extended from here, reaching Casate Vecchio on one side and Lomagna on the other.

Usmate had a church dedicated to Saint Zeno, but it was not established as a parish until 1571 when Saint Charles Borromeo made it independent from the Parish of Vimercate. After the Peace of Constance, disputes arose between Milanese nobles and commoners, leading the nobles to seek refuge in the Brianza region, where they held estates. Guidotto da Usmate, elected Consul, negotiated the Peace of Lecco in 1219, allowing the exiled nobles to return to Milan. By the beginning of the 14th century, Usmate's lands belonged to Bernabò Visconti, Lord of Milan, who often came here for hunting in the dense woods.

Usmate also saw battles, notably the one in February 1322 between the Ghibelline army, led by Marco Visconti, and the Guelphs, who eventually prevailed and entered Usmate, Vimercate, and later besieged Monza.

In later centuries, Usmate was sometimes referred to as "Osio" in the local dialect due to the Osio family, feudal lords of the area during the Spanish rule. Count Gian Paolo Osio was notorious for his crimes and his involvement with the Nun of Monza, mentioned by Alessandro Manzoni in The Betrothed. His castle in Usmate was destroyed in 1608 after suspicions that he was hiding there.

=== Velate ===
Velate was historically part of the County of Milan and was given to the Chapter of Monza by Berengar I in 920. In the 19th century, Count Rinaldo di Barbiano, Prince of Belgioioso d'Este, consolidated much of the agricultural lands of Velate and Usmate. He turned his residence in Velate into a summer retreat, complete with a private oratory and a large park. After his death, the property passed through the Giulini and Casati families.

In 1919, the villa, park, and several lands in Velate were sold to Maurizio Scaccabarozzi of Vimercate, who made it a permanent residence for his family.

Velate was given the addition Milanese by Royal Decree nº 1054 on 14 December 1862.

=== The Unification ===
The unification of Usmate and Velate dates back to 24 February 1869, when Usmate, which was already an autonomous municipality, was merged with Velate Milanese, changing its name to Usmate di Velate.

On 15 August 1930, Velate Milanese was authorized to transfer the municipal headquarters to Usmate di Velate, thus adopting the current name Usmate Velate.

=== Symbols ===
By municipal resolution on 20 September 1930, the then podestà Giuseppe Monfrini requested the granting of the coat of arms and the banner of the municipality, which was granted on 30 October 1954 by President Luigi Einaudi.

Tierced per fess: the first gold, a hammer flanked by two wings lowered, all in red; the second blue, three silver stars, arranged in fess; the third checkered silver and red, of three rows and six columns. Exterior decorations of the Municipality.

The coat of arms «evokes the ancient coats of arms of the wealthy and powerful families who resided in Usmate Velate» and consists of three sections or bands: from the top, a hammer between two wings in red on a gold background, symbols from the Ala and Ponzone families; three silver stars on blue, from the Osio family; and a checkered silver and red pattern, from the Barbiano di Belgioioso family.

The coat of arms is completed by the exterior decorations of the Municipality: a silver mural crown and two branches, one of oak and one of laurel.

The banner is a blue drape.
