= Villa Jacini a Zuccone Robasacco =

Villa in Triuggio, Italy

Coordinates: 45°40′02″N 9°17′25″E

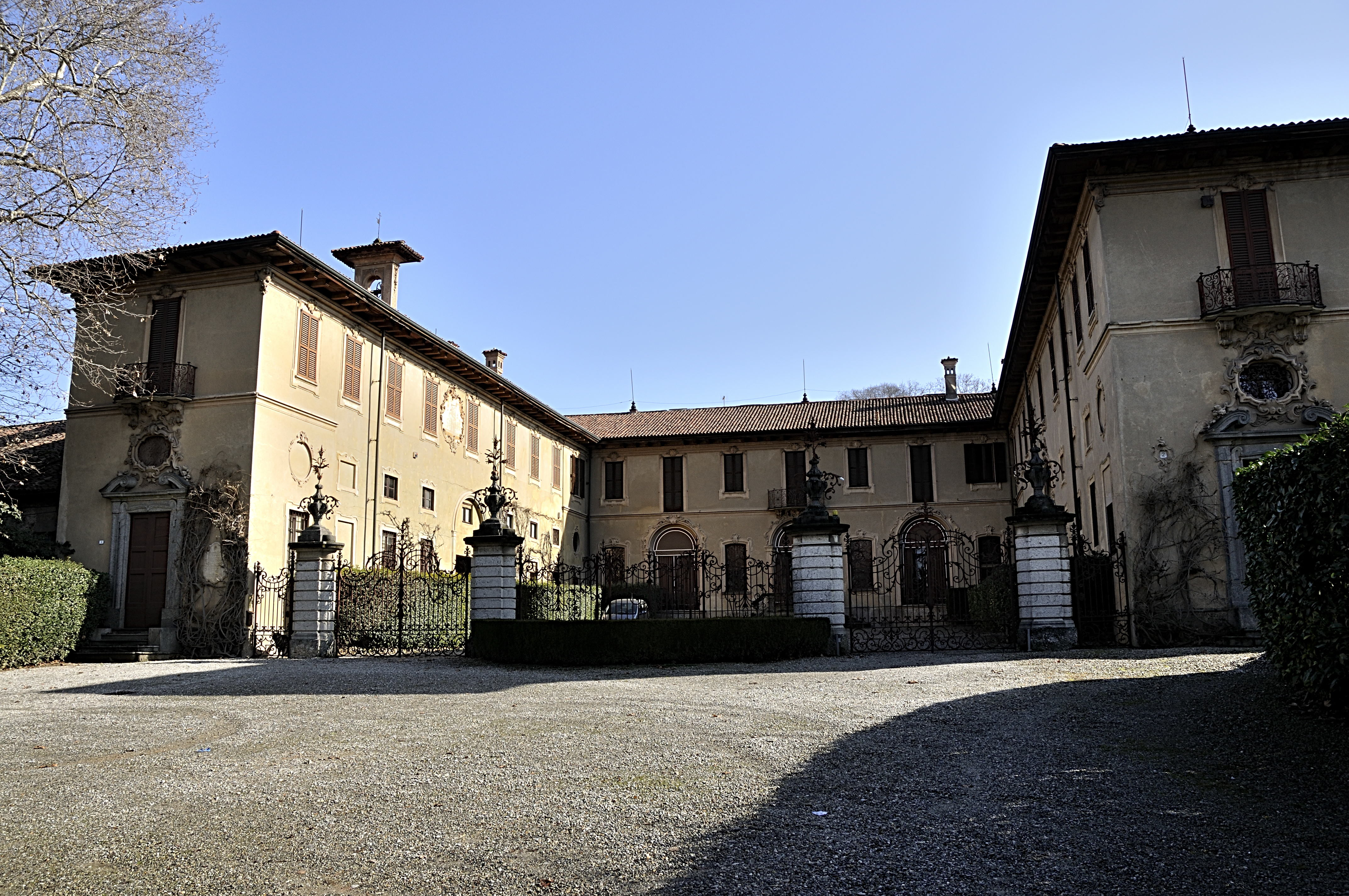
The facade of Villa Jacini in Tregasio

Villa Jacini is a large rural palace located on Via Conte Stefano Jacini the frazione of Zuccone Robasacco, within the town limits of Triuggio, Province of Monza and Brianza, region of Lombardy, Italy.

== History ==
The location has been notable since 1289 by the presence of a chapel or small church, still present on the property as the chapel of the Blessed Virgin Mary. Zuccone San Giovanni led to the construction of a rural palace lodge, later also known as Villa Sacro Cuore, Villa Zuccone Jacini, or Villa Zuccone Rubasacco.

A request to build an oratory at the site was made in 1571, by Battista Fedele to the archbishop of Milan, Carlo Borromeo. The property came into the hands of Cardinal Angelo Maria Durini (1725-1796) who used the property as a hunting lodge.

The land then became the property of Michele Bussi, a merchant from Milan, who was the great-grandfather of Countess Carolina Jacini, widow of Cavi. The family commissioned a refurbishment of the property by the architect Marquis Antonio Citterio (1853-1936), pupil of Camillo Boito. He designed two advancing wings and more theatrical facades with statues and gardens. Decorative door and window frames, twirling chimneys, and wrought-iron balconies give the small property an air of elegance. The entrance is through a bifurcated staircase.

The interiors were decorated in the late 19th-century with trompe-l'oeil and stucco. Photographs from the 19th-century document show sumptuous decoration and artwork with carved wooden ceilings in the main salon. A Palazzo Jacini is located in Casalbuttano in the province of Cremona.

The property and surrounding park is in private hands.
