= Camparada =

- Comune
- Comune di Camparada
- Coat of arms

- Location within Italy Location within Lombardy
- Coordinates: 45°39′N 9°19′E
- Country: Italy
- Region: Lombardy
- Province: Monza and Brianza (MB)

Government
  - Mayor: Giuliana Carniel

Area
  - Total: 1.6 km^{2} (0.62 sq mi)

Population (Dec. 2004)
  - Total: 1,889
  - Density: 1,200/km^{2} (3,100/sq mi)
- Time zone: UTC+1 (CET)
  - Summer (DST): UTC+2 (CEST)
- Postal code: 20857
- Dialing code: 039
- Patron saint: St. Roch
- Website: Official website

Camparada is a comune (municipality) in the Province of Monza and Brianza in the Italian region Lombardy, located about 25 kilometres (16 mi) northeast of Milan.

Camparada borders the following municipalities: Casatenovo, Usmate Velate, Lesmo, Arcore.
