= Casatenovo =

Casatenovo Casanööf (Lombard)
- Comune
- Comune di Casatenovo
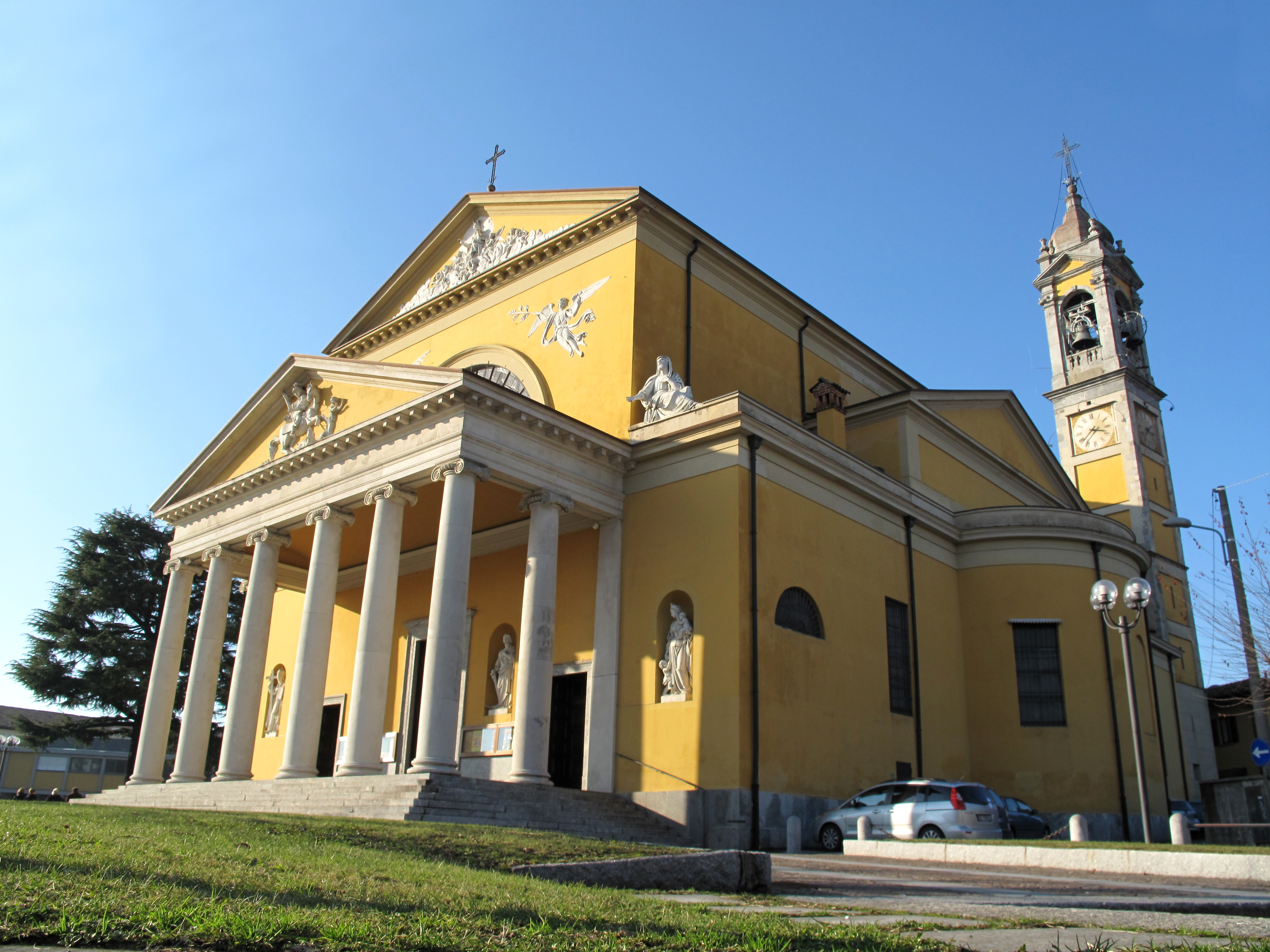

- Coat of arms

- Location within Italy Location within Lombardy
- Coordinates: 45°42′N 9°19′E
- Country: Italy
- Region: Lombardy
- Province: Lecco (LC)
- Frazioni: Galgiana, Campofiorenzo, Cascina Bracchi, Valaperta, Rogoredo, Rimoldo

Government
  - Mayor: Filippo Galbiati

Area
  - Total: 12.7 km^{2} (4.9 sq mi)
- Elevation: 365 m (1,198 ft)

Population (30 April 2011)
  - Total: 12,700
  - Density: 1,000/km^{2} (2,590/sq mi)
- Demonym: Casatesi
- Time zone: UTC+1 (CET)
  - Summer (DST): UTC+2 (CEST)
- Postal code: 23880
- Dialing code: 039
- Patron saint: St. George
- Saint day: 23 April
- Website: Official website

Casatenovo (Brianzöö: Casanööf) is a comune (municipality) in the Province of Lecco in the Italian region of Lombardy, about 30 kilometres (19 mi) northeast of Milan and about 20 kilometres (12 mi) southwest of Lecco. As of 2011, it had a population of about 12,700.

Casatenovo borders the following municipalities: Besana in Brianza, Camparada, Correzzana, Lesmo, Lomagna, Missaglia, Monticello Brianza, Usmate Velate.

== History ==
First mentioned in 867 AD, the village probably developed starting from the late 10th to early 11th centuries around the castle of the Casati family.

Casatenovo took advantage of the economic and industrial boom of the Brianza area starting from the 19th century. It is now an important and rich center in the food production sector, including companies as Galbusera and Vismara.

== Main sights ==
- Parish church of San Giorgio. It was established in the 13th century, but its current appearance dates from 1635.
- Church of Santa Margherita, rebuilt in 1462. It houses frescoes in late-Gothic Lombard style.
- The small church of Santa Giustina, known from 1062. The bell tower is in Romanesque style. Much of the current edifice belongs to a restoration held in 1643; it includes a fresco cycle with the Virgin and Child with Saints, and another with God and the Fathers of the Church.
- Villa Casati-Facchi.
- Villa Casati-Greppi (1775).
- Villa Lurani-Cernuschi, most likely located where once the castle was.
- Cascina Rancate, a countryside villa dating from the 14th century, restored in the 16th century and including an oratory of St. Anthony.

== Notable people ==
- Sergio Sala (1958), singer-songwriter and football player.

== Demographic evolution ==
Historical population

Year	Pop.	±%
1861	3,469	—
1871	3,747	+8.0%
1881	3,870	+3.3%
1901	4,902	+26.7%
1911	5,348	+9.1%

Year	Pop.	±%
1921	5,543	+3.6%
1931	5,181	−6.5%
1936	5,259	+1.5%
1951	6,004	+14.2%
1961	7,314	+21.8%

Year	Pop.	±%
1971	8,518	+16.5%
1981	10,364	+21.7%
1991	10,725	+3.5%
2001	11,884	+10.8%

Source: Data from ISTAT
