= Triuggio =

- Comune
- Comune di Triuggio
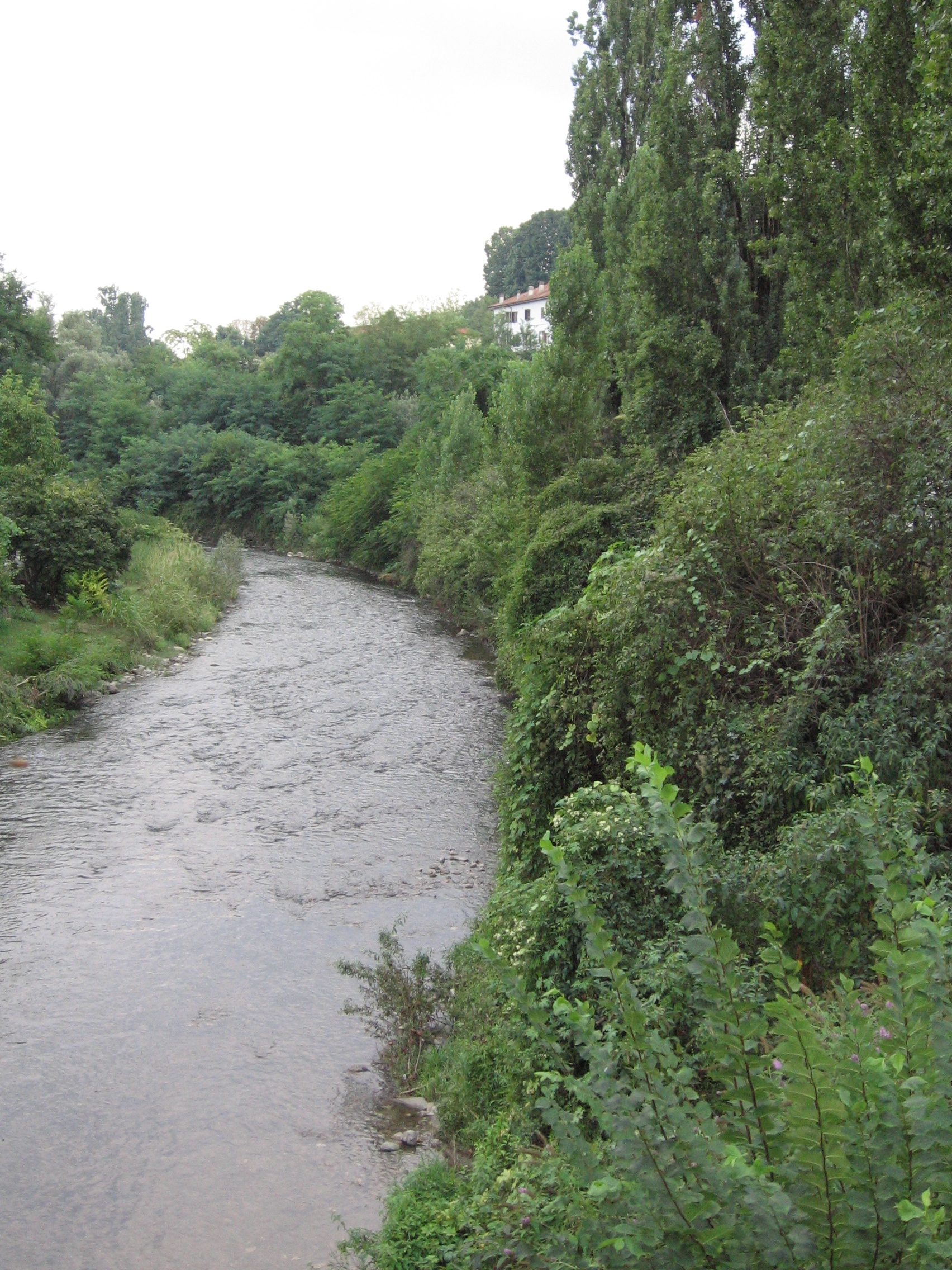
- Lambro River at Triuggio.

- Coat of arms

- Location within Italy Location within Lombardy
- Coordinates: 45°40′N 9°16′E
- Country: Italy
- Region: Lombardy
- Province: Monza and Brianza (MB)
- Frazioni: Canonica Lambro, Montemerlo, Ponte, Rancate, Tregasio

Government
  - Mayor: Pietro Giovanni Maria Cicardi

Area
  - Total: 8.38 km^{2} (3.24 sq mi)
- Elevation: 231 m (758 ft)

Population (30 November 2016)
  - Total: 8,868
  - Density: 1,060/km^{2} (2,740/sq mi)
- Time zone: UTC+1 (CET)
  - Summer (DST): UTC+2 (CEST)
- Postal code: 20844
- Dialing code: 0362
- Patron saint: Santa Maria della Neve
- Saint day: 5 August
- Website: Official website

Triuggio is a comune (municipality) in the Province of Monza and Brianza in the Italian region Lombardy, located about 25 kilometres (16 mi) northeast of Milan. It contains the Villa Jacini a Zuccone Robasacco, a cultural heritage site in private ownership.
