= Memorario =

Memorario is the commercial name given to the regional railway system of Tuscany, operated by Trenitalia since 2004 and based on a clock-face scheduling.

It consists of three types of train: fast trains (veloci), half-fast trains (semiveloci) and metropolitan trains (metropolitani).

== Network ==
Memorario operates numerous regional lines and continues to expand.

Metropolitan trains (Treni metropolitani)

Colour	Route	Frequency
x	Empoli – Firenze Porta al Prato	30 min
x	Pistoia – Firenze Santa Maria Novella	60 min
x	Prato Centrale – Montevarchi-Terranuova	60 min
x	Pisa Centrale – Firenze Santa Maria Novella	60 min
x	Empoli – Siena	60 min
x	La Spezia Centrale – Pisa Centrale	60 min
x	Parma – Pontremoli	120 min
x	Pontremoli – La Spezia Centrale	120 min
x	Borgo San Lorenzo – Pontassieve	non cadenzato

Semi-fast trains (Treni semiveloci)

Colour	Route	Frequency
x	Firenze Santa Maria Novella – Pisa Centrale – Sarzana – La Spezia Centrale/Pontremoli	60 min
x	Firenze Santa Maria Novella – Lucca	60 min
x	Firenze Santa Maria Novella – Arezzo	60 min
x	Firenze Santa Maria Novella – Pontassieve – Borgo San Lorenzo	60 min

Fast trains (Treni veloci)

Colore	Route	Frequency
x	Firenze Santa Maria Novella – Pisa Centrale – Livorno Centrale	60 min
x	Firenze Santa Maria Novella – Lucca – Viareggio	60 min
x	Firenze Santa Maria Novella – Siena	60 min
x	Firenze Santa Maria Novella – Terontola-Cortona – Roma Termini/Foligno	60 min
x	Firenze Santa Maria Novella – Borgo San Lorenzo (– Faenza)	60 min
