= Boschetto di Rogoredo =

Italian green area near Milan where people consume drugs

Environmental degradation in Gino Cassinis Park in 2024, in a green area close to the Boschetto di Rogoredo.

The Boschetto di Rogoredo (literally, Rogoredo Grove) is the common name of a green area on the southeastern outskirts of Milan, Italy, within the Porto di Mare area near Milano Rogoredo railway station. From the mid-2010s, it became one of the largest open drug scenes in Northern Italy, where drugs were openly sold and consumed. The market was characterised primarily by the sale and use of heroin and cocaine at particularly low prices, attracting visitors not only from Milan and the surrounding area but also from other regions of northern Italy.

The original grove covered approximately three hectares within Porto di Mare park. Drug dealing and consumption, however, also spread to areas around the railway station and along the tracks. The area's deteriorating conditions prompted environmental restoration, policing and health and social-care initiatives in the second half of the 2010s. These measures partially restored public access to the green space, but did not eliminate the drug market, which fragmented and shifted along the railway towards San Donato Milanese and other municipalities southeast of Milan.

== Location and geographical setting ==
The Boschetto di Rogoredo lies within the Porto di Mare green space on Milan's southeastern outskirts, near Milano Rogoredo railway station and Gino Cassinis Park. It forms part of a network of green spaces partly bounded by railway lines and roads, which have shaped access to the area and its relationship with surrounding neighbourhoods.

The term boschetto (small wood or grove) does not denote an administrative area with formally defined boundaries. The original wooded core must be distinguished from the larger area affected by drug dealing and use, whose extent has changed repeatedly over time. For example, in December 2017 law-enforcement operations focused on the woodland between Via Sant'Arialdo, Via San Dionigi and Via Fabio Massimo, as well as the section of Via Orwell beside the railway embankment.

The green space entrusted by the Municipality of Milan to Italia Nostra for restoration from 2017 is a much larger portion of Porto di Mare, extending between Via Sant'Arialdo and Via San Dionigi and covering more than 650,000 square metres. It includes the grove itself.

== History ==
=== Territorial background and origins ===
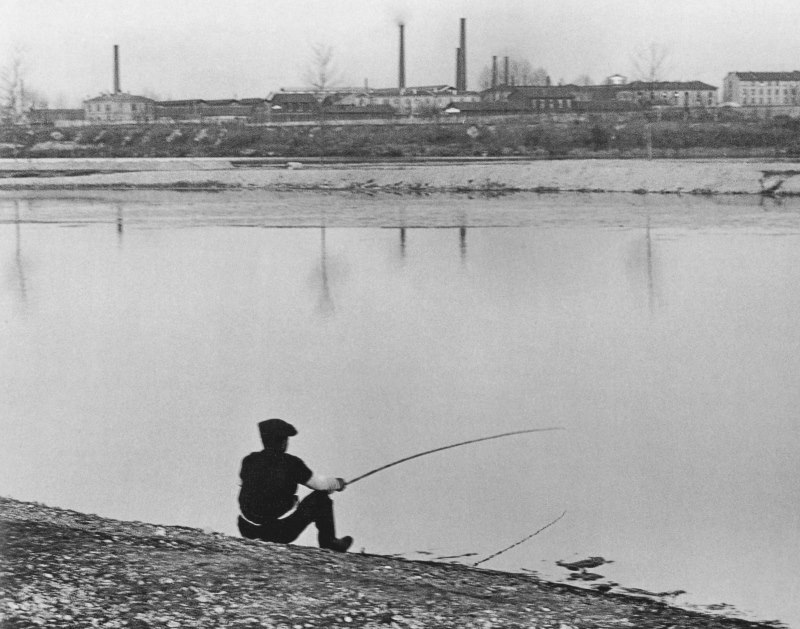
One of the artificial basins at Porto di Mare in the 1930s.

The Porto di Mare area in southern Milan acquired its present form through numerous twentieth-century alterations and unfinished development schemes. One was a 1917 plan for a port intended to replace the Darsena di Porta Ticinese as the terminus for river traffic on the proposed Milan–Cremona–Po waterway. The project was never completed. Groundwater filled the excavations, creating basins used by residents of Rogoredo for swimming and fishing. After the Second World War, the site was used to dump rubble from bombed buildings and became a location for unauthorised occupation and settlements. During the 1970s, the basins were drained to restore green space, although part of the land continued to serve as a rubbish dump until the following decade, when waste was covered over and the first efforts were made to establish a park. The area remained largely isolated and was poorly maintained, but acquired considerable ecological diversity, with dense tree cover and wildlife characteristic of lowland habitats. As vegetation spread over the decades, it formed a large, unfenced green space separated from more heavily used parts of Milan by the railway and the ring road towards Chiaravalle.

The first reports of neglect and other problems in the area date to 2004, while the first drug-related offences were reported to the police in 2007. The year 2008 is regarded as a turning point: the introduction of a branch of the Milan suburban railway service at Rogoredo made the site readily accessible from Milan, its metropolitan hinterland and nearby regions. The first substantial drug-dealing activity inside an abandoned building was also reported that year. By 2013, the flow of people heading for the grove's drug-selling areas had become conspicuous.

Porto di Mare's isolation provided shelter and reduced public exposure for drug sales and consumption, due in part to the green space's neglected condition, while the railway and M3 metro line made it easy to reach. The relatively low prices of drugs sold there were an additional attraction. These factors, together with the urban transformations associated with Expo 2015 in Milan, contributed to the relocation and concentration of previously dispersed drug markets and consumption sites in the grove. Dealers and their customers were displaced from central areas towards the urban periphery by police interventions.

=== Expansion during the 2010s ===
By the mid-2010s, illegal drug-related activity sheltered by the grove had grown to such an extent that it was considered one of the principal open drug markets and consumption sites in Northern Italy. From 2015, it took the form of a large, concentrated open drug scene, with highly visible sales and consumption. Estimates suggest that between 600 and 700 customers visited daily in 2017–2018. A journalistic investigation in 2019 regarded at least 500 daily visitors as a reasonable estimate, while acknowledging that precise counts were not possible.

Visitors were not limited to the Milan area. Easy transport connections encouraged people to commute to purchase drugs from Varese, Piacenza, Bergamo, Novara and Alessandria. The people using the area varied considerably in age and social circumstances: they included long-term drug users, young people, individuals experiencing social difficulties or homelessness, and others without readily apparent housing or employment problems. Prostitution was also reported in the area.

From 2014, partly because the situation had become more visible, residents of Rogoredo and Santa Giulia began calling for institutional action. Over the following years, neighbourhood demonstrations were held both outside the station and near the grove. The issues were raised in parliamentary questions and meetings involving the municipal administration, the prefecture and the Ministry of the Interior. Increased press coverage also helped associate Rogoredo in the public imagination with open drug use, contributing to the stigmatisation of the neighbourhood.

=== Restoration measures, the COVID-19 pandemic and the displacement of the open drug scene ===
An improvised shelter beneath an electricity pylon between Via Sant'Arialdo and the railway tracks between Rogoredo and Poasco, used by some drug users to escape the intense heat in June 2026.

From 2017, Italia Nostra began restoration and redevelopment work in the grove and the wider Porto di Mare area. Together with law-enforcement action, these initiatives had begun to fragment the established drug scene even before March 2020. During the COVID-19 pandemic and in subsequent years, dealing and consumption became more mobile, with selling locations frequently shifting between different sites. Drug use and dealing became less visible, but also more difficult for harm reduction services to reach. In 2022, the local healthcare outreach service recorded approximately 60–70 daily contacts, down from more than 100 in previous years. It also reported emerging dealing sites in Ponte Lambro, including Parco Vittorini, as well as in Corvetto and San Donato Milanese.

By 2024, the main concentrations of dealing had moved outside the original grove, with one located along the railway tracks near Via Sant'Arialdo and another in San Donato Milanese, beneath a motorway interchange connecting to the A1 motorway. The restoration of the grove had therefore not eliminated the drug trade but displaced it towards more marginal and peripheral locations.

By 2026, press reports distinguished the largely restored original grove from drug-dealing sites in neighbouring green spaces alongside the railway, which had extended at different times towards San Donato Milanese, San Giuliano Milanese and Melegnano. A February 2026 investigation by Il manifesto estimated that around 400–500 people were still visiting drug-selling sites each day, compared with 500–800 during the scene's peak period.

== Characteristics of drug dealing and consumption ==
Several people visiting the grove have been killed by trains while crossing the tracks unsafely.

The drugs most commonly sold and used in the grove were heroin, chiefly injected but sometimes inhaled, and cocaine, which was injected or snorted. Crack cocaine, cannabis, methadone, benzodiazepines and alcohol were also available. In 2017–2018, heroin sold for approximately €20 per gram and could be bought in quantities as small as one-tenth of a gram, known locally as a punto (point), for as little as €2. Cocaine cost around €70 per gram and was also available in individual doses costing only a few euros. Prices below those of other drug markets in the area, and the practice of selling very small quantities, were major factors attracting customers to the grove.

The dealing operation employed sellers and lookouts and was spread over several locations, some used for sales and others for consumption, a division facilitated by the local terrain. Vegetation, small rises in the ground and railway infrastructure helped dealers monitor approaches and provided numerous escape routes during police interventions. People moved in and out throughout the night. Visitors also travelled daily to other parts of the city to obtain money for drugs, particularly Milano Centrale railway station, Milano Porta Garibaldi railway station and the city centre, where they engaged in informal activities such as juggling and begging. An informal economy also developed around the scene, including the resale of syringes and methadone and, in some cases, intermediaries who provided sexual services or acted as lookouts in exchange for drugs.

The organised nature of drug dealing in the grove also emerged from an investigation launched by the public-security police station on Via Mecenate. In December 2018 investigators established that two separate criminal organisations had long controlled the selling area between Via Orwell and Via Sant'Arialdo. One organisation directly controlled at least three selling points: one on Via Sant'Arialdo, one in a tunnel beneath the ring road on Via Impastato, and one near a farmhouse in the woodland. At the latter site, an appointed criminal intermediary regulated relations between buyers and dealers. Investigators reconstructed the division of responsibilities within the group, from drug distribution to retail sales and control of selling locations. In June 2021 the investigation led to the arrest of ten people on charges of criminal association for the purpose of drug trafficking. At least one robbery at a bank in Lodi was also linked to the group, as a means of financing its operations.

In addition to drug dealing, forms of transactional sex developed in and around the grove. In some cases, sexual services were exchanged for money to buy drugs; in others, they were exchanged directly for substances. Reports included the involvement of very young people.

The high level of drug consumption and misuse also entailed serious health risks, including overdoses—at least 14 people died from overdoses between 2017 and 2024—and dangers associated with the site's proximity to the railway and the repeated crossing of tracks by buyers and dealers.

== Relations with the surrounding neighbourhood ==
The daily presence of an open drug market increased residents' sense of insecurity in Rogoredo, particularly at night and in the evening around the station and nearby parks. Sources of concern included discarded hypodermic needles, visible drug use and the condition of users in public spaces, as well as incidents of petty crime and frequent medical emergencies. Other factors associated with residents' insecurity included witnessing drug dealing, antisocial behaviour among visitors to the grove and fear of becoming victims of crime.

Sociological analyses have emphasised the role of the area's layout: the railway, road infrastructure and layers of urban development helped produce two socially distinct spaces, one used by residents of Rogoredo and Santa Giulia and the other by visitors to the grove. The appearance of drug users in Via Sant'Arialdo and Via Orwell, closer to the established residential areas, then alarmed local residents and contributed to their mobilisation. That mobilisation drew the attention of local and national media and political institutions, helping frame the grove as a public issue associated with urban decay, insecurity and threats to public order.

Relations between visitors to the grove and Rogoredo residents were not exclusively confrontational. Informal forms of assistance developed alongside everyday interactions with station workers, shopkeepers and local social workers. The physical separation of the residential area from the main consumption sites also fostered a degree of tolerance towards the drug scene. Nevertheless, residents found the media's strong association of Rogoredo with the grove unpleasant, as they felt their neighbourhood had become identified with its deteriorated conditions.

== Policing, social services and redevelopment ==
=== Policing and assistance ===
The Via Orwell underpass, one of the areas surrounding the grove affected by drug use.

The initial institutional response consisted almost entirely of police raids and checks carried out at regular intervals. These measures had only temporary effects, however, as sellers and users routinely returned once police operations ended.

Physical changes to the area were subsequently introduced alongside police operations. In 2018, the railways erected a barrier approximately four metres high near the station to prevent people crossing the tracks. The Via Orwell area was also gradually enclosed, pushing some dealing and consumption towards other parts of the grove and along Via Sant'Arialdo. Gates and access points were reinforced. Some public drinking fountains were turned off, prompting drug users to enter the underground metro station to draw water from an emergency fire hydrant for basic needs. Surveillance cameras were installed and cleaning schedules for the metro underpass were reorganised to make the area easier to monitor and to disperse dealing and consumption sites. In subsequent years, law-enforcement presence was further strengthened and exclusion measures, including locally described mini-DASPO orders and compulsory departure notices, were issued. In 2024 the area was designated a zona rossa (special policing zone).

Access from Via George Orwell in Rogoredo towards the railway tracks to San Donato Milanese and the A1–A51 motorway interchanges.

Alongside these measures, several harm-reduction services operated in the area, particularly the outreach unit of Cooperativa Lotta contro l'Emarginazione, the Italian Red Cross and volunteer groups. Their staff approached people who used drugs and offered sterile medical supplies, needle-and-syringe exchange programmes, emergency assistance and referrals to health and social-care services. An ethnographic study undertaken as part of the Principi attivi di salute project reported that the outreach unit at Rogoredo station, run by the Miramare drop-in cooperative, occasionally connected the two services, establishing contact with people who might otherwise have remained isolated. These activities made Rogoredo a case illustrating the need to complement policing with social networks, healthcare services and harm-reduction strategies.

In 2019, a redevelopment plan was launched for the green space, combining health assistance for people with addictions and action against dealing. By the end of the year, the number of people present had fallen sharply, partly owing to intensive enforcement against one drug-selling group. In 2020, restrictions associated with the COVID-19 pandemic further altered and dispersed the geography of dealing in the grove. This process had already begun before March 2020 through the combination of environmental restoration and law-enforcement measures. It made drug users and traces of their presence, such as syringes and aluminium foil, less visible, while complicating the work of risk-reduction services.

=== Environmental restoration ===
In 2017, management of the park was entrusted to Italia Nostra, which began restoration work.

Major restoration efforts followed an agreement signed on 4 October 2017 between the Municipality of Milan and the Italia Nostra Onlus Urban Forestry Centre, pursuant to a municipal executive resolution adopted on 28 July of that year. The agreement entrusted the organisation with managing the Porto di Mare green space, approximately 65 hectares of parkland including the three-hectare grove, with the aim of restoring, cleaning, protecting and maintaining its natural environment. Work included removing waste, pruning trees and controlling invasive vegetation, making the site more accessible to both the public and law-enforcement officers.

In a year and a half, more than 300 tonnes of waste and rubble were removed. By the early 2020s, the area was again hosting school and sporting activities, volunteer days, guided visits, wildlife surveys and public events, including Piano City and Green Week initiatives, as well as other recreational uses.

The grove's regeneration project was completed in November 2022. In December of that year, the Municipality of Milan approved a new seven-year management agreement covering 2023–2029 and an area of more than 650,000 square metres between Via Sant'Arialdo and Via San Dionigi. The decision was intended to maintain the improvements made in previous years while supporting further projects, including pedestrian and cycling paths and cultural initiatives.

The grove's restoration became part of the wider transformation of the Rogoredo–Santa Giulia district associated with the 2026 Winter Olympics and other urban-regeneration projects in southeastern Milan. The interventions have been interpreted in relation to agroecology and agroforestry projects already undertaken in nearby Parco della Vettabbia. The restoration and wider transformation of Porto di Mare and Corvetto have also been analysed as a process of green gentrification, linked both to the Milan–Cortina Olympic developments and to the area's increasing attractiveness to property investors.

== Bibliography ==
- Bergamo, Sonia (2025). Oltre lo spettacolo della siringa. Contromappa di una scena aperta del consumo di droghe del XXI secolo (in Italian). Meltemi. ISBN 9791256151615.
- Baiocco, Ruben; Buonsante, Antonio (2025). "Milano senza un fuori". In Tedesco, Carla; Castigliano, Marica (eds.). Mondializzazione e riconfigurazione di territori (PDF) (in Italian). Vol. 3. Planum Publisher e Società Italiana degli Urbanisti. ISBN 9788899237721. Archived from the original (PDF) on 3 September 2026.
- Bergamo, Sonia; Briones, María de los Ángeles; Mauri, Francesca (2023). "Displaced. The Denial of Public Space and Everyday Resistance in Milan". In Germes, Mélina; Klaus, Luise; Höhne, Stefan (eds.). Narcotic Cities: Counter-Cartographies of Drugs and Spaces (PDF). JOVIS. doi:10.1515/9783986120184-024. Archived from the original on 3 September 2026.
- Bergamo, Sonia; Petrilli, Enrico (2022). "La pandemia da Covid-19 a "dROGOREDO"". In Nuvolati, Giampaolo; Bernardi, Monica; Bottini, Luca (eds.). Urbana 2021. La città riparte dopo lo shock (PDF) (in Italian). Fondazione Giangiacomo Feltrinelli. ISBN 9788868354480. Archived from the original on 3 September 2026.
- Lucchini, Alfio (2019). "Oltre il "Boschetto di Rogoredo"" (PDF). Mission. Italian Quarterly Journal of Addiction (in Italian) (51). Archived from the original (PDF) on 23 April 2026.
- Petrilli, Enrico; Bergamo, Sonia (2025). "Problemi sociali più-che-umani: significati e materialità nel governo delle scene aperte del consumo di droghe" (PDF). Rivista di Criminologia, Vittimologia e Sicurezza (in Italian). 19: 132–143. doi:10.14664/rcvs/274. Archived from the original (PDF) on 3 September 2026.
- Raccanelli, Laura (2024). "Addomesticare la wilderness. Nature tossiche e green gentrification a Corvetto, Milano" (PDF). Palaver (in Italian). 13 (2). doi:10.1285/i22804250v13i2p117. Archived from the original (PDF) on 19 October 2025.
- Severi, Ivan (2019). Principi attivi di salute (PAS) - Report della ricerca etnografica all'interno di sei servizi territoriali di riduzione del danno (PDF) (Report) (in Italian). CNCA - Coordinamento nazionale comunità accoglienti. Archived from the original (PDF) on 16 October 2021.
- Stefanizzi, Sonia; Verdolini, Valeria (2019). "Bordered communities: the perception of insecurity in five European cities" (PDF). Quality & Quantity. 53 (3): 1165–1186. doi:10.1007/s11135-018-0810-x. Archived from the original on 3 September 2026.
- Stefanizzi, Sonia; Verdolini, Valeria (2022). "A "space" of one's own: identity and conflict in two Milan districts" (PDF). Quality & Quantity. 56 (1): 109–130. doi:10.1007/s11135-021-01112-y. Archived from the original (PDF) on 3 September 2026.
