= Milano Bruzzano railway station =

Surface railway station in Milan, Italy

Milano Bruzzano
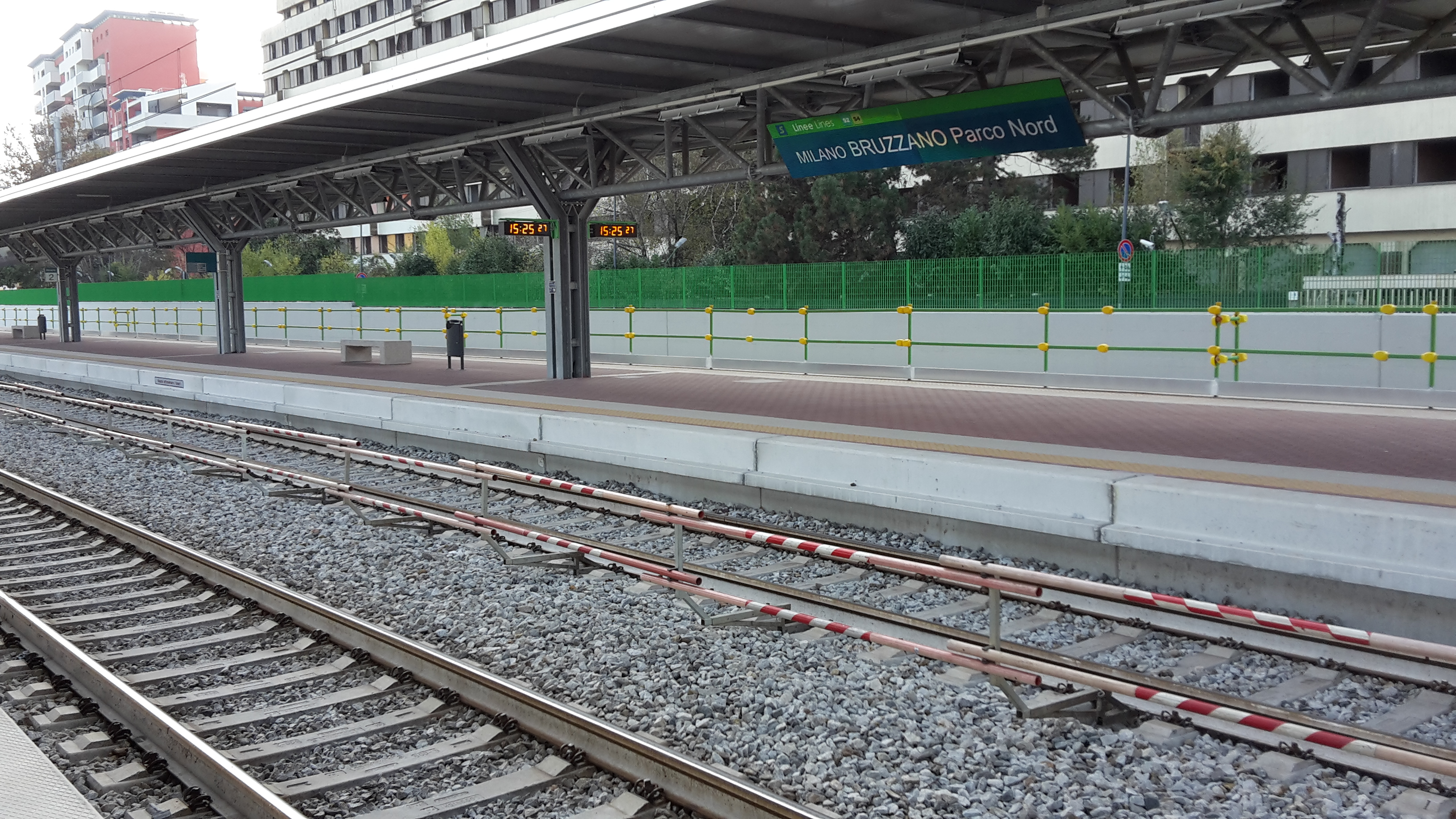

General information
- Location: Bruzzano, Milan; Italy
- Coordinates: 45°31′51″N 09°10′20″E
- Owner: Ferrovienord
- Operator: Trenord
- Line: Milan–Asso
- Distance: 7.7 km (4.8 mi) from Milan Cadorna
- Platforms: 2
- Tracks: 3

Other information
- Fare zone: STIBM: Mi1

History
- Opened: 16 July 1879; 147 years ago
- Rebuilt: 24 October 2014; 11 years ago
- Electrified: May 1929

Services
Preceding station	Trenord	Following station
Cormano–Cusano Milanino towards Mariano Comense	Line S2 (Milan suburban railway service)	Milano Affori towards Milano Rogoredo
Cormano–Cusano Milanino towards Camnago–Lentate	Line S4 (Milan suburban railway service)	Milano Affori towards Milano Cadorna
Cormano–Cusano Milanino Terminus	Line S12 (Milan suburban railway service)	Milano Affori towards Melegnano
Location
- Location within Milan Location within Lombardy Location within Northern Italy Location within Italy

Milano Bruzzano is a surface railway station in the Bruzzano district in Milan, Italy.

The line was opened in 1879 as part of the Milan–Asso railway, and is now managed by Ferrovienord. It is the last station in Milan municipality on this line. The station is in the Parco Nord (Northern Park) of Milan.

== Services ==
Milano Bruzzano is served by lines S2, S4 and S12 of the Milan suburban railway service, operated by the Lombard railway company Trenord.

== Old station ==
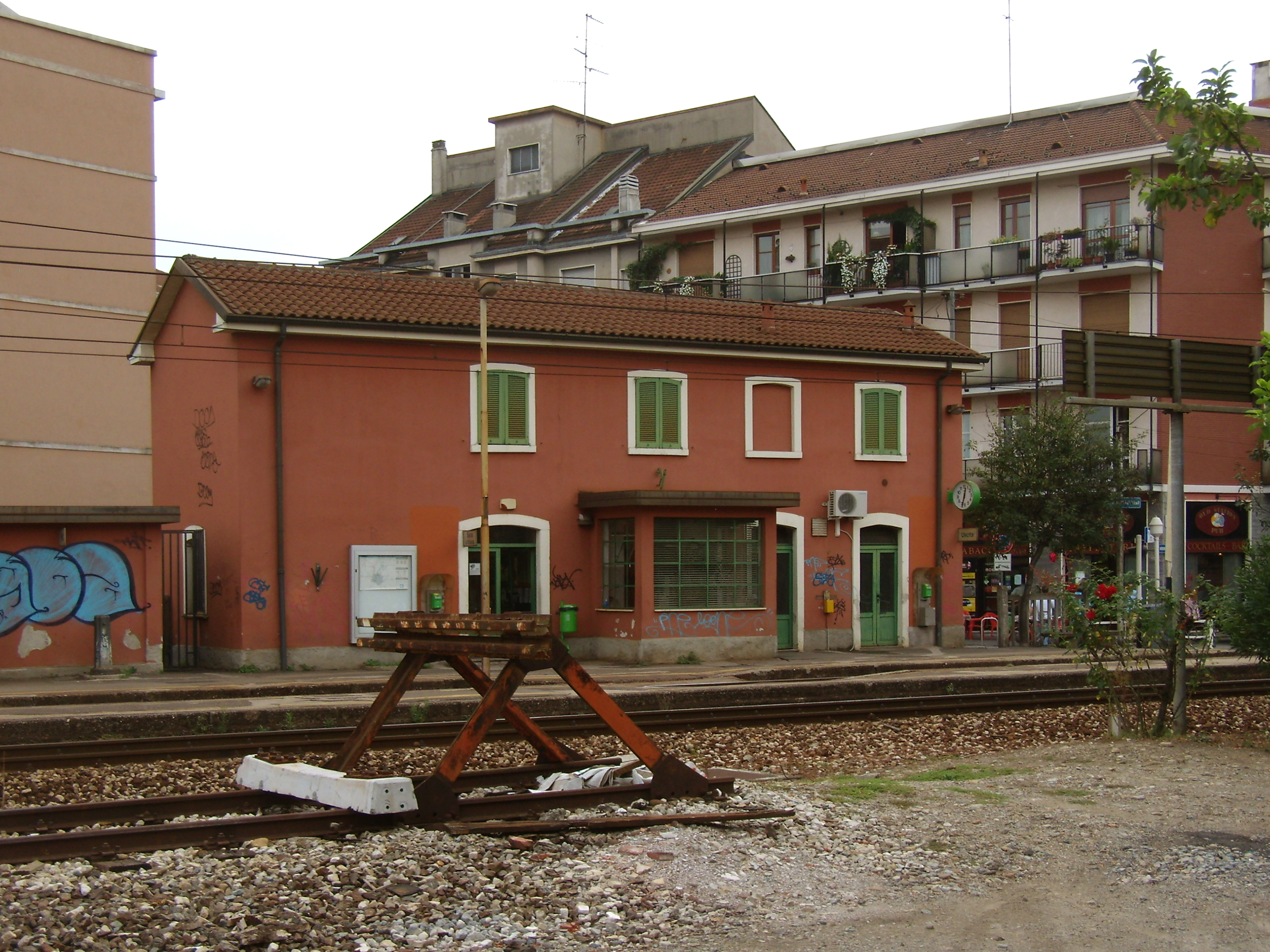

The old Bruzzano station, built in 1879 as part of the original line, was located to the south of the current station.

== See also ==
- Railway stations in Milan
- Milan suburban railway service
