= Fidenza railway station =

Railway station in Fidenza, Italy

Fidenza
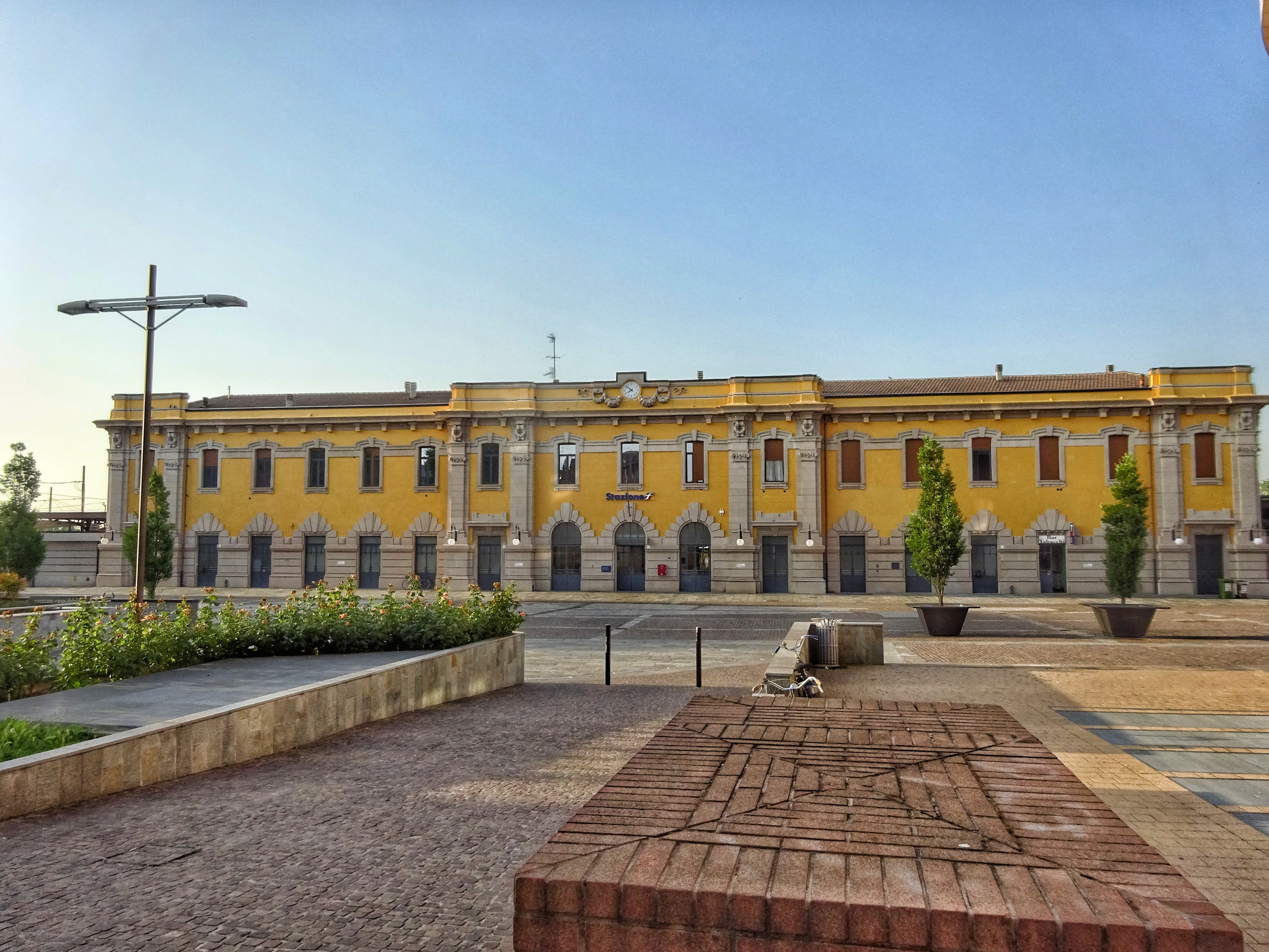
- The passenger building and station forecourt after significant redevelopment (2019).

General information
- Location: Fidenza, Parma, Emilia-Romagna
- Coordinates: 44°52′03″N 10°03′48″E
- Operator: Rete Ferroviaria Italiana
- Lines: Milan–Bologna; Cremona–Fidenza; Fidenza–Fornovo; Fidenza–Salsomaggiore
- Platforms: 8
- Train operators: Trenitalia

Other information
- Classification: Silver

History
- Opened: 21 July 1859; 167 years ago
- Electrified: 1938; 88 years ago

Services
| Preceding station | Trenitalia | Following station |
|---|---|---|
| Piacenza towards Milano Centrale | InterCity Notte; Milan–Syracuse | Parma towards Siracusa |
Location
- Location within Emilia-Romagna Location within Northern Italy Location within Italy

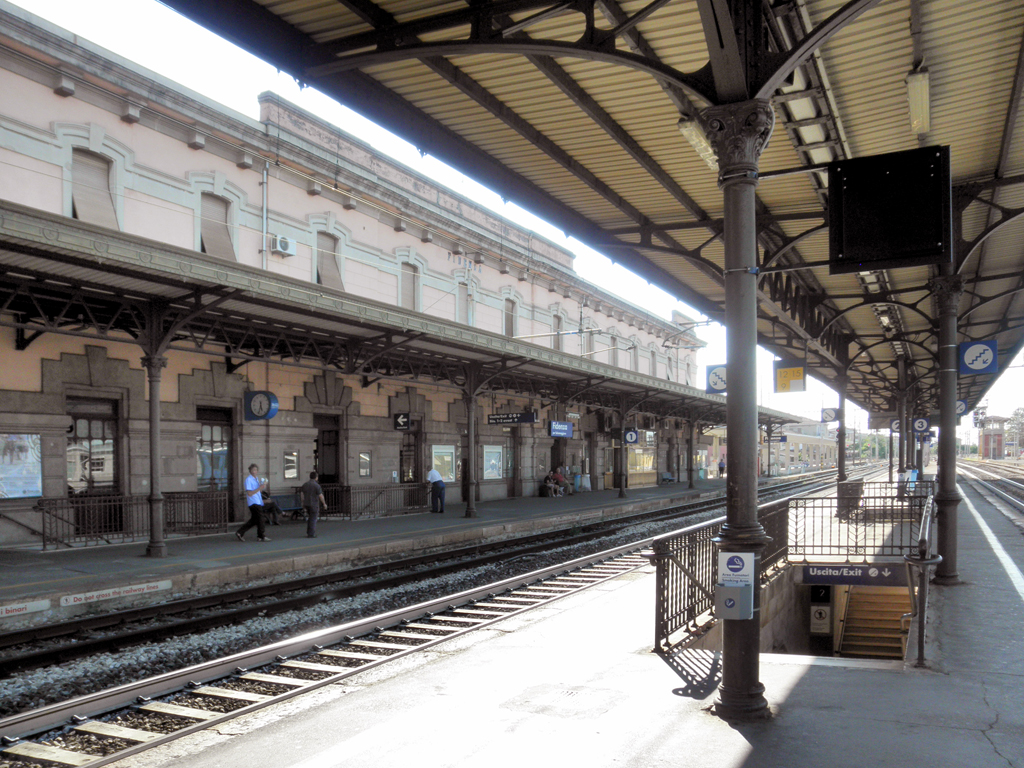
Platforms

Fidenza railway station (Stazione di Fidenza) is a station that serves the Italian city of Fidenza. It is located on the Milan–Bologna railway and lines branch off to Cremona, to Fornovo and to the nearby Salsomaggiore Terme.

== History ==
The station was called "Borgo San Donnino" until 1927, as was the city.

The station and the surrounding area have undergone a major redevelopment, with work starting in the second half of the first decade of the 2000s. After several delays in the completion of the works, the first results were seen in 2013, with the total renovation of the internal rooms, including the waiting room, central atrium, and ticket office. In the same year, a pedestrian underpass was built connecting the square in front of the station to the Via Marconi.

In 2017, after the installation of three lifts serving the three platforms used for passenger services, the last phase of the redevelopment work began, which was completed at the beginning of 2018. This resulted in the raising of all platforms to 55 cm above the rail and the installation of a shelter serving platforms 4 and 5, while the entire passenger building was painted in Parma yellow.

== Buildings and infrastructure ==
The two-storey station building, of which only the ground floor can be accessed by passengers, was built in the 1920s in a project led by the engineer Enzo Bianchi.

Rete Ferroviaria Italiana is in charge of the management of the infrastructure. The station has eight platforms, including two tracks on the west side, which are used by trains to Salsomaggiore Terme, and one on the east side.

== Rail services ==
The station is an important railway junction, served by all Trenitalia regional trains on the Piacenza–Bologna–Ancona route, giving direct hourly connections to all the major towns along the Via Emilia. Regional services bound for Milan also stop, including three services operated by TPER, and one operated by Trenord.

The short line to Salsomaggiore Terme is served at two-hourly intervals, with three services extended to Parma.

The line to Cremona has hourly rail services, alternating with some substitute bus services, connecting with trains to/from Parma and Bologna.

The line to Fornovo is no longer used for local traffic, but three pairs of trains run on it, two to/from Milan, and one, called the Freccia della Versilia, connects Bergamo with Pisa Centrale.

All daytime Intercity trains on the Milan–Bologna line also stop in Fidenza.

== Services ==
The station has:

- bar
- ticket counter
- ticket machines
- shops
- railway police station
- waiting room
- toilets.

== Interchanges ==
- bus stop.

The terminus of the Borgo San Donnino-Salsomaggiore tramway was located near the station between 1890 and 1937. It was shared by the Soragna–Borgo San Donnino tramway, which was opened in 1894 and also closed in 1937.
