= Borgolombardo railway station =

Railway station in Milan, Lombardy, Italy

Borgolombardo
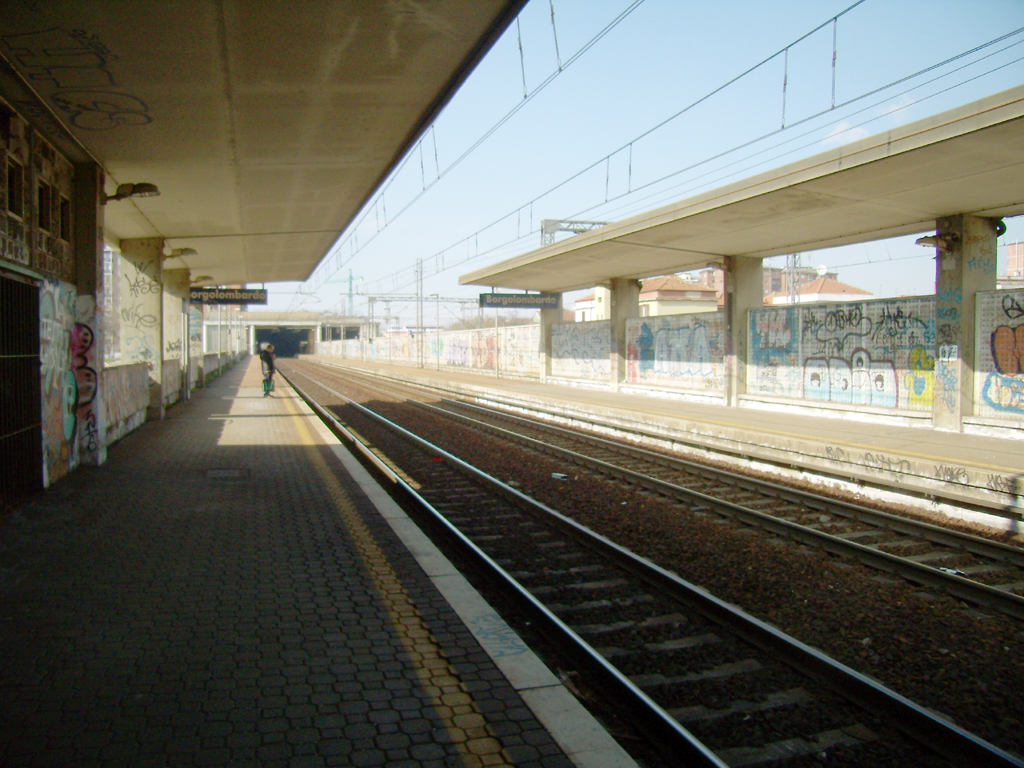

General information
- Location: Via delle Crociate; San Giuliano Milanese, Milan, Lombardy; Italy
- Coordinates: 45°24′12″N 09°16′18″E
- Owner: Rete Ferroviaria Italiana
- Operator: Trenord
- Line: Milan–Bologna
- Distance: 204.543 km (127.097 mi) from Bologna Centrale
- Platforms: 2
- Tracks: 2

Other information
- Fare zone: STIBM: Mi4
- Classification: Bronze

History
- Opened: July 1991; 35 years ago

Services
Preceding station	Trenord	Following station
San Donato Milanese towards Saronno	Line S1 (Milan suburban railway service)	San Giuliano Milanese towards Lodi
San Donato Milanese towards Cormano–Cusano Milanino	Line S12 (Milan suburban railway service)	San Giuliano Milanese towards Melegnano
Location
- Location within Lombardy Location within Northern Italy Location within Italy

Borgolombardo railway station is a railway station in Italy. Located on the Milan–Bologna railway, it serves the village of Borgolombardo, a suburb of the town of San Giuliano Milanese. The station is located on Viale delle Crociate.

== Services ==
Borgolombardo is served by lines S1 and S12 of the Milan suburban railway service, operated by the Lombard railway company Trenord.

== See also ==
- Milan suburban railway service
