= Pontremoli railway station =

Railway station in Italy

Pontremoli
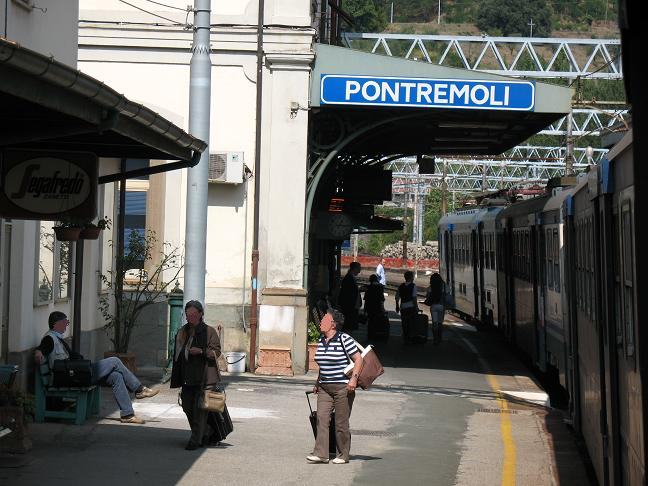
- Station

General information
- Location: Piazzale Bruno Raschi; Pontremoli, Massa and Carrara, Tuscany
- Coordinates: 44°22′19″N 9°53′15″E
- Operator: Rete Ferroviaria Italiana
- Line: Parma–La Spezia
- Platforms: 5
- Tracks: 7
- Train operators: Trenitalia

Other information
- Classification: Silver

History
- Opened: 15 November 1888; 137 years ago
- Electrified: 1949; 77 years ago
Location
- Location within Tuscany Location within Italy

Pontremoli railway station (Stazione di Pontremoli) is a station that serves the Italian town of Pontremoli and the municipalities of the upper Lunigiana, Zeri, Mulazzo and Filattiera. It is located on the Parma–La Spezia railway.

== History ==
The station was extended in 1907.

== Buildings and infrastructure ==
The station building is a two-storey building. The lower storey is used for various offices, the waiting room and the bar. The upper storey contains the station master's apartment. The three access doors to the passenger building from Piazzale Bruno Raschi are covered by a wrought iron canopy. The station has seven platforms, five of which are used for passengers and two for freight transport and the stabling of rolling stock. Platform 1 is usually used by trains bound for Parma, platform 2 is used by trains bound for La Spezia Centrale, while platforms 3, 4 and 5 are used for the departures of trains originating at the station. The station has shelters for all five platforms, and has recently been equipped with a modern underpass.

== Rail services ==
All passenger trains that pass through the station stop at it.

== Services ==
The station, which RFI manages and classified in 2008 in the silver category, has:

- ticket office
- ticket machines
- waiting room
- bar
- toilets

== Interchange ==
- taxi rank
- bus stop (TEP).
