= QLP =

QLP may refer to:

- Quebec Liberal Party, in Canada
- Queensland Labor Party, in Australia
  - Queensland Labor Party (1957), until 1978
- La Spezia Centrale railway station, Italy, IATA code QLP
