= Line S12 (Milan suburban railway service) =

Railway line in Milan, Italy

Cormano-Cusano Milanino–Melegnano

Overview
- Status: Operating
- Locale: Milan metropolitan area, Italy
- Termini: Cormano-Cusano Milanino; Melegnano
- Stations: 15
- Website: Trenord (in Italian)

Service
- Type: Commuter rail
- Route number: S12
- Operator(s): Trenord
- Rolling stock: Treno Servizio Regionale

History
- Opened: 12 September 2016; 9 years ago

Technical
- Track gauge: 1,435 mm (4 ft 8 1/2 in)
- Electrification: 3 kV DC
Route map

The line S12 (Italian: Linea S12) is a commuter rail route forming part of the Milan suburban railway service (Italian: Servizio ferroviario suburbano di Milano), which converges on the city of Milan, Italy.

The route runs over the infrastructure of the Milan Passante, Milan–Bologna and Milan-Asso railways. Like all but one of the other Milan suburban railway service routes, it is operated by Trenord.

== Route ==
Line S12, a cross-city route, heads initially in a southerly direction from Milano Bovisa through the Milan Passante railway to Milano Rogoredo. From there, it turns south-east towards its southern terminus, Melegnano.

== History ==
The route was activated on 12 September 2016. The route was suspended on 25 February 2020 due to COVID-19 pandemic and it has been partially restored in August 2023, with four trains per direction per day, running at 15 minutes intervals when paired with line S1. A more complete service shall be restored in 2024: since June 2024, service has been expanded, with 10 round trip per day from Cormano-Cusano Milanino to Melegnano and one round trip per day between Cormano-Cusano Milanino and Milano Rogoredo; this has been made possible by the construction and opening of the third track from Milano Affori to Cormano-Cusano, allowing for more separation between regional trains, which run express from Affori to Cesano Maderno, and suburban all-stopping trains. As of June 2026, S12 trains are limited to Bovisa Politecnico station, but run regularly every 30 minutes on weekday instead of just a few rides per day.

== Stations ==
The stations on the S12 are as follows (stations with a coloured background are within the municipality of Milan):

Station	Opened	Interchange	Note
Cormano-Cusano Milanino	2015	Line S2 (Milan suburban railway service) Line S4 (Milan suburban railway service)	Currently not served, as of June 2026
Milano Bruzzano Parco Nord	2014	Line S2 (Milan suburban railway service) Line S4 (Milan suburban railway service)	Currently not served, as of June 2026
Milano Affori	2011	Treni regionali	Currently not served, as of June 2026
Milano Bovisa	1879	MXP	Current northern terminus of the line
Milano Lancetti	1997	Line S13	
Milano Porta Garibaldi	1963	MXP	
Milano Repubblica	1997	Line M3 Line S13	
Milano Porta Venezia	1997	Line M1 Line S13	
Milano Dateo	2002	Line S13	
Milano Porta Vittoria	2004	Line S13	
Milano Rogoredo	1862	Line M3 Line S13 Treni regionali	
San Donato Milanese	2003	Line S1 (Milan suburban railway service)	
Borgolombardo	1991	Line S1 (Milan suburban railway service)	
San Giuliano Milanese	1931	Line S1 (Milan suburban railway service)	
Melegnano	1861	Line S1 (Milan suburban railway service)	

== See also ==
- History of rail transport in Italy
- List of Milan S Lines stations
- Rail transport in Italy
- Transport in Milan
