= San Donato Milanese railway station =

Railway station in Italy

San Donato Milanese
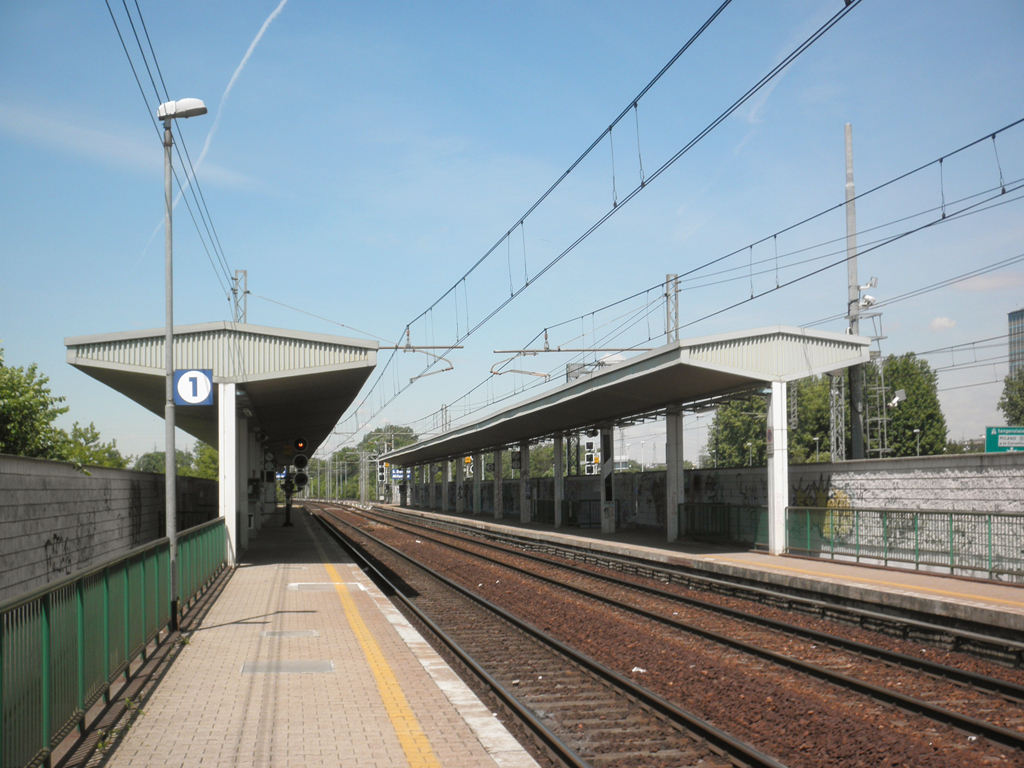

General information
- Location: Piazza della Stazione; San Donato Milanese, Milan, Lombardy; Italy
- Coordinates: 45°25′07″N 09°15′11″E
- Owner: Rete Ferroviaria Italiana
- Operator: Trenord
- Line: Milan–Bologna
- Distance: 206.609 km (128.381 mi) from Bologna Centrale
- Platforms: 2
- Tracks: 4

Other information
- Fare zone: STIBM: Mi3
- Classification: Bronze

History
- Opened: 13 December 2003; 22 years ago

Services
Preceding station	Trenord	Following station
Milano Rogoredo towards Saronno	Line S1 (Milan suburban railway service)	Borgolombardo towards Lodi
Milano Rogoredo towards Cormano–Cusano Milanino	Line S12 (Milan suburban railway service)	Borgolombardo towards Melegnano
Location
- Location within Milan Location within Lombardy Location within Northern Italy Location within Italy

San Donato Milanese railway station is a railway station in Italy. Located on the Milan–Bologna railway, it serves the town of San Donato Milanese.

== Services ==
San Donato Milanese is served by lines S1 and S12 of the Milan suburban railway service, operated by the Lombard railway company Trenord.

== See also ==
- Milan suburban railway service
