= Parma railway station =

Railway station in Parma, Italy

Parma
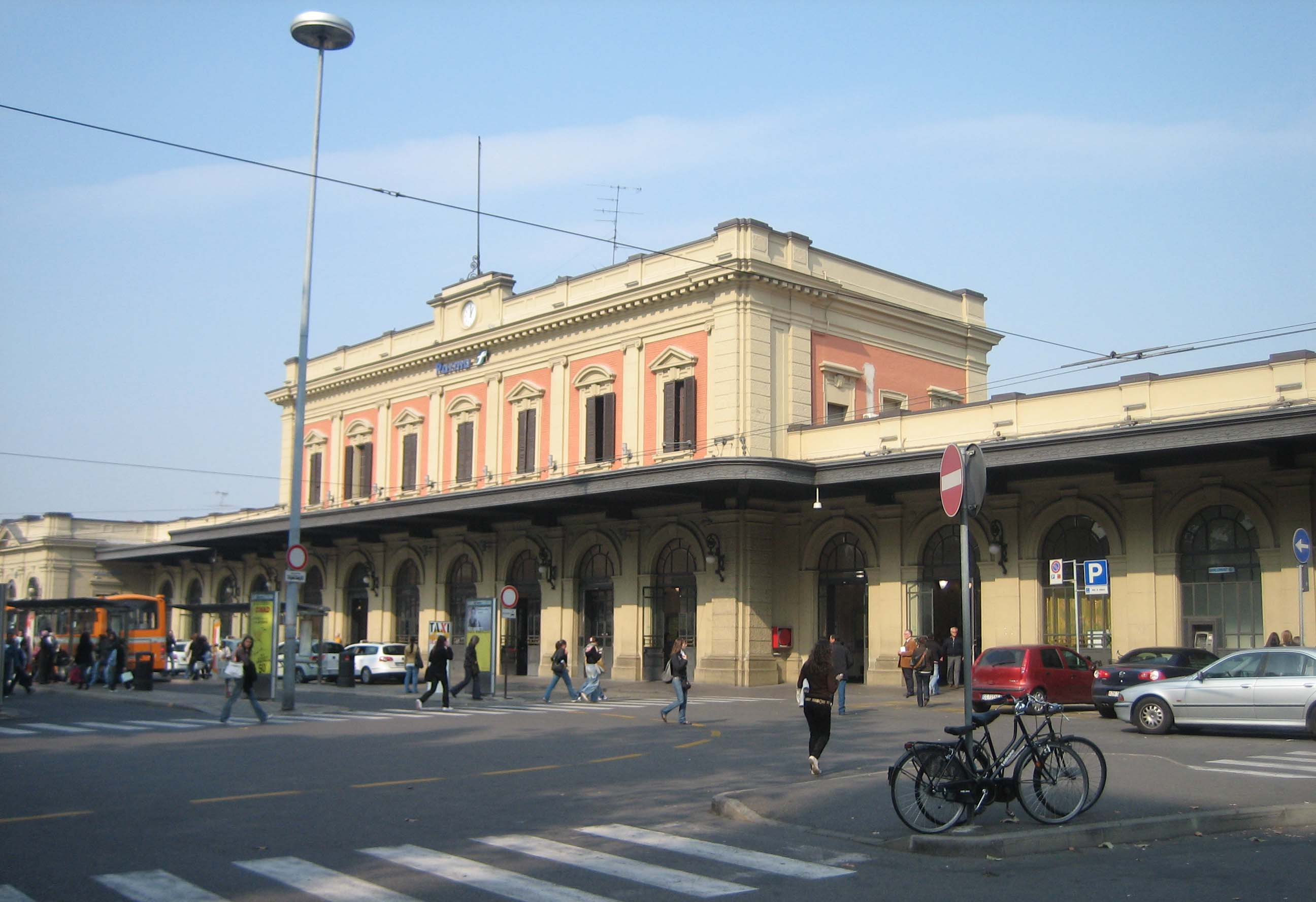
- View of the passenger building in 2007.

General information
- Location: Piazzale Carlo Alberto dalla Chiesa; 43121 Parma PR; Parma, Parma, Emilia-Romagna
- Coordinates: 44°48′37″N 10°19′42″E
- Operator: Rete Ferroviaria Italiana; Centostazioni
- Lines: Milan–Bologna; Parma–La Spezia and Sarzana; Brescia–Parma; Parma–Suzzara
- Distance: 89.741 km (55.762 mi) from Bologna Centrale
- Platforms: 4 (serving 8 tracks)
- Train operators: Trenitalia; Ferrovie Emilia Romagna (FER)
- Connections: Parma trolleybus system Urban and suburban buses

Other information
- Classification: Gold

History
- Opened: 21 July 1859; 167 years ago
- Electrified: 1938; 88 years ago

Services
Preceding station	Trenitalia	Following station
Fidenza towards Milano Centrale	InterCity Notte; Milan–Syracuse	Reggio Emilia towards Siracusa
Location
- Location within Emilia-Romagna Location within Northern Italy Location within Italy

Parma (Italian: Stazione di Parma) is a railway station serving the city of Parma, in the region of Emilia-Romagna, northern Italy. The station opened in 1859 and is located on the Milan–Bologna railway, Pontremolese railway (to La Spezia), Brescia–Parma railway and Parma–Suzzara railway. The train services are operated by Trenitalia, Trenord and Ferrovie Emilia Romagna.

The station is currently managed by Rete Ferroviaria Italiana (RFI). However, the commercial area of the passenger building is managed by Centostazioni. Each of these companies is a subsidiary of Ferrovie dello Stato (FS), Italy's state-owned rail company.

== Location ==
Parma railway station is situated at Piazzale Carlo Alberto dalla Chiesa, at the northern edge of the city centre.

== History ==
The station was inaugurated on 21 July 1859 together with the extension from Piacenza. It was rebuilt to the design of the Spanish architect Oriol Bohigas between 2007 and 2014.

== Features ==
The passenger building is composed of a large central section and two smaller side buildings, connected by corridors. Inside are the ticket office, waiting room and other public facilities, as well as the headquarters of the railway police and the traffic management department. The upper floor is used by Trenitalia.

The station yard has eight tracks used for passenger services. They are served by a total of four platforms, which are equipped with shelters and connected via a pedestrian underpass. The station yard also has a locomotive shed and a turntable.

A short distance from the station, along the line towards Milan, is a goods yard, which is still in use.

== Train services ==
The station is served by the following service(s):

- High speed services (Frecciarossa) Milan - Parma - Bologna - Florence - Rome
- High speed services (Frecciabianca) Milan - Parma - Bologna - Ancona - Pescara - Foggia - Bari - Brindisi - Lecce
- High speed services (Frecciabianca) Milan - Parma - Bologna - Ancona - Pescara - Foggia - Bari - Taranto
- High speed services (Frecciabianca) Turin - Parma - Bologna - Ancona - Pescara - Foggia - Bari - Brindisi - Lecce
- Intercity services Milan - Parma - Bologna - Florence - Rome - Naples - Salerno - Lamezia Termi - Reggio Calabria
- Intercity services Milan - Parma - Bologna - Rimini - Ancona - Pescara - Foggia - Bari - Brindisi - Lecce
- Intercity services Milan - Parma - Bologna - Rimini - Ancona - Pescara - Foggia - Bari - Taranto
- Night train (Intercity Notte) Turin - Milan - Parma - Reggio Emilia - Florence - Rome - Salerno - Lamezia Terme - Reggio di Calabria
- Night train (Intercity Notte) Milan - Parma - Bolgona - Ancona - Pescara - Foggia - Bari - Brindisi - Lecce
- Express services (Regionale Veloce) Piacenza - Parma - Reggio Emilia - Bologna - Rimini - Ancona
- Express services (Regionale Veloce) Milan - Piacenza - Parma - Reggio Emilia - Bologna (- Rimini)
- Regional services (Treno regionale) Parma - Reggio Emilia - Modena - Bologna
- Regional services (Treno regionale) Brescia - Ghedi - Asola - Piadena - Casalmaggiore - Parma
- Regional services (Treno regionale) Genoa - La Spezia - Aulla - Pontremoli - Fornovo - Parma
- Local services (Treno regionale) Parma - Guastalla - Suzzara

== Passenger and train movements ==
The station has about 8 million passenger movements each year.

Many passenger trains call at the station platforms. They include regional, express, InterCity, Frecciabianca services, and a daily pair of Frecciarossa high speed trains.

The main destinations of the regional trains are Milan, Bologna, La Spezia, Pontremoli and Brescia.

== Interchange ==
The station provides interchange with the Parma trolleybus system, and with urban and suburban buses.

== See also ==
- History of rail transport in Italy
- List of railway stations in Emilia-Romagna
- Rail transport in Italy
- Railway stations in Italy
