= Reggio Emilia railway station =

Railway station in Italy

Reggio Emilia
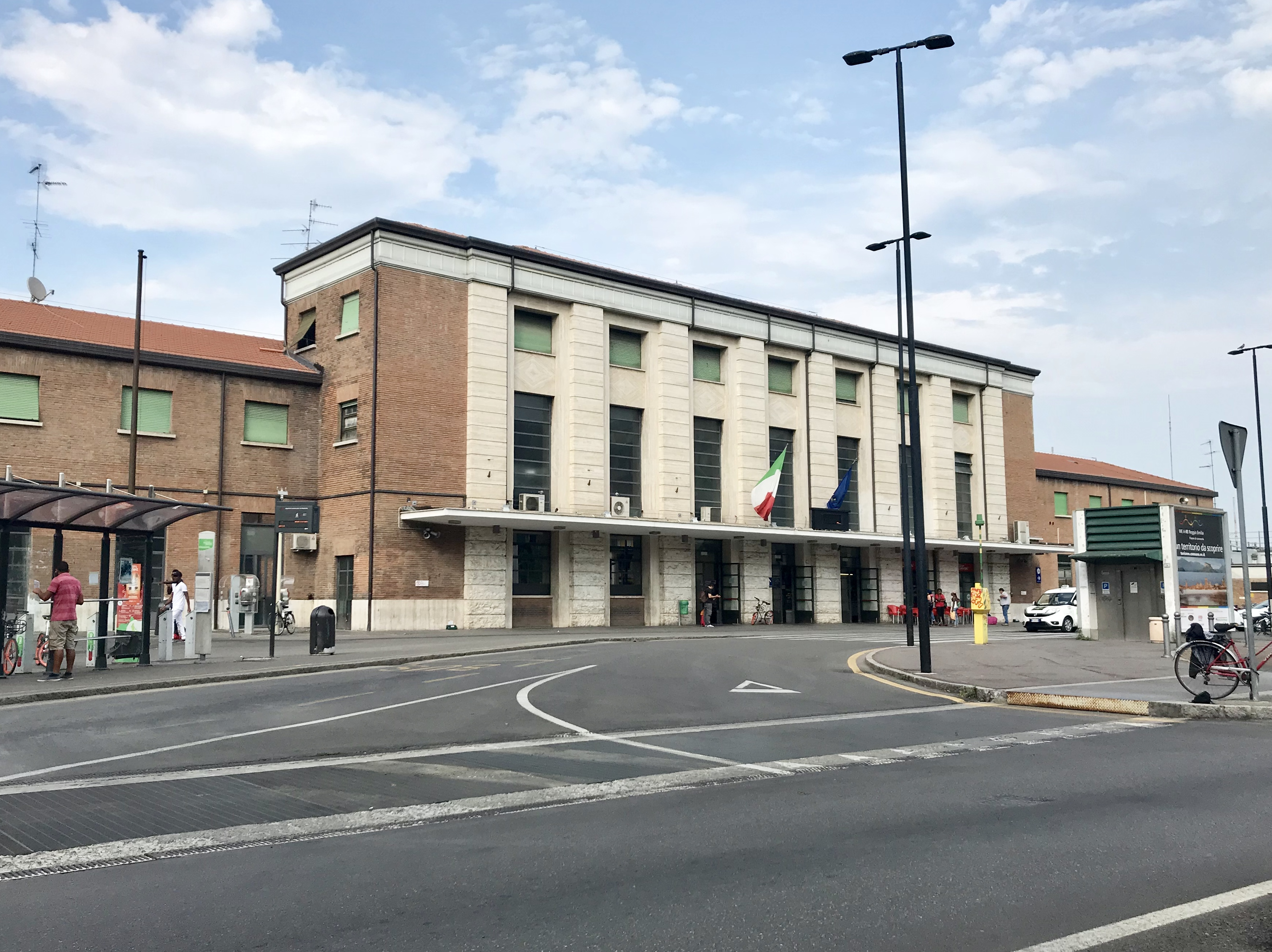
- The passenger building.

General information
- Location: Piazza Guglielmo Marconi; 42124 Reggio Emilia RE; Reggio Emilia, Reggio Emilia, Emilia-Romagna; Italy
- Coordinates: 44°41′52″N 10°38′35″E
- Operator: Rete Ferroviaria Italiana; Centostazioni
- Lines: Milano–Bologna; Reggio Emilia–Ciano d'Enza; Reggio Emilia–Guastalla; Reggio Emilia–Sassuolo
- Distance: 61.435 km (38.174 mi) from Bologna Centrale
- Train operators: Trenitalia; Ferrovie Emilia Romagna (FER)
- Connections: Urban and suburban buses

Construction
- Architect: Roberto Narducci

Other information
- Classification: Gold

History
- Opened: 21 July 1859; 167 years ago
- Electrified: 1938

Services
Preceding station	Trenitalia	Following station
Parma towards Milano Centrale	InterCity Notte; Milan–Syracuse	Modena towards Siracusa
Location
- Location within Emilia-Romagna Location within Northern Italy Location within Italy

Reggio Emilia (Italian: Stazione di Reggio Emilia) is a railway station serving the city of Reggio Emilia, in the region of Emilia-Romagna, northern Italy. The station opened in 1859 and is located on the Milan–Bologna railway, Reggio Emilia–Ciano d'Enza railway, Reggio Emilia–Guastalla railway and Reggio Emilia–Sassuolo railway. The train services are operated by Trenitalia and Ferrovie Emilia Romagna.

The station is currently managed by Rete Ferroviaria Italiana (RFI). However, the commercial area of the passenger building is managed by Centostazioni. Each of these companies is a subsidiary of Ferrovie dello Stato (FS), Italy's state-owned rail company.

The city gained a high-speed railway station in June 2013, Reggio Emilia AV Mediopadana railway station.

== Location ==
Reggio Emilia railway station is situated at Piazza Guglielmo Marconi, at the eastern edge of the city centre.

== History ==
The station was opened on 21 July 1859, together with the rest of the Piacenza–Bologna section of the Milan–Bologna railway.

The original passenger building was replaced in the mid-1930s with a new one, designed by the architect Angiolo Mazzoni. A few years later, the 1930s building was destroyed by bombing during World War II. It was replaced by the current structure, designed by the architect Roberto Narducci.

== Features ==
=== Passenger building ===
The passenger building consists of three sections. The central section has a colonnade of eight columns covered in marble. Between each pair of columns, there is a large window providing light to interior spaces. The two lateral wings extend symmetrically from the central section and are faced with brick. The central section has three levels (of which only the ground floor is accessible to passengers), while the lateral wings are two storeys high.

A masonry roof provides weather protection to the entrances at the front of the building, while the entrances on the station yard side are protected by a platform canopy.

In May 2007, work was completed on the renovation of the station. The project, financed by RFI and Centostazioni, cost 1.2 million euros. The renovation work was mainly to the passenger building. It included the removal of surplus elements built after the bombings of World War II, the installation of a new lighting system, additional facilities for commercial services, the renovation of public conveniences, and alterations required by laws regulating technological systems.

=== Station yard ===
The station yard has five tracks for passenger services. Tracks three and four form part of the main line (track 3 for trains with odd numbers, and track 4 for even numbered trains). The other tracks are loop sidings, and are used for trains terminating or overtaking other trains at Reggio Emilia.

All tracks except for track 2 have a platform sheltered by a canopy. The platforms are connected by a pedestrian underpass.

There are many other tracks (without a platform) that are used for storing rolling stock or for goods services. The station also has a goods yard with a goods shed that has been converted into a warehouse. The design of the goods shed is very similar to that of its counterparts at other Italian railway stations.

== Train services ==
The station is served by the following service(s):

- High speed services (Frecciarossa) Milan - Parma - Bologna - Florence - Rome
- High speed services (Frecciabianca) Milan - Parma - Bologna - Ancona - Pescara - Foggia - Bari - Brindisi - Lecce
- High speed services (Frecciabianca) Milan - Parma - Bologna - Ancona - Pescara - Foggia - Bari - Taranto
- High speed services (Frecciabianca) Turin - Parma - Bologna - Ancona - Pescara - Foggia - Bari - Brindisi - Lecce
- Intercity services Milan - Parma - Bologna - Florence - Rome - Naples - Salerno - Lamezia Termi - Reggio Calabria
- Intercity services Milan - Parma - Bologna - Rimini - Ancona - Pescara - Foggia - Bari - Brindisi - Lecce
- Intercity services Milan - Parma - Bologna - Rimini - Ancona - Pescara - Foggia - Bari - Taranto
- Night train (Intercity Notte) Turin - Milan - Parma - Reggio Emilia - Florence - Rome - Salerno - Lamezia Terme - Reggio di Calabria
- Night train (Intercity Notte) Milan - Parma - Bolgona - Ancona - Pescara - Foggia - Bari - Brindisi - Lecce
- Express services (Regionale Veloce) Piacenza - Parma - Reggio Emilia - Bologna - Rimini - Ancona
- Express services (Regionale Veloce) Milan - Piacenza - Parma - Reggio Emilia - Bolgona (- Rimini)
- Regional services (Treno regionale) Parma - Reggio Emilia - Modena - Bologna
- Local services (Treno regionale) Guastalla - Bagnolo in Piano - Reggio Emilia
- Local services (Treno regionale) Reggio Emilia - Sassuolo
- Local services (Treno regionale) Ciano - Reggio Emilia

== Passenger and train movements ==
The station has about 4 million passenger movements each year.

The passenger trains calling at the station include regional, express, InterCity, InterCity Night, Frecciabianca services, and a daily pair of Frecciarossa high speed trains.

A total of about 165 passenger trains serve the station each day. Their main destinations are Torino Porta Nuova, Parma and Bologna Centrale.

== See also ==
- History of rail transport in Italy
- List of railway stations in Emilia-Romagna
- Rail transport in Italy
- Railway stations in Italy
