= Tavazzano railway station =

Railway station in Italy

Tavazzano
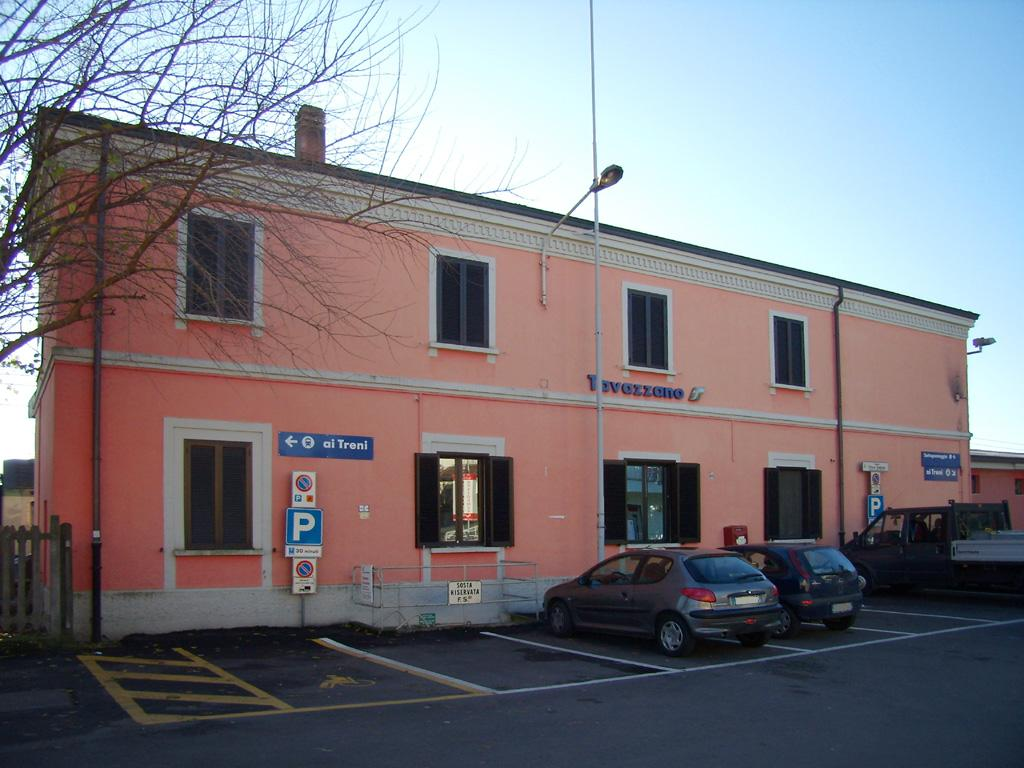

General information
- Location: Via Giuseppe Garibaldi; Tavazzano con Villavesco, Lodi, Lombardy; Italy
- Coordinates: 45°19′35″N 09°24′11″E
- Owner: Rete Ferroviaria Italiana
- Operator: Trenord
- Line: Milan–Bologna
- Distance: 190.409 km (118.315 mi) from Bologna Centrale
- Platforms: 2
- Tracks: 2

Other information
- Fare zone: STIBM: Mi7
- Classification: Silver

History
- Opened: 14 November 1861; 164 years ago
- Electrified: 1938

Services
Preceding station	Trenord	Following station
San Zenone al Lambro towards Saronno	Line S1 (Milan suburban railway service)	Lodi Terminus
Location
- Location within Lombardy Location within Northern Italy Location within Italy

Tavazzano is a railway station in Italy. Located on the Milan–Bologna railway, it serves the municipality of Tavazzano con Villavesco.

== Services ==
Tavazzano is served by line S1 of the Milan suburban railway network, operated by the Lombard railway company Trenord.

== See also ==
- Milan suburban railway network
