= San Zenone al Lambro railway station =

Railway station in Italy

San Zenone al Lambro
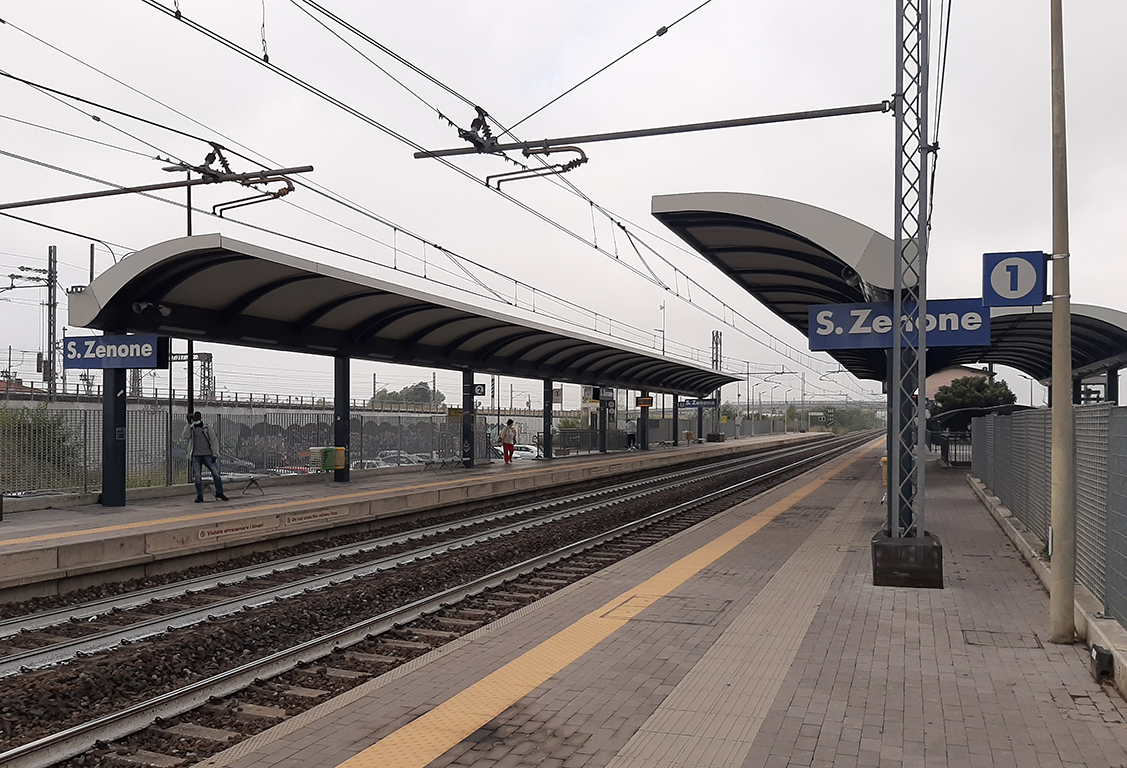

General information
- Location: Via Stazione (loc. Villa Bissone); San Zenone al Lambro, Milan, Lombardy; Italy
- Coordinates: 45°20′17″N 09°21′41″E
- Operator: Trenord
- Line: Milan–Bologna
- Distance: 193.916 km (120.494 mi) from Bologna Centrale
- Platforms: 2
- Tracks: 2

Other information
- Fare zone: STIBM: Mi6
- Classification: Silver

History
- Opened: 1931; 95 years ago

Services
| Preceding station | Trenord | Following station |
|---|---|---|
| Melegnano towards Saronno | Line S1 (Milan suburban railway service) | Tavazzano towards Lodi |
Location
- Location within Lombardy Location within Northern Italy Location within Italy

San Zenone al Lambro is a railway station in Italy. Located on the Milan–Bologna railway, it serves the municipality of San Zenone al Lambro.

== Services ==
San Zenone al Lambro is served by line S1 of the Milan suburban railway network, operated by the Lombard railway company Trenord.

== See also ==
- Milan suburban railway network
