= Parma–La Spezia railway =

Italian railway line

Overview
- Native name: Ferrovia Pontremolese
- Owner: RFI
- Line number: 99, 100
- Locale: Italy
- Termini: Parma; La Spezia Centrale

Service
- Operator(s): Trenitalia

History
- Opened: 1883

Technical
- Line length: 113 km (70 mi)
- Track gauge: 1,435 mm (4 ft 8 1/2 in) standard gauge
- Electrification: 3000 V DC

The Parma–La Spezia railway is the railway line that connects Parma, Italy with the Genoa–Pisa railway near La Spezia over the Cisa Pass through the Apennines. The route is approximately 120 kilometres long. Its Italian name (ferrovia Pontremolese) derives from the town of Pontremoli, one of the main towns it passes through.

The railway infrastructure is managed by the Rete Ferroviaria Italiana, which classifies it as one of its primary lines.

== History ==
Section	Opened
La Spezia-Vezzano Ligure	4 August 1864 (Note: Part of the Genoa–Pisa line.)
Parma-Fornovo di Taro	2 July 1883
Vezzano Ligure-Pontremoli	15 November 1888
Fornovo di Taro-Berceto	25 March 1889
Berceto-Borgotaro	15 May 1893
Borgotaro-Pontremoli	1 August 1894
Santo Stefano di Magra-Sarzana	9 August 1897

The first plans for a railway linking the middle Po Valley with the Ligurian and Tyrrhenian coasts began to be considered in 1860, when the Kingdom of Sardinia acquired Lombardy, Emilia and Tuscany.

In particular, consideration was given to a line connecting the La Spezia Naval Base with the stronghold of Piacenza (in preparation for a possible war to liberate the Veneto from the Austrian Empire) between two existing trans-Apennine lines, the line under the Giovi Pass north of Genoa and the Porrettana Railway between Bologna and Florence.

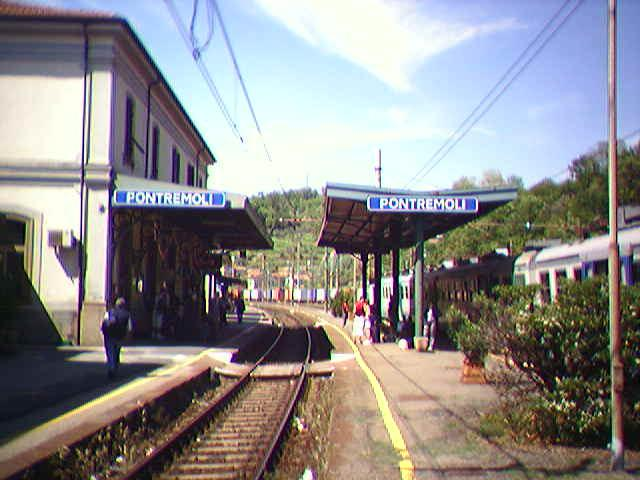
Pontremoli station from which the line takes its name

Two routes were mainly considered: one between Parma and the Gulf of La Spezia passing through the Taro and Magra valleys, the other from Lucca to Reggio Emilia and Modena. This second solution was preferred by the Livorno authorities, as it would have promoted trade through the town's port at the expense of the Ligurian sea ports.

Under a decree issued on 17 July 1860, the government headed by Cavour, appointed a commission to examine the proposals for the construction of the line. In the meantime, numerous projects for the construction of the line were prepared and presented by private individuals. The commission set out its conclusions in a report dated 16 June 1862 (but published in 1863), which established that a line between Piacenza and La Spezia was indeed of strategic interest, and that the shortest and easiest route was the one that passed through the Taro and Magra valleys, crossing the Apennines through the Borgallo tunnel.

=== Construction ===
Work on the construction of the line, financed by the Baccarini law, began in 1879, and the whole line was completed in 1894. Three years later a link was built from Santo Stefano di Magra to Sarzana to facilitate traffic.

Almost entirely single track, the line was immediately equipped with a second track through the pass section, where the line runs through the most difficult country. The section comprising the pass tunnel (Borgallo tunnel, 7,972 metres-long) and the steep section between Grondola-Guinadi and Pontremoli (with grades of 2.0% in the tunnel and 2.5% in the open sections) were immediately doubled.

In 1931, the line was electrified with the three-phase AC system at 3600 V and 16.67 Hz; during the Second World War it suffered heavy damage, due to its high strategic value as an access route to the Po Valley. The gradual conversion of the line to 3000 V DC electrification, which had already started in 1937, was completed in late 1949, following the electrification of the Milan–Bologna railway, which made it worthwhile to electrify the neighbouring lines including the Parma–Fornovo and Fornovo–Fidenza lines on the same system.

=== Doubling ===
The line, which was originally built as single track except for the Borgo Val di Taro–Pontremoli section, has been undergoing duplication since the 1980s with the construction of track at new locations with better grades and geometry.

The line modernisation project dates back to a financial appropriation under the Piano integrativo ("integration plan") of 1981.

==== Duplicated sections ====
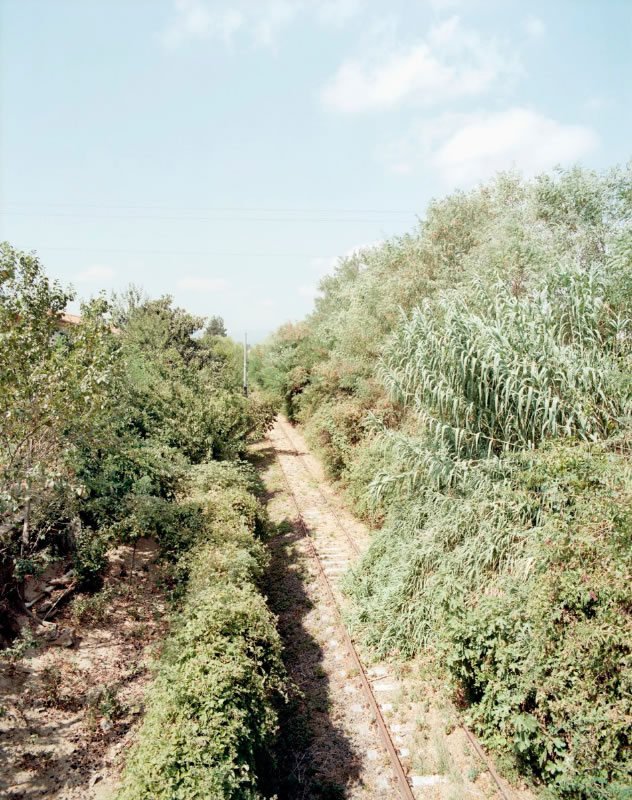
View of the unused section between Ponzano Magra and Sarzana on the short branch from Santo Stefano di Magra-Sarzana

By 1996, duplication had been completed only on the section from Vezzano Ligure to Santo Stefano di Magra.

On 22 May 1996, the double track deviation between Solignano and Berceto was opened, almost entirely in tunnel. The opening of the new line involved the closure of Valmozzola station.

The new La Spezia Marittima freight yard was opened in 2003.

On 11 September 2005, the double track on the Santo Stefano di Magra–Chiesaccia crossing loop section, connecting with the Lucca–Aulla railway, was opened in 2008.

This work also involved moving the southern link with the Tyrrhenian line northwards, leading to the closure to traffic of the single track section between Santo Stefano di Magra and Sarzana opened on 9 August 1897, including Ponzano Magra station. Consequently, Sarzana has not been a terminus of the line since the early 2000s. The double track junction is now located near Arcola station. The northern link, originally located near Vezzano Ligure station has been moved north as a result of the addition of a track dedicated to the Parma–La Spezia traffic, which runs parallel to the Genoa–Pisa railway from Vezzano Ligure to La Spezia Migliarina.

Work was completed on doubling the Solignano–Fornovo section in 2014.

==== Work to be done ====
As of 2011, final planning was underway for the doubling of the remaining sections:

- Berceto–Chiesaccia, with the completion of the link with the Lucca–Aulla railway, part of which had already started with the doubling of earlier years;
- Osteriazza–Parma.

Under a decree of 5 July 2020, funds of €78 million have been allocated, which will be followed by a second tranche of an additional €92 million, totalling €170 million, to finance the upgrade of the line and completion of the doubling of the Parma–Vicofertile section by 2032.

== Traffic ==
Tunnel	Length (metres)
Solignano	1,572
Ossella	1,381
Groppo S. Giovanni	2,489
Maccagnana	2,275
Martini	1,370
Borgallo	7,972
Scorrano	1,028
Serena	7,014

Designed from the outset to facilitate the movement of goods between the ports of the upper Tyrrhenian Sea and Northern Italy (the so-called Tyrrhenian–Brenner corridor), it is still used for this purpose.

Passenger traffic, on the other hand, consists solely of regional trains and is largely limited to commuter traffic from the two valleys to the nearby capitals; however, there are some pairs of longer-distance trains that connect the main cities of the Ligurian and Tyrrhenian coast with some important centres in Emilia and Lombardy, passing through the Fidenza hub.

The movement of trains on the whole line is controlled from the signalling centre in Pisa.

All passenger trains on the line stop at Fornovo, Borgo val di Taro, Pontremoli, Villafranca-Bagnone, Aulla Lunigiana and Santo Stefano di Magra stations.
