= Trolleybuses in Parma =

Part of public transport in northern Italy

Parma trolleybus system
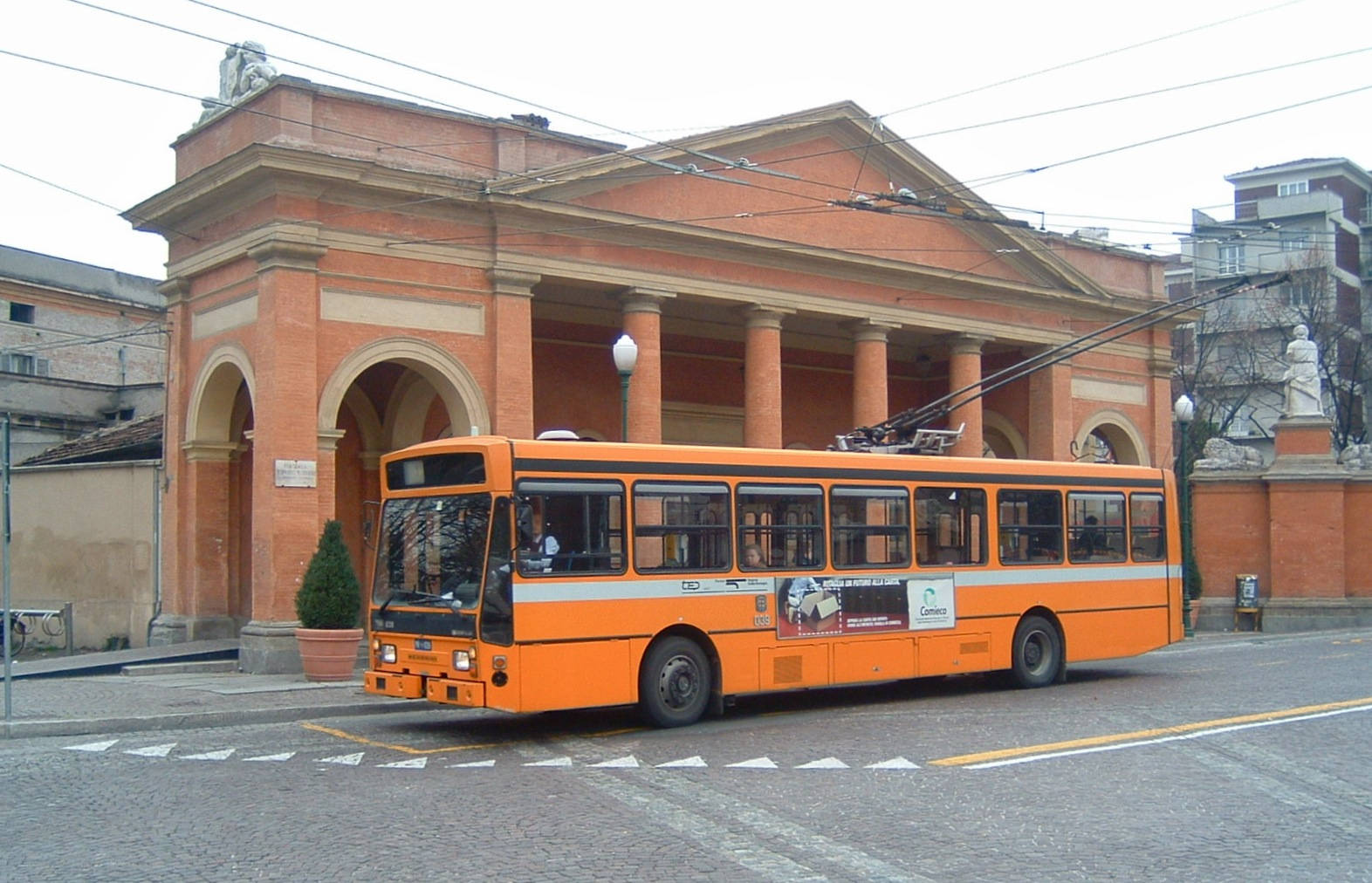
- Menarini trolleybus 039 at Piazzale Barbieri

Operation
- Locale: Parma, Emilia-Romagna, Italy
- Open: 1953
- Routes: 4
- Operator: TEP (Parma)

Infrastructure
- Electrification: 600 V DC parallel overhead lines

Statistics
- Route length: 18.6 km (11.6 mi), about 37.2 km of catenary
Overview
- Website: http://www.tep.pr.it/ TEP (in Italian)

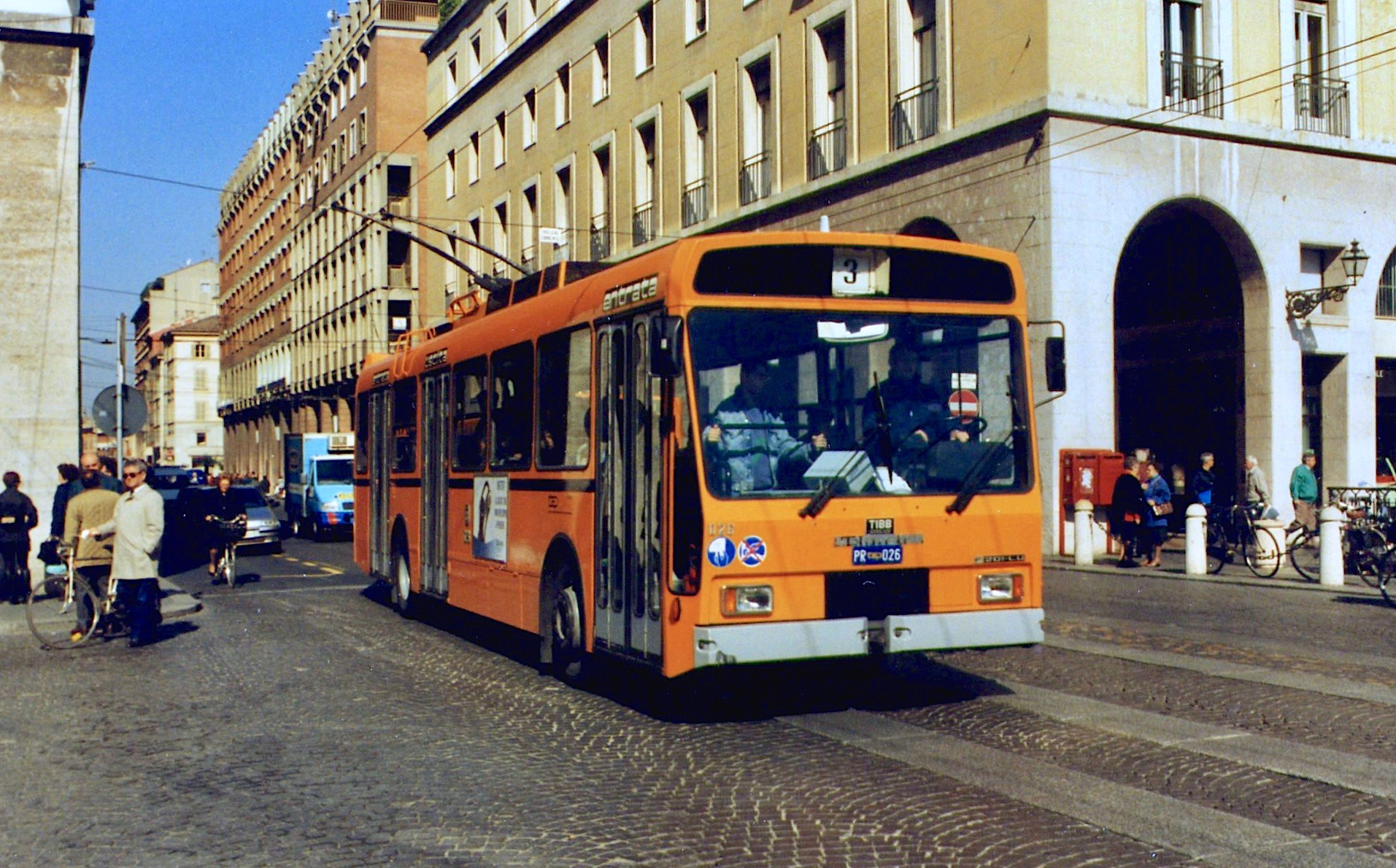
Menarini trolleybus 026 at Piazza Garibaldi, on route 3, in 1997

The Parma trolleybus system (Italian: Rete filoviaria di Parma) forms part of the public transport network of the city and comune of Parma, in the region of Emilia-Romagna, northern Italy. In operation since 1953, the system presently comprises four urban routes.

== History ==
When the Parma trolleybus system commenced operations on 25 October 1953, it consisted of three routes:

- 1 Stazione FS — Cimitero della Villetta
- 2 San Leonardo — Via Montebello
- 3 San Lazzaro — Crocetta

One month later, on 25 November 1953, the trolleybus system's predecessor, the Parma tramway network, was closed.

In 1968, trolleybus route 1 was extended to the cemetery at Orzi di Baganza. In 1972, route 2 was extended, but was also simultaneously converted into a diesel bus route. This has been the only closure of a trolleybus route in Parma.

In the 1980s and 1990s, the trolleybus system was expanded. On 21 November 1987, route 1 was extended from Orzi di Baganza to Strada Farnese. On 14 December 1989, bus route 4 was converted into a trolleybus route. And on 5 December 1998, bus route 5 was similarly converted.

== Services ==
The routes comprising the present Parma trolleybus system are:

- 1 Stazione FS — Strada Farnese
- 3 San Lazzaro — Crocetta
- 4 Via Parigi — Via Mordacci
- 5 Via Orazio — Via Chiavari

== Fleet ==
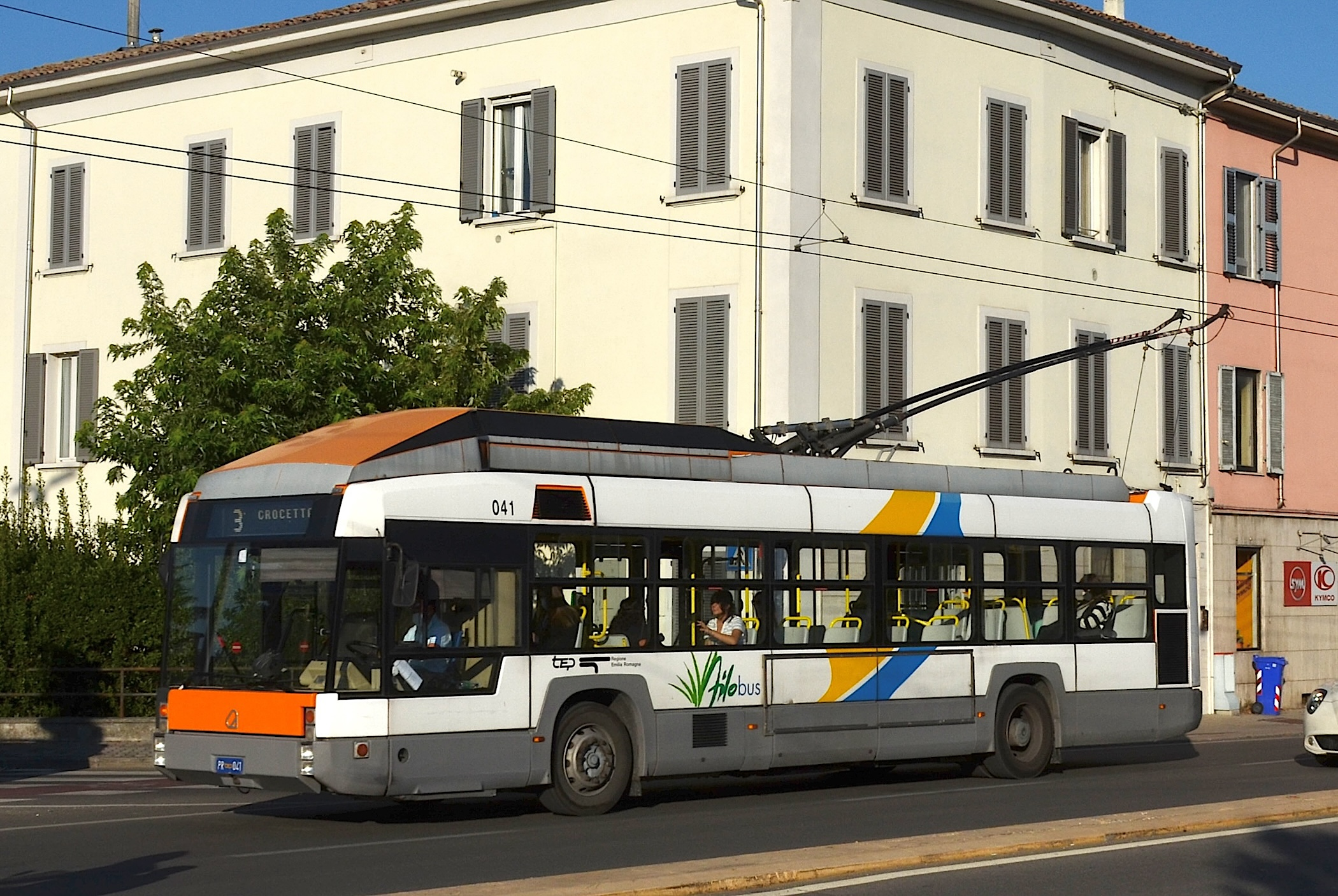
Autodromo-built trolleybus 041 on route 3 in 2022

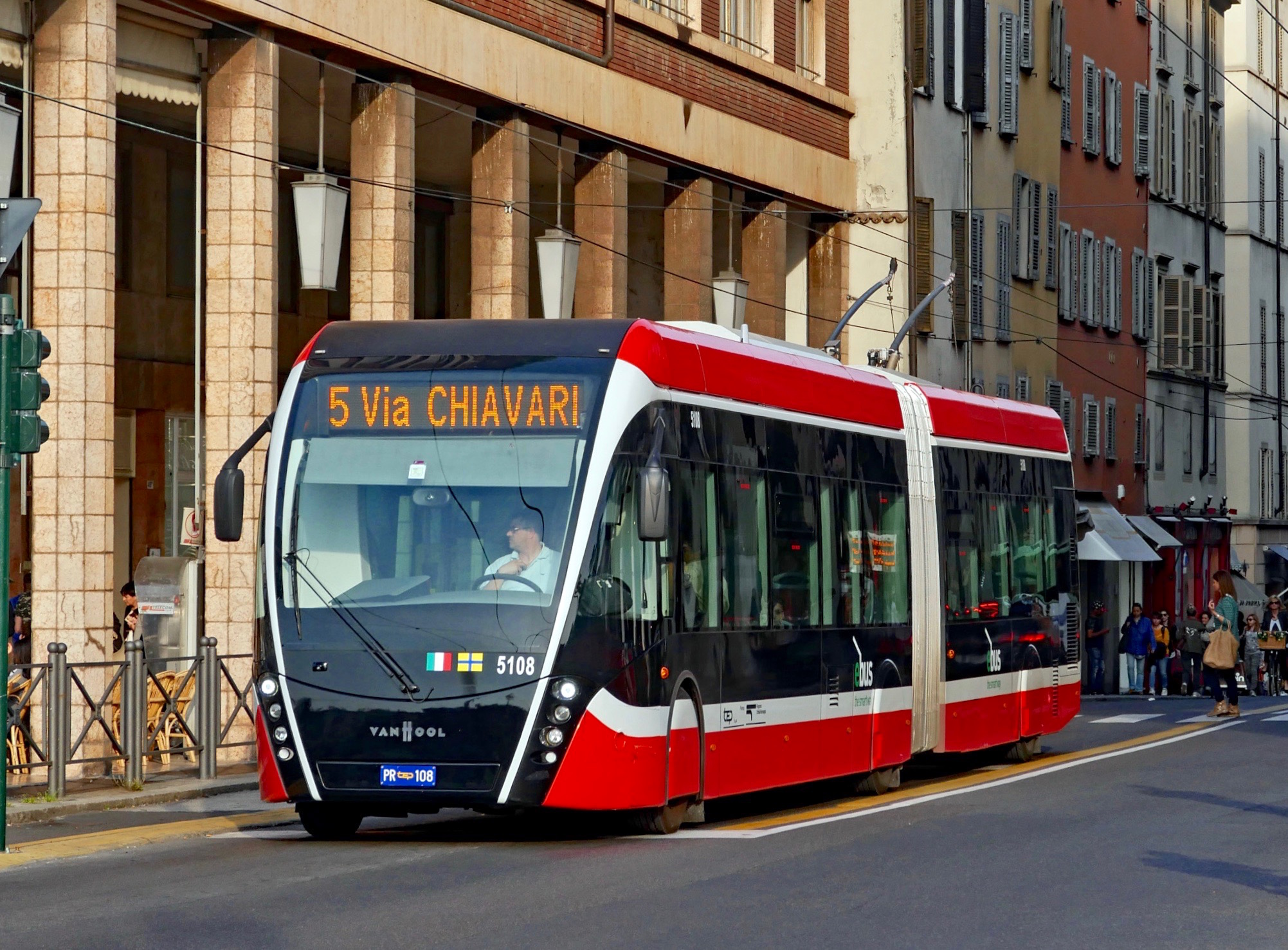
Van Hool ExquiCity 18 trolleybus 5108 on route 5 in 2017

=== Past fleet ===
The following trolleybuses previously used in Parma have since been withdrawn from service:

- 16 Fiat 2401 Cansa delivered 1953, nos. 001-016.
- 2 Fiat 2411 Cansa delivered 1959/1960, nos. 017-018.
- 2 Fiat 2411 Cansa delivered 1964, nos. 019-020.
- 9 Menarini Monocar 201 delivered 1981, nos. 021-030. Withdrawn in 2013.
- 10 Menarini F201/2LU built in 1986–87, nos. 031-040. Last used in 2020, though six remained in the fleet in late 2021. These were the last Menarini-built trolleybuses in service anywhere.

=== Current fleet ===
Parma's current trolleybus fleet is as follows:

- 14 Autodromo BusOtto two-axle low-floor, built 1996/97 (eight vehicles) and 2000, nos. 041–054. The first group, nos. 041-048, were delivered in 1997 and entered service in 1998 and, along with the Bologna system's first articulated Autodromo vehicles, were the first low-floor trolleybuses in Italy.
- 10 Van Hool ExquiCity 18.75-metre (61.5 ft) articulated trolleybuses, built in 2012–13, nos. 5101–5110. The first unit of what was originally an order for nine was delivered in April 2012, and the first vehicles entered service on 23 April 2014, normally used on route 5 only. A tenth vehicle, no. 5110, was purchased in 2014. It was Van Hool's prototype ExquiCity trolleybus, built in 2011, before the other Parma ExquiCity units. It was not originally built for Parma, but had been manufactured to the same specifications as used by TEP.
- 18 Solaris Trollino IV two-axle trolleybuses, nos. 5055–5072. An initial order of ten was delivered in 2020, and the first three entered service on 23 December 2020. Eight more (nos. 5065–5072) were ordered in 2022 and all had been received by September 2023.

=== Heritage fleet ===
Parma trolleybuses nos. 014 and 017 are preserved as heritage vehicles, at the TEP "1° Maggio" depot.

== See also ==
- Parma railway station
- List of trolleybus systems in Italy
