= San Giuliano Milanese railway station =

Railway station in Italy

San Giuliano Milanese

General information
- Location: Via Roma; San Giuliano Milanese, Milan, Lombardy; Italy
- Coordinates: 45°23′29″N 09°17′12″E
- Owner: Rete Ferroviaria Italiana
- Operator: Trenord
- Line: Milan–Bologna
- Distance: 202.610 km (125.896 mi) from Bologna Centrale
- Platforms: 2
- Tracks: 2

Other information
- Fare zone: STIBM: Mi4
- Classification: Silver

History
- Opened: 1931; 95 years ago
- Electrified: 1938

Services
Preceding station	Trenord	Following station
Borgolombardo towards Saronno	Line S1 (Milan suburban railway service)	Melegnano towards Lodi
Borgolombardo towards Cormano–Cusano Milanino	Line S12 (Milan suburban railway service)	Melegnano Terminus
Location
- Location within Lombardy Location within Northern Italy Location within Italy

San Giuliano Milanese railway station is a railway station in Italy. Located on the Milan–Bologna railway, it serves the town of San Giuliano Milanese and is located in Via Roma.

== Services ==
San Giuliano Milanese is served by lines S1 and S12 of the Milan suburban railway service, operated by the Lombard railway company Trenord.

== See also ==
- Milan suburban railway service
