= Fidenza–Fornovo railway =

Railway line in Italy

Overview
- Owner: RFI
- Locale: Emilia-Romagna, Italy
- Termini: Fidenza; Fornovo

Service
- Operator(s): Trenitalia

History
- Opened: 1913

Technical
- Line length: 25 km (16 mi)
- Track gauge: 1,435 mm (4 ft 8 1/2 in) standard gauge
- Electrification: 3000 V DC

The Fidenza–Fornovo railway is an Italian railway line connecting Fidenza and Fornovo di Taro in the Italian region of Emilia-Romagna. It is managed by Rete Ferroviaria Italiana.

== History ==
A concession was granted to build the line to the Consorzio intercomunale della ferrovia Cremona-Borgo San Donnino (inter-municipal consortium of the Cremona-Borgo San Donnino railway) in 1906. In 1907, the consortium subcontracted the construction and operation of the railway to the Società Italiana Ferrovie e Tramvie (Italian Railways and Tramways Society, SIFT), which already managed the line between Cremona and Borgo San Donnino.

The completed line was handed over to the state in 1912 and operations started on 25 November 1913.

Currently the line is used by only three pairs of regional trains (four on weekends) that connect Milan and Bergamo with the Tyrrhenian coast via Fidenza. Local services have not operated since the start of the winter timetable of 2013. Medesano is the only intermediate station still served and it has a very limited passenger service (only one train a day to Livorno and a service to Milan on Friday only).
