= Fornovo railway station =

Railway station in Fornovo di Taro, Italy

Fornovo
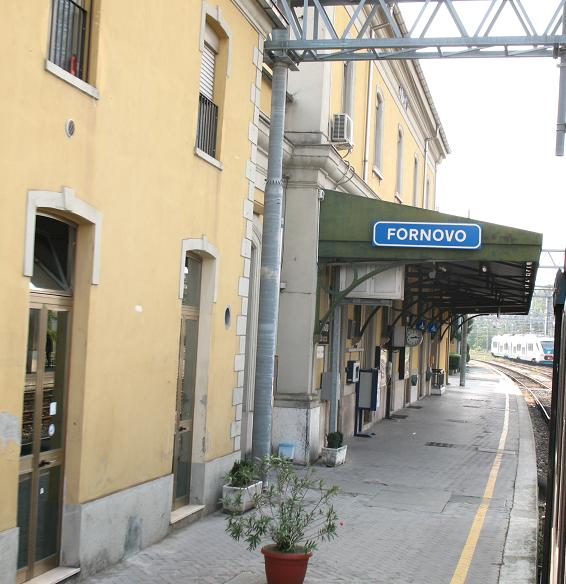

General information
- Location: Via Gramsci; Fornovo di Taro, Parma, Emilia-Romagna
- Coordinates: 44°41′37″N 10°06′07″E
- Operator: Rete Ferroviaria Italiana
- Lines: Parma–La Spezia; Fidenza–Fornovo
- Platforms: 8
- Train operators: Trenitalia

Other information
- Classification: Silver

History
- Opened: 2 July 1883; 143 years ago
- Electrified: 1949; 77 years ago
Location
- Location within Emilia-Romagna Location within Northern Italy Location within Italy

Fornovo railway station (Stazione di Fornovo) is a station that serves the Italian town of Fornovo di Taro. It is located on the Parma–La Spezia railway and the Fidenza–Fornovo railway.

== Buildings and infrastructure ==
The station has three tracks for passenger trains (tracks 1, 3 and 4) served by a platform and connected by an overpass and many other tracks for prolonged stops of freight trains, between 255 and 430 m in length. Trains can continue to Parma (direction indicator "2", single track) or to Fidenza (direction indicator "1", single track). The blocking system is of the automatic block type (with fixed currents) both towards Parma and towards Fidenza, while an "electric axle counter" system is used for trains bound for S. Stefano di Magra (Fornovo–Berceto section).

== Rail services ==
As of 2007, the station was used by 1000 people each day.

== Services ==
The station, which RFI manages and classified in 2008 in the silver category, has:

- ticket machines
- waiting room
- toilets
- bar
- railway police station.

== Interchanges ==
- taxi rank
- bus stop (TEP).
