= San Giuliano Milanese =

- Comune
- Città di San Giuliano Milanese
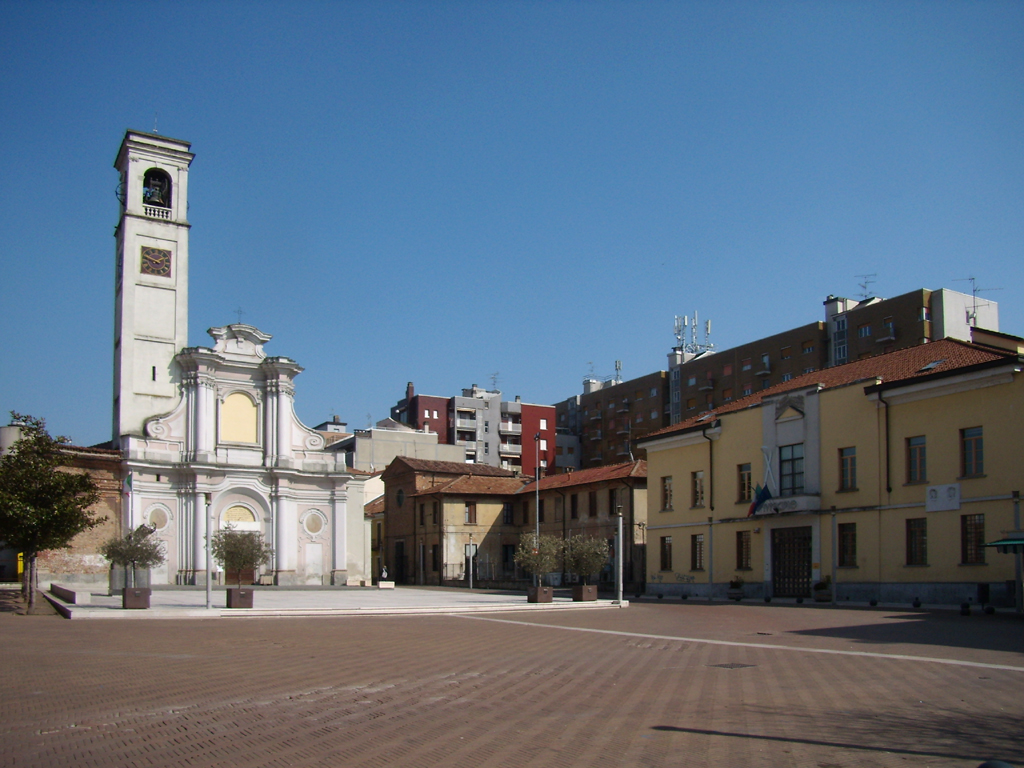

- Coat of arms

- Location within Italy Location within Lombardy
- Coordinates: 45°24′N 9°17′E
- Country: Italy
- Region: Lombardy
- Metropolitan city: Milan (MI)
- Frazioni: Borgolombardo, Carpianello, Civesio, Mezzano, Pedriano, Rancate, Santa Brera, Sesto Ulteriano, Viboldone, Videserto, Zivido

Government
  - Mayor: Marco Segala

Area
  - Total: 30.87 km^{2} (11.92 sq mi)
- Elevation: 97 m (318 ft)

Population (31 May 2023)
  - Total: 39,446
  - Density: 1,278/km^{2} (3,310/sq mi)
- Demonym: Sangiulianesi
- Time zone: UTC+1 (CET)
  - Summer (DST): UTC+2 (CEST)
- Postal code: 20098
- Dialing code: 02
- Website: Official website

San Giuliano Milanese (Milanese: San Giulian) is a comune (municipality) in the Metropolitan City of Milan in the Italian region Lombardy, located about 12 kilometres (7 miles) southeast of Milan. It received the honorary title of city with a presidential decree on April 24, 2000.

The frazione of Viboldone is home to the historical Abbey of Viboldone.

The town is served by the Borgolombardo and San Giuliano Milanese railway stations.

== Twin towns and sister cities ==
San Giuliano Milanese is twinned with:

- Bussy-Saint-Georges, France, since 2001
- Curtea de Argeş, Romania, since 2003
