= Milan–Bologna railway =

Key northern Italian transport link

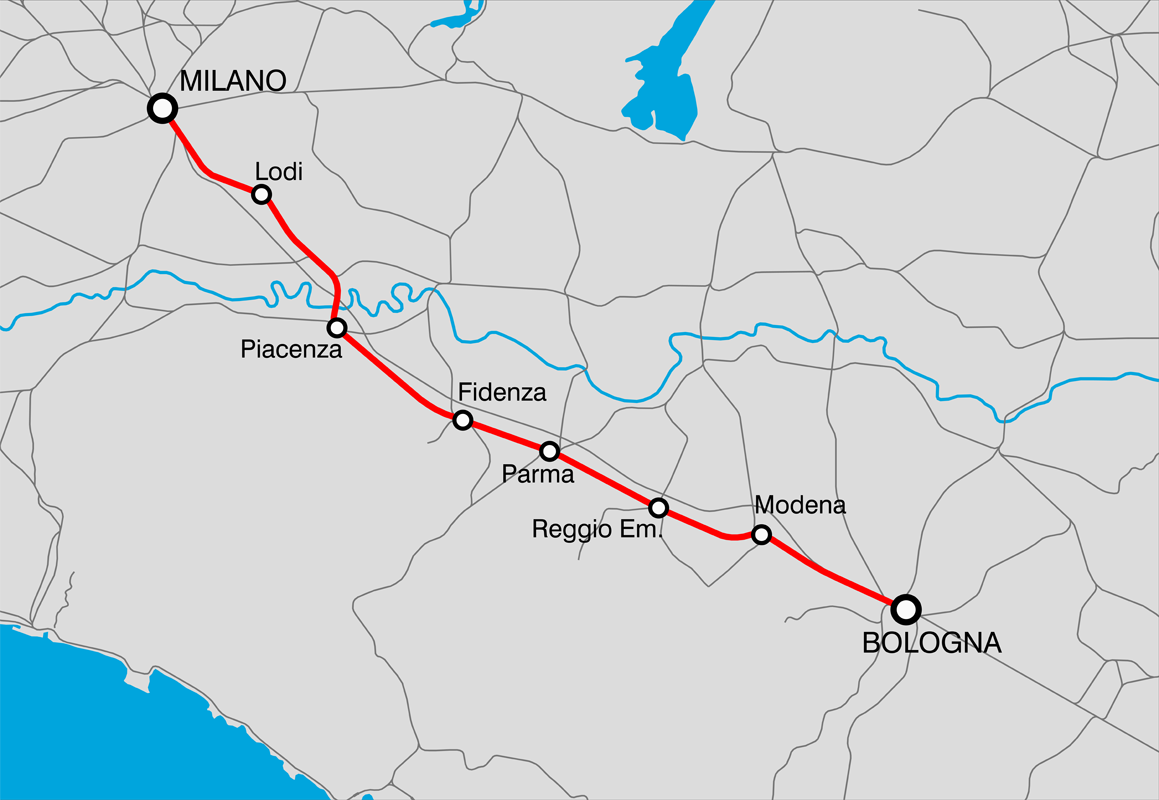
- Map of the railway line

Overview
- Owner: RFI
- Locale: Lombardy and Emilia-Romagna, Italy
- Termini: Milan; Bologna

Service
- Operator(s): Trenitalia

History
- Opened: 1859 (Piacenza–Bologna); 1861 (Milano–Piacenza)

Technical
- Number of tracks: 2
- Track gauge: 1,435 mm (4 ft 8 1/2 in) standard gauge
- Electrification: Electrified at 3000 V DC

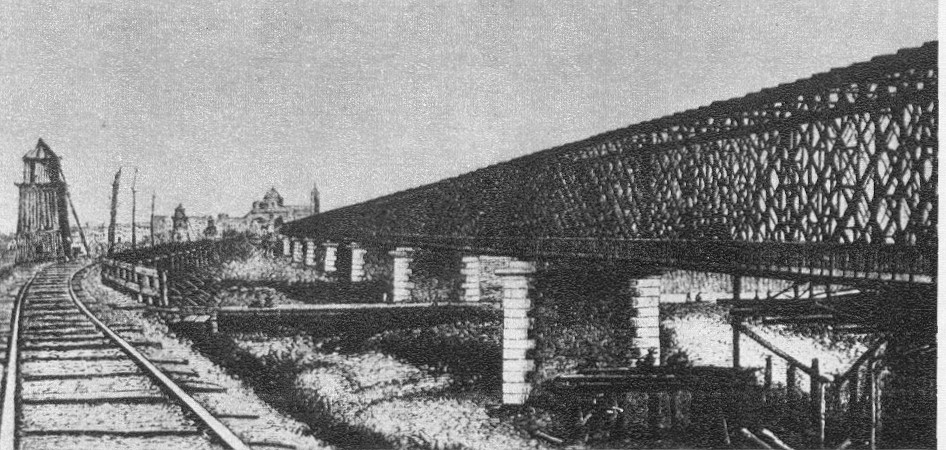
The long steel girder bridge over the Po at its opening in 1865 beside the temporary wooden bridge

The Milan–Bologna railway is the northern part of the traditional main north–south trunk line of the Italian railway network. It closely follows the ancient Roman Road, the Via Aemilia. The line was opened between 1859 and 1861 as a single-line railway, and was doubled between 1866 and 1894. It was electrified at 3,000 volts DC in 1938. High-speed trains on the route have used the parallel Milan–Bologna high-speed line since 13 December 2008.

== History ==
The Milan–Bologna line was not built as it is now but was created out of the merger of two existing lines built at different times and for different purposes: it was formed by linking the line from Milan towards Piacenza with the line from Turin through Piacenza to Bologna, Florence and Rome.

The Kingdom of Lombardy–Venetia was until 1859 still part of the Austrian Empire and conceived concessions for the construction of railways, not so much for its commercial advantages as for military purposes and to bring together the various geographical regions of the empire. As early as September 1835 the Venice Chamber of Commerce had asked permission to form a company for the construction and operation of a railway line from Venice to Milan, but found it very difficult to obtain this "privilege".

Section	Opening
Piacenza-Bologna	21 July 1859
Milan-Piacenza	14 November 1861

The first railway in the region, the Milan–Monza line, was opened in 1840. The second line, opened in 1842, was the first section of the Milan–Venice line, fully completed in 1857. By that time railways were proliferating even in the Piedmont; in 1859 when Austria declared war on Sardinia the Piedmontese and Austrian networks had come close to the point where the bridge over the Ticino was subsequently built connecting Turin and Milan.

The Austrians were defeated and on 11 July 1859 signed the Armistice of Villafranca; Lombardy was annexed to the Kingdom of Sardinia and the Veneto remained Austrian. As a result, the Lombard rail network was separated from that of Austria and therefore the nature of its development and operations changed. Instead of links with Venice, links with central Italy and the Adriatic Sea were promoted. The Treaty of Zürich signed on 10 November 1859 also included an agreement that was the origin of the Società delle Strade Ferrate della Lombardia e dell'Italia Centrale (Lombardy and Central Italy Railway Company) and the Società delle Strade Ferrate dell'Austria meridionale e del Veneto (Southern Austria and Veneto Railway Company). Both companies soon began building new lines and completing others: on 21 July 1859 the 146 km long Piacenza–Bologna line was opened, and on 14 November 1861 the 68 km long Milan-Piacenza section was opened with a temporary wooden bridge over the Po. In 1863 a flood swept away the structures and the line was interrupted several times. The construction of a long steel girder bridge, completed in 1864, put an end to the insecurity of the rail link.

Meanwhile, Piacenza had already been connected to the Piedmont network in 1860 and the important Turin–Bologna–Ancona trunk route was completed in 1861. This line was extended to Foggia in 1863 and Brindisi in 1865. The first crossing of the Apennine between Bologna and Florence, the Porrettana line, was completed in 1863.

In 1865 many small railway companies were merged into four large companies that took over the assets and lines along with the granting of new concessions. The Società delle Strade Ferrate della Lombardia e dell'Italia Centrale was merged with other Alpine and Apennine lines, becoming the Società per le strade ferrate dell'Alta Italia ("Upper Italian Railway", SFAI) with 2,092 km of lines in operation and 300 km under construction or proposed.

In 1871 with the opening of the Fréjus Rail Tunnel to rail traffic, a mail train, the Indian Mail (known in Italian as La Valigia delle Indie) was routed over the line from Piacenza to Bologna; it operated weekly from London and Paris via Modane and Turin to Ancona and Brindisi, where it connected with steamships to India via the Suez Canal. In 1879 this became a passenger train, and later carriages were branded "CIWL" (Compagnie Internationale des Wagons-Lits) by agreement with the operator of the line, the SFAI. The commercial speed of the train, however, remained low at about 40 km/h, due to the condition of the line and its bridges.

The reorganisation of the Italian railways into four companies, however, gave rise to more problems than it solved, so in 1885 the railways were divided between two new companies, the Società per le Strade Ferrate del Mediterraneo — known as the Rete Mediterranea (Mediterranean Network) and comprising the lines west of Milan and on the Tyrrhenian coast, and the railways of Calabria and Basilicata — and the Società Italiana per le strade ferrate meridionali—known as the Rete Adriatica (Adriatic Network), comprising the remaining lines. These networks connected at various stations: Milan, Pavia, Piacenza, Parma, Pisa, Florence, Rome, Naples and Taranto. The Milan–Bologna line had been built as a single track, so it was divided between the two companies: passengers departed from Milan on a Mediterranean Network train and changed at Parma or Piacenza to an Adriatic Network train to reach Bologna.

Starting in 1890 the Adriatic Network agreed to the luxurious P&O express from London to Brindisi operating on the line at up to 80 km/h. The line was later doubled, starting with the Piacenza–Parma section, and access to it was granted to both companies. The doubling started in 1866 and was completed in 1894. The line between Milan to Piacenza was originally not used much, except for local traffic; most travellers preferred to take direct trains between the "capitals" of Turin, Florence and Rome. The first daily direct connection between Milan and Rome started in 1880: the "1" Express. By the end of the century there were about ten expresses from Milan in each direction. The first section (Fornovo–Parma) of the Pontremolese line, connecting the Milan–Bologna line to La Spezia and the Tyrrhenian Sea was opened on 2 July 1883; the line was completed on 12 July 1894.

=== The line under Ferrovie dello Stato ===
When the state railway company, Ferrovie dello Stato, was established it inherited a diverse range of rolling stock from the former rail companies. Track was in a poor condition and the maximum speed on the line was 80 km/h and then only for specially-equipped trains, with slower speeds over bridges and points. Therefore, FS had to proceed with the reconstruction of bridges and viaducts, track and points in the stations, signalling and safety equipment.

Only after this work was finished in the 1910s could the new powerful Italian 690 Pacific steam locomotives be introduced; they were designed specifically for flat and fast lines but had a very high weight per axle compared to locomotives previously used in Italy. In the 1920s improvements to the line finally allowed train operation at up to 100 km/h for the fastest trains. Only in 1929 was the line adequate for loads of 20 tons per axle; even then this required slowing to 20 km/h on the long iron bridge over the Po near Piacenza until its replacement by a new bridge. After its opening, the average commercial speed on the line was raised to 87 km/h.

Starting in 1927, the Milan–Bologna line was the site of the first major trial of in-cab signalling, with the signalling information passed by magnets. This system was designed by the engineer Gino Minucciani. The successful experiment was followed in 1928 by the equipping of the line to Bologna for the repetition of two types of signals: stop and go; if the driver did not comply the braking system would be automatically applied. The 690 locomotives were equipped with this system.

In the late 1920s the limits of steam began to become clear, especially in terms of its high operating costs and its limited potential for further acceleration. It was decided to electrify the line at 3,000 volts direct current following excellent results achieved in experiments, although the Porrettana line between Bologna and Florence had been electrified with a three-phase alternating current system in 1927, and this system was proposed for the new Bologna–Florence direttissima. During the same period the ever-increasing traffic on the line, which had become the primary axis of the Italian railway network, began to saturate the capacity of the stations in Bologna, and a rail bypass was built to its north.

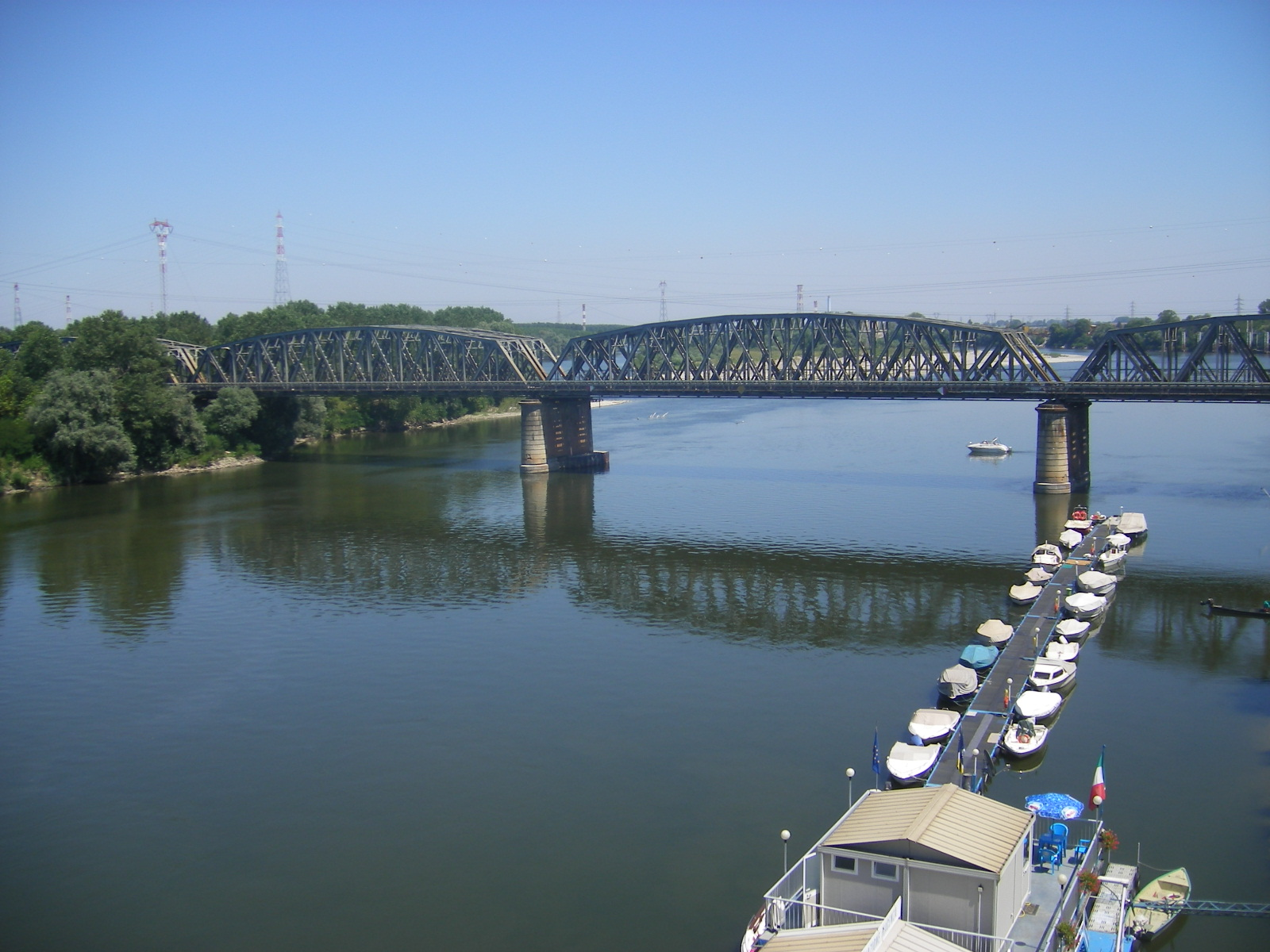
The bridge over the Po built in 1931 and rebuilt after the Second World War.

Following the electrification of the line in 1938, Minucciani's system of in-cab signalling was abandoned because it was considered too expensive to equip the electric locomotives with it. Instead FS tested a new system of automatic block signalling designed by Minucciani on a 110 km stretch of line. Although these tests were successful it was not implemented because investment in that period prioritized the speed and punctuality of trains for propaganda reasons rather than innovation in safety devices. In 1939 a train hauled by ETR 212 travelled from Milan to Bologna in just 77 minutes, while the normal speed for express trains had been reduced to 105 minutes.

=== Recent projects ===
In 1991, a deviation of the line was activated between Milano Rogoredo station and San Giuliano Milanese station, on which the new stations of Borgolombardo and San Donato Milanese were built. (the latter was only opened in 2003). This deviation was necessary to enable the construction of the "fast line" on the alignment of the original line.

The quadrupling of the section between Milano Rogoredo station and Sordio junction, just before San Zenone al Lambro station, was completed in 1997. However, due to the postponement of development work at Milan Rogoredo station, it was not possible to adequately upgrade rail services, in particular the planned suburban railway service.

In 2002, work began on the construction of the Milan–Bologna high-speed railway, which connects to the old line in the municipality of San Zenone al Lambro. The line from there to Milan had already been quadrupled. The high-speed line was opened in 2008, after the interconnection in Tavazzano was completed on 29 May 2005.

The line from Milan Rogoredo to Lodi has been served by line S1 of the Milan suburban railway service since 13 December 2009.

== Infrastructure ==
The line has two tracks built to 1,435 mm (4 ft 8 1/2 in) standard gauge, electrified at 3 kV DC, authorised for a maximum axle weight of 22.5 tonnes per axle, with a maximum grade on the Lombard section of 1.2% and authorised for a maximum speed of 230 km/h.

=== Route ===
The line starts at Milano Centrale and runs along the belt railway, along with the lines to Venice and Genoa, passing through the stations of Milano Lambrate (where it separates from the line for Venice), Milano Forlanini and Milano Rogoredo, where it separates from the line for Genoa. The line between Rogoredo and San Giuliano Milanese has been doubled since 1991 with the construction of the fast line on the historic route and the building of the stations of San Donato Milanese (which was not actually opened until 2003) and Borgolombardo.

Since 1997, the line to Sordio junction (before San Zenone al Lambro) has been quadrupled by the construction of a new line that bypasses the town of Melegnano and that is used by traffic to and from the high-speed line. Shortly after Melegnano, the historic line and the new line cross the river Lambro on two separate bridges. After San Zenone, the line passes through Tavazzano station, which, since 2005, has been linked by the Interconnessione di Tavazzano (Tavazzano interconnection) between the historic line and the new line that it used by high-speed traffic.

The section between Casalpusterlengo and Codogno is shared with the Pavia–Cremona railway. After Santo Stefano Lodigiano station, the railway crosses the Po in Piacenza over a bridge. which was built in 1931 and 1932 and replaced the previous single track bridge built in 1865; it consists of 11 pairs of iron beams, with a parabolic upper arch, six of these have a span of 74.52 m, and five of 61.02. Lines branch off in Piacenza to Alessandria and Cremona.

Near the city there are two links with the high-speed line: the Piacenza west interconnection, located just before the bridge over the Po and the Piacenza east interconnection, located just after the city.

After Piacenza the railway runs parallel to the Via Emilia (state highway 9) passing through Pontenure, Cadeo, Fiorenzuola d'Arda and Alseno. It enters the territory of Province of Parma, at Fidenza, where lines branch off to Cremona, Fornovo and Salsomaggiore Terme and there is an interconnection with the high-speed line. The next station, Castelguelfo has a freight yard. The line arrives at Parma where lines branch off to La Spezia, Brescia and Suzzara, while to the east of the city, there is another interconnection with the high-speed line. The line enters the Province of Reggio Emilia, which is the location of the stations of Sant'Ilario d'Enza, Reggio Emilia (the terminus of the three lines of the Ferrovie Reggiane) and Rubiera. The line enters the Province of Modena, where the lines to Mantua and Modena, and Sassuolo branch off in Modena station.

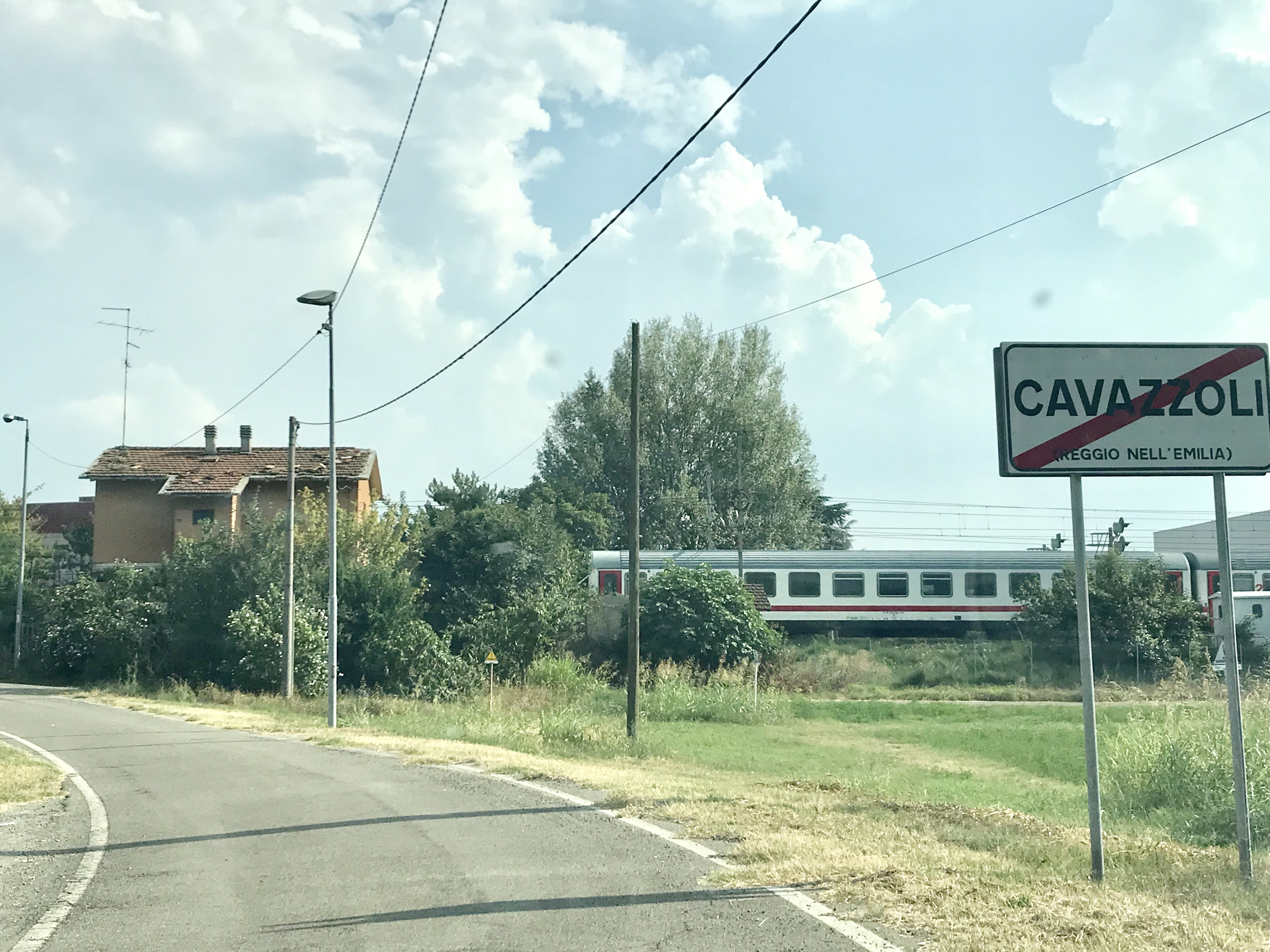
Frecciabianca service passing through Cavazzoli, Reggio Emilia

In November 2014, a deviation was opened between Rubiera and Modena that is more than 8.5 kilometres long, including an almost 2 km-long tunnel. This was built as part of the construction of the high-speed line and the simultaneous upgrade of the traditional line. The new route, located farther north than previously, avoids crossing the western part of Modena and is connected to the Verona line by means of a link line. Marzaglia freight yard was opened on the new line. In Modena there are also two interconnections with the high-speed railway, one to the west and one to the east of the city. After Castelfranco Emilia, the railway enters the Metropolitan City of Bologna, which includes the stations of Samoggia and Anzola dell'Emilia. The last interconnection with the high-speed line is near Lavino junction. In the last kilometres before Bologna Centrale station, where the line ends, the railway runs parallel to the lines from Verona and Pistoia.

== See also ==
- List of railway lines in Italy
