= Melegnano railway station =

Railway station in Italy

Melegnano
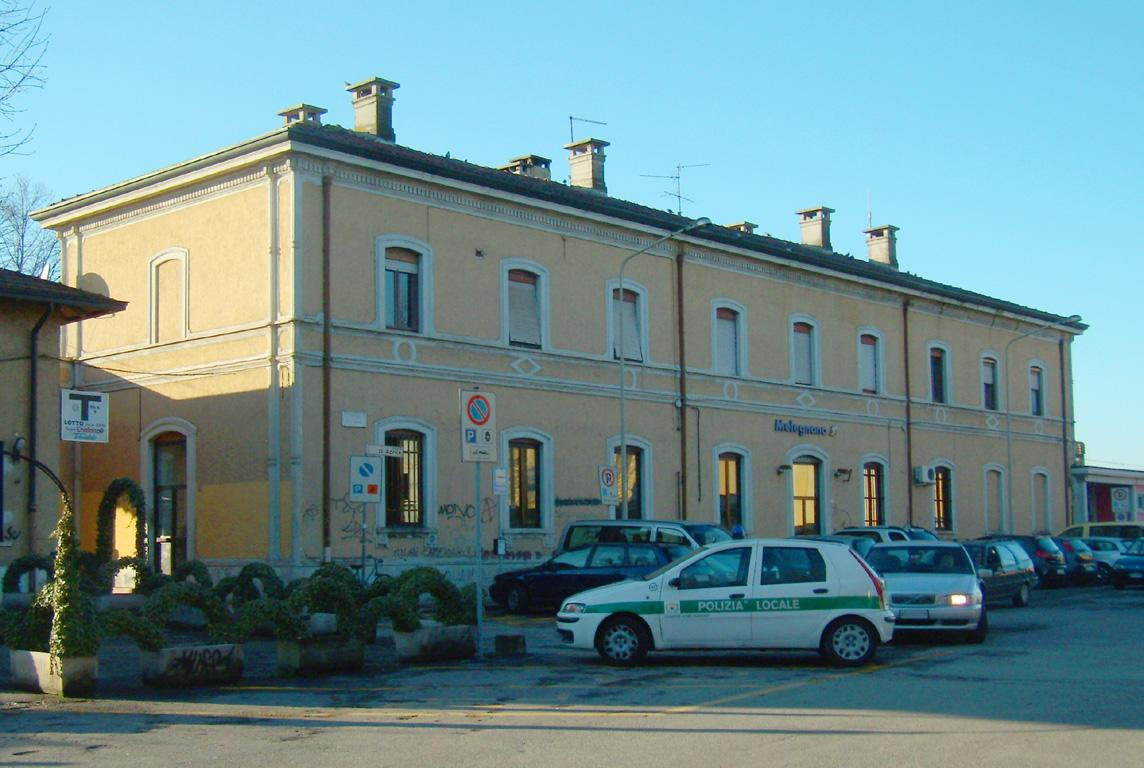

General information
- Location: Piazza XXV Aprile 3 Melegnano, Milan, Lombardy; Italy
- Coordinates: 45°21′23″N 09°19′10″E
- Owner: Rete Ferroviaria Italiana
- Operator: Trenord
- Line: Milan–Bologna
- Distance: 197.912 km (122.977 mi) from Bologna Centrale
- Platforms: 2
- Tracks: 2

Other information
- Fare zone: STIBM: Mi5
- Classification: Silver

History
- Opened: November 14, 1861; 164 years ago
- Electrified: 1938

Services
Preceding station	Trenord	Following station
San Giuliano Milanese towards Saronno	Line S1 (Milan suburban railway service)	San Zenone al Lambro towards Lodi
San Giuliano Milanese towards Cormano–Cusano Milanino	Line S12 (Milan suburban railway service)	Terminus
Location
- Location within Lombardy Location within Northern Italy Location within Italy

Melegnano railway station is a railway station in Italy. Located on the Milan–Bologna railway, it serves the town of Melegnano.

== Services ==
Melegnano is served by lines S1 and S12 of the Milan suburban railway service, operated by the Lombard railway company Trenord.

== See also ==
- Milan suburban railway service
