= Melegnano =

- Comune
- Città di Melegnano
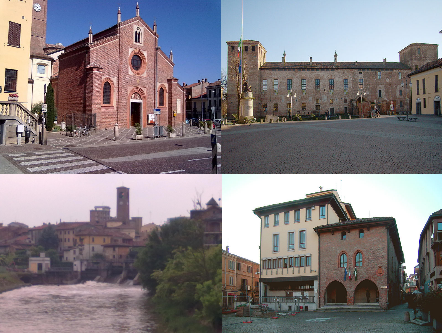

- Coat of arms

- Location within Italy Location within Lombardy
- Coordinates: 45°22′N 09°19′E
- Country: Italy
- Region: Lombardy
- Metropolitan city: Milan (MI)

Government
  - Mayor: Rodolfo Bertoli (Partito Democratico))

Area
  - Total: 4 km^{2} (1.5 sq mi)

Population (31 March 2024)
  - Total: 18,032
  - Density: 4,500/km^{2} (12,000/sq mi)
- Time zone: UTC+1 (CET)
  - Summer (DST): UTC+2 (CEST)
- Postal code: 20077
- Dialing code: 02
- Website: Official website

Melegnano (formerly Marignano; Lombard: Meregnan [mereˈɲãː]) is a comune and town in the Metropolitan City of Milan, Lombardy, northern Italy. The town lies 16 kilometres (10 mi) southeast of the city of Milan. It received the honorary title of city with a presidential decree on 26 August 1959.

The town is served by the Melegnano railway station.

== History ==
Melegnano was a stronghold of Milan in the Italian Wars, and known particularly for the Battle of Marignano, a victory over the Swiss in 1515. It is also known for the battles between the French and Austrians in the Second Italian War of Independence (1859).

== Twin towns ==
Melegnano is twinned with:

- Paullo, Italy, since 2007
- Paris, France, since 2009

== Main sights ==
- Church of St. John the Baptist, housing an oil painting by Borgognone.
- Medici Castle, with frescoed halls depicting military deeds of the Medici and views of German cities and of Lake Como.
- Parchetto of Melegnano, with trees and benches famous for the old people created by Leonardo da Vinci
