= La Spezia Centrale railway station =

Railway station in La Spezia, Italy

La Spezia Centrale
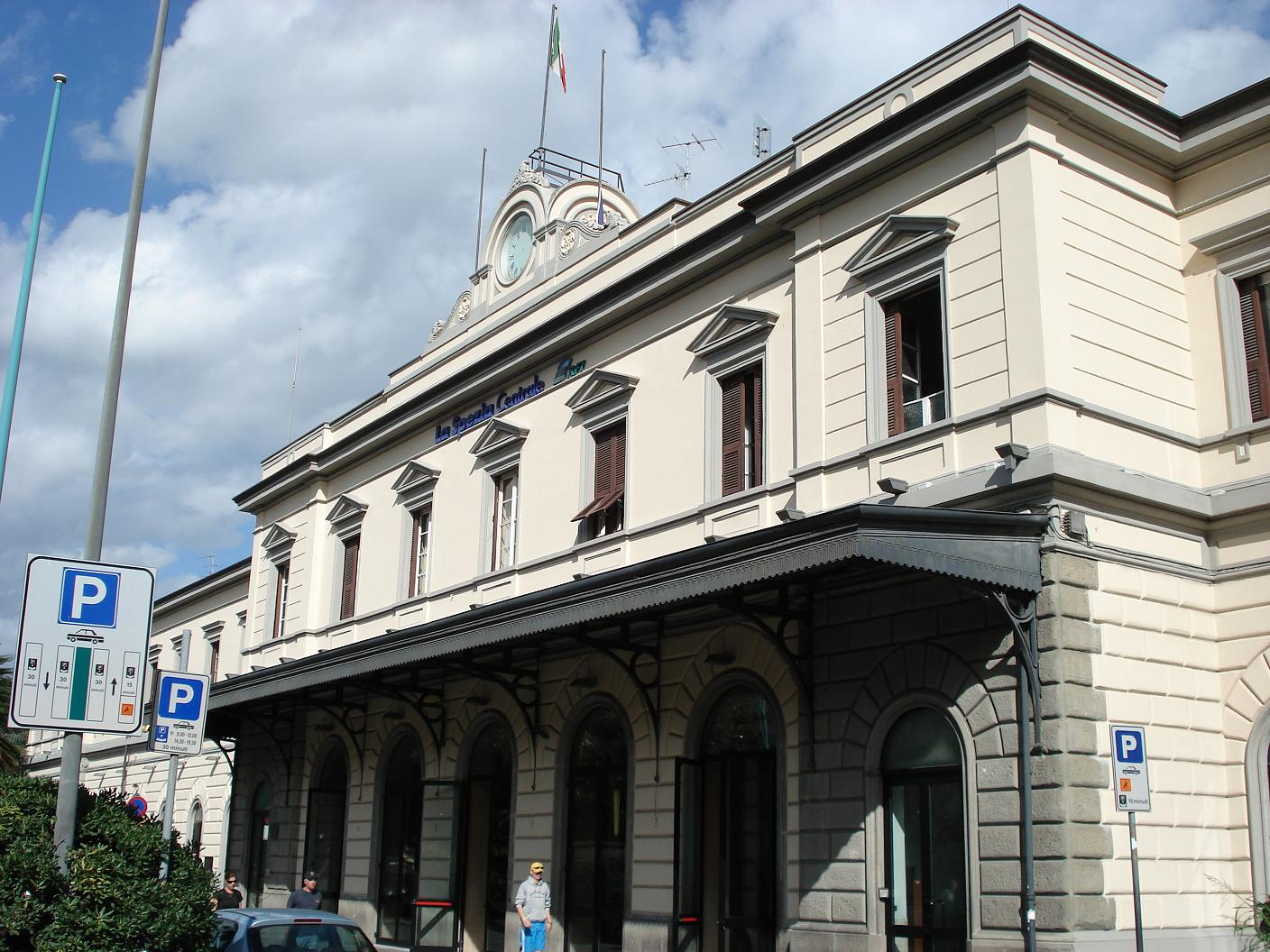
- La Spezia Centrale station

General information
- Location: Piazza Medaglie d’Oro; 19121 La Spezia SP; La Spezia, La Spezia, Liguria; Italy
- Coordinates: 44°06′42″N 9°48′49″E
- Elevation: 16 m (52 ft)
- Operator: Rete Ferroviaria Italiana; Centostazioni
- Lines: (Rome-) Pisa-La Spezia-Genoa; Parma-La Spezia
- Distance: 86.162 km (53.539 mi) from Genova Piazza Principe
- Train operators: Trenitalia
- Connections: Urban and suburban buses La Spezia trolleybuses

Other information
- IATA code: QLP
- Classification: Gold
- Website: www.rfi.it/en/stations/la-spezia-centrale.html

History
- Opened: 1887; 139 years ago
Location
- Location within Liguria Location within Northern Italy Location within Italy

La Spezia Centrale railway station is the main station of La Spezia, situated in the Piazza Medaglie d’Oro in the city centre.

== Overview ==
It is the largest of four stations in the municipal area (there are also passenger stations at La Spezia Migliarina and Ca' di Boschetti and a goods station (La Spezia Marittima) inside the port of La Spezia). The station is located on the line from Genoa to Pisa, which runs along the Tyrrhenian Sea. It is also the terminus of the Pontremolese railway to Parma. It has four platforms.

La Spezia Centrale is also a gateway station for the famous Cinque Terre UNESCO area. The Cinque Terre Express runs between La Spezia and Levanto and all the Cinque Terre towns in between.

== History ==
The station was inaugurated in 1887, replacing the Valdellora station that had served La Spezia since the railway was extended there from Massa on 4 August 1864. Valdellora station became a goods yard. The new Centrale railway station meant that the new neighborhood of Umbertino, then under construction, became the centre of La Spezia.

== Gallery ==
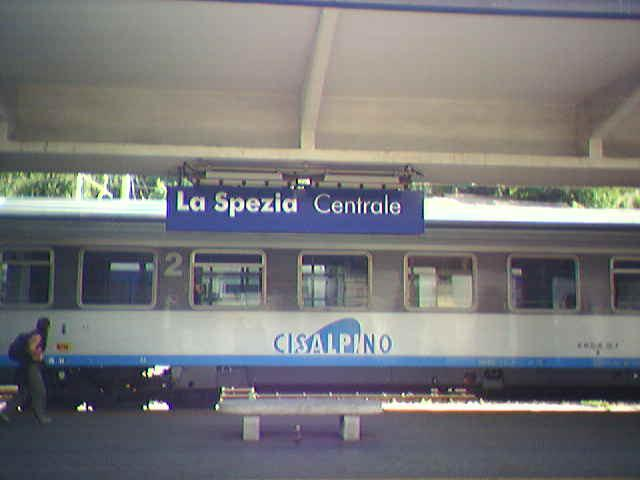
Cisalpino train from Zürich

== See also ==
- History of rail transport in Italy
- List of railway stations in Tuscany
- Rail transport in Italy
- Railway stations in Italy
