= Marco Giovanni Piuri =

Italian business executive (born 1960)

- Born: 1960 (age 64–65); Saronno, Italy
- Education: Catholic University of the Sacred Heart
- Occupation: Business executive
- Known for: General manager of Ferrovie Nord Milano

Marco Giovanni Piuri (Saronno, 1960) is an Italian executive currently serving as the general manager of Ferrovie Nord Milano. He has held several key positions within the group, including general manager of FNM S.p.A. (2002–2008); CEO of LeNord S.r.l. (2002–2008); CEO of Ferrovienord S.p.A. (2002–2008), CEO of Trenord (2008–2024).

== Early life and education ==
Born in Saronno, in the province of Varese, in 1960, Marco Giovanni Piuri graduated summa cum laude in Economics and Business from the Catholic University of the Sacred Heart in Milan.

== Career ==
After gaining experience as a management consultant in strategy and organization, Piuri joined the FNM Group in 1998 as Strategic Development Director. Over the years, he held several key positions within the group, including general manager of FNM S.p.A. (2002–2008); CEO of LeNord S.r.l. (2002–2008); CEO of Ferrovienord S.p.A. (2002–2008).

In 2008, Piuri joined Arriva Group, part of Deutsche Bahn, where he became Divisional Director for Southern, Central, and Eastern Europe and a member of the management board in London. From September 2018 to November 2024, he served as CEO of Trenord, Lombardy’s leading regional rail operator.

After completing his tenure at Trenord, Piuri decided to focus entirely on his role as general manager of FNM, a position he has held since December 2018.

In 2024, he launched the PARI – Together Against Gender Violence project. Additionally, he supported the MAAM – Maternity as a Master program, which focuses on the skills employees develop through parenthood. FNM and Trenord were the first Italian railway companies to implement this program.

=== FNM Group ===
Under Marco Piuri’s leadership, FNM Group implemented two distinct strategic plans:

- The 2021-2025 Strategic Plan introduced H2iseO, one of Europe’s first Hydrogen Valleys, and prioritized ESG goals, including emission reduction and energy transition. It allocated €850 million for infrastructure, fleet modernization, and digital mobility services.
- Strategic Plan 2024-2029: The subsequent plan emphasized decarbonization and the expansion of renewable energy, with a target of producing 650 GWh from renewable sources by 2029.
