= Brescia–Iseo–Edolo railway =

Railway line in Italy

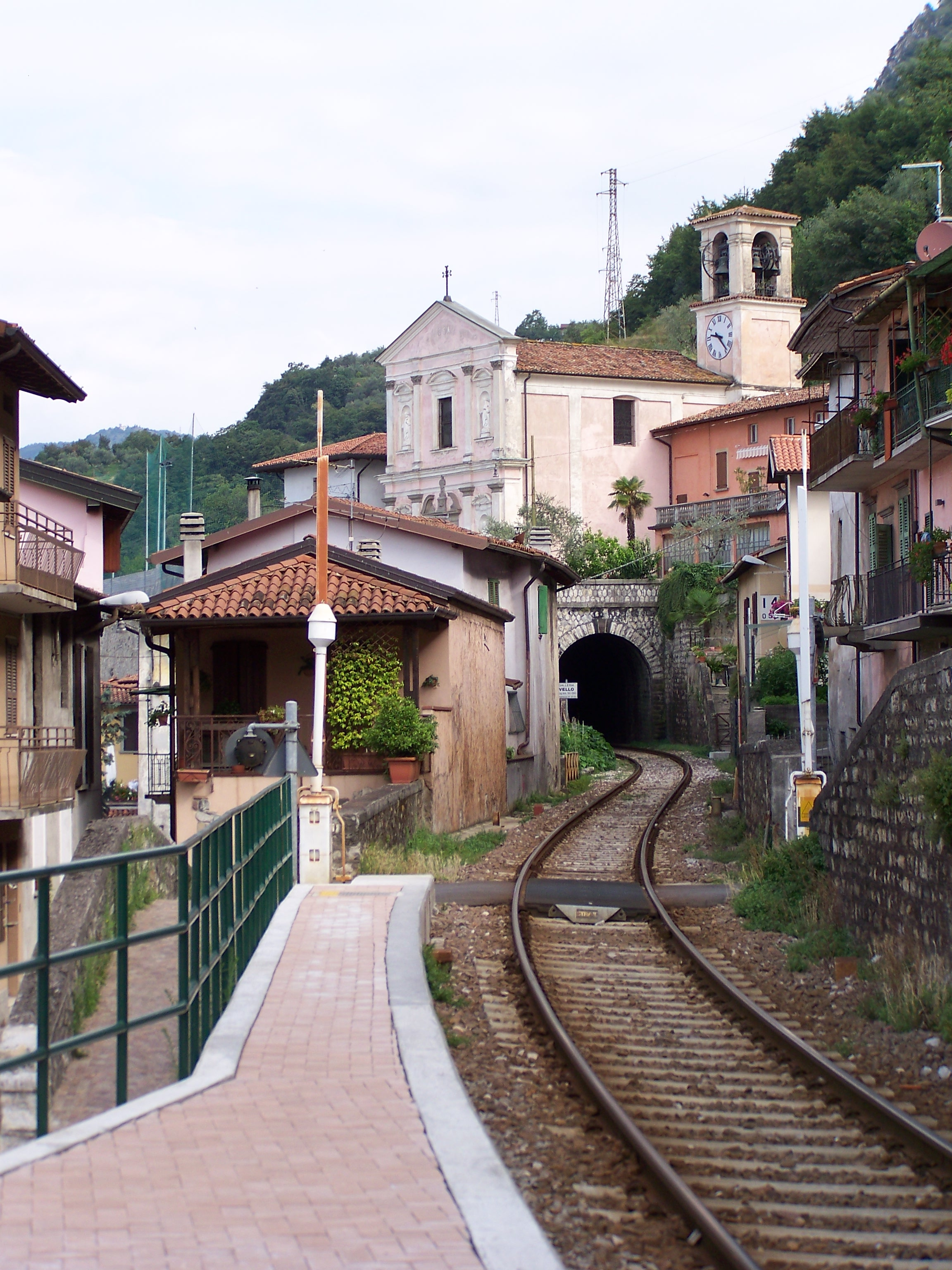
- The Brescia–Iseo–Edolo railway line at Vello

Overview
- Native name: Ferrovia Brescia–Iseo–Edolo
- Status: in use
- Owner: Ferrovienord
- Locale: Lombardy, Italy
- Termini: Brescia railway station; Iseo railway station, Edolo railway station
- Stations: 30

Service
- Type: heavy rail
- Services: R3, RE3, R9, S31
- Operator: Trenord

History
- Opened: 21 June 1885

Technical
- Line length: 104 km (65 mi)
- Num of tracks: 1
- Track gauge: 1,435 mm (4 ft 8 1/2 in) standard gauge
- Electrification: no

The Brescia–Iseo–Edolo railway (Italian: Ferrovia Brescia–Iseo–Edolo) is a 104 km (65 mi) long regional railway line connecting the towns of Brescia, Iseo, and Edolo, in Lombardy, northern Italy. The railway links the Valcamonica valley and the Lake Iseo with the city of Brescia and the rest of the Italian railway network.

Established in sections between 1885 and 1909, the railway line is standard gauge, single track and un-electrified. The line is currently owned by the region of Lombardy and managed by the rail infrastructure manager Ferrovienord. Train services on the line are operated by the regional railway company Trenord.

== History ==
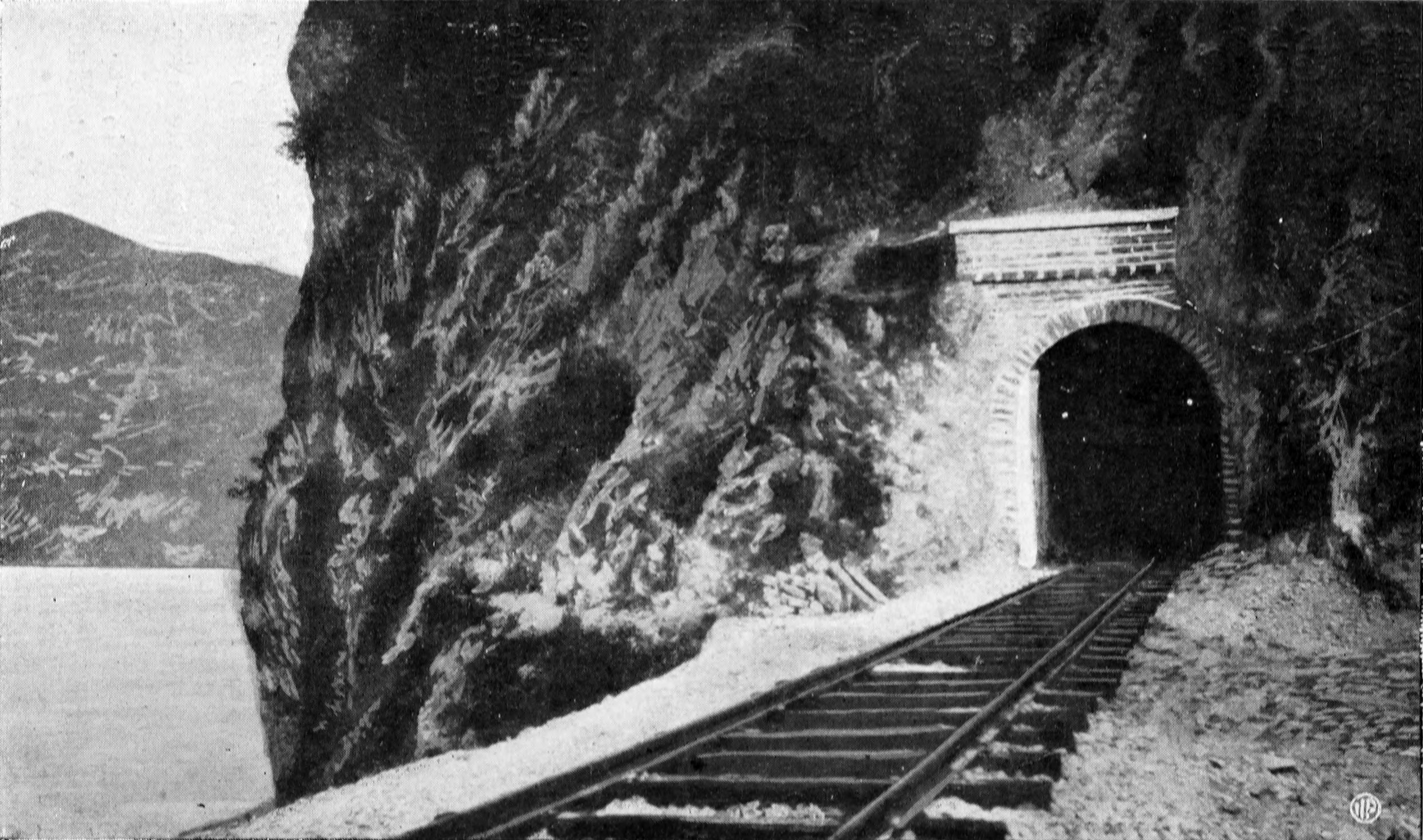
Entrance to a tunnel between Vello and Toline.

The 24 km (15 mi) long railway line between Brescia and Iseo was opened on 21 June 1885.

A concession for the construction of a railway line through the Valcamonica was granted by the state to the province of Brescia in 1900, which then passed the concession on to the Società Nazionale Ferrovie e Tramvie (SNFT) in 1904. The 22 km (14 mi) long section from Iseo to Pisogne opened on 8 July 1907, the 25 km (16 mi) long section from Pisogne to Breno on 29 December 1907, and the last 31 km (19 mi) long section from Breno to Edolo on 4 July 1909.

In October 1907, thanks to an agreement with the Ferrovie dello Stato (FS), the SNFT also obtained the operation of the Brescia–Iseo line which made a direct connection from Brescia to the Valcamonica possible.

A railway line between Iseo and Rovato on the Milan–Venice railway opened on 3 September 1911 as the first section of the now partly defunct Cremona–Iseo railway. Served by the line R9 of Trenord, the service between Iseo and Rovato Borgo was suspended in 2018.

== Route ==
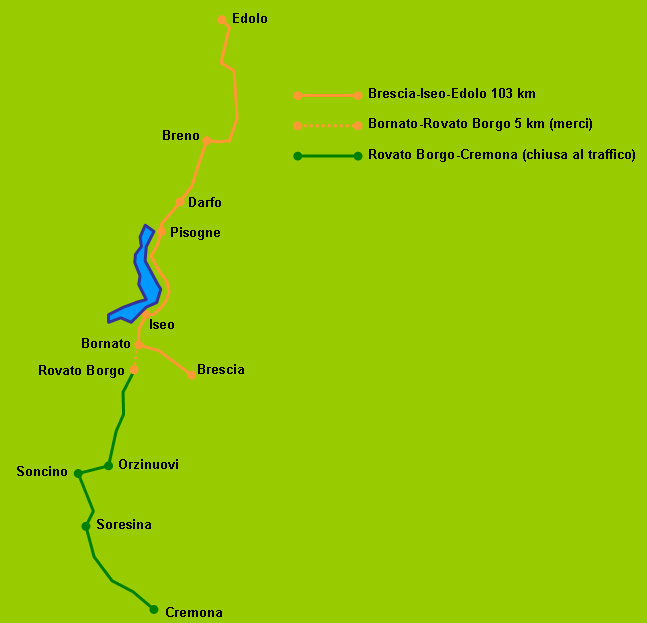
Map of the Brescia–Iseo–Edolo and the now partly defunct Cremona–Iseo railway.

Map of the Brescia–Iseo section of the Brescia–Iseo–Edolo.

The railway line initially runs northwest from Brescia to Bornato-Calino which is the junction with the short branch line to Rovato. The line then continues north to Iseo, from where it continues north along the eastern shore of the Lake Iseo until Pisogne. From Pisogne it continues north along the River Oglio through the Valcamonica valley of the Central Alps until it reaches Edolo at the foot of the Aprica Pass and the Tonale Pass.

== Operations ==
Train service plan for the Brescia–Iseo–Edolo line as of 2 September 2025.

The Brescia–Iseo–Edolo is currently owned by the region of Lombardy and managed by the rail infrastructure manager Ferrovienord, a subsidiary of Ferrovie Nord Milano. Train services on the line are operated by the regional railway company Trenord, which runs frequent regional and local train services on the line.

== Gallery ==
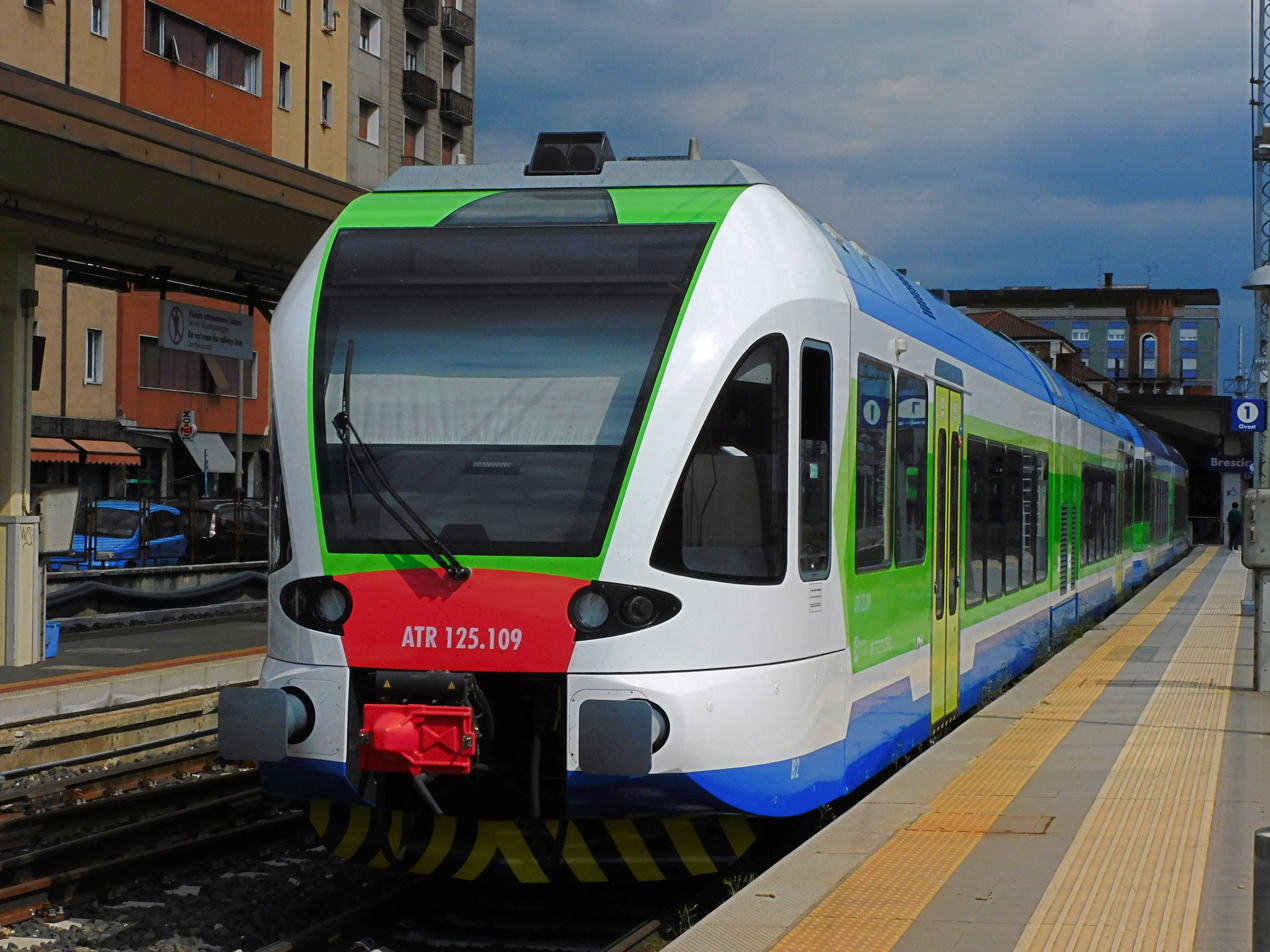
Train at Brescia

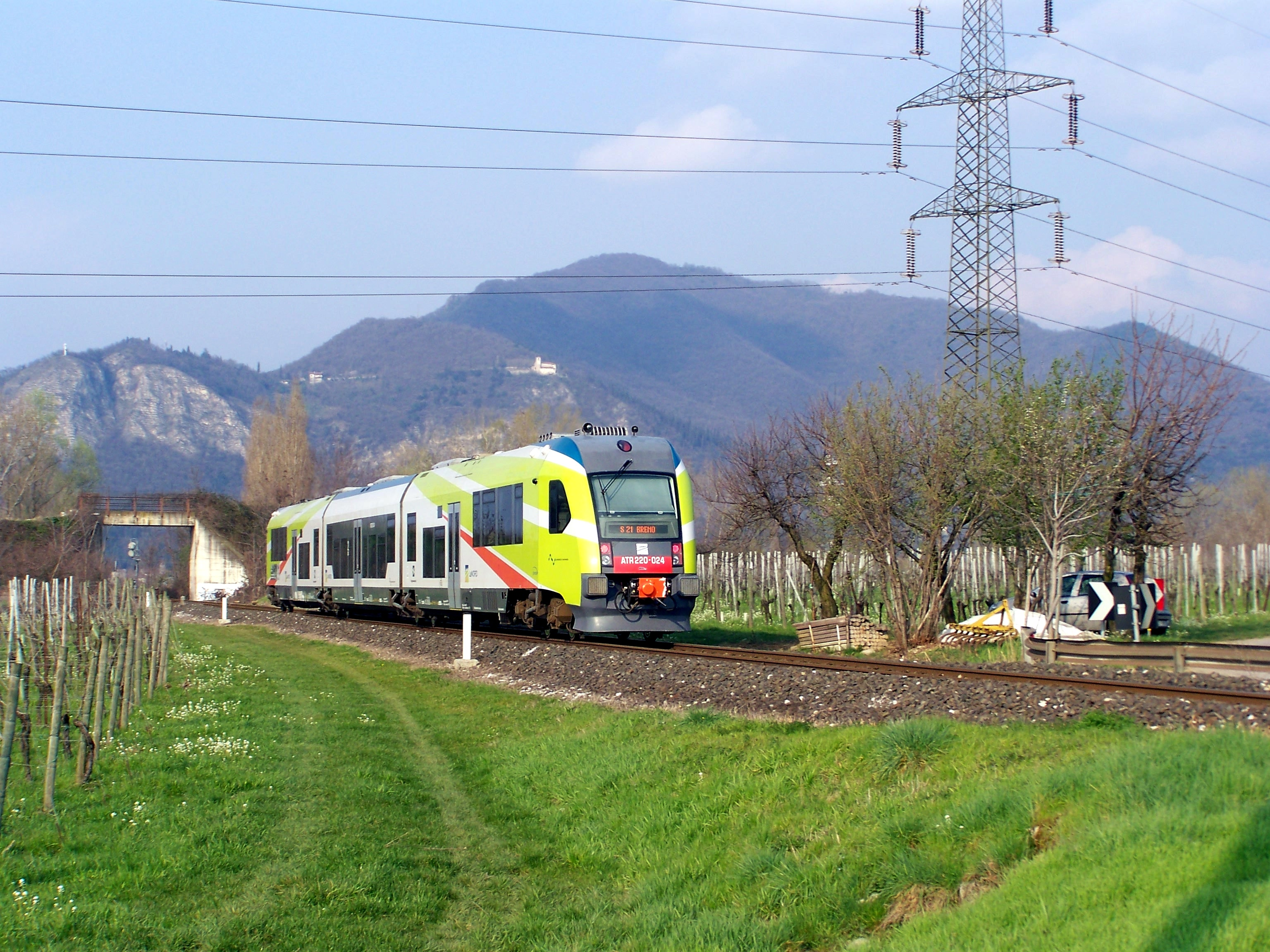
The railway line near Borgonato

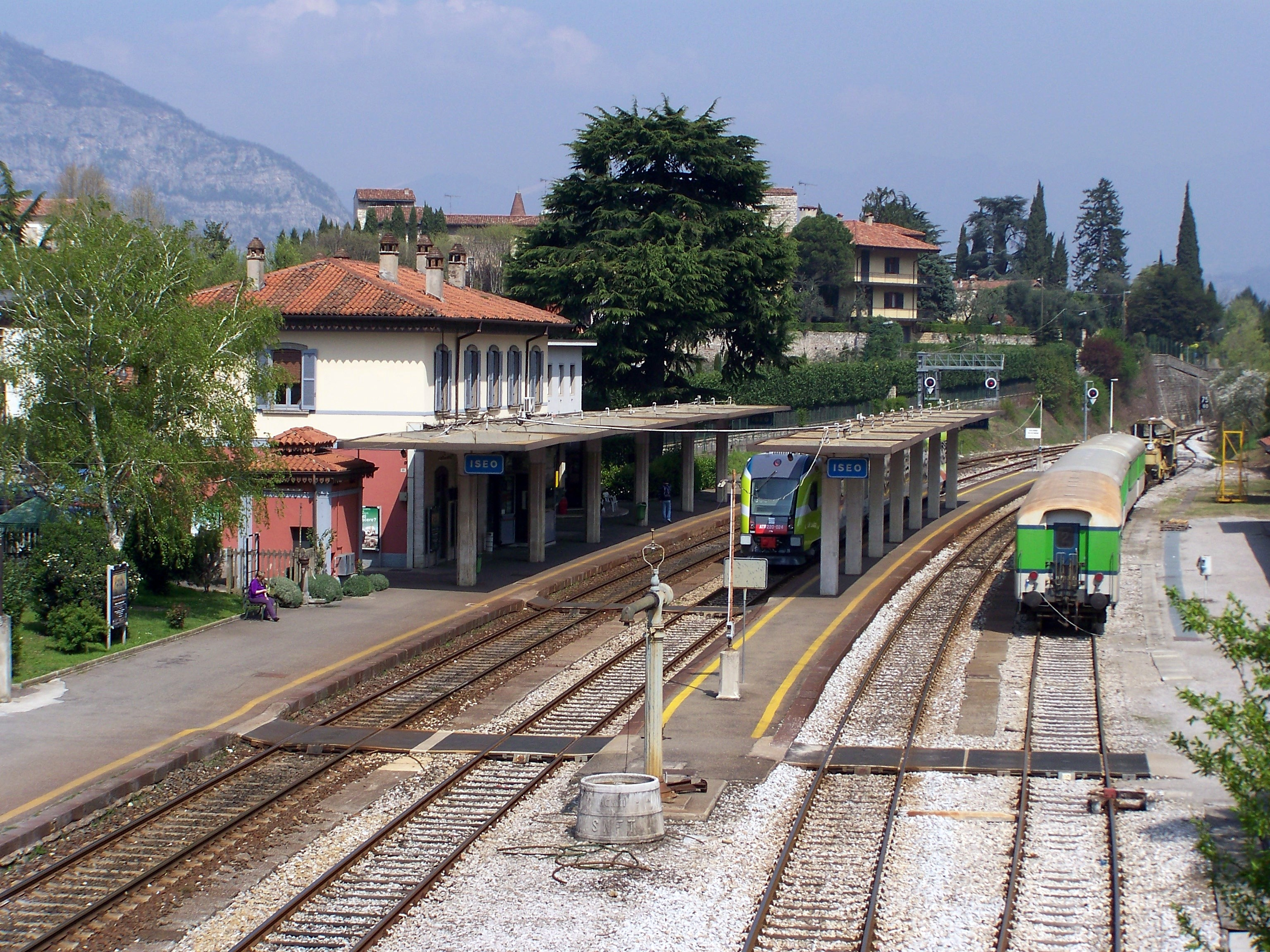
Trains at Iseo

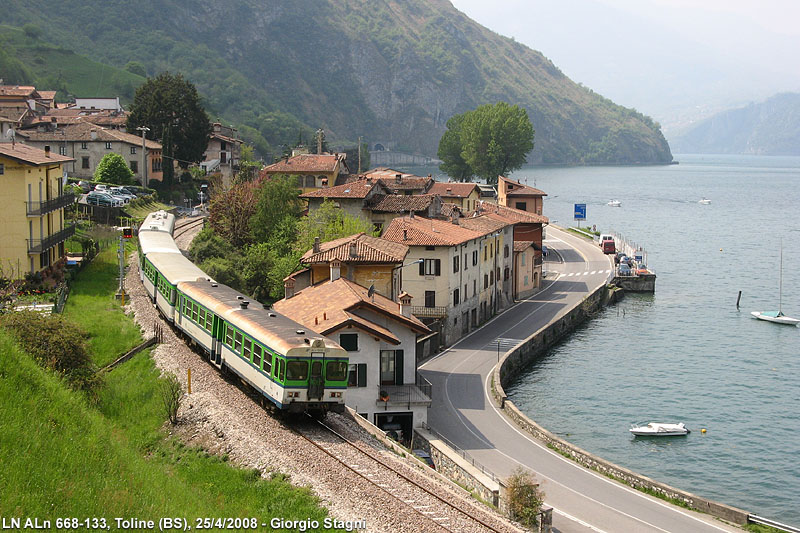
The railway line at Toline

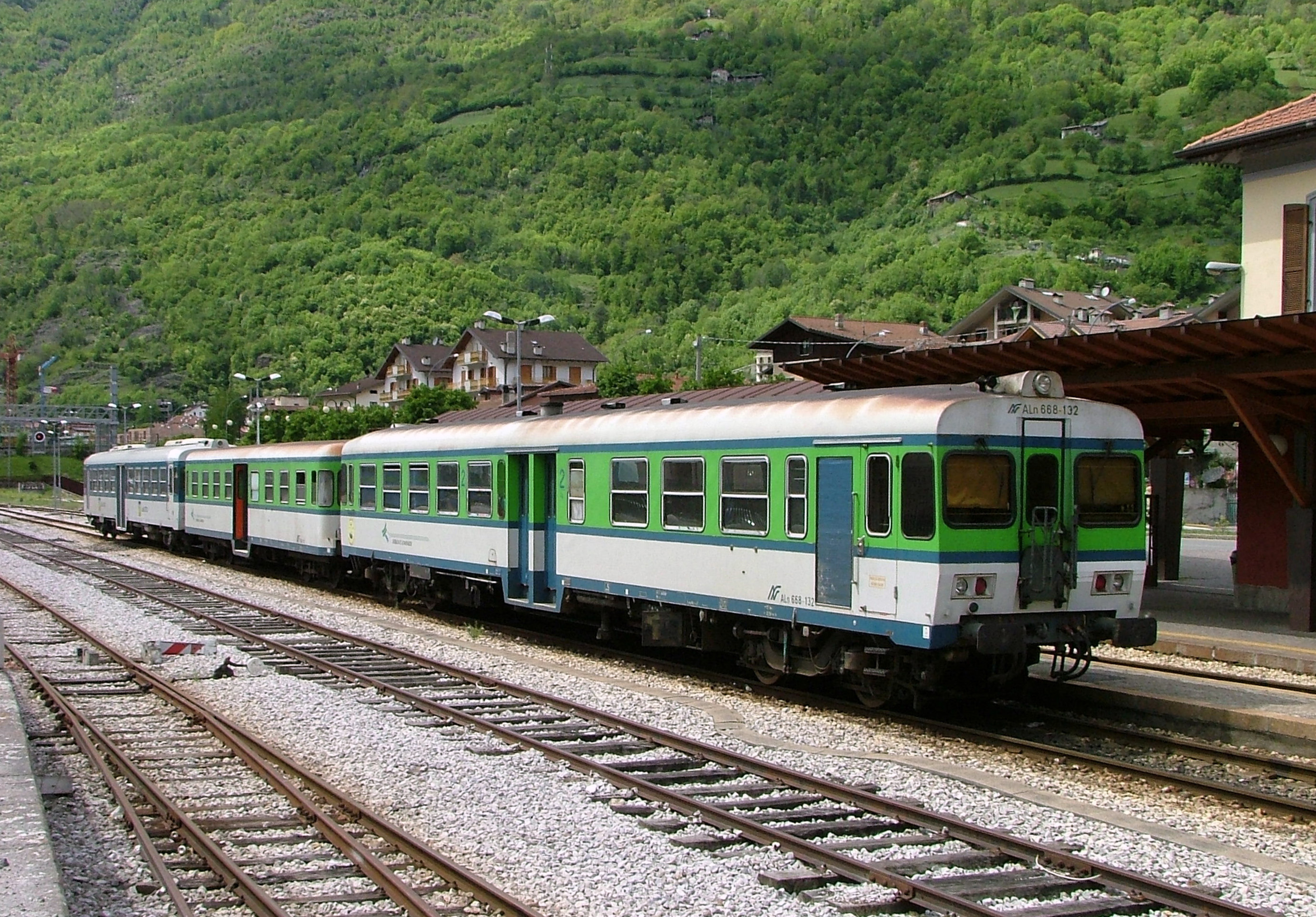
Trains at Edolo

== See also ==
- List of railway lines in Italy
- Rail transport in Italy
- History of rail transport in Italy
