= Brescia railway station =

Station in Lombardy, Italy

Brescia
- The passenger building

General information
- Location: Viale della Stazione 7; 25122 Brescia; Brescia (BS), Lombardy; Italy
- Coordinates: 45°31′57″N 10°12′46″E
- Operator: Rete Ferroviaria Italiana; Centostazioni
- Lines: Milan–Venice; Bergamo–Brescia; Brescia–Cremona; Brescia–Iseo–Edolo; Brescia–Parma
- Distance: 82.842 km (51.476 mi) from Milano Centrale
- Tracks: 18
- Train operators: Trenitalia; Trenord; NTV-Italo
- Connections: Brescia Metro; Urban and suburban buses

Other information
- IATA code: BRZ
- Classification: Gold

History
- Opened: 24 April 1854; 172 years ago
Location
- Location within Lombardy Location within Northern Italy Location within Italy

Brescia railway station (IATA: BRZ) (Italian: Stazione di Brescia) is the main station serving the city and comune of Brescia, in the region of Lombardy, northern Italy. The station is situated in central Brescia, on the south-western edge of the historic town centre. It is used by about 60,000 passengers per day and about 20 million passengers per year.

The station, opened in 1854, is located on the Milan-Venice railway and is a terminus of three branch lines: Valcamonica Railway to Edolo, Bergamo–Brescia railway and Brescia–Piadena/Cremona railway which branches off towards southeast of the station. Connection to the Milan-Venice high-speed railway (Milan-Verona section) entered operation on 11 December 2016. Construction of the section between Brescia and Verona is still underway. Upon completing the entire section, however, some trains might bypass Brescia to run non-stop between Milan and Verona.

The station is currently managed by Rete Ferroviaria Italiana (RFI). The commercial area of the passenger building, however, is managed by Centostazioni. These companies are full subsidiaries of Ferrovie dello Stato (FS), Italy's state-owned rail company. Train services are operated by Trenitalia, Trenord and NTV-Italo.

== Location ==
Brescia railway station is situated at Viale della Stazione in central Brescia, on the south-western edge of the historic city centre. It is integrated with the Stazione FS station of the Brescia Metro, and lies immediately adjacent to Brescia's long distance and local bus stations.

== History ==
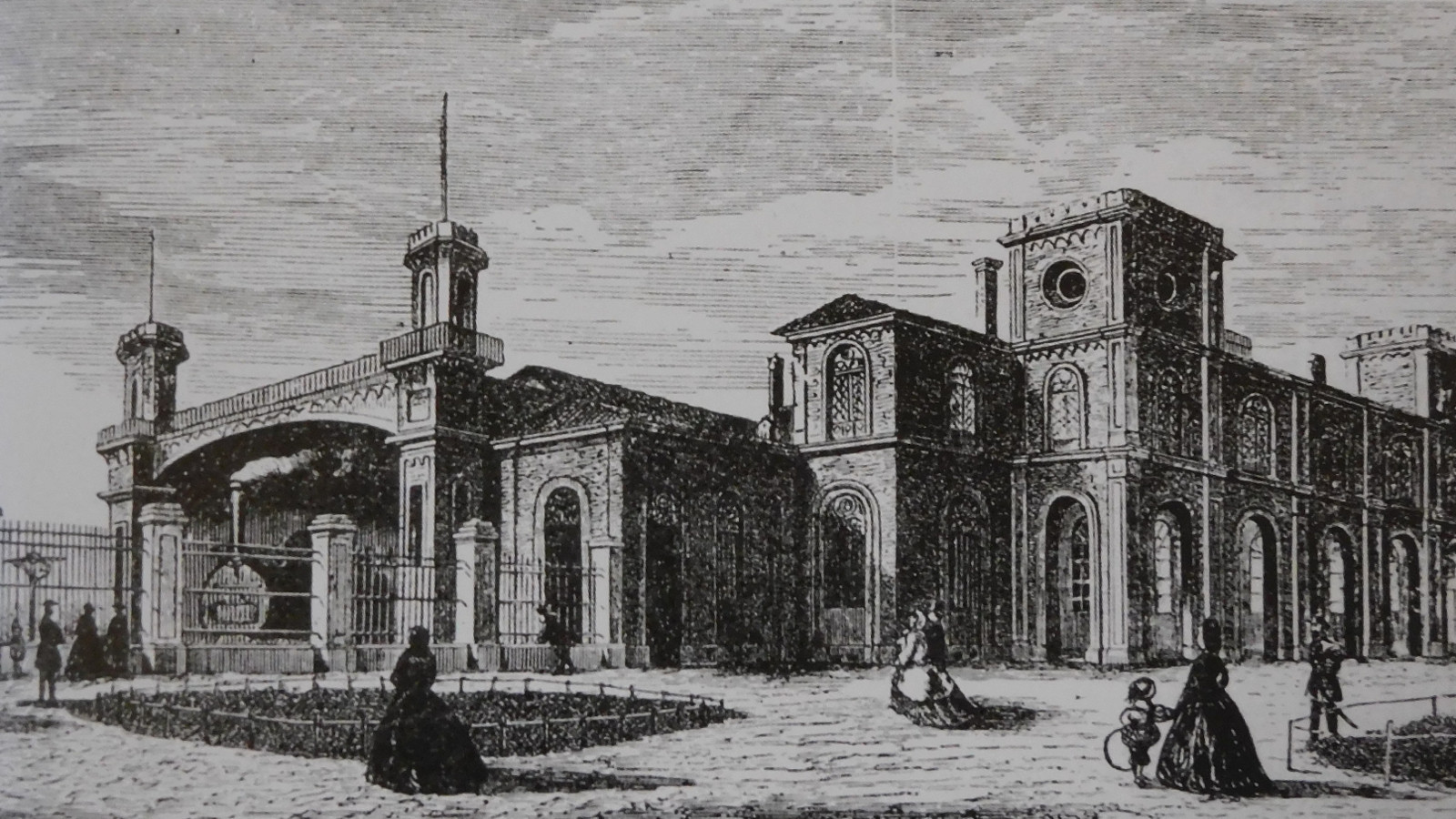
The newly opened station in the 1850s.

Brescia station was opened on 24 April 1854 upon the inauguration of the Verona–Bergamo section of the Milan–Venice railway line which was completed with the opening of the section from Bergamo to Treviglio on 12 October 1857.

On 15 December 1866, the railway line from Brescia to Cremona was opened. With the opening of the direct railway line between Rovato and Treviglio on 5 March 1878, the Milan–Venice railway line took its current form bypassing Bergamo and the original main line section between Bergamo and Brescia was reduced to a branch line. On 22 June 1885 the railway line from Brescia to Iseo was opened for traffic, followed by the railway line from Brescia to Parma on 1 August 1893.

== Architecture ==
Street facade of the passenger building in 2020.

Brescia station's original and still existing passenger building is constructed in a neoclassical style influenced by neo-Roman elements and medieval style fortifications. The building was built to designs by the architect Giovanni Bottura with possible alterations by the engineer Benedetto Foix who also designed the original passenger building of the railway station in Treviso, which bore resemblance to the building in Brescia.

== Layout ==
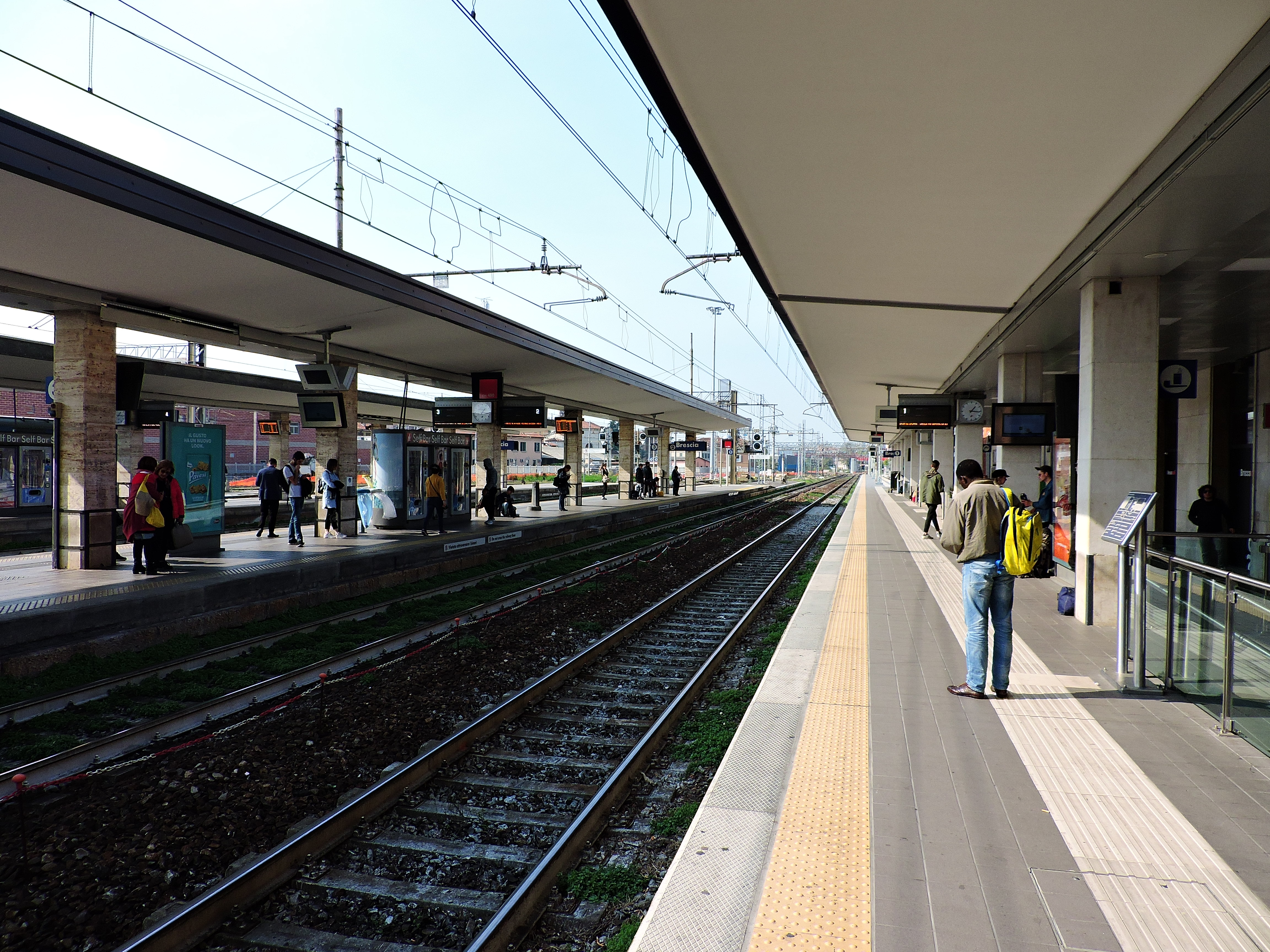
View of the tracks and platforms in 2017.

The station has eleven tracks, three of which are bay platforms located at the western end (Italian: Piazzale Ovest). The bay platforms are exclusively used for trains operating on the Valcamonica Railway (Brescia–Iseo–Edolo railway). Additional tracks are dedicated to goods trains to and from Brescia Scalo or used for storage of rolling stock.

== Train services ==
The following services call at this station:

=== Domestic (High-speed) ===
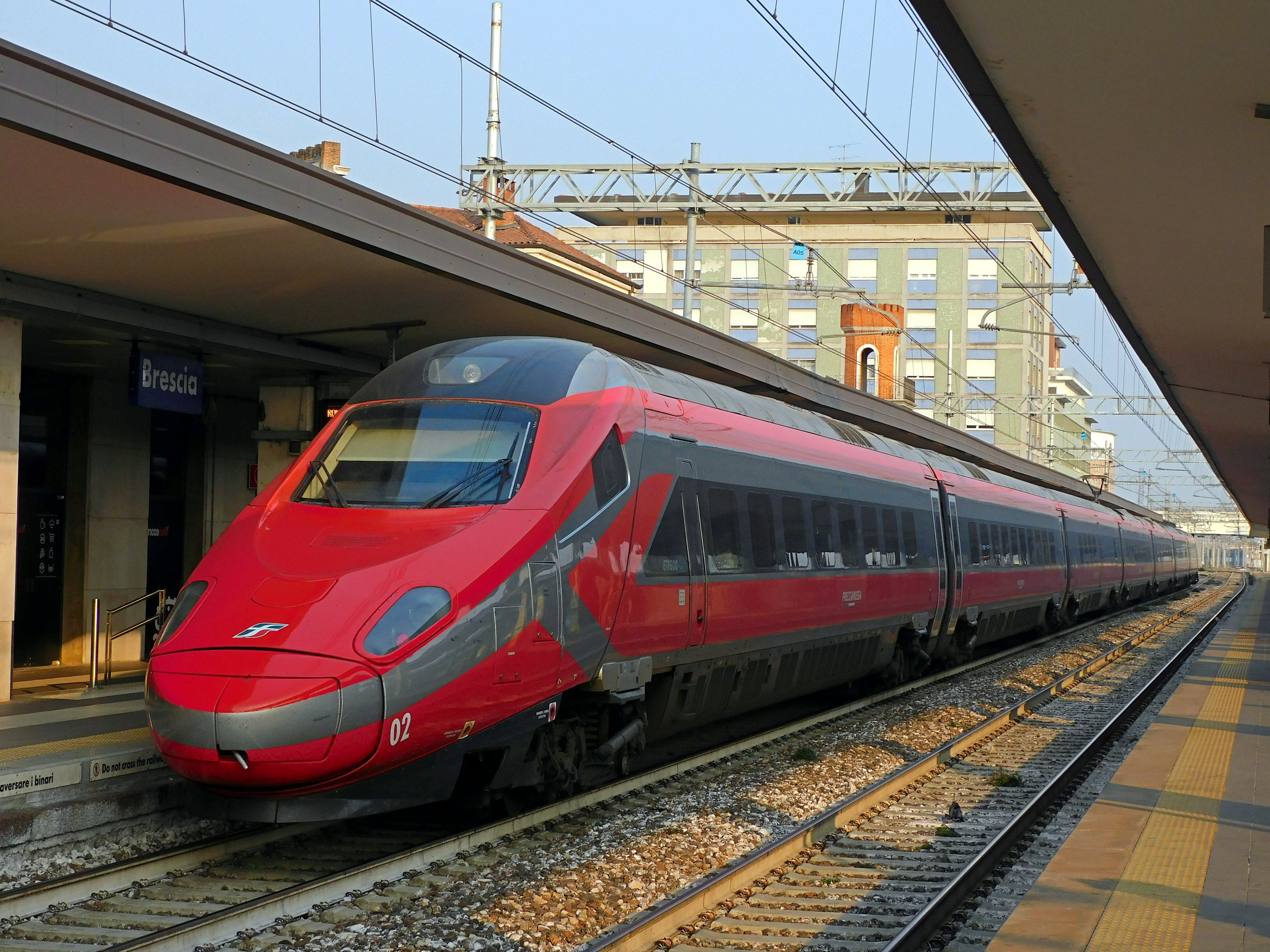
A Frecciarossa high-speed train of Trenitalia calling at Brescia in 2023.

- High-speed train (Trenitalia Frecciarossa) Milan-Venice: Milan - Brescia - Peschiera del Garda - Verona - Vicenza - Padua - Venice
- High-speed train (Trenitalia Frecciarossa) Turin-Venice: Turin - Milan - Brescia - Peschiera del Garda - Verona - Vicenza - Padua - Venice
- High-speed train (Trenitalia Frecciabianca) Turin-Venice: Turin - Milan - Brescia - Peschiera del Garda - Verona - Vicenza - Padua - Venice
- High-speed train (Trenitalia Frecciargento) Brescia-Rome: Brescia - Verona - Bologna - Florence - Rome
- High-speed train (Trenitalia Frecciargento) Bergamo-Rome: Bergamo - Brescia - Verona - Bologna - Florence - Rome
- High-speed train (Italo NTV) Brescia-Naples: Brescia - Verona - Bologna - Florence - Rome - Naples

=== Domestic ===
- Regional train (Trenord Regional Express) Milan-Verona: Milan - Treviglio - Brescia - Desanzano del Garda - Peschiera del Garda - Verona
- Regional train (Trenord Regional) Brescia-Parma: Brescia - Ghedi - Asola - Piadena - Casalmaggiore - Parma
- Regional train (Trenord Regional) Brescia-Bergamo: Brescia - Rovato - Bergamo
- Regional train (Trenord Regional) Brescia-Edolo: Brescia - Iseo - Pisogne - Darfo Corno - Boario Terme - Breno - Capo di Ponte - Edolo
- Regional train (Trenord Regional) Brescia-Iseo: Brescia - Brescia Ospitaletto - Rovato - Iseo
- Regional train (Trenitalia Regional) Brescia-Cremona: Brescia - Manerbio - Verolanuova - Cremona
- Regional train (Trenitalia Regional) Bergamo-Pisa: Bergamo - Rovato - Brescia - Cremona - Fidenza - Pontremoli - Massa Centro - Pisa

=== Cross-border ===
(CH for Switzerland, A for Austria, D for Germany)

- Night train (ÖBB Nightjet) Milan-Munich: Milan - Brescia - Peschiera del Garda - Verona - Vicenza - Padua - Villach (A) - Salzburg (A) - Rosenheim (D) - Munich (D)
- Night train (ÖBB Nightjet) Milan-Vienna: Milan - Brescia - Peschiera del Garda - Verona - Vicenza - Padua - Villach (A) - Klagenfurt (A) - Leoben (A) - Vienna/Wien (A)
- Intercity train (SBB-CFF-FFS EuroCity) Geneva-Milan/Venice: Geneva (CH) - Brig (CH) - Milan (Centrale) - (Brescia) - (Verona) - (Padua) - (Venice)

From June 2017, a new intercity service between Venice and Zürich (CH) will be launched by Trenitalia and SBB-CFF-FFS.

== Interchange ==
Brescia railway station is connected to Stazione FS of the Brescia Metro.

Two bus stations are located outside the station's passenger building. The main bus terminal, directly linked by a short walkway, has interurban services to Mantova, Verona and airport shuttles to Milan-Bergamo (Orio al Serio) Airport. The smaller, road-side SIA bus station has interurban bus services to Bergamo and various towns and villages of Valcamonica.

== See also ==
- History of rail transport in Italy
- List of railway stations in Lombardy
- Rail transport in Italy
- Railway stations in Italy
