= Marigliani =

Marigliani is a surname. Notable people with the surname include:

- Marcus Marigliani (born 1985), Australian rules footballer
- Umberto Marigliani (1885–1960), Italian painter
