= Rovato railway station =

Railway station in Italy

Rovato
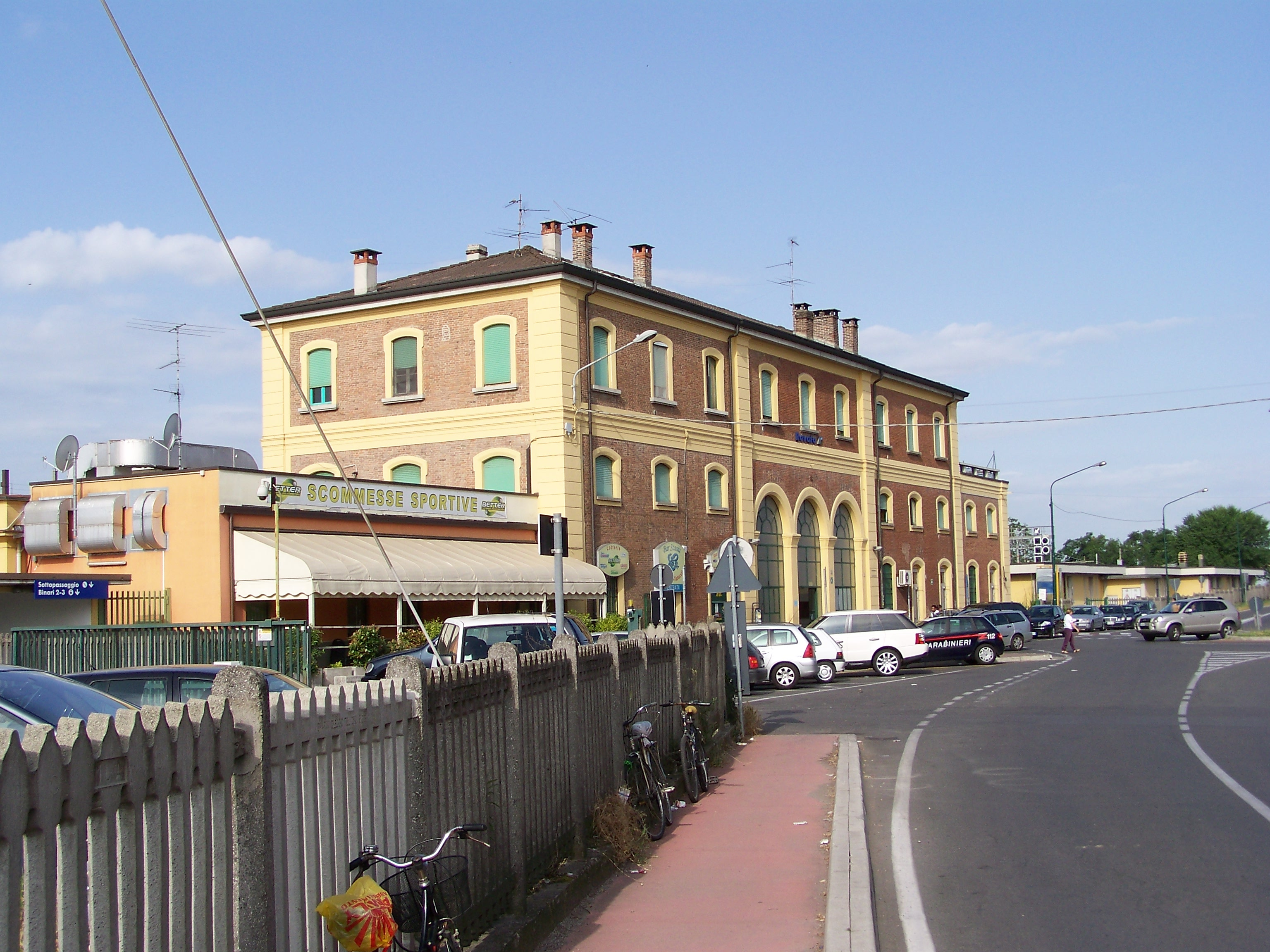
- Rovato railway station

General information
- Location: Viale Lombardia, Rovato, Lombardy; Italy
- Coordinates: 45°33′08″N 10°00′04″E
- Owner: Rete Ferroviaria Italiana
- Operator: Trenord
- Lines: Milan–Venice railway Bergamo–Brescia railway
- Distance: 65.827 km (40.903 mi) from Milano Centrale
- Platforms: 5
- Tracks: 11

Other information
- Classification: Silver

History
- Opened: 5 March 1878; 148 years ago
Location
- Location within Lombardy Location within Northern Italy Location within Italy

Rovato (Italian: Stazione di Rovato) is a railway station serving the town of Rovato, in the region of Lombardy, northern Italy. The station opened on 5 March 1878 and is located on the Milan–Venice railway and Bergamo–Brescia railway. The train services are operated by Trenord.

The Cremona–Iseo railway passes just north of the station, calling at a separate station Rovato Borgo railway station, before joining the main Milan–Venice railway east of the station. It is on this railway that there is a station close to the centre of Rovato, Rovato Citta railway station.

== History ==
Between 1897 and 1915 the station was served by horse-drawn tram services on the Iseo-Rovato-Chiari tramway.

== Train services ==
The station is served by the following service(s):

- Express services (Treno regionale) Milan - Treviglio - Brescia - Verona
- Regional services (Treno regionale) Sesto San Giovanni - Milan - Treviglio - Brescia
- Regional services (Treno regionale) Bergamo - Rovato - Brescia

== See also ==
- History of rail transport in Italy
- List of railway stations in Lombardy
- Rail transport in Italy
- Railway stations in Italy
