= Caravaggio (train) =

Italian regional electric trains

Hitachi Caravaggio
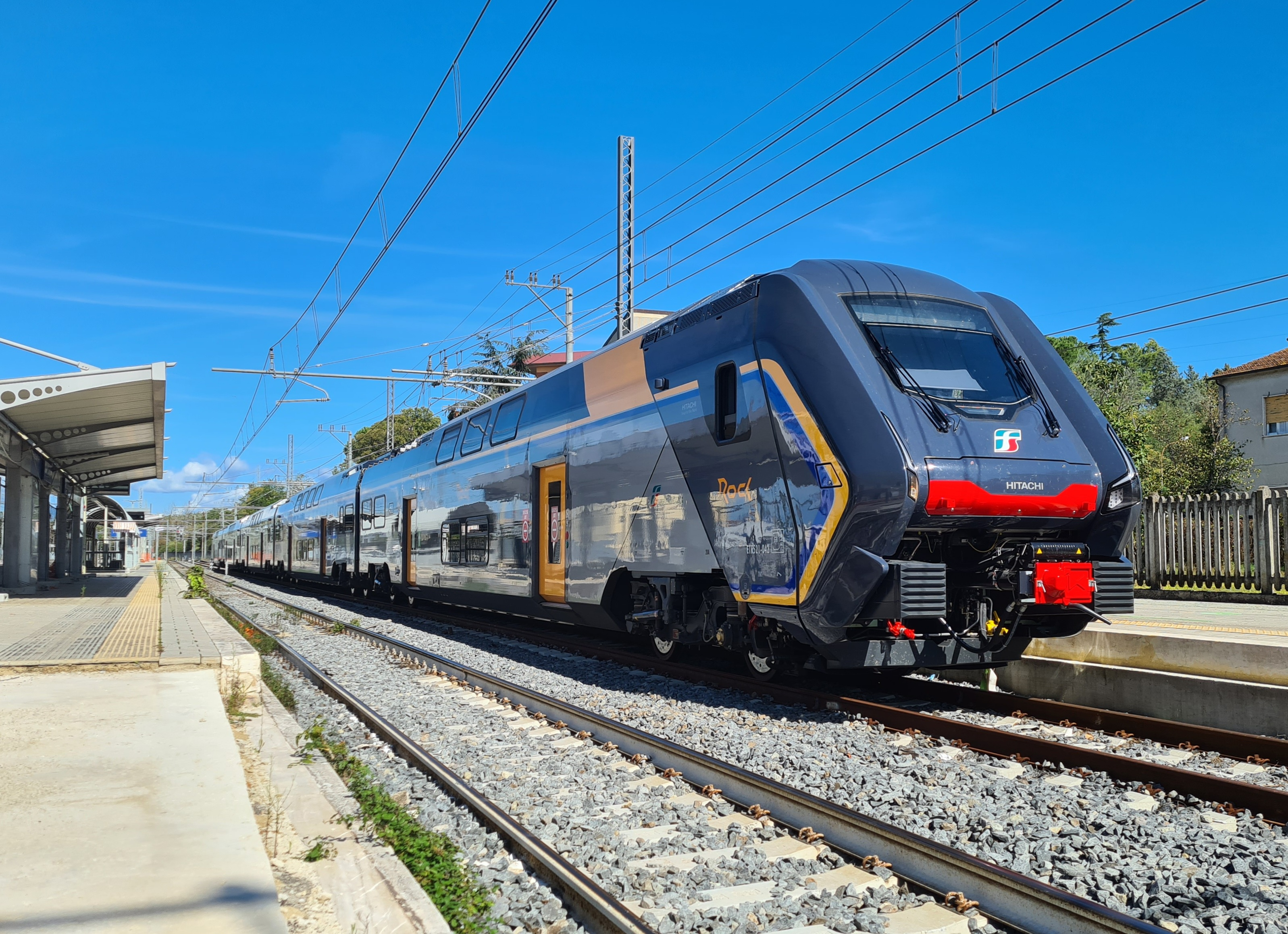
- A Trenitalia ETR 521 "Rock" train at Fara Sabina-Montelibretti railway station
- Stock type: Electric multiple unit
- Manufacturer: Hitachi Rail Italy
- Constructed: 2017–
- Entered service: 14 June 2019
- Formation: ETR 421 - 4 cars ETR 521 - 5 cars ETR 621 - 6 cars
- Capacity: ETR 421 - 479; ETR 521 - 629; ETR 621 - 729
- Operators: DB Regio; Trenitalia; Trenord

Specifications
- Train length: ETR 421 - 109.6 m (359 ft 7 in); ETR 521 - 136.8 m (448 ft 10 in); ETR 621 - 163.4 m (536 ft 1 in)
- Width: 2.8 metres (9 ft 2 in)
- Height: 4.3 metres (14 ft 1 in)
- Maximum speed: 160 km/h (99 mph)
- Electric system: 15kV 16.7Hz~ 3kV=
- Track gauge: 1,435 mm (4 ft 8 1/2 in)

The Hitachi Caravaggio is an electric multiple unit (EMU) developed and built by Hitachi Rail Italy. It is named after the Italian Baroque painter Michelangelo Merisi da Caravaggio.

The Caravaggio was ordered by Italian operator Trenitalia in June 2016; follow-on orders were placed by Trenitalia and Ferrovie Nord Milano. The first trainset rolled-out in April 2018. The Caravaggio entered revenue service with Trenitalia on 14 June 2019; it has been branded as "Rock".

== History ==
In June 2016, Trenitalia ordered the Caravaggio, awarding Hitachi Rail Italy a €333 million contract to supply 39 five-car multiple units. The order had options for up to 300 trainsets at a cost of €2.6 billion; Trenitalia claimed the potential value was unprecedented in Italy. By the time the first trainset was completed at Hitachi's factory in Pistoia in April 2018, Trenitalia had increased its order to 118 trainsets, including four-, five-, and six-car versions. The Caravaggio was assigned class designations ETR 421 and ETR 521 dependent on its configuration; Trenitalia had branded the train as "Rock."

In 2018, the first trainset was tested at the Velim railway test circuit in the Czech Republic ahead of its entry into service the following year. On 14 June 2019, the Caravaggio's inaugural run took place between Piacenza and Bologna, marking its entry into revenue service.

In September 2018, Ferrovie Nord Milano (FNM) announced it planned to purchase up to 120 Caravaggio EMUs over an eight year period, beginning with a €238 million order for 30 four-car trainsets. The eight-year framework included an option for three years of maintenance support for the fleet. FNM deliveries are scheduled to begin by May 2020.

From 5 September 2022 the ETR 522s entered service on the Ferrovienord Saronno–Laveno railway line

== Design ==
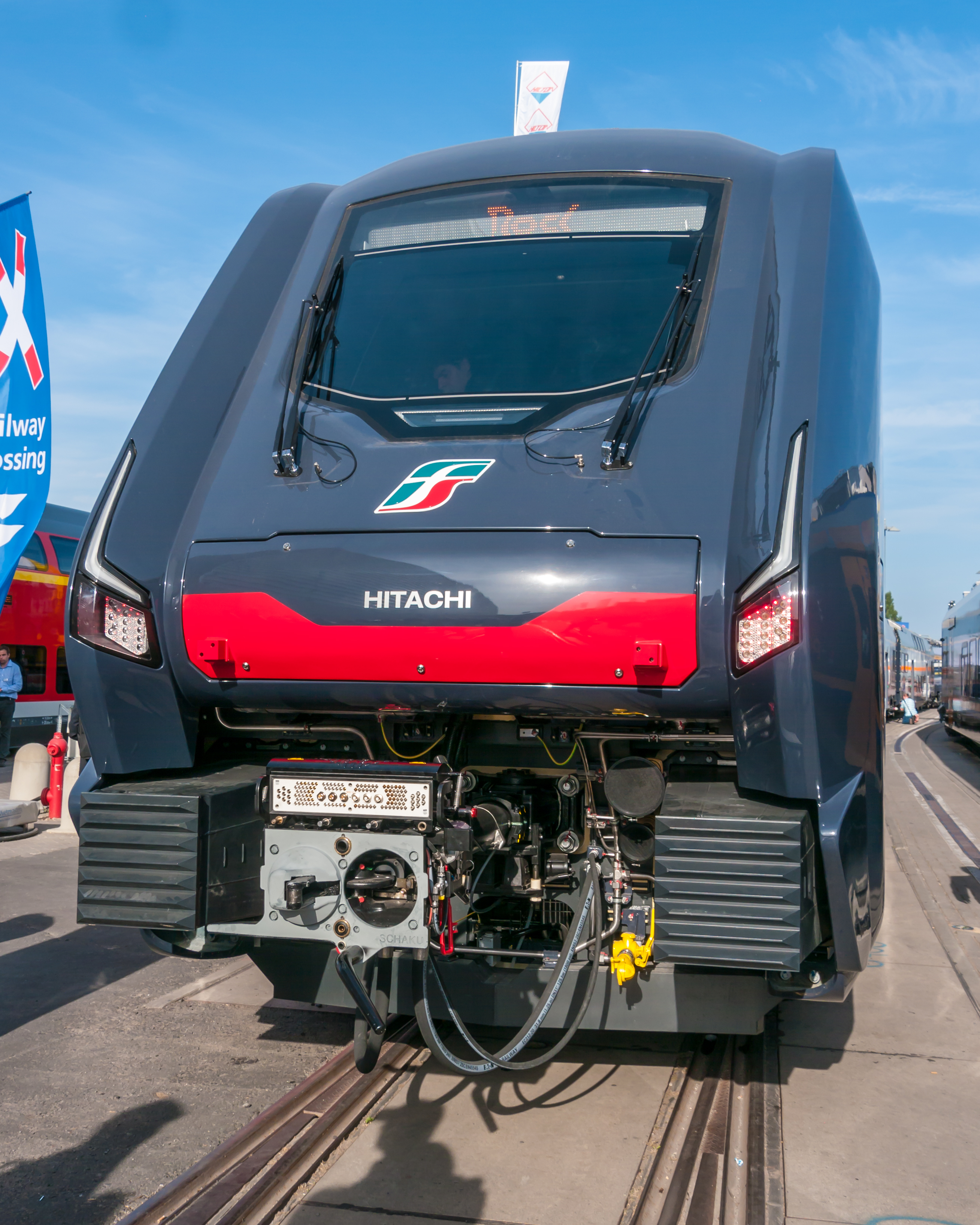
Front view of the Hitachi Caravaggio

The Caravaggio is a high-capacity double-deck EMU for regional traffic, each car is about 27 metres (88 ft 7 in) long. The Caravaggio is of equivalent quality to contemporary high speed trains for passengers and crews. Compared to the trains it is replacing, it provides greater comfort and sustainability and is more accessible for people with reduced mobility. It consumes 30% less energy than the historic fleet, and is more than 95% recyclable. Additional environmentally-friendly measures include regenerative braking and lower noise emissions. In 2018, Maurizio Manfellotto, CEO of Hitachi Rail Italy, claimed the Caravaggio's carbon emissions of 5 grams CO2eq were the lowest for any mass transport mode in Italy.

Each train is powered by a 3 kV DC electric system producing 3,400 kilowatts (4,600 hp) and a maximum speed of 160 kilometres per hour (99 mph). The traction equipment is mostly roof-mounted, optimising the interior space for passenger accommodation. The train's acceleration is greater than 1m/sec², which has been credited with improving punctuality. The train is equipped with side- and front-facing cameras with anomalous behaviour detection. The body is primarily made of lightweight alloys, giving a low weight per passenger and a high passenger capacity per unit length. Passenger capacity varies by operator; in Trentialia's configuration, a five-car set can carry up to 656 people, while an equivalent FNM set can carry 598 seated passengers and 575 standing.

The trainset's ergonomic eco-friendly leather seats are designed for comfort. The cabin has air conditioning which is adjusted according to the number of passengers on board, to lower energy consumption. Each 5-car train has ten doors per side and two toilets (one standard and one for people with reduced mobility). The Caravaggio has luggage storage areas and dedicated spaces for bicycles, sockets to charge electric bicycles. The trains have LED lighting, Wi-Fi, USB sockets, a passenger information system, energy meters, and a passenger counter. Staircases above the bogies give access to the upper deck. The doors are fitted with movable steps to cover the gap between the platform and vehicle when the train is stopped; a manually operated ramp is available for passengers with reduced mobility.

== Variants ==
ETR 421/521/621 Rock
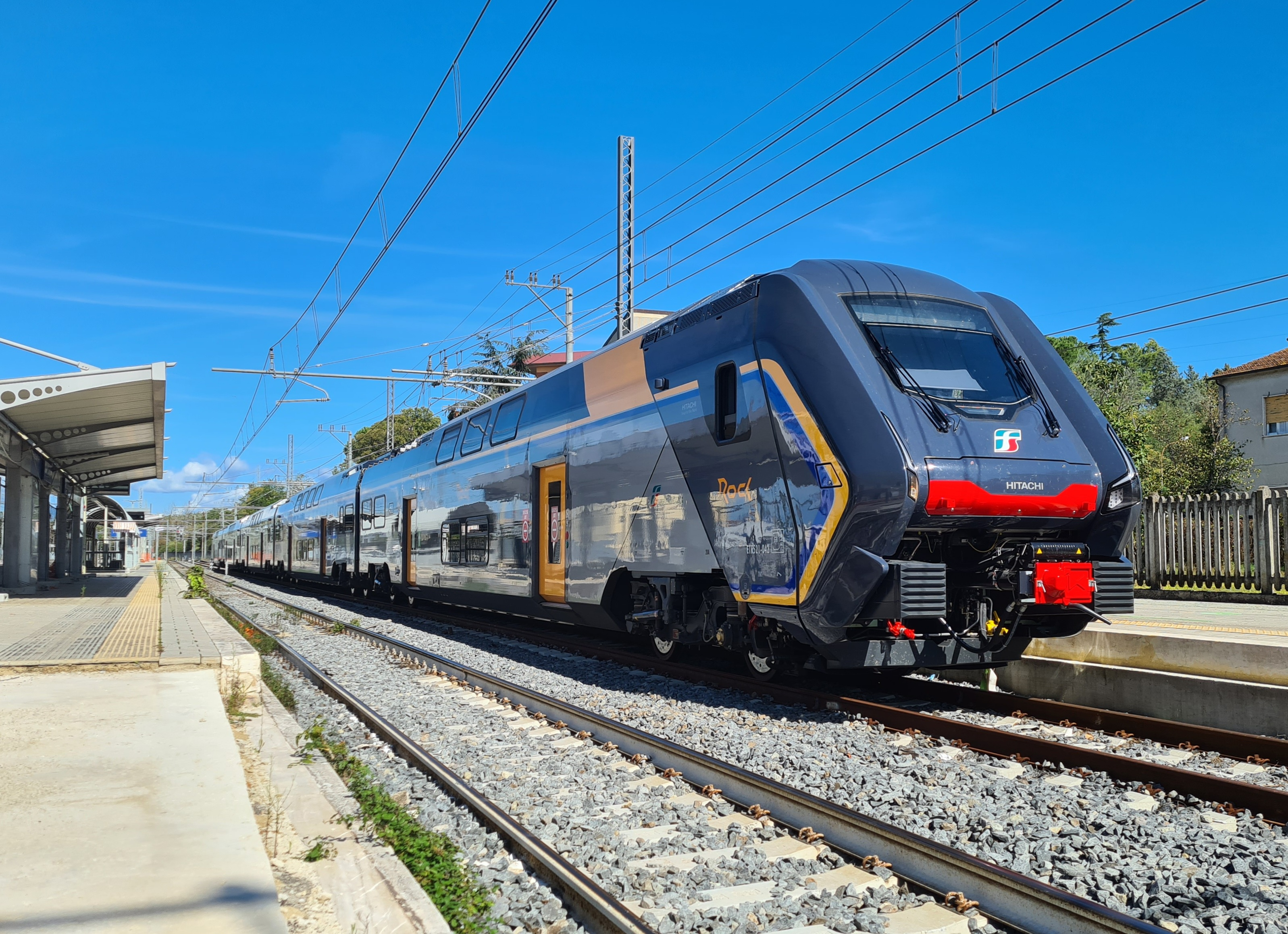
- A Trenitalia ETR 521 "Rock" train at Fara Sabina-Montelibretti railway station
- Manufacturer: Hitachi Rail Italy
- Constructed: 2017–
- Entered service: 14 June 2019
- Formation: ETR 421 - 4 cars ETR 521 - 5 cars ETR 621 - 6 cars
- Capacity: ETR 421 - 479; ETR 521 - 629; ETR 621 - 729
- Operators: Trenitalia; Trenord

Specifications
- Train length: ETR 421 - 109.6 m (359 ft 7 in); ETR 521 -136.8 m (448 ft 10 in); ETR 621 - 163.4 m (536 ft 1 in)
- Width: 2.8 metres (9 ft 2 in)
- Height: 4.3 metres (14 ft 1 in)
- Maximum speed: 160 km/h (99 mph)
- Acceleration: 1.1 m/s^{2} (2.5 mph/s)

Notes/references
- "Scheda treno Rock Trenitalia" (PDF). Train data sheet. Trenitalia.

=== Caravaggio (ROCK) ===
June 2016, Trenitalia ordered the Caravaggio, awarding Hitachi Rail Italy a €333 million contract to supply 39 five-car multiple units. The order had options for up to 300 trainsets at a cost of €2.6 billion; Trenitalia claimed the potential value was unprecedented in Italy. By the time the first trainset was completed at Hitachi's factory in Pistoia in April 2018, Trenitalia had increased its order to 118 trainsets, including four-, five-, and six-car versions. The Caravaggio was assigned class designations ETR 421 and ETR 521 dependent on its configuration; Trenitalia had branded the train as "Rock."

=== Eurocaravaggio ===
In October 2026, the second part of the Rhein-Ruhr-Express (RRX) was awarded to DB Regio and Westfalenbahn, an order of 34 sets of 4-car variant of the Eurocaravaggio was placed.

== Gallery ==
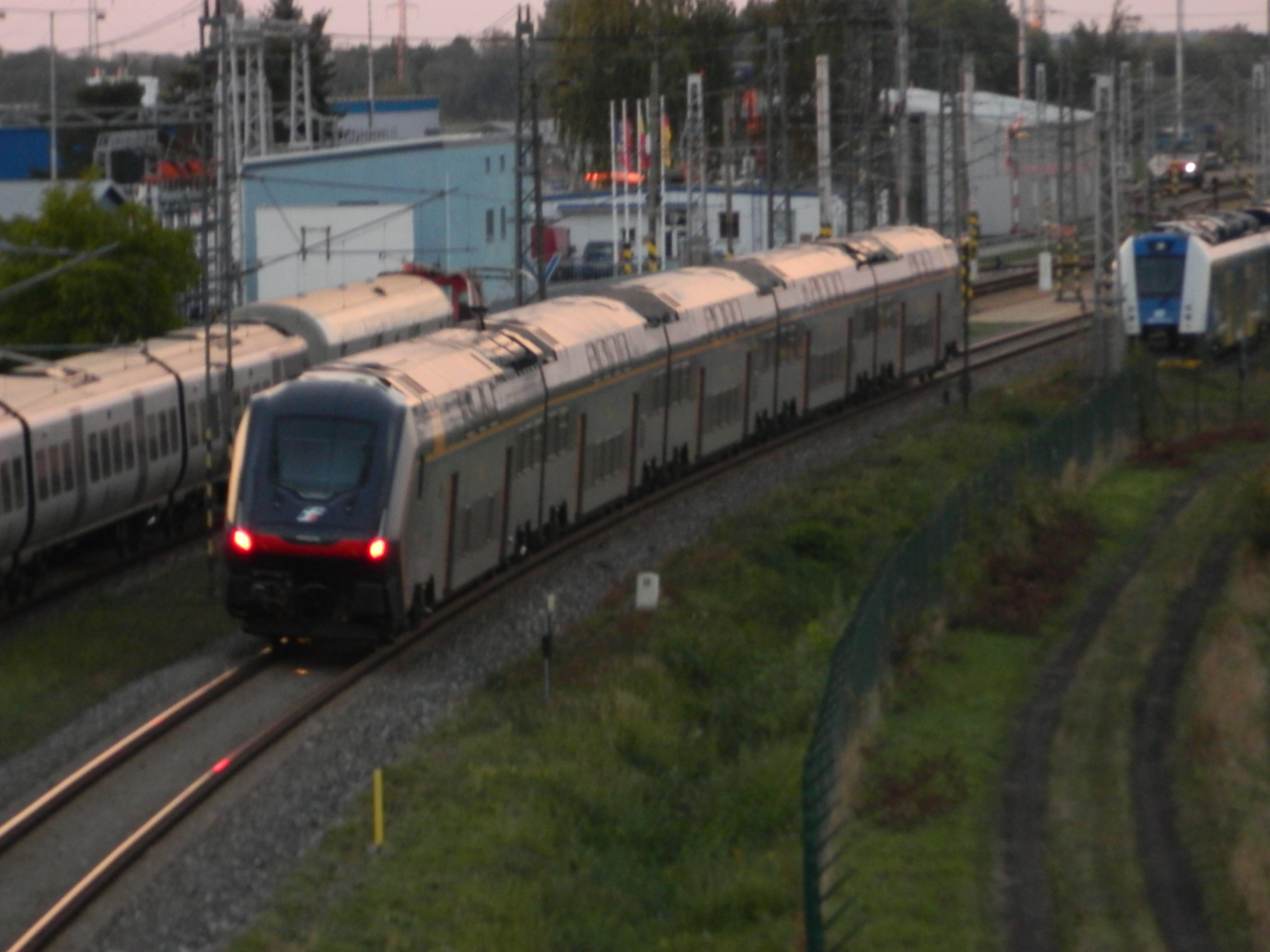
A five car trainset on test at Velim Test Track, Cerhenice, Czech Republic

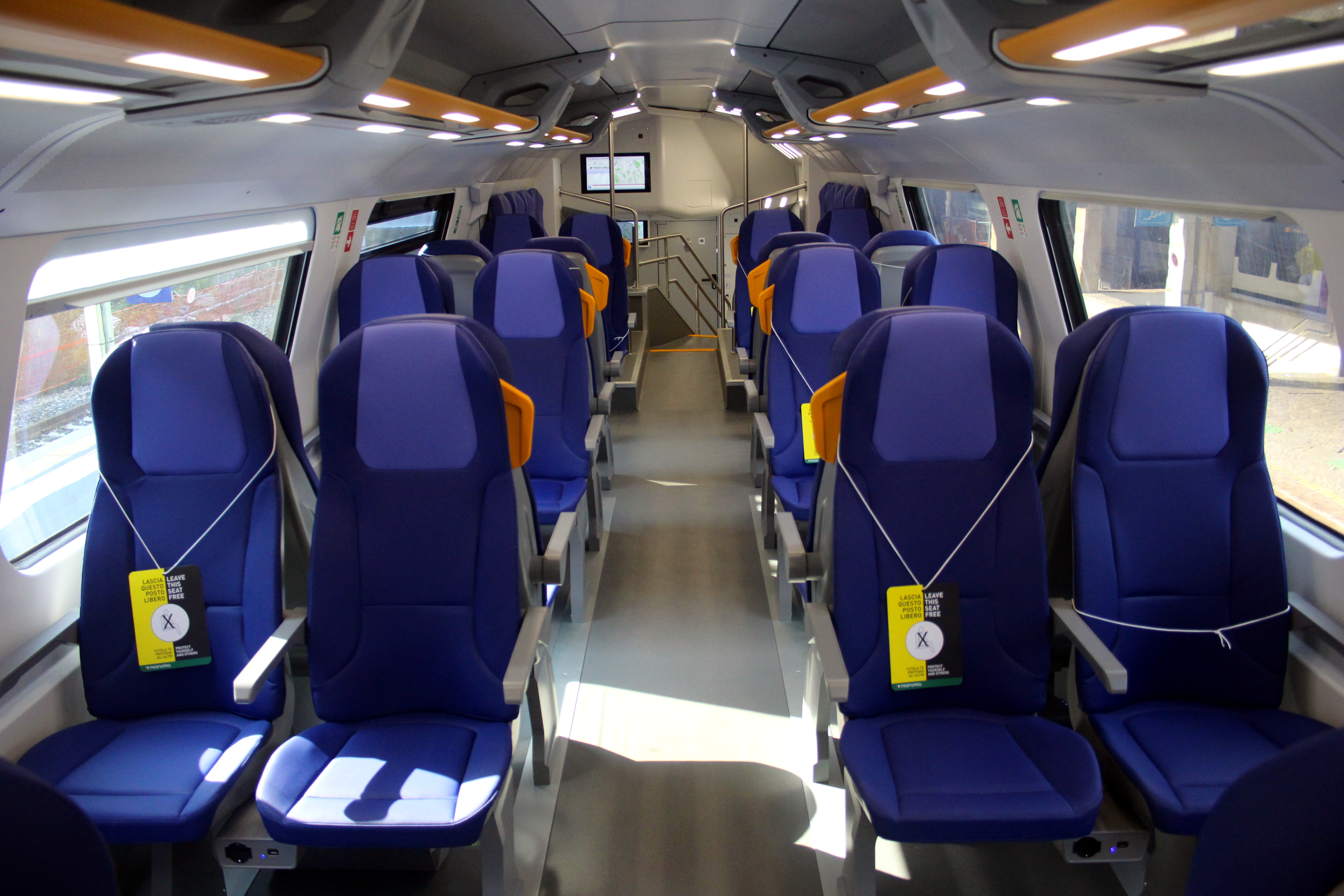
Interior of a Trenord ETR.521

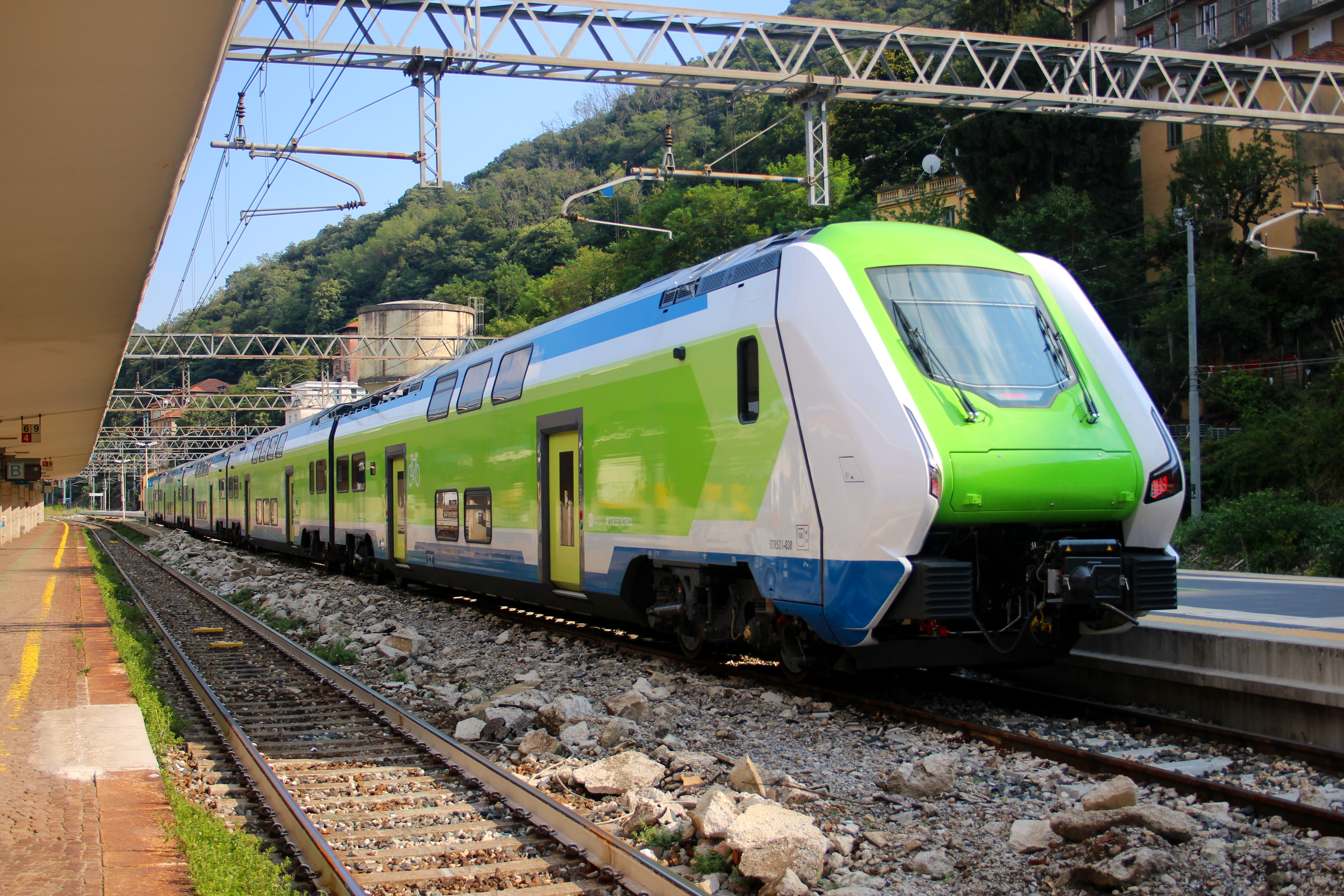
An ETR 521 Caravaggio of Trenord's S11 Line, at the Como San Giovanni railway station
