= LeNORD =

LeNORD S.r.l.
- Company type: Limited company
- Industry: Rail transport
- Founded: Milan, Italy (1 January 2004)
- Defunct: 2011/05/03
- Successor: Trenord
- Headquarters: Milan, Italy
- Key people: Antonio Colombo, President; Marco Piuri, CEO
- Products: Passenger services
- Revenue: € 149,551,557 (2008)
- Net income: € 1,189,603 (2008)
- Number of employees: 1,201 (2008)
- Parent: FNM S.p.A.
- Website: www.lenord.it (in English)

LeNORD S.r.l. (prior to 15 May 2006, Ferrovie Nord Milano Trasporti S.r.l.) was a subsidiary of the FNM Group responsible for operating passenger train services in northern Italy.

The company was wound down upon its merger with the Lombardy Regional Division of Trenitalia on May 3, 2011. The merged entity became Trenord.

The company moved approximately 50 million passengers per year, carried on 500 trains per day on 400 km (250 mi) of rail network, including both the network granted to the FNM Group, managed by FERROVIENORD, and the Milan Passerby Railway, managed by Rete Ferroviaria Italiana (RFI).

Together with Trenitalia and ATM Milano, LeNORD was a member of the temporary undertaking that took over the train service of the Milan suburban line S5 from 1 July 2008. On behalf of Trenitalia LeNORD, the company also managed the only rail link between the city of Milan and Malpensa Aeroporto railway station, the Malpensa Express. This service was previously operated by a company of the same name, which has remained in place as a subsidiary of LeNORD, under the new name VieNORD.

== History ==
The company was founded as Ferrovie Nord Milano Trasporti S.r.l. on 1 January 2004, to take over the business on the passenger division of the company Ferrovie Nord Milano Esercizio SpA (now known as FERROVIENORD). On 12 December 2004, it started operating part of the servizio ferroviario suburbano di Milano. Specifically, it took over operation of the suburban lines S1, S2, S3, S4 and S10.

On 15 May 2006, following the redefinition of the corporate identity of the FNM Group, the company changed its name to LeNORD.

On 18 September 2009, under new agreements with Trenitalia and the Region of Lombardy, the company started the procedure to lease out its line of business to the railway company Trenitalia LeNORD (TLN), established in August 2008. For six years, the new company will be tasked to provide regional services on all lines in Lombardy, at both state and regional level. From 15 November 2009, regional passenger services operated by LeNORD were run on behalf of TLN.

Since 13 December 2009, LeNORD has been operating direct long-distance day EuroCity services between Germany, Austria and Italy, in association with the Österreichische Bundesbahnen (ÖBB) and Deutsche Bahn (DB). The night service long distance EuroNight remains the responsibility of the Ferrovie dello Stato (FS).

On 3 May 2011 LeNord stopped its activity and its operations was moved to Trenord.

== Rail services ==
=== Regional lines ===
Milan branch

Line	Route
Milano–Malpensa	Milano Cadorna – Saronno – Malpensa Aeroporto T1 (Malpensa Express)
Milano–Saronno–Como	Milano Cadorna – Saronno – Como
Milano–Saronno–Varese–Laveno	Milano Cadorna – Saronno – Varese – Laveno
Milano–Saronno–Novara	Milano Cadorna – Saronno – Novara Nord
Milano–Seveso–Canzo-Asso	Milano Cadorna – Seveso – Canzo-Asso

Iseo branch

Line	Route
Brescia–Edolo	Brescia – Iseo – Edolo
Brescia–Iseo	Brescia – Iseo
Brescia–Breno	Brescia – Iseo – Breno
Bornato–Rovato	Bornato – Rovato

=== Diagram of the network served by LeNORD (Milan branch) ===
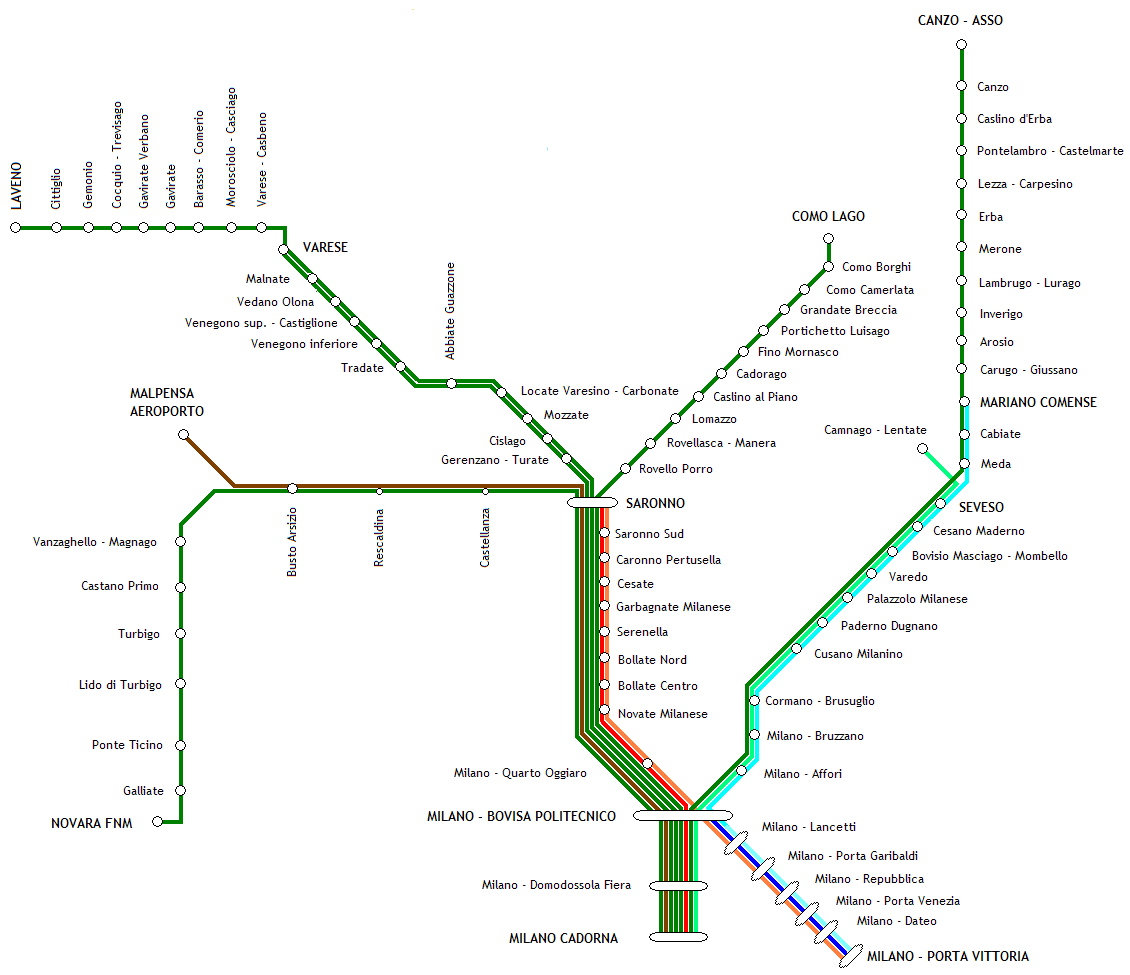
Arrangement of passenger lines of the network LeNord FERROVIENORD (Milan branch) and the Milan Passante Railway.

== Operations ==
The depot and social workshops for running and corrective maintenance for the Milan branch of the company are located in Novate Milanese, 8 km (5.0 mi) from Milan on the Milan–Saronno railway. For the Brescia branch, they are in Iseo. A further storage/workshop area is currently being developed at a former military installation, in the locality of Camnago in Lentate sul Seveso.

== See also ==
- FERROVIENORD
- Milan suburban railway network
