= Brescia–Parma railway =

Railway line in Italy

Overview
- Native name: Ferrovia Brescia-Parma
- Status: in use
- Owner: RFI
- Locale: Italy
- Termini: Brescia railway station; Parma railway station
- Stations: 18

Service
- Type: heavy rail
- Services: R8
- Operator(s): Trenord

History
- Opened: 1 August 1893

Technical
- Number of tracks: 1
- Track gauge: 1,435 mm (4 ft 8 1/2 in) standard gauge
- Electrification: no

The Brescia–Parma railway is a railway line between Lombardy and Emilia-Romagna, Italy. It was opened from 1884 to 1893.

Services are operated by Trenord. For most of the day there is an hourly service in each direction. Journey time is approximately 2 hours.

== See also ==
- List of railway lines in Italy
