= Treno Servizio Regionale =

Series of Italian electrical multiple unit trains

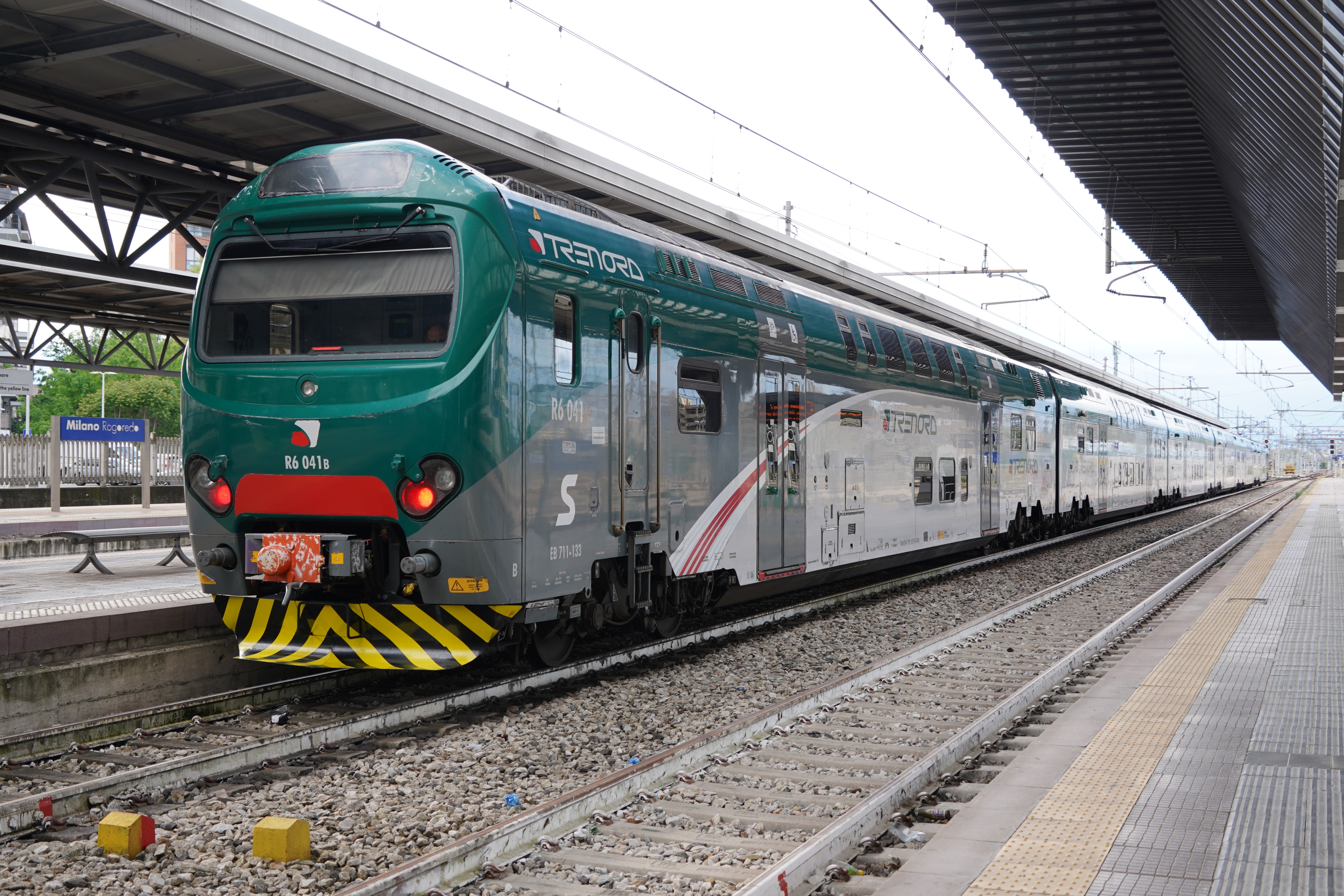
- A TSR in Trenord livery
- In service: 2007–present
- Manufacturers: AnsaldoBreda, Firema, Keller
- Constructed: 2006–2018
- Number built: 252 (EB.710); 208 (EB.711)
- Formation: 3, 4, 5 or 6 cars for trainset
- Fleet numbers: EB.710-001–252; EB.711-001–208
- Capacity: 122 seats (EB.710); 96 seats (EB.711)
- Operators: LeNord; Trenord

Specifications
- Car length: 26,025 mm (85 ft 4.6 in) (EB.710); 26.46 m (86 ft 10 in) (EB.711)
- Wheel diameter: 920 mm (36.2 in)
- Maximum speed: 140 km/h (87 mph)
- Weight: 53 t (52 long tons; 58 short tons) (EB.710); 58 t (57 long tons; 64 short tons) (EB.711)
- Electric system: 3 kV DC (nominal) from overhead catenary
- Current collection: Pantograph
- UIC classification: 2′Bo′
- Track gauge: 1,435 mm (4 ft 8 1/2 in) standard gauge

The Treno Servizio Regionale (TSR) are a series of double-decker EMUs used by the Lombard railway company Trenord for the commuter services around Milan, and particularly for the suburban lines.

== Description ==
Each train is composed by several railcars; some of them have a cab and a wheelchair bay for disabled people (MCH), and some of them have neither (M).

″MCH″-railcars were numbered by LeNord as E.711, ″M″-ones as E.710. In total, 208 MCH and 252 M railcars were built. The traincars can be formed into trains consisting of 3 (MCH + M + MCH) to 6 cars (MCH + M + M + M + M + MCH).

== History ==
The TSR were conceived by AnsaldoBreda and Firema as an evolution of the TAF-EMUs built in the 1990s. The first unit was delivered to the railway company LeNord (later merged into Trenord) on 1 August 2006.

The last train was delivered on 31 March 2012.

== Bibliography ==
- Vittorio Mario Cortese, Potenza dei TSR! In: ″I Treni″ Nr. 300 & 301 (January & February 2008), pp. 16–21 & 12–17.
