= Cividate al Piano–Calcio railway station =

Railway station in Lombardy, Italy

Cividate al Piano–Calcio
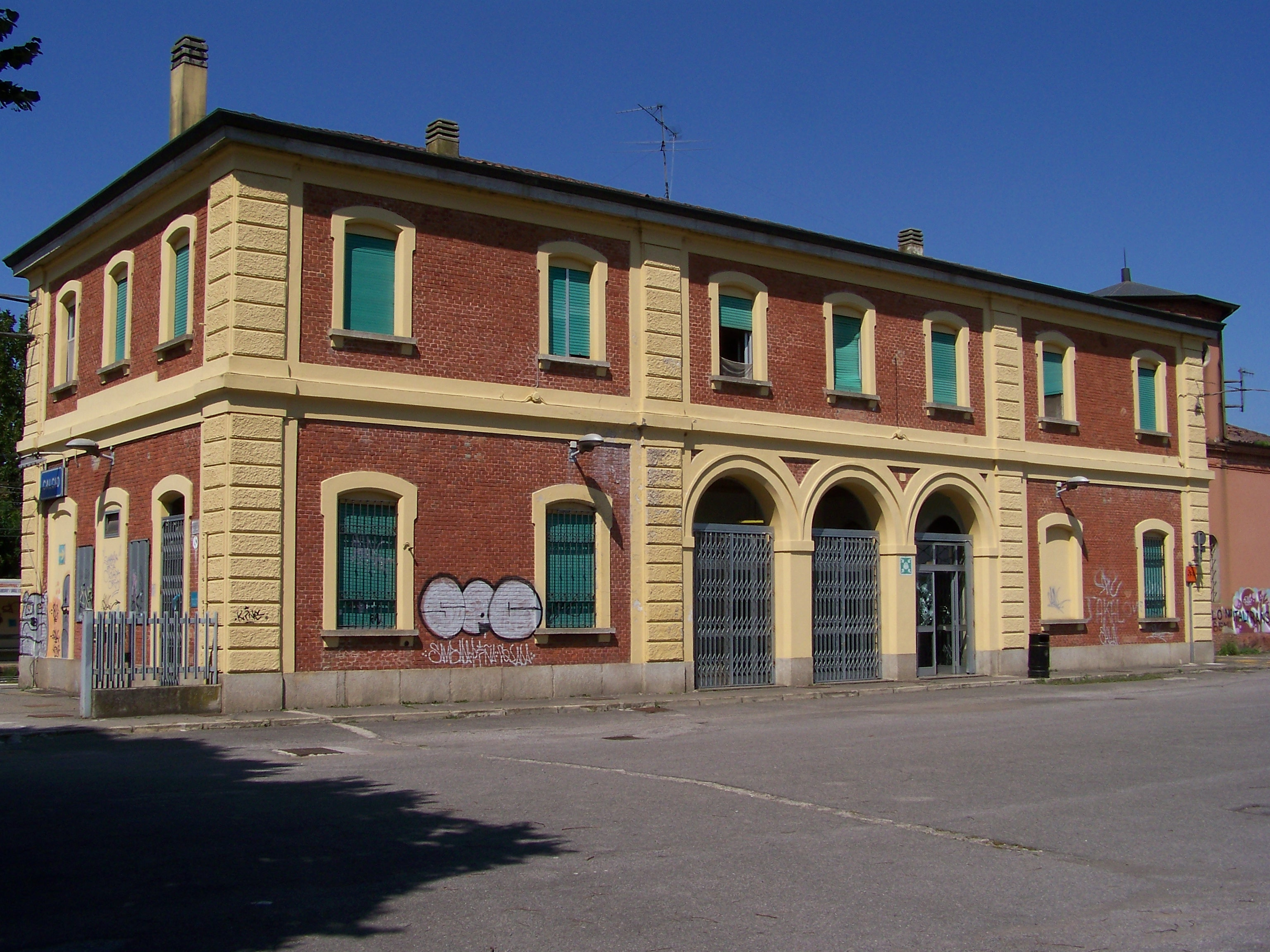
- Calcio railway station

General information
- Location: Via Stazione, Calcio, Lombardy; Italy
- Coordinates: 45°31′58″N 09°50′30″E
- Owner: Rete Ferroviaria Italiana
- Operator: Trenord
- Line: Milan–Venice railway
- Distance: 53.018 km (32.944 mi) from Milano Centrale
- Platforms: 2
- Tracks: 2

Other information
- Classification: Bronze
Location
- Location within Lombardy Location within Northern Italy Location within Italy

Cividate al Piano–Calcio (Italian: Stazione di Cividate al Piano-Calcio) is a railway station serving the towns of Cividate al Piano and Calcio, in the region of Lombardy, northern Italy. The station is located on the Milan–Venice railway. The train services are operated by Trenord.

== Train services ==
The station is served by the following service(s):

- Regional services (Treno regionale) Sesto San Giovanni – Milan – Treviglio – Brescia

== See also ==
- History of rail transport in Italy
- List of railway stations in Lombardy
- Rail transport in Italy
- Railway stations in Italy
