= Rovato Borgo railway station =

Railway station in Italy

Rovato Borgo
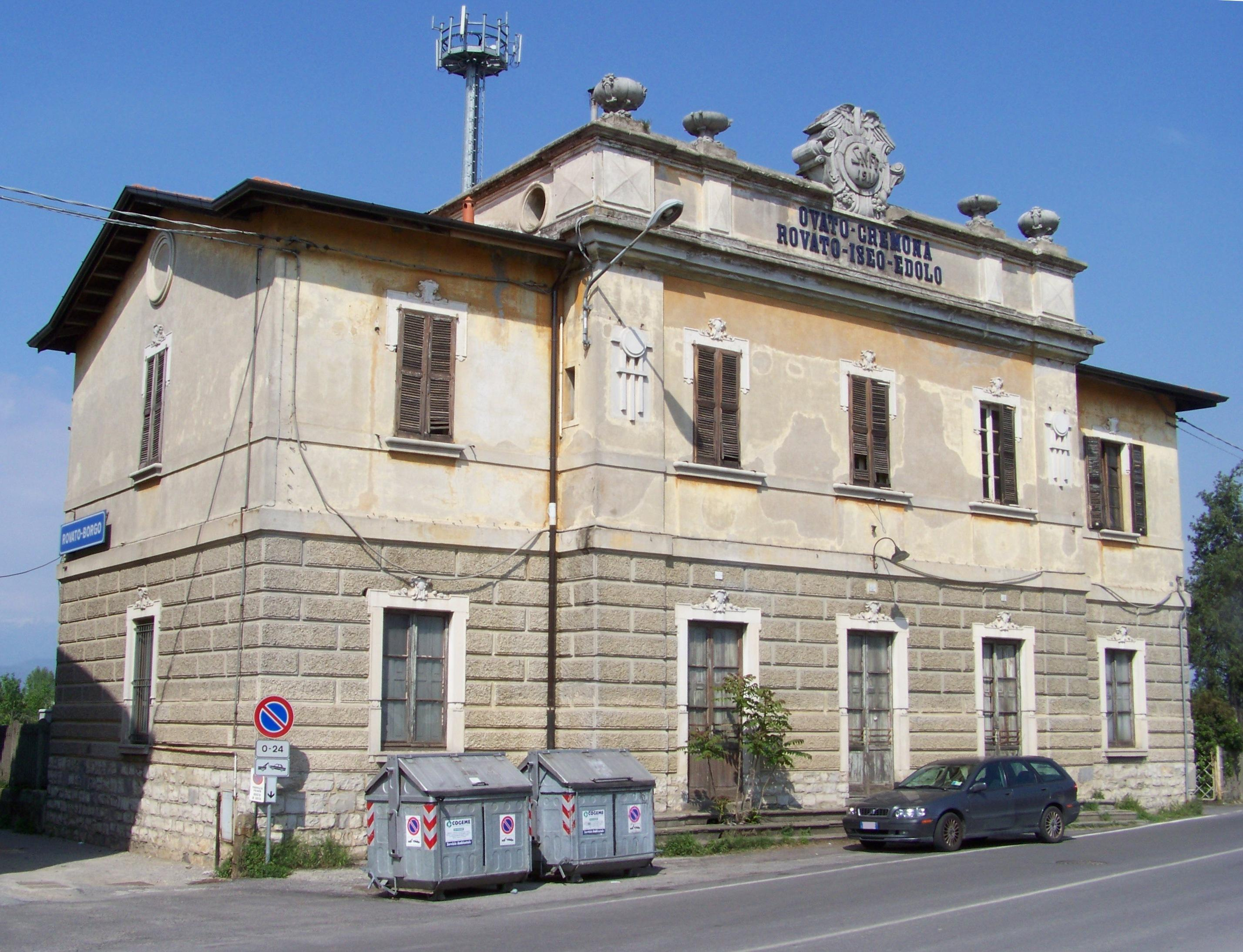
- Rovato Borgo railway station

General information
- Location: Viale Lombardia, Rovato, Lombardy; Italy
- Coordinates: 45°33′09″N 10°00′07″E
- Owner: Rete Ferroviaria Italiana
- Operator: Trenord
- Line: Cremona-Iseo railway

History
- Opened: 1911; 115 years ago
Location
- Location within Northern Italy Location within Italy

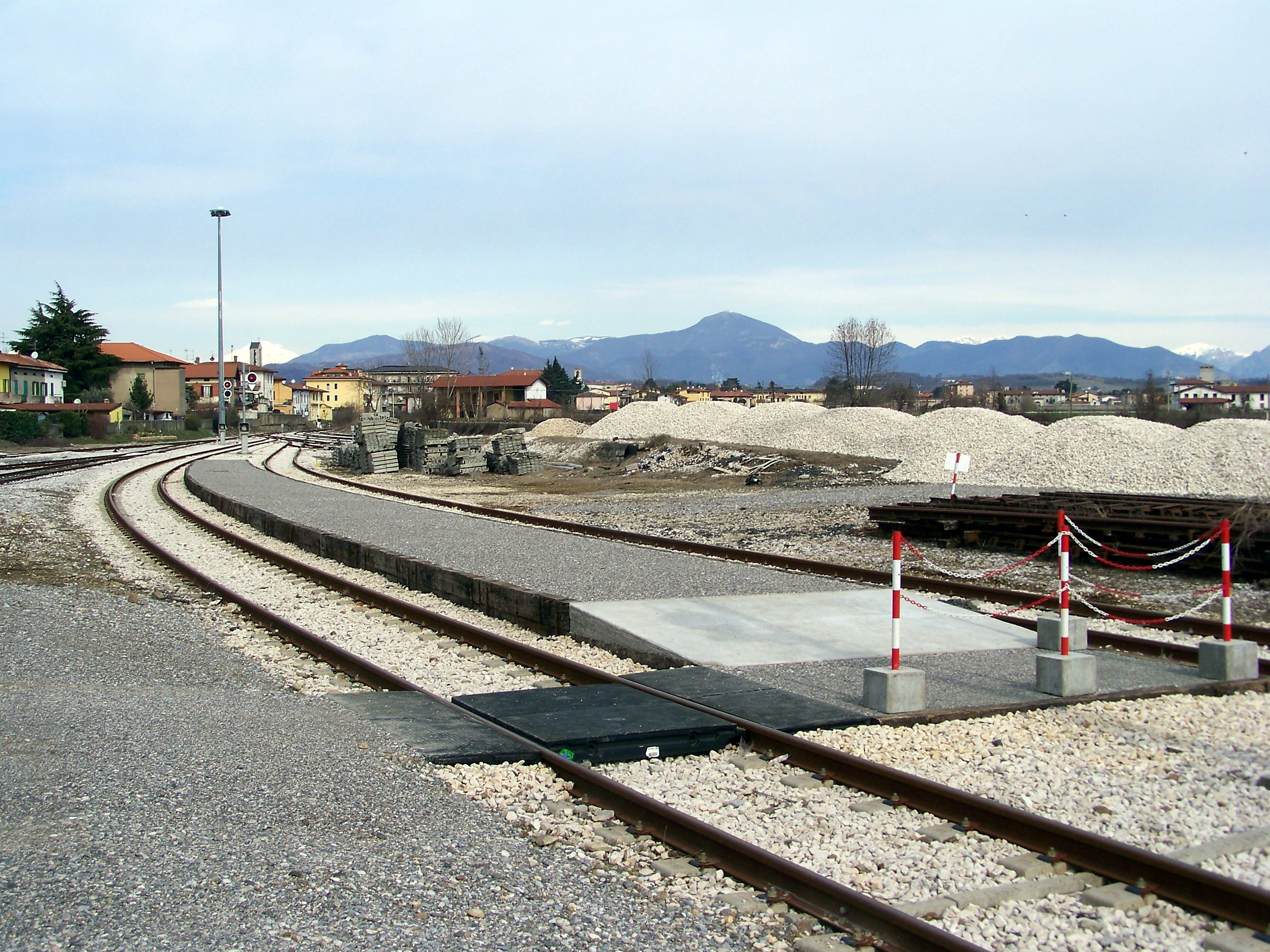
The new platform in use since 2010.

Rovato Borgo (Italian: Stazione di Rovato Borgo) is a railway station serving the town of Rovato, in the region of Lombardy, northern Italy. The station opened in 1911 and is located on the Cremona-Iseo railway line. Train services are operated by the Italian railway company Trenord.

The Milan–Venice railway and Bergamo–Brescia railway pass just south of the station, calling at the main Rovato station.

== History ==
In the 1930s the station gained a yard when the Rovato-Soncino section opened on the Cremona-Iseo railway. After the closure of the line between Rovato and Cremona, the station returned to being a terminus and was used for passenger traffic along the Rovato-Iseo-Edolo section.

Since 1975, when passenger traffic between Bornato and Rovato was suspended until June 2010 the station was used only as a cargo terminal and for storage of rolling stock for Società Nazionale Ferrovie e Tramvie (SNFT) and the former FERROVIENORD. In November 2009 work started on reconnecting the line to the main railway towards Brescia and on 13 June 2010 the passenger service was reactivated on the route Rovato-Bornato, with some trains extended in Iseo. From December 9, 2018 it has been closed.

== Train services ==
The station is served by the following service(s):

- Regional services (Treno regionale) Iseo - Bornato - Rovato

== See also ==
- History of rail transport in Italy
- List of railway stations in Lombardy
- Rail transport in Italy
- Railway stations in Italy
