= Edolo railway station =

Railway station in Italy

Edolo
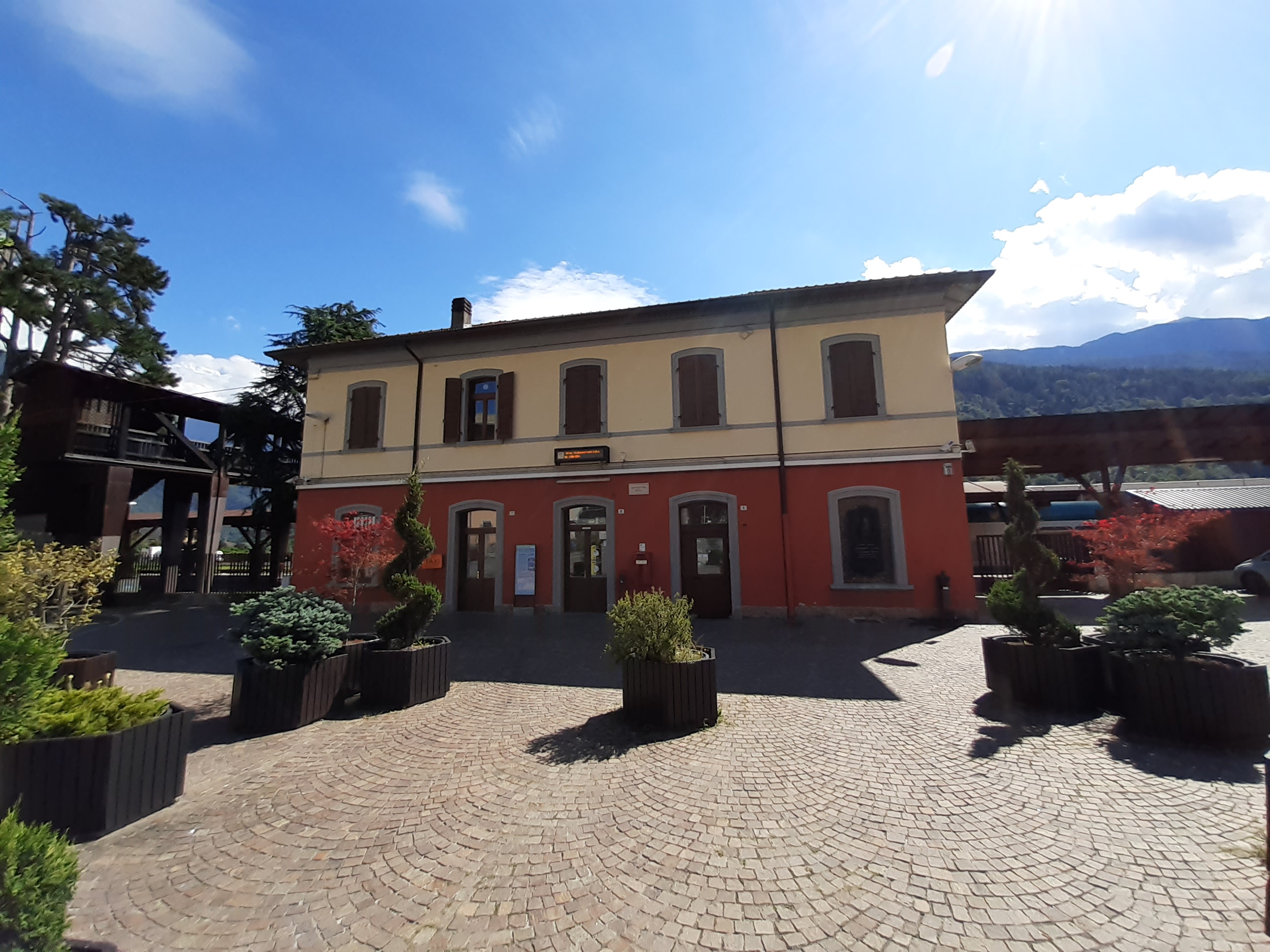

General information
- Location: Edolo, Province of Brescia, Lombardy; Italy
- Coordinates: 46°10′36″N 10°19′47″E
- Owner: Ferrovienord
- Operator: Trenord
- Line: Brescia-Iseo-Edolo railway
- Platforms: 3

History
- Opened: 4 July 1909; 117 years ago
Location
- Location within Italy

Edolo is a railway station in Edolo, Italy. The station is located on the Brescia-Iseo-Edolo railway which opened on 4 July 1909. The train services are operated by Trenord.

== Train services ==
The station is served by the following service(s):

- Regional services (Treno regionale) Edolo – Iseo – Brescia
