= Calcio, Lombardy =

Calcio
- Comune
- Comune di Calcio
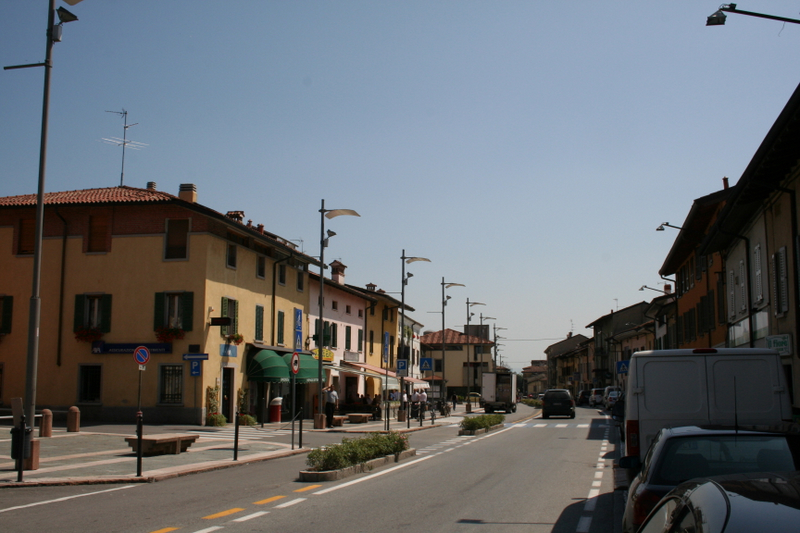
- View from the centre

- Coat of arms

- Location within Italy Location within Lombardy
- Coordinates: 45°30′N 9°50′E
- Country: Italy
- Region: Lombardy
- Province: Province of Bergamo (BG)

Area
  - Total: 15 km^{2} (5.8 sq mi)
- Elevation: 123 m (404 ft)

Population (28 February 2007)
  - Total: 5,083
  - Density: 340/km^{2} (880/sq mi)
- Demonym: Calcensi
- Time zone: UTC+1 (CET)
  - Summer (DST): UTC+2 (CEST)
- Postal code: 24054
- Dialing code: 0363
- Patron saint: San Vittore
- Saint day: 28 July
- Website: Official website

Calcio (Bergamasque: Cals) is a town and comune in the province of Bergamo, Lombardy, Italy.

Among the churches in the town is the parish church of San Vittore.

== Sport ==
- U.S.O. Calcio

== Transport ==
- Cividate al Piano-Calcio railway station
