= A2n 001 railcar =

Experimental Diesel Railcar

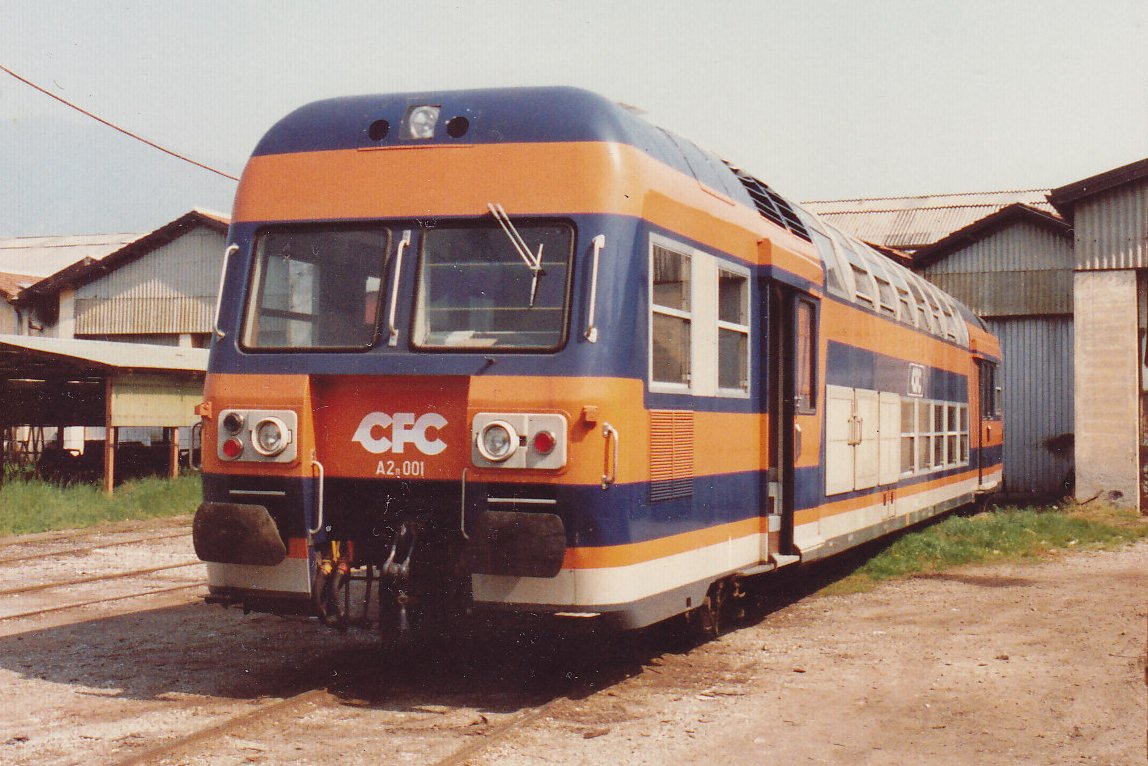
Type and origin
- Power type: Diesel
- Builder: CaFiCi
- Build date: 1982
- Total produced: 1
Specifications
- Gauge: 1,435 mm (4 ft 8 1/2 in)
- Wheel diameter: 860 mm (34 in)
- Loco weight: 55 t (empty)
- Transmission: hydraulic
Career
- Locale: Italy, Mauritania

The A2n 001 was an experimental diesel railcar built in Italy by CaFiCi consortium in 1982. Despite a long test period in several regional lines, the vehicle never came into regular service.

== Technical details ==
The railcar was designed taking advantage of the experience developed in the construction of two decks vehicles gained in Italy by the Casaralta workshops (Bologna) in building railways carriages derived from those in service on the Parisian "banlieue" and supplied to Ferrovie Nord Milano and Ferrovie dello Stato companies. Such vehicles were built under CIMT Lorraine (a French firm) license.

The experiment was focused on the research on a lightweight vehicle with higher capacity than railcars used at that time. The objective was to provide regional and branch lines with such vehicles, with an offer estimated at about 40-50% more passengers than equivalent traditional railcars, despite the "low power consumption and a saving of about 20% in investment and running costs".

It was designed a curious double-decker railcar reminiscent of the similar coaches of the time. The vehicle was built by a company called Cafici International, with headquarters in Geneva; the name came from the initials of the three partners who formed that consortium: Casaralta (Bologna, Italy) CIMT- Lorraine (France) and Fiat Ferroviaria (Savigliano, Italy), a specialist in the construction of lightweight material.

The engine was supplied by Fiat (Iveco 828 SRI engine 4-stroke, V8) and installed in only one of the two carriages, which were derived from those equipped on the double-decker coaches then being delivered by Casaralta, with secondary air suspension and brake discs and mixed strains.

The arrangement of space was such as to create in practice four distinct rooms: the two vestibules allow access to the front and rear rooms, a total capacity of 17, and the two central decks, with a capacity of 60 seats respectively the upper and 48 lower.

== History ==
Released from the factory in 1982, the following year the vehicle was tested on some lines in Piemonte region, covering several times the Turin-Trofarello and Fossano-Limone Piemonte paths.

In 1984, after several weeks of testing on the ACT (Reggio Emilia) network and along the Suzzara-Ferrara Railway (FSF), the railcar moved back in Piemonte and in the French Riviera, where on behalf of the SNCF was the subject of different test runs on the Cuneo-Nice, where the low power of the one engine was put to the test by ramps imposed by the Maritime Alps, highlighting not brilliant performances.

The FIAT organized later, in 1986, a further series of test runs on Brescia-Iseo-Edolo (Valcamonica railway) whose owner, SNFT, judged the railcar unsuitable for the demanding services. In the same period, with the formula of loan use, the railcar was also used by SATTI for services on the Canavesana railway.

The first buyer of A2n 001 appeared in 1988, when the Swiss association "Vapeur Val-de-Traves" bought and moved it in its Neuchâtel depot; however, using the railcar on an occasional basis.

A new change of ownership took place in 1997, when the railcar was purchased by SNIM - National Society of Industries and Mines of Mauritania which, after installation of air conditioning, aimed to employ it again in a tourist service on the relationship Nouadhibou-Zouérate.

Due to the low performance and to its nature as prototype the railcar was finally de-motorized and today is still occasionally used as trailer on tourist service "The train of the desert."
