= San Vittore, Calcio =

Church building in Calcio, Italy

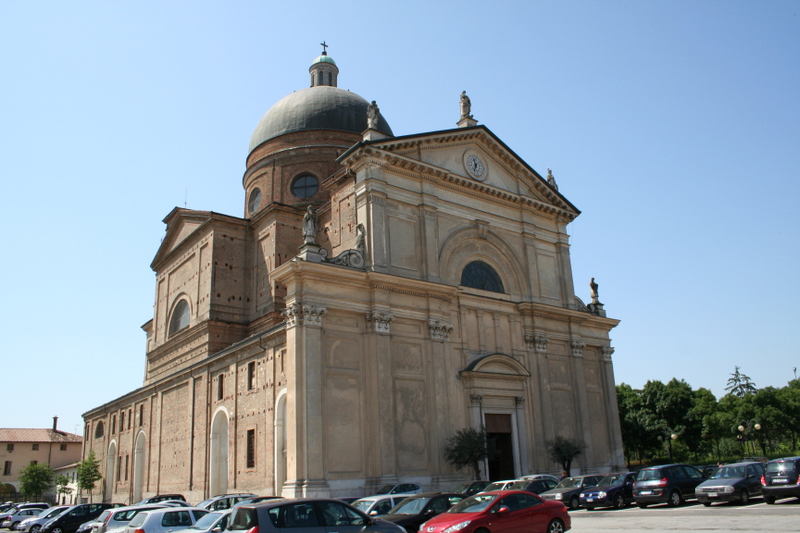

San Vittore is a neoclassical-style Roman Catholic parish church in the town of Calcio, province of Bergamo, region of Lombardy, Italy.

== History ==
Construction of the church began in 1770, but was interrupted in 1792, and not restarted until 1833. The designs of an architect Bianconi were not complete until 1880. The facade was finished with an accumulation of pilasters; the roofline has statues by Belcaro.

The elaborate interiors were completed in the late 19th and early twentieth century. The spandrels were originally painted by Trecourt and then refurbished in 1876 by Antonio Guadagnini. The stucco statues of the apostles were completed by Gerolamo Count Oldofredi Tadini of Calcio. Many of the altarpieces derive from suppressed or razed churches in the region, and include works by Enea Salmeggia and a Mystical Marriage of St Catherine by Marco Antonio Mainardi. The ceiling and apse frescoes (1934) were completed by Umberto Marigliani.
