= Umberto Marigliani =

Italian painter

Umberto Marigliani (1885–1960) was an Italian painter, active in Northern Italy, painting sacred subjects.

== Biography ==
He trained under Cesare Tallone and Ponziano Loverini at the Accademia Carrara, then at the Scuola d’arte Andrea Fantoni. He then worked under Fermo Taragni. In 1907, he helped fresco the ceiling of the church of Sant’Antonio Abbandonato, near Val Brembilla.

Nicknamed Tiepolino for his rapid fresco execution, he was active in Liguria and Switzerland. He helped found in 1913 the Società degli acquafortisti bergamaschi, and in 1938 made designs for the windows of the Sanctuary of Pompei. He also painted for the church of San Vittore, Calcio.

He painted the Procession of Virgins and Martyrs and the fourteen stations of the cross in the Shrine of Lovere Saints in Lovere
