= Bergamo–Brescia railway =

Railway line in Italy

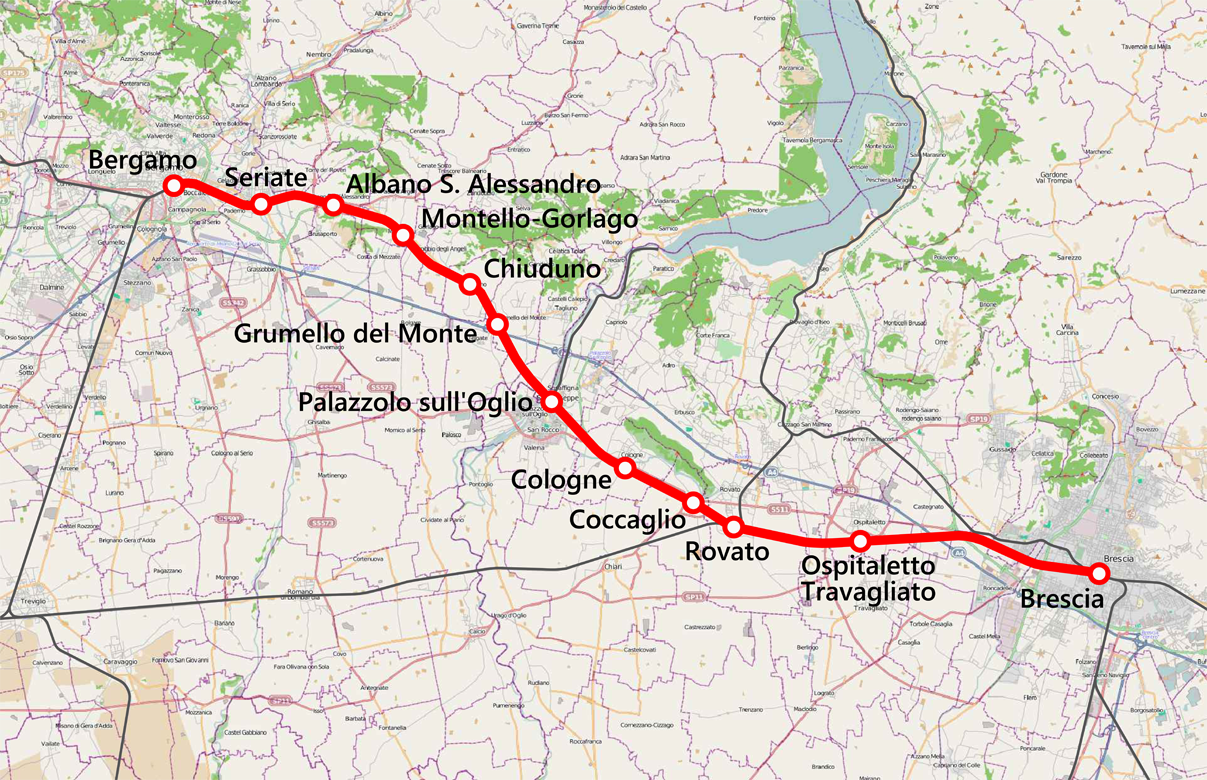

Overview
- Status: in use
- Owner: RFI
- Locale: Lombardy, Italy
- Termini: Bergamo; Brescia
- Stations: 12

Service
- Type: heavy rail
- Services: R1
- Route number: 186
- Operator(s): Trenord

History
- Opened: 1854

Technical
- Line length: 49 km (30 mi)
- Number of tracks: 1
- Track gauge: 1,435 mm (4 ft 8 1/2 in) standard gauge
- Electrification: 3 kV DC overhead line

The Bergamo–Brescia railway is a railway line in Lombardy, Italy.

The railway from Bergamo to Brescia was opened between 1854 and 1857 as a part of the original connection between Milan and Venice.

== See also ==
- List of railway lines in Italy
