= Rovato =

Rovato Ruàt
- Comune
- Comune di Rovato
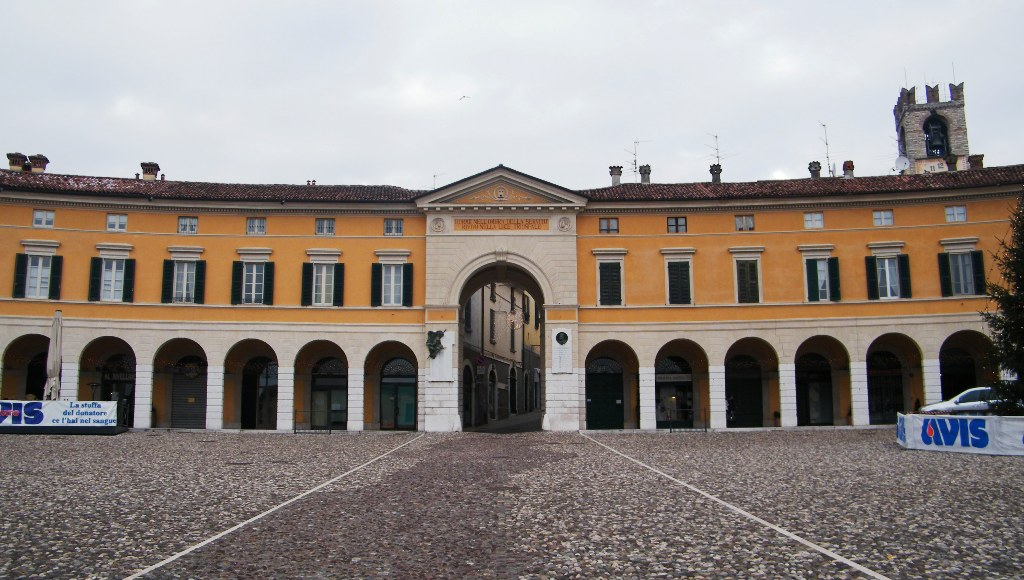
- Portico of Piazza Cavour.

- Location within Italy Location within Lombardy
- Coordinates: 45°34′N 09°59′E
- Country: Italy
- Region: Lombardy
- Province: Brescia (BS)
- Frazioni: Bargnana, Duomo, Lodetto, San Carlo, San Giorgio, San Giuseppe, Sant'Andrea, Sant'Anna

Government
  - Mayor: Tiziano Alessandro Belotti

Area
  - Total: 26.10 km^{2} (10.08 sq mi)
- Elevation: 192 m (630 ft)

Population (28 February 2017)
  - Total: 19,119
  - Density: 732.5/km^{2} (1,897/sq mi)
- Demonym: Rovatesi
- Time zone: UTC+1 (CET)
  - Summer (DST): UTC+2 (CEST)
- Postal code: 25038
- Dialing code: 030
- Patron saint: St. Charles Borromeo
- Saint day: November 4
- Website: Official website

Rovato (Brescian: Ruàt) is a comune in the province of Brescia, in Lombardy, northern Italy. Neighbouring towns are Coccaglio, Erbusco and Cazzago San Martino. It is located in the Franciacorta hills, 11 km south of Lake Iseo and 18 km west of Brescia.

== Transport ==
- Rovato railway station
- Rovato Borgo railway station
- Rovato Città railway station
