= Ferrovienord =

Italian railway company

FERROVIENORD S.p.A.
- Company type: Società per azioni
- Industry: Rail transport
- Founded: Milan, Italy (1985)
- Headquarters: Milan, Italy
- Key people: Belingardi Vittorio, Luigi Legnani
- Products: Rail infrastructure
- Revenue: € 84,013,421 (2008)
- Net income: € 3,468,270 (2008)
- Number of employees: 931 (2008)
- Parent: Ferrovie Nord Milano
- Website: www.ferrovienord.it

Ferrovienord (prior to 2006, Ferrovie Nord Milano Esercizio) is an Italian transport company managing the network of regional railway concessions owned by the group in northern Italy. It is a subsidiary of Ferrovie Nord Milano.

== History ==
The company was founded in 1985, as part of the transformation of Ferrovie Nord Milano SpA (FNM), a holding company. Its original name was Ferrovie Nord Milano Esercizio (FNME) and its objects were the management and maintenance of the FMN rail network and transport services on the network.

In 1987, the FNM, together with the Province of Brescia and the Società Nazionale Ferrovie e Tramvie (SNFT), formed the Consorzio Brescia Nord (English: Consortium of Brescia North), the task of which was to take over the SNFT's concession for the Brescia–Iseo–Edolo railway. Five years later, the FNM acquired the SNFT, and took over its stake in the Consortium. Consequently, on 1 January 1993 the FNME received from its parent, the FNM, the right to operate the railway that had previously been exercised by the SNFT, and assumed its direct management.

In 2004, the FNM group adhered to the principle of accounting separation between infrastructure management and transport services. The FNME has since been managing the network and stations of the FNM group, while the departments related to passenger rail and freight were split from the holding company and allocated to two new companies. The Ferrovie Nord Milano Trasporti S.r.l. (now known as LeNORD) obtained the management of passenger traffic, while the Ferrovie Nord Cargo S.r.l. took over goods traffic.

On 15 May 2006, following a process of redefinition of the corporate identity of all group companies, the FNME was renamed FERROVIENORD.

== Activities ==
The company specializes in the management of a 319 km (198 mi) long rail network and its 120 stations.

The activity is organized into two sections: the Milan branch and Iseo branch.

The Milan branch takes care of the regional line concessions operated by the group linking Milan with Brianza, Erba, Varese, Como, Novara, Brescia and Milan-Malpensa Airport. In particular, the railway lines under its responsibility are:

- Milan–Seveso–Asso (including the Seveso–Camnago branch);
- Milan–Saronno;
- Saronno–Novara (including the Sacconago–Malpensa branch);
- Saronno–Como;
- Saronno–Varese–Laveno;
- Saronno–Seregno (temporarily closed until June 2012).

The Iseo branch of the company deals with the management of the Brescia–Iseo–Edolo and the Bornato–Rovato branch.

All lines are electrified at a voltage of 3000 volts DC, with the exception of two lines operated using diesel traction: Brescia–Edolo and Bornato–Rovato.

== See also ==
- LeNORD
- NordCargo
- Servizio ferroviario suburbano di Milano
- Marco Giovanni Piuri
