= Trenord =

Italian railway company

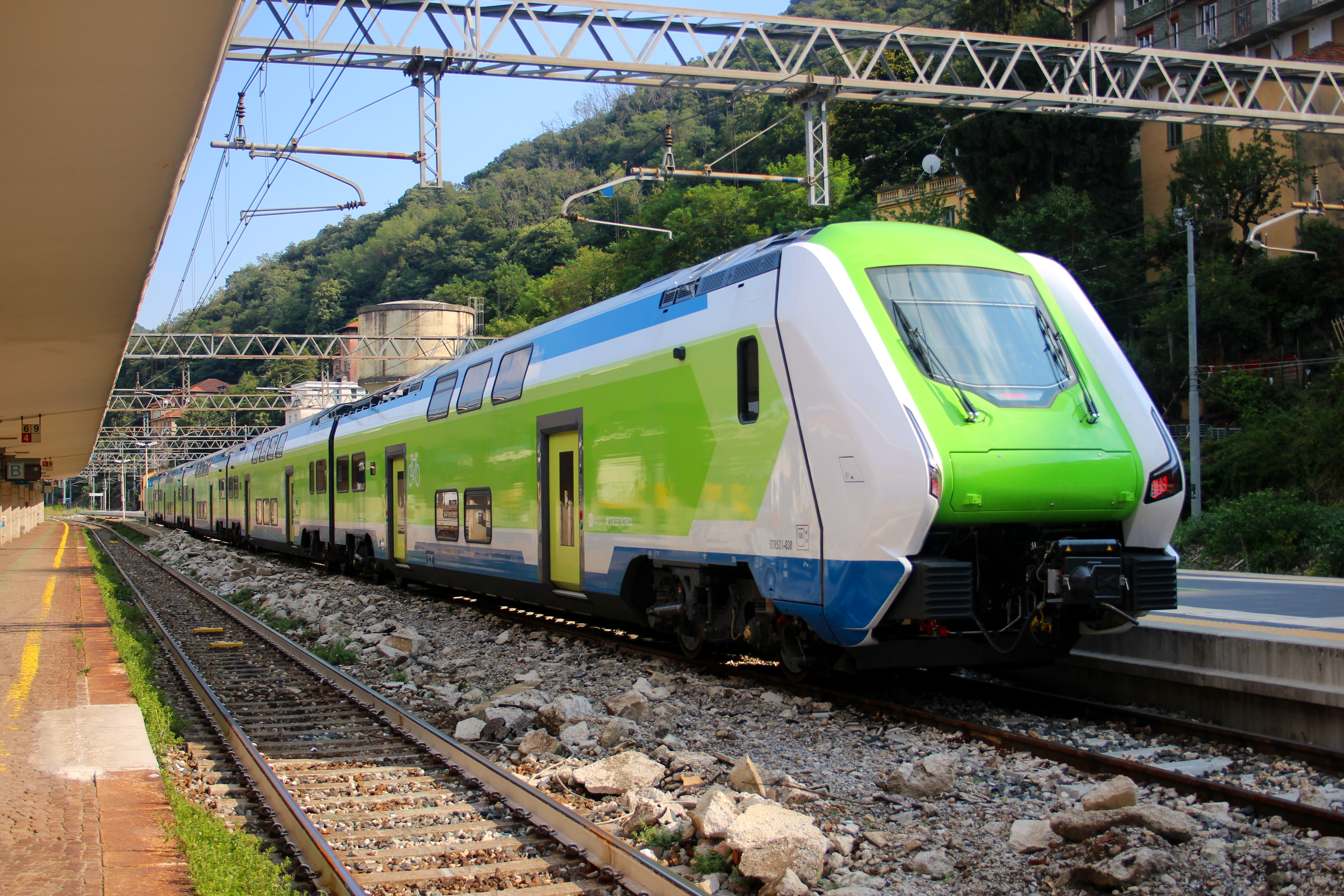
- Company type: Società a responsabilità limitata
- Industry: Public transport
- Founded: 2009
- Headquarters: Milan, Italy
- Key people: Federica Santini (President); Marco Piuri (CEO)
- Services: Rail transport
- Revenue: €995 million (2023)
- Net income: €19.017 million (2023)
- Number of employees: 4,720 (2023)
- Website: Official website

Trenord is a railway company which is responsible for the operation of regional and suburban passenger trains mainly in Lombardy. The company was established by the two main railway companies in Lombardy, Trenitalia and Ferrovie Nord Milano (FNM), to manage train operations in the region. The equity is equally divided between the two companies.

In 2023, the company provided service to about 190 million passengers, nearly 26 percent more than the 151 million in the previous year, reaching an average of more than 700,000 passengers on weekdays.

== History ==
Trenitalia LeNord (TLN) was founded in Milan on 4 August 2009 from the merging of LeNord, company owned by FNM, and the Lombardy regional division of Trenitalia.

The first step of the new company was the opening of a new maintenance and cleaning center for trains in Lombardy, the biggest in Italy.

Trenitalia and LeNord rented their Lombardy regional trains divisions to the company on 30 October 2009 for 11 months. After this trial period the rent was extended to the end of 2010. After this date, the rent was again extended twice to 31 March and finally to 1 May 2011, when the company was renamed Trenord.

The last agreement included also the Trenitalia control over TiLo and the EuroCity service by LeNord in partnership with Deutsche Bahn and ÖBB, all merged into the new company.

In the 2010s there was a deficiency in rolling stock and personnel so the company took a massive investment in rolling stock and hired and trained lots of people.

== Routes ==
Trenord inherited Trenitalia and LeNord operations in Lombardy. It therefore operates 42 regional lines, 12 suburban lines, the Malpensa Express, and co-operates the EuroCity in Italy in cooperation with Deutsche Bahn and Österreichische Bundesbahnen. There are 2200 rides per day, serving 650,000 people on the 1,920 km (1,190 mi) long regional network. The infrastructure is owned by Rete Ferroviaria Italiana (RFI) and Ferrovienord.

=== Regional lines ===
List of Trenord regional lines:

- Alessandria – Voghera – Piacenza
- Arona – Gallarate – Busto Arsizio
- Asso – Milan
- Bergamo – Brescia
- Bergamo – Carnate – Milan
- Bergamo – Pioltello – Milan
- Bergamo – Treviglio
- Bornato – Rovato
- Brescia – Breno
- Brescia – Edolo
- Brescia – Parma
- Busto Arsizio – Malpensa Airport
- Chiasso – Como – Milan
- Codogno – Cremona
- Colico – Chiavenna
- Como – Lecco
- Como – Saronno – Milan
- Cremona – Brescia
- Cremona – Mantua
- Cremona – Treviglio
- Gallarate – Milan
- Domodossola – Milan
- Laveno – Varese – Saronno – Milan
- Lecco – Bergamo
- Lecco – Molteno – Monza
- Lecco – Sondrio
- Luino – Gallarate
- Luino – Novara – Alessandria
- Mantova – Cremona – Codogno – Milan
- Mortara – Milan
- Novara – Saronno – Milan
- Pavia – Alessandria
- Pavia – Codogno
- Pavia – Vercelli
- Piacenza – Lodi – Milan
- Sondrio – Tirano
- Stradella – Pavia – Milan
- Tirano – Sondrio – Lecco – Milan
- Varese – Gallarate – Milan
- Varese – Saronno – Milan
- Verona – Brescia – Milan
- Voghera – Pavia – Milan

== Rolling stock ==
The company's rolling stock comprises 1850 items, inherited from Trenitalia regional division and from LeNord.

As of December 2023, the Trenord rolling stock comprises:

- Electric locomotives:
  - E.464;
- Multiple unit and rail carriage:
  - Media Distanza con Vestiboli Centrali (MDVC);
  - Media Distanza con Vestiboli Estremi (MDVE);
  - Carrozza vicinale a piano ribassato;
  - Double deck carriages;
  - Vivalto;
- Railcars:
  - ALn 668;
  - ATR125 and ATR115.
  - Colleoni (train) based on Stadler FLIRT and coded ATR 803;
- Electric multiple units:
  - Treno Servizio Regionale;
  - Treno ad alta frequentazione;
  - Caravaggio (train) known as ETR 421, ETR 521 and ETR 521 S1;
  - Donizzetti (train) named ETR 204;
  - Alstom Coradia divided in ETR 245 (or CSA) for Malpensa Express service from Milan Cadorna and Milan Centrale and ETR 425 for regional train service.

As of early 2011, Trenord has started to replace some of the older rolling stocks (such as the Class ALn 668 railcar) with the newer Class ATR125. These newer trains include features such as through carriages, digital information display, air conditioning, and electronic door controls.

As of December 2023, the new rolling stock comprised 79 Caravaggios, 37 Donizzettis and 28 Colleonis.

== See also ==
- Transport in Milan
