= Line S19 (Milan suburban railway service) =

Railway line in Milan, Italy

Milano Rogoredo–Albairate-Vermezzo
- S19

Overview
- Status: Operational
- Locale: Milan, Italy
- Termini: Milano Rogoredo; Albairate-Vermezzo
- Stations: 10
- Website: Trenord (in Italian)

Service
- Type: Commuter rail
- System: Milan suburban railway service
- Route number: S19
- Rolling stock: Treno Servizio Regionale

History
- Opened: 2025

Technical
- Track gauge: 1,435 mm (4 ft 8 1/2 in)
- Electrification: 3,000 V DC

The S19 is a commuter rail route forming part of the Milan suburban railway service (Italian: Servizio ferroviario suburbano di Milano), which converges on the city of Milan, Italy.

The route, new for 2025, runs on the south belt of Milan's railway network. It follows mostly the same path as the S9 line, and was created to increase train frequencies on the route two months before the opening of the Milano-Cortina Winter Olympics, since the Olympic village is located in close proximity to the Scalo Romana station. Like all but one of the other Milan suburban railway service routes, it is operated by Trenord.

== Route ==
- Milano Rogoredo ↔ Albairate-Vermezzo

Line S19, a cross-city route, initially heads West from Milano Rogoredo through the southern belt line. At the second station, Milano Scalo Romana, it meets line S9, and the rest of the route is shared between them. It serves the recently-opened Milano Tibaldi station, then Milano Romolo and Milano San Cristoforo stations before leaving the city of Milan. It continues South-West for five more stations and terminates at Albairate-Vermezzo.

== History ==
The route was activated on 13 December 2025, to coincide with the introduction of the 2025/26 winter timetable. It doubled train frequencies on the southern belt line just as Milano Porta Genova station was shut down and two months in advance of Milano Scalo Romana station becoming a central hub during the Milano-Cortina Winter Olympics, being the site of the Olympic village.

== Stations ==
The stations on the S19 are as follows (the stations with a coloured background are within the municipality of Milan):

Station	Opened	Interchange
Milano Rogoredo	1862	Treni regionali
Milano Scalo Romana	1931	Lodi (100 meters)
Milano Tibaldi	2022	Line S9 (Milan suburban railway service)
Milano Romolo	2006	Milan Metro Line 2 Line S9 (Milan suburban railway service)
Milano San Cristoforo	1915	Treni regionali
Corsico	2009	Line S9 (Milan suburban railway service)
Cesano Boscone	2009	Line S9 (Milan suburban railway service)
Trezzano sul Naviglio	1987	Line S9 (Milan suburban railway service)
Gaggiano	1870	Line S9 (Milan suburban railway service)
Albairate-Vermezzo	2009	Treni regionali

== Scheduling ==
As of 2025, S19 trains ran at half-hourly intervals, departing between 05:41 and 23:31 from Milano Rogoredo and between 06:16 and 23:46 from Albairate-Vermezzo. Between the 2nd and the 23rd of February 2026 departure times are extended to 02:01 in the morning from Rogoredo and 02:16 from Albairate-Vermezzo.

== See also ==
- History of rail transport in Italy
- List of Milan suburban railway stations
- Rail transport in Italy
- Transport in Milan
