= Cesano Maderno–Groane railway station =

Railway station in Italy

Cesano Maderno–Groane

General information
- Location: Cesano Maderno, Monza and Brianza, Lombardy; Italy
- Coordinates: 45°37′49″N 09°07′37″E
- Operator: Ferrovienord
- Line: Saronno–Seregno
- Distance: 29.829 km (18.535 mi) from Milano Cadorna
- Platforms: ?
- Train operators: Trenord

Other information
- Fare zone: STIBM: Mi5

History
- Opened: 22 June 2013; 13 years ago

Services
Preceding station	Trenord	Following station
Ceriano Laghetto–Groane towards Saronno	Line S9 (Milan suburban railway service)	Cesano Maderno towards Albairate–Vermezzo
Location
- Location within Lombardy Location within Northern Italy Location within Italy

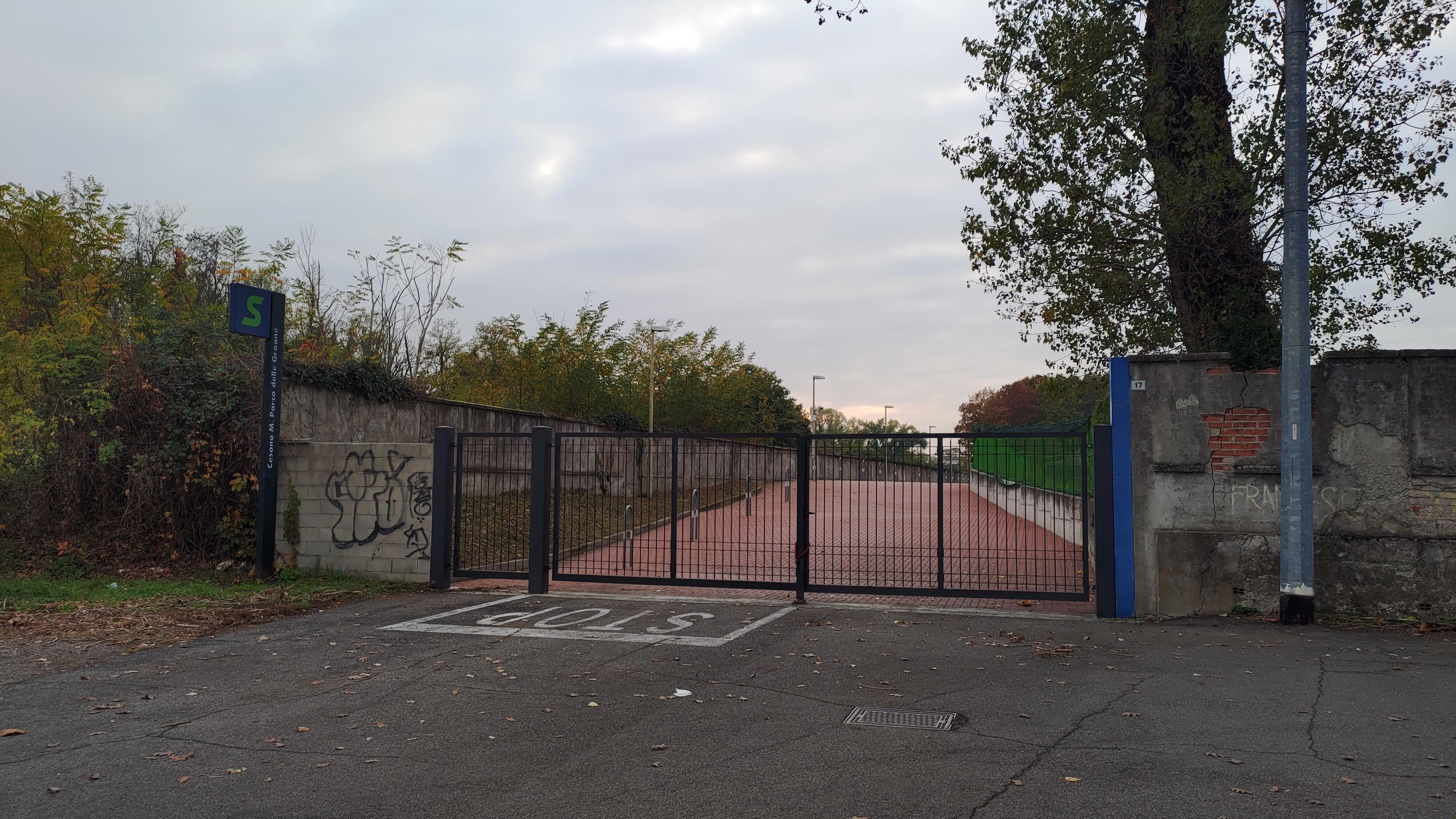
Cesano Maderno station Groane Park

Cesano Maderno–Groane railway station is a railway station in Italy. Located on the Saronno–Seregno railway, it serves the municipality of Cesano Maderno, and particularly the Groane Park.

== Services ==
Cesano Maderno–Groane is served by line S9 of the Milan suburban railway network, operated by the Lombard railway company Trenord.

== See also ==
- Milan suburban railway network
