= Ceriano Laghetto–Groane railway station =

Railway station in Italy

Ceriano Laghetto–Groane

General information
- Location: Ceriano Laghetto, Monza and Brianza, Lombardy; Italy
- Coordinates: 45°37′39″N 09°06′03″E
- Operator: FERROVIENORD
- Line: Saronno–Seregno
- Distance: 27.739 km (17.236 mi) from Milano Cadorna
- Platforms: ?
- Train operators: Trenord

Other information
- Fare zone: STIBM: Mi6

History
- Opened: 9 December 2012; 13 years ago

Services
Preceding station	Trenord	Following station
Ceriano Laghetto–Solaro towards Saronno	Line S9 (Milan suburban railway service)	Cesano Maderno–Groane towards Albairate–Vermezzo
Location
- Location within Lombardy Location within Northern Italy Location within Italy

Ceriano Laghetto–Groane railway station is a railway station in Italy. Located on the Saronno–Seregno railway, it serves the municipality of Ceriano Laghetto, and particularly the Groane Park.

== Services ==
Ceriano Laghetto–Groane is served by line S9 of the Milan suburban railway service, operated by the Lombard railway company Trenord.

== See also ==
- Milan suburban railway service
