= Sant'Ambrogio (Milan Metro) =

Milan metro station

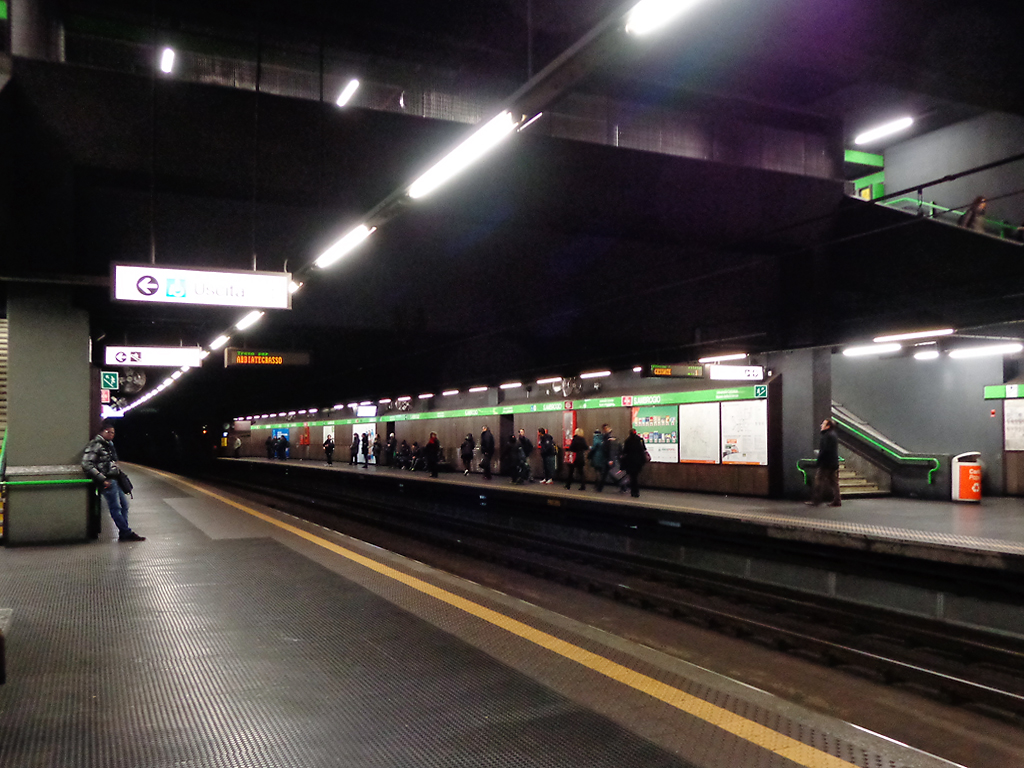

General information
- Location: Via Giosuè Carducci, Milan
- Coordinates: 45°27′42″N 9°10′24″E
- Owner: Azienda Trasporti Milanesi
- Platforms: 3 (2 for line 2, 1 for line 4)
- Tracks: 4

Construction
- Structure type: Underground
- Accessible: yes

Other information
- Fare zone: STIBM: Mi1

History
- Opened: 30 October 1983; 42 years ago

Services
Preceding station	Milan Metro	Following station
Sant'Agostino towards Assago or Abbiategrasso	Line 2	Cadorna towards Cologno Nord or Gessate
Coni Zugna towards San Cristoforo FS	Line 4	De Amicis towards Linate Aeroporto
Location

Sant'Ambrogio is an underground station on Line 2 and Line 4 of the Milan Metro. It was opened on 30 October 1983 as part of the extension of line 2 from Cadorna to Porta Genova. The station takes the name from nearby Basilica of Saint Ambrose.

The station is located at the intersection of Via Giosuè Carducci and Via San Vittore, in Municipality 1, close to the Catholic University and the Milan National Museum of Science and Technology.

It is one of the stations on Line 2 with no central support columns between the two tracks, similarly to Moscova and Loreto.

Since 12 October 2024, the station serve as a transfer point between lines 2 and 4, through an open-air passage next to the Saint Ambrose Postern.
