= Seveso–Baruccana railway station =

Railway station in Italy

Seveso–Baruccana

General information
- Location: Seveso, Monza and Brianza, Lombardy; Italy
- Coordinates: 45°38′16″N 09°09′43″E
- Operator: Ferrovienord
- Line: Saronno–Seregno
- Distance: 32.828 km (20.398 mi) from Milano Cadorna
- Platforms: 1
- Train operators: Trenord

Other information
- Fare zone: STIBM: Mi6

History
- Opened: 9 December 2012; 13 years ago

Services
Preceding station	Trenord	Following station
Cesano Maderno towards Saronno	Line S9 (Milan suburban railway service)	Seregno towards Albairate–Vermezzo
Location
- Location within Lombardy Location within Northern Italy Location within Italy

Seveso–Baruccana railway station is a railway station in Italy. Located on the Saronno–Seregno railway, it serves the hamlet of Baruccana, in the municipality of Seveso.

== Services ==
Seveso–Baruccana is served by line S9 of the Milan suburban railway network, operated by the Lombard railway company Trenord.

== See also ==
- Milan suburban railway network
