= Ceriano Laghetto–Solaro railway station =

Railway station in Italy

Ceriano Laghetto–Solaro
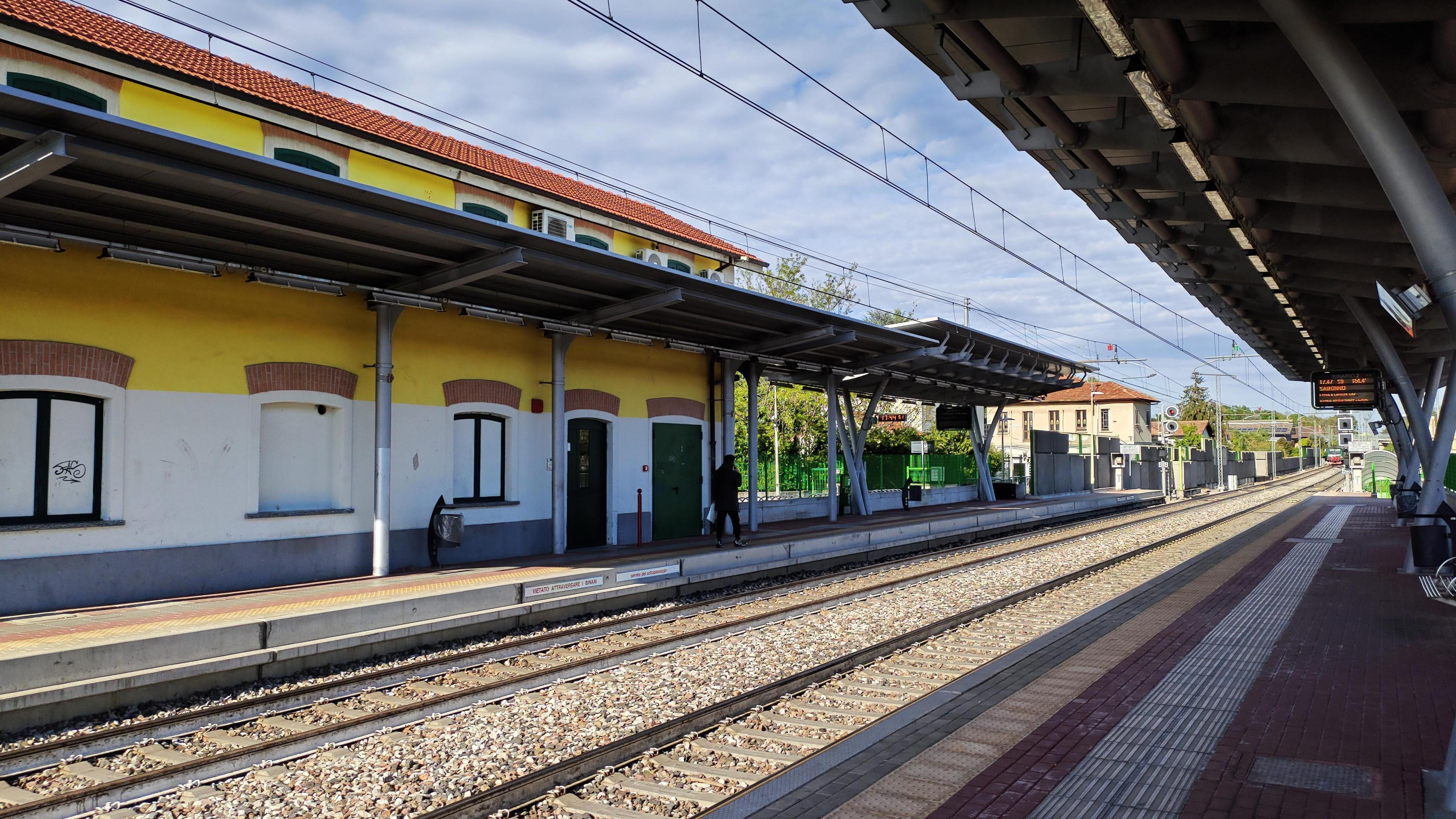
- Ceriano Larghetto Station

General information
- Location: Ceriano Laghetto, Monza and Brianza, Lombardy; Italy
- Coordinates: 45°37′30″N 09°04′46″E
- Operator: Ferrovienord
- Line: Saronno–Seregno
- Distance: 26.164 km (16.258 mi) from Milano Cadorna
- Platforms: ?
- Train operators: Trenord

Other information
- Fare zone: STIBM: Mi5

History
- Opened: 9 December 2012; 13 years ago

Services
Preceding station	Trenord	Following station
Saronno Sud towards Saronno	Line S9 (Milan suburban railway service)	Ceriano Laghetto–Groane towards Albairate–Vermezzo
Location
- Location within Lombardy Location within Northern Italy Location within Italy

Ceriano Laghetto–Solaro railway station is a railway station in Italy. Located on the Saronno–Seregno railway, it serves the municipalities of Ceriano Laghetto and Solaro.

== Services ==
Ceriano Laghetto–Solaro is served by line S9 of the Milan suburban railway service, operated by the Lombard railway company Trenord.

== See also ==
- Milan suburban railway service
