= Line S9 (Milan suburban railway service) =

Railway line in Lombardy, Italy

Saronno–Albairate-Vermezzo
- S9
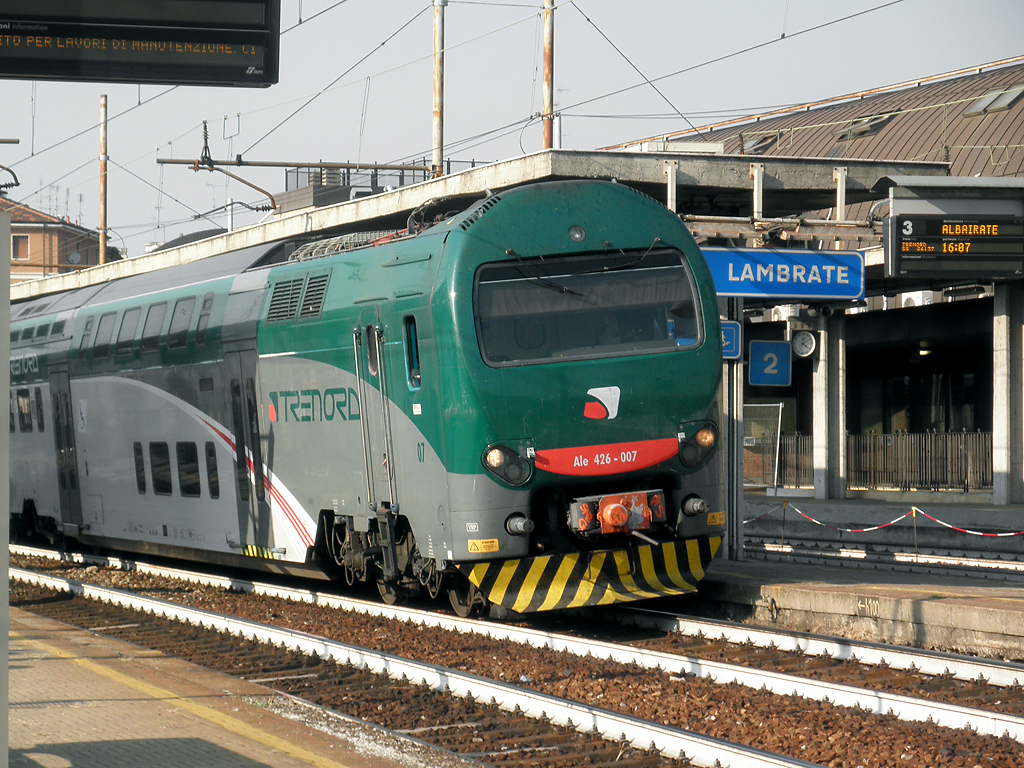
- An S9 train at Milano Lambrate.

Overview
- Status: Operational
- Locale: Lombardy, Italy
- Termini: Saronno; Albairate-Vermezzo
- Stations: 16
- Website: Trenord (in Italian)

Service
- Type: Commuter rail
- System: Milan suburban railway service
- Route number: S9
- Operator(s): Trenord

History
- Opened: 2004

Technical
- Track gauge: 1,435 mm (4 ft 8 1/2 in)
- Electrification: 3,000 V DC
Route map
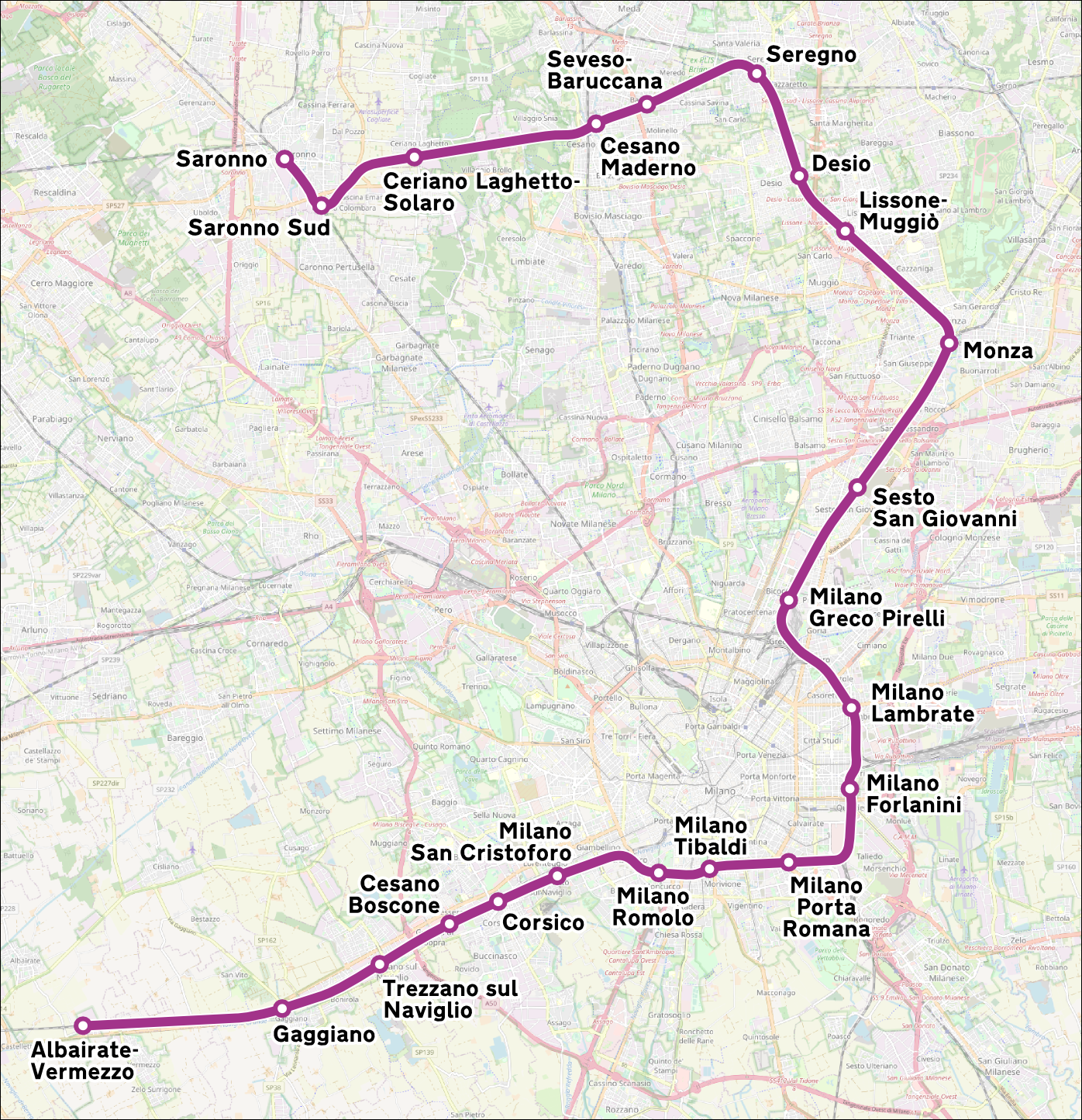
Map of line S9.

The S9 is a commuter rail service of the Milan suburban railway service (Italian: Servizio ferroviario suburbano di Milano) that converges in Milan, Italy.

It uses the Saronno–Seregno, Milan–Chiasso, Milan belt, Milan southern belt and Mortara–Milan railway lines, and is operated by Trenord.

== Route ==
- Saronno ↔ Albairate-Vermezzo

Line S9, a cross-city route, initially heads in an southeasterly direction from Saronno towards Cesano Maderno, Seregno, Monza and Milano Greco Pirelli, then runs via the Milan belt line and southern belt line around the eastern and southern sides of the Milan city centre, before finally heading southwest, to Albairate-Vermezzo.

== History ==
The S9 commenced operation on 24 December 2004, and initially linked Seregno with Milano San Cristoforo. Unlike the other lines in the suburban railway service, which offered services at half-hourly intervals, the S9 ran at a frequency of only one train per hour, in a narrower time band (from 07:00 to 20:00).

Thanks to the activation of the S9, local passenger trains returned to the southern belt line after an absence of 10 years. Another peculiarity of the line at the time was that it was the only one in the suburban railway service not to run along the Passante railway or through Milano Bovisa (which acts as a link between the Passante and the rest of the railway network).

Initially, the S9 was managed by TiLo, a company formed ad hoc by Trenitalia and the Swiss Federal Railways. In March 2008, Trenitalia became the sole operator. Upon the timetable change on 13 December 2009, train services on the line became half-hourly throughout the day.

== Stations ==
The stations on the S9 are as follows (the stations with blue background are in the municipality of Milan):

| Station | Opened | Interchange |
|---|---|---|
| Saronno | 1879 | MXP |
| Saronno Sud | 1991 | Line S1 (Milan suburban railway service) Line S3 (Milan suburban railway service) |
| Ceriano Laghetto-Solaro | 2012 | |
| Ceriano Laghetto-Groane | 2012 | |
| Cesano Maderno-Groane | 2013 | |
| Cesano Maderno | 2011 | Treni regionali |
| Seveso-Baruccana | 2012 | |
| Seregno | 1849 | Treni regionali |
| Desio | 1849 | Line S11 (Milan suburban railway service) |
| Lissone-Muggiò | 1882 | Line S11 (Milan suburban railway service) |
| Monza | 1840 | Treni regionali |
| Sesto San Giovanni | 1969 | Treni regionali |
| Milano Greco Pirelli | 1914 | Treni regionali |
| Milano Lambrate | 1931 | Treni regionali |
| Milano Forlanini | 2015 | Milan Metro Line 4 Line S5 (Milan suburban railway service) Line S6 (Milan suburban railway service) |
| Milano Scalo Romana | 1931 | Lodi (100 meters) |
| Milano Tibaldi | 2022 | Line S19 (Milan suburban railway service) |
| Milano Romolo | 2006 | Milan Metro Line 2 Line S19 (Milan suburban railway service) |
| Milano San Cristoforo | 1915 | Treni regionali |
| Corsico | 2009 | Line S19 (Milan suburban railway service) |
| Cesano Boscone | 2009 | Line S19 (Milan suburban railway service) |
| Trezzano sul Naviglio | 1987 | Line S19 (Milan suburban railway service) |
| Gaggiano | 1870 | Line S19 (Milan suburban railway service) |
| Albairate-Vermezzo | 2009 | Treni regionali |

== See also ==
- History of rail transport in Italy
- List of Milan suburban railway stations
- Rail transport in Italy
- Transport in Milan
