= Solaro =

Solaro may refer to:

== Geography ==
- Solaro, Lombardy, municipality in Lombardy, Italy
- Solaro, Haute-Corse, commune on Corsica, France
- Monte Solaro, a mountain on the island of Capri, Italy
- Villanova Solaro a comune (municipality) in the Province of Cuneo in the Italian region Piedmont
- Ceriano Laghetto-Solaro railway station railway station in Italy. Located on the Saronno–Seregno railway

== People ==
- Solaro (family), medieval bankers
- Clemente Solaro, Count La Margherita (1792–1869), Piedmontese statesman
- Daniello Solaro (c. 1649–1726), Baroque period Italian sculptor active in Genoa and France
- Gianni Solaro (1926–2006) Italian film and television actor
- Soledad Solaro (born 1978) Argentine model and television personality
