= Cormano–Brusuglio railway station =

Railway station in Italy

Cormano–Brusuglio
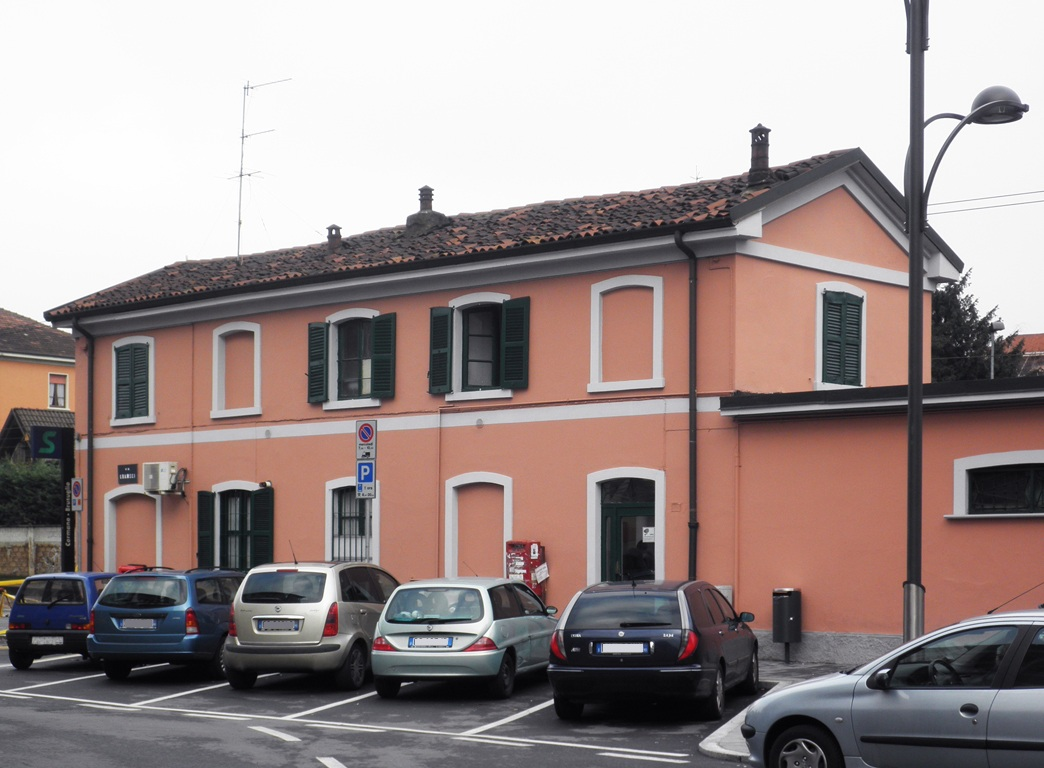

General information
- Location: Via Antonio Gramsci, 1 Cormano, Milan, Lombardy; Italy
- Coordinates: 45°32′31″N 09°10′24″E
- Operator: Ferrovienord
- Line: Milan–Asso
- Platforms: 2
- Train operators: Trenord

History
- Opened: 16 July 1879; 147 years ago
- Closed: 26 April 2015; 11 years ago
- Electrified: May 1929
Location
- Location within Northern Italy

Cormano–Brusuglio railway station was a railway station located in the province of Milan, Lombardy in Italy. It served the town of Cormano and its suburb Brusuglio. The building is still located in Via Antonio Gramsci, but the station was closed and later replaced by the Cormano-Cusano Milanino railway station on 26 April 2015.

== Services ==
Until the station was replaced, Cormano–Brusuglio was served by the Milan–Asso railway, operated by the Lombardy railway company Ferrovie Nord Milano.

== See also ==
- Milan–Asso railway
