= Milano Forlanini railway station =

Railway station in Milan, Italy

Milano Forlanini
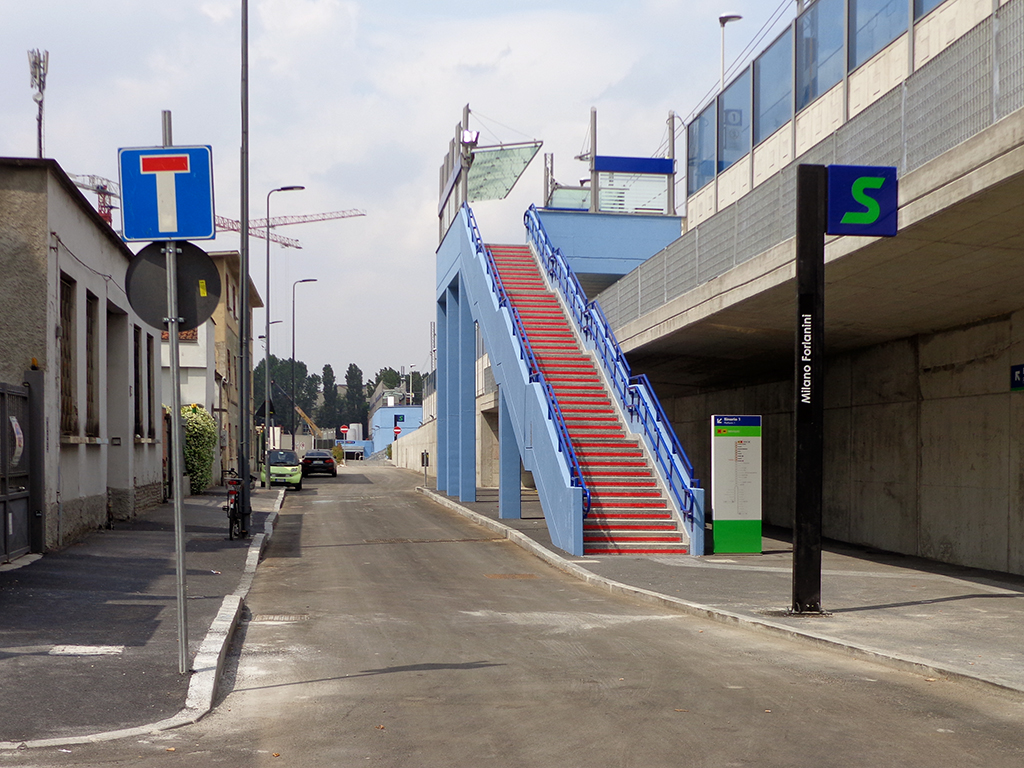
- Milano Forlanini FS

General information
- Location: Viale Enrico Forlanini; Milan, Milan, Lombardy; Italy
- Coordinates: 45°27′50″N 09°14′14″E
- Owner: Rete Ferroviaria Italiana
- Operator: Trenord
- Lines: Milan Passante railway Milan Belt railway Milan–Venice
- Distance: 1.788 km (1.111 mi) from Bivio Lambro to the Milan–Venice railway
- Platforms: 3
- Tracks: 4
- Connections: under construction

Construction
- Structure type: overground

Other information
- Fare zone: STIBM: Mi1
- Classification: Bronze

History
- Opened: 2015; 11 years ago

Services
Preceding station	Trenord	Following station
Milano Porta Vittoria towards Varese	Line S5 (Milan suburban railway service)	Segrate towards Treviglio
Milano Porta Vittoria towards Novara	Line S6 (Milan suburban railway service)	Segrate towards Treviglio
Milano Lambrate towards Saronno	Line S9 (Milan suburban railway service)	Milano Porta Romana towards Albairate–Vermezzo
Location
- Location within Milan Location within Lombardy Location within Northern Italy Location within Italy

Milano Forlanini is an overground railway station in Milan, Italy that serves the southern part of the suburb of Lambrate. It opened in 2015 as part of the Milan Passante railway. It is located on Viale Enrico Forlanini. The train services are operated by Trenord.

It connects with Line 4 of the Milan Metro.

== Train services ==
The station is served by the following services:

- Milan Metropolitan services (S5) Varese - Rho - Milan - Treviglio
- Milan Metropolitan services (S6) Novara - Rho - Milan - Treviglio
- Milan Metropolitan services (S9) Saronno - Seregno - Milan - Albairate

== See also ==
- Railway stations in Milan
- Milan suburban railway service
