= Cesano Boscone railway station =

Railway station in Italy

Cesano Boscone
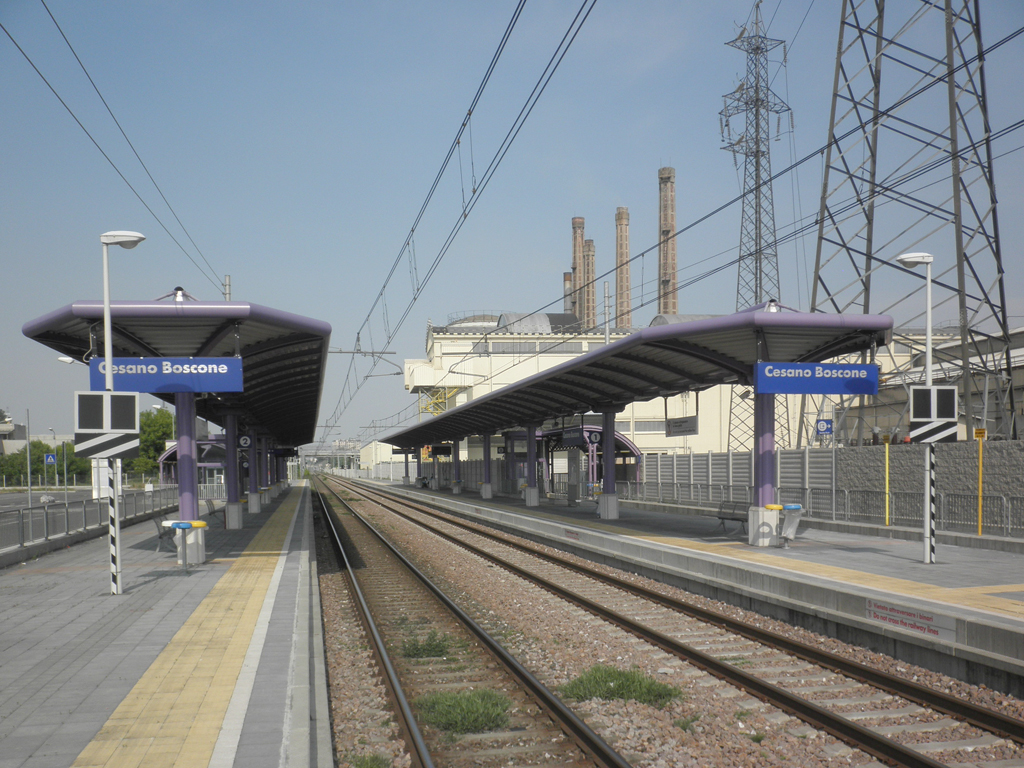

General information
- Location: Cesano Boscone, Milan, Lombardy; Italy
- Coordinates: 45°25′49″N 09°05′29″E
- Operator: Rete Ferroviaria Italiana
- Line: Mortara–Milan
- Distance: 11.900 km (7.394 mi) from Milano Centrale (old)
- Platforms: 2
- Train operators: Trenord

Other information
- Fare zone: STIBM: Mi3
- Classification: Silver

History
- Opened: 7 December 2009; 16 years ago

Services
Preceding station	Trenord	Following station
Trezzano sul Naviglio towards Albairate–Vermezzo	Line S9 (Milan suburban railway service)	Corsico towards Saronno
Location
- Location within Lombardy Location within Northern Italy Location within Italy

Cesano Boscone is a railway station in Italy. Located on the Mortara–Milan railway, it serves the town of Cesano Boscone.

== Services ==
Cesano Boscone is served by line S9 of the Milan suburban railway network, operated by the Lombard railway company Trenord.

== See also ==
- Milan suburban railway network
