= Trezzano sul Naviglio railway station =

Railway station in Italy

Trezzano S.N.
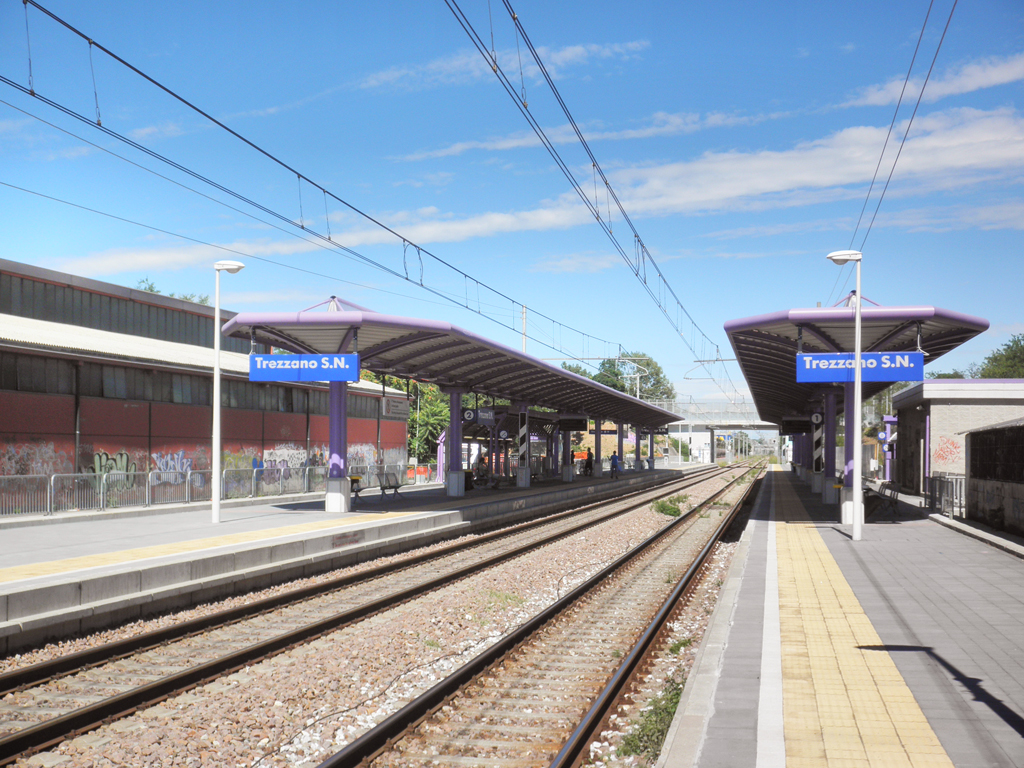

General information
- Location: Via Curiel; Trezzano sul Naviglio, Milan, Lombardy; Italy
- Coordinates: 45°25′14″N 09°04′01″E
- Operator: Rete Ferroviaria Italiana
- Line: Mortara–Milan
- Distance: 14.111 km (8.768 mi) from Milano Centrale (old)
- Platforms: 2
- Train operators: Trenord

Other information
- Fare zone: STIBM: Mi4
- Classification: silver

History
- Opened: 1987; 39 years ago
- Rebuilt: 2009

Services
Preceding station	Trenord	Following station
Gaggiano towards Albairate–Vermezzo	Line S9 (Milan suburban railway service)	Cesano Boscone towards Saronno
Location
- Location within Lombardy Location within Northern Italy Location within Italy

Trezzano sul Naviglio railway station is a railway station in Italy. Located on the Mortara–Milan railway, it serves the town of Trezzano sul Naviglio.

== Services ==
Trezzano sul Naviglio is served by line S9 of the Milan suburban railway service, operated by the Lombard railway company Trenord.

== See also ==
- Milan suburban railway service
