= S19 =

S19 may refer to:

== Aircraft ==
- Letov Š-19, a Czechoslovak airliner
- Rans S-19 Venterra, an American light sport aircraft
- Short S.19 Singapore III, a British flying boat
- SIAI S.19, an Italian racing flying boat
- Sikorsky S-19, an experimental Russian biplane

== Rail and transit ==
- S19 (Rhine-Ruhr S-Bahn), an S-Bahn line in Germany
- S19 (ZVV), a line of the Zürich S-Bahn in Switzerland
- Line S19 (Milan suburban railway service), Italy
- Aioiyama Station, in Midori-ku, Nagoya, Aichi, Japan
- Mizue Station, in Edogawa, Tokyo, Japan
- Niki Station, in Yoichi District, Hokkaido, Japan
- Tsuruhashi Station, in Osaka, Japan

== Roads ==
- S19 Xinnong–Jinshanwei Expressway, China
- Expressway S19 (Poland)
- County Route S19 (California), United States

== Other uses ==
- 40S ribosomal protein S19
- HMS Opossum (S19), a submarine of the Royal Navy
- SREC (file format), an ASCII encoding format for binary data developed by Motorola
- USS S-19 (SS-124), a submarine of the United States Navy
- British NVC community S19, a swamps and tall-herb fen community in the British National Vegetation Classification system
