= Corsico railway station =

Railway station in Italy

Corsico
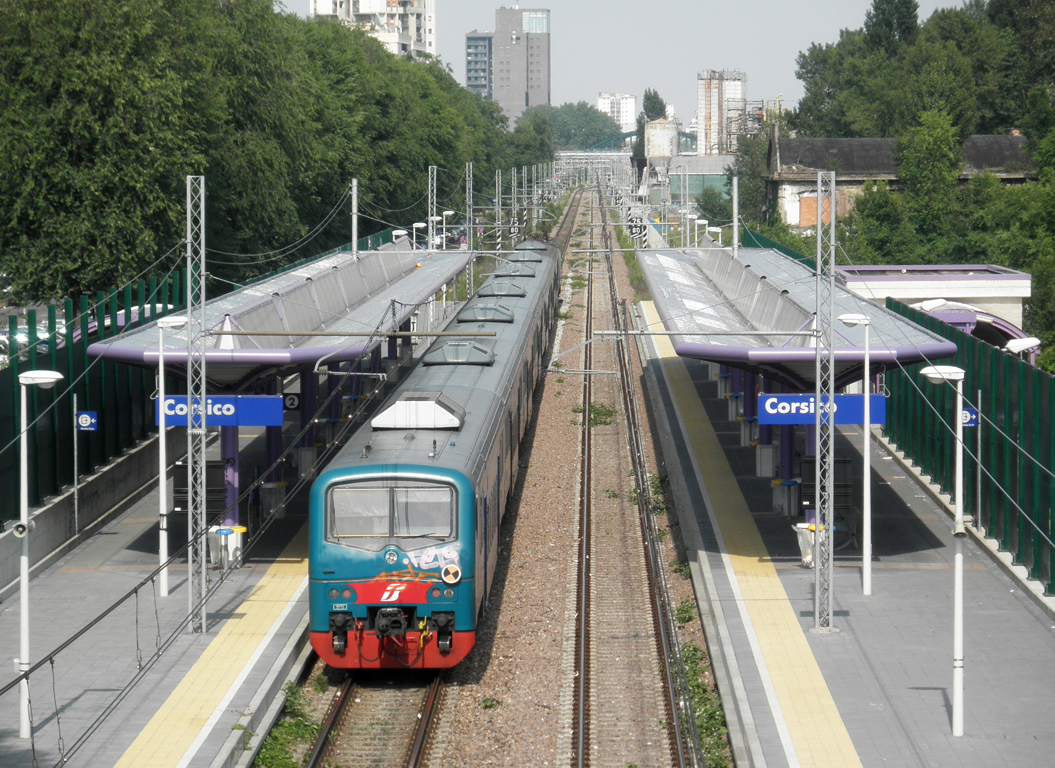

General information
- Location: Via Gramsci; Corsico, Milan, Lombardy; Italy
- Coordinates: 45°26′10″N 09°06′34″E
- Operator: Rete Ferroviaria Italiana
- Line: Mortara–Milan
- Distance: 10.397 km (6.460 mi) from Milano Centrale (old)
- Platforms: 2
- Train operators: Trenord

Other information
- Fare zone: STIBM: Mi3
- Classification: Silver

History
- Opened: 7 December 2009; 16 years ago

Services
Preceding station	Trenord	Following station
Cesano Boscone towards Albairate–Vermezzo	Line S9 (Milan suburban railway service)	Milano San Cristoforo towards Saronno
Location
- Location within Lombardy Location within Northern Italy Location within Italy

Corsico railway station is a railway station in Italy. Located on the Mortara–Milan railway, it serves the town of Corsico.

== Services ==
Corsico is served by line S9 of the Milan suburban railway service, operated by the Lombard railway company Trenord.

== See also ==
- Milan suburban railway service
