= Cormano–Cusano Milanino railway station =

Railway station in Lombardy, Italy

Cormano–Cusano Milanino
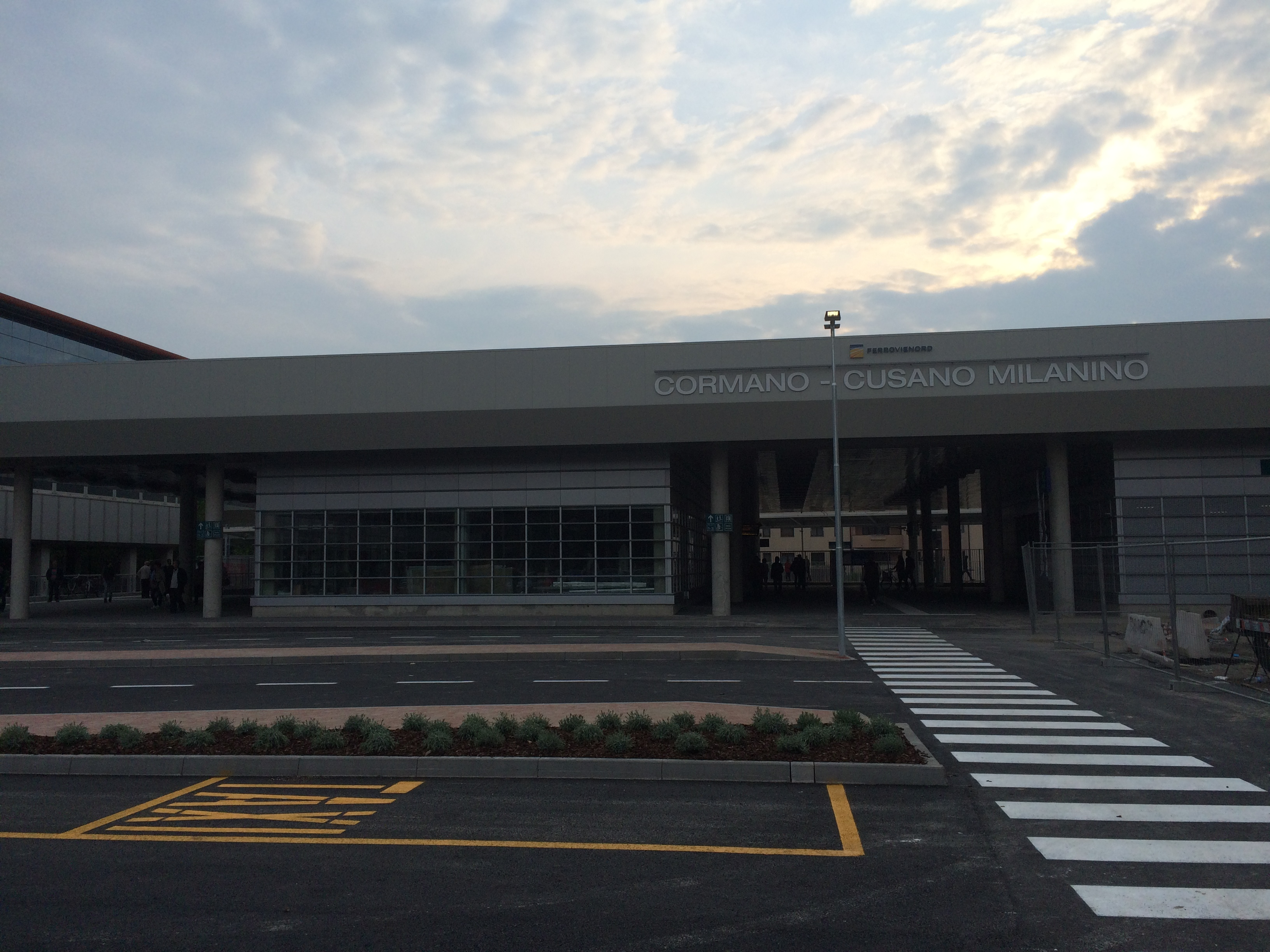

General information
- Location: Cormano & Cusano Milanino, Milan; Italy
- Coordinates: 45°32′43″N 09°10′25″E
- Owner: Ferrovienord
- Operator: Trenord
- Line: Milan–Asso
- Distance: 9.2 km (5.7 mi) from Milan Cadorna
- Platforms: 2
- Tracks: 2

Other information
- Fare zone: STIBM: Mi3

History
- Opened: 26 April 2015; 11 years ago

Services
Preceding station	Trenord	Following station
Paderno Dugnano towards Mariano Comense	Line S2 (Milan suburban railway service)	Milano Bruzzano towards Milano Rogoredo
Paderno Dugnano towards Camnago–Lentate	Line S4 (Milan suburban railway service)	Milano Bruzzano towards Milano Cadorna
Terminus	Line S12 (Milan suburban railway service)	Milano Bruzzano towards Melegnano
Location
- Location within Milan Location within Lombardy Location within Northern Italy Location within Italy

Cormano–Cusano Milanino railway station is a railway station in Italy. It serves the towns of Cormano and Cusano Milanino, being located on the border of these two municipalities.

== History ==
The station replaced and unified the former Cormano–Brusuglio and Cusano Milanino stations, which were closed.

== Services ==
Cormano–Cusano is served by lines S2, S4 and S12 of the Milan suburban railway network, operated by the Lombard railway company Trenord.

== See also ==
- Milan suburban railway network
