= Sant'Agostino (Milan Metro) =

Milan metro station

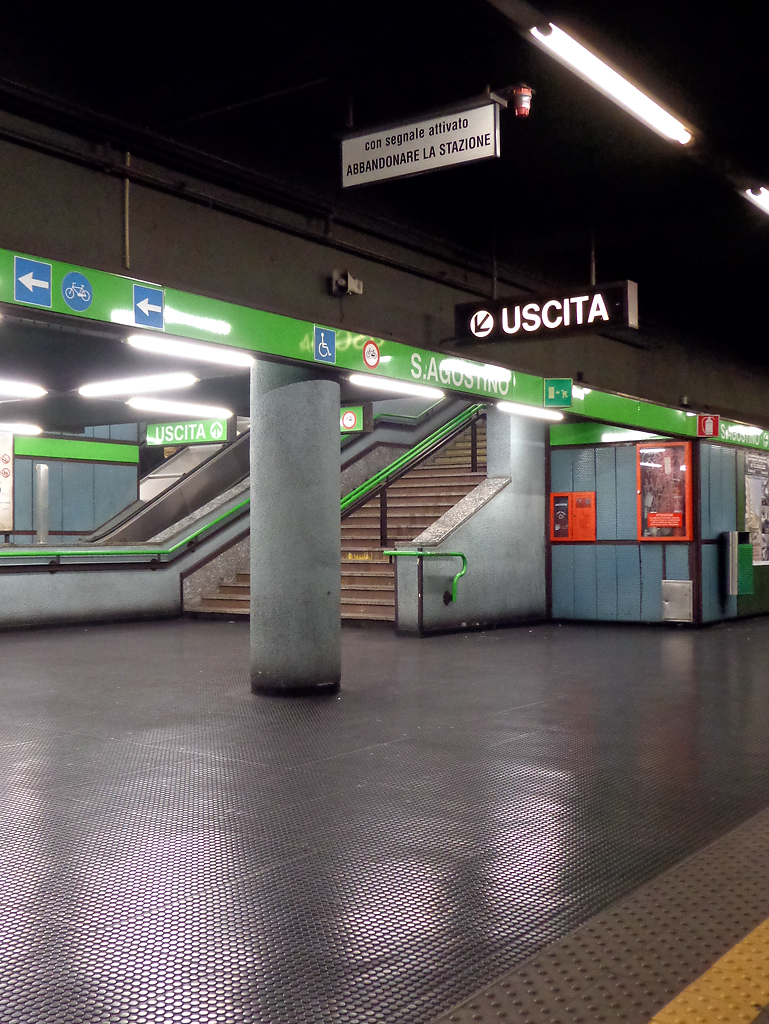

General information
- Location: Piazza Sant'Agostino, Milan
- Coordinates: 45°27′30″N 9°10′11″E
- Owner: Azienda Trasporti Milanesi
- Platforms: 2
- Tracks: 2

Construction
- Structure type: Underground
- Platform levels: 2
- Accessible: yes

Other information
- Fare zone: STIBM: Mi1

History
- Opened: 30 October 1983; 42 years ago

Services
Preceding station	Milan Metro	Following station
Porta Genova towards Assago or Abbiategrasso	Line 2	Sant'Ambrogio towards Cologno Nord or Gessate
Location

Sant'Agostino is an underground station on the Milan Metro Line 2, located under Piazza Sant'Agostino, in Milan's Municipality 1. It was opened on 30 October 1983 as part of the extension of the line from Cadorna to Porta Genova.

The station is the only one on Line 2 with the opposite tracks and platforms built on different levels, the northbound platform being above the southbound one. The same technique was later replicated in the central section of Line 3, from Turati to Crocetta stations.
