= Milano San Cristoforo railway station =

Railway station in Milan, Italy

Milano San Cristoforo
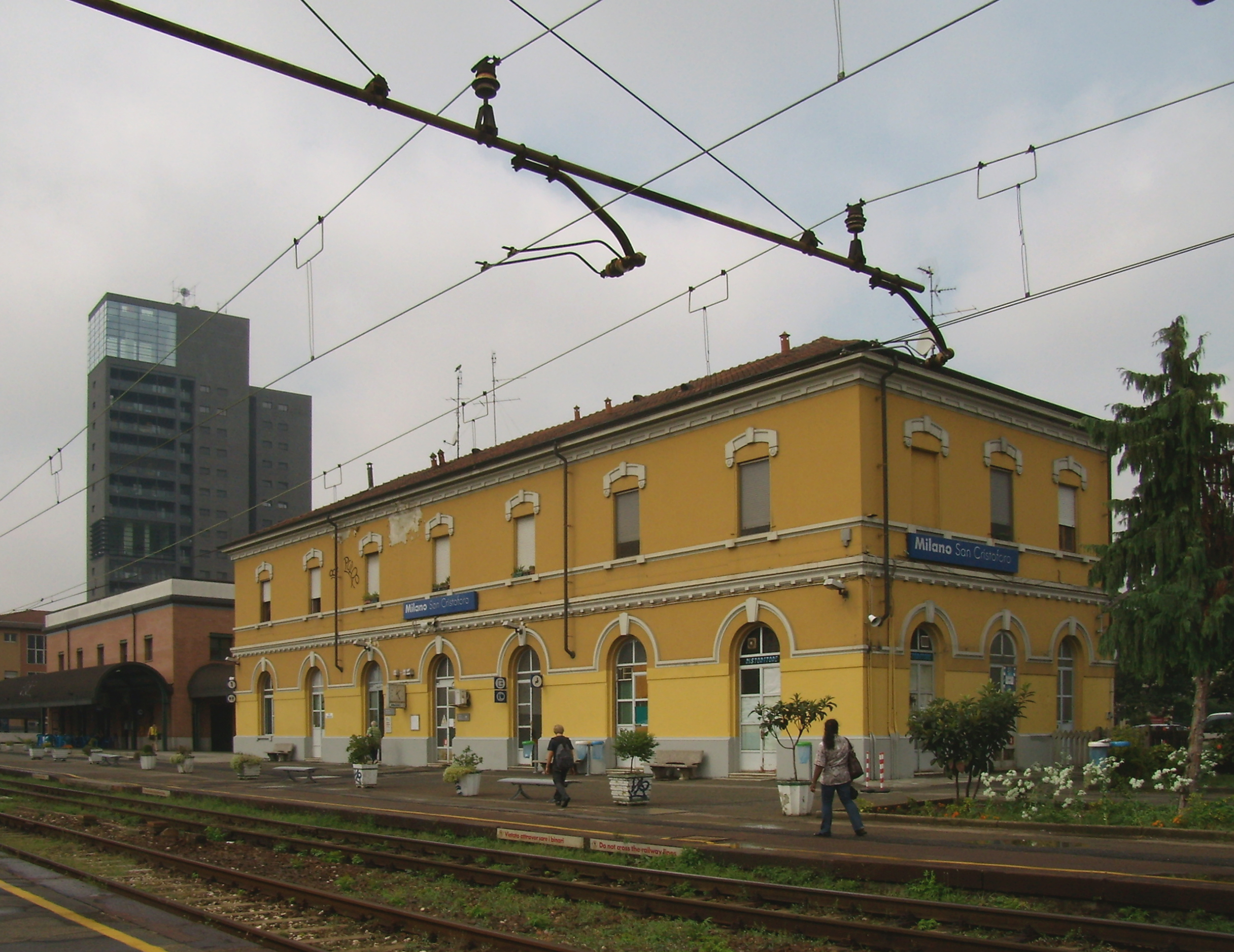

General information
- Location: Piazza Tirana; Milan, Milan, Lombardy; Italy
- Coordinates: 45°26′33″N 09°07′49″E
- Owner: Rete Ferroviaria Italiana
- Lines: Mortara–Milan; Belt railway (Cintura sud)
- Distance: 8.582 km (5.333 mi) from Milano Centrale (old); 9.840 km (6.114 mi) from Milano Rogoredo
- Train operators: Trenord
- Connections: ATM trams; ATM buses

Other information
- Fare zone: STIBM: Mi1
- Classification: Silver

History
- Opened: 1915

Services
Preceding station	Trenord	Following station
Corsico towards Albairate–Vermezzo	Line S9 (Milan suburban railway service)	Milano Romolo towards Saronno
Location
- Location within Milan Location within Lombardy Location within Northern Italy Location within Italy

Milano San Cristoforo is a railway station in Milan, Italy. It is located at Piazza Tirana.

== Services ==
The station is served by line S9 of the Milan suburban railway service, and by regional trains from Milan to Mortara. All these trains are operated by Trenord.

From 12 October 2024 it has become an interchange with the M4 metro line.

== See also ==
- Railway stations in Milan
- Milan suburban railway service
- Milan Metro Line 4
