= Cusano Milanino railway station =

Former railway station in Italy

Cusano Milanino
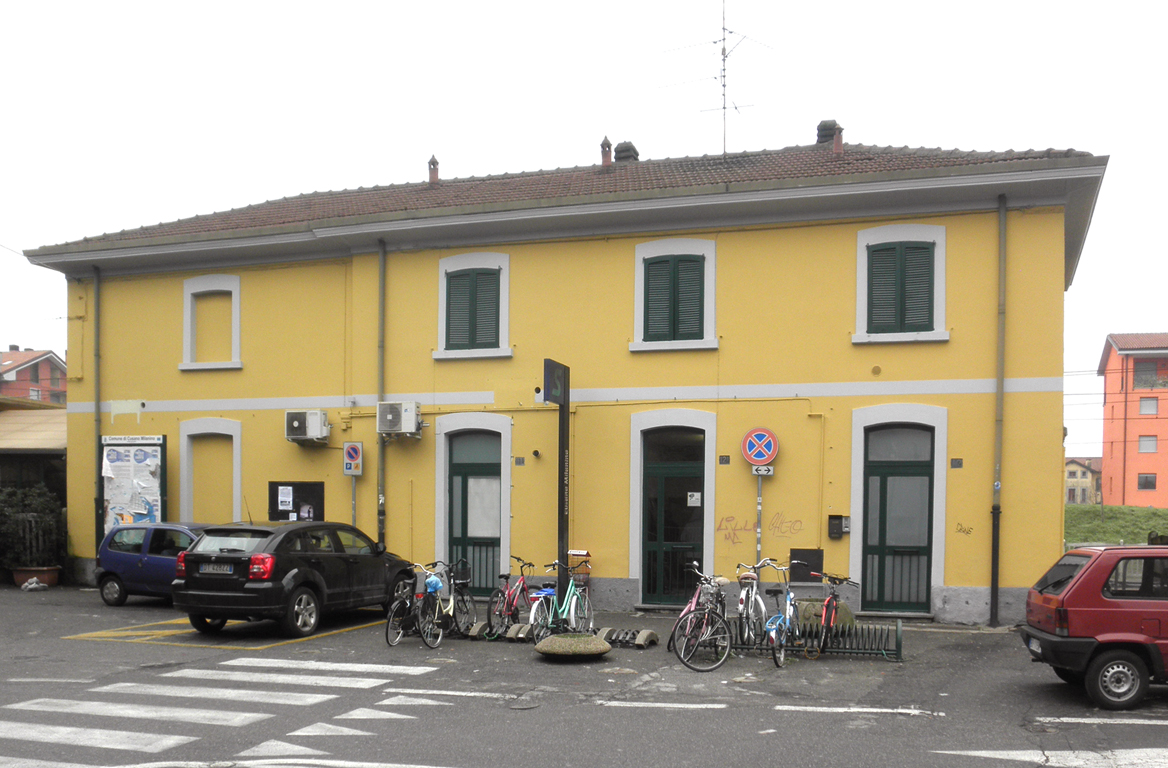

General information
- Location: Via Italia, 12; Cusano Milanino, Milan, Lombardy; Italy
- Coordinates: 45°32′53″N 09°10′26″E
- Operator: Ferrovienord
- Line: Milan–Asso
- Platforms: 2
- Train operators: Trenord

History
- Opened: 16 July 1879; 147 years ago
- Closed: 26 April 2015; 11 years ago
- Electrified: May 1929
Location
- Location within Northern Italy

Cusano Milanino railway station was a railway station in Italy. It served the town of Cusano Milanino.

== Services ==
Cusano Milanino was served by the Milan–Asso railway, operated by the lombard railway company Ferrovie Nord Milano. It was replaced on 26 April 2015 by Cormano-Cusano Milanino railway station.

== See also ==
- Milan–Asso railway
