= Railway stations in Milan =

Previous provision of railway stations throughout the municipality (before Forlanini and Tibaldi construction).

Milan has 24 railway stations in use today. Of these, 18 are managed by RFI, while the remaining 6 are operated by Ferrovienord. Three more stations are currently in the planning stage for the city area: Canottieri, Dergano and Zama.

== History of rail transport in Milan ==
In the huge explosion of rail transport in the 19th century, Milan was one of the places that invested in the development of this type of transport.

In the late 1830s, Emperor Ferdinand I of Austria granted "the privilege to build a road on iron rails from Milan to Monza" to the Holzhammer company of Bolzano. The privilege authorized the construction of a railway project developed by the Milanese engineer Giulio Sarti.

The Milan–Monza railway, opened in 1840, was the first railway line in Lombardy, and the second in Italy after the Naples–Portici railway. Milan's first railway station, Porta Nuova, formed part of the new railway. It was placed outside the circle of ramparts, near the Porta Nuova city gate, from which it took its name.

In February 1846 came the second Milanese railway station, Porta Tosa-Vittoria, near the city gate of the same name, and outside the circle of ramparts. For eleven years, this station served as the terminus of the Milan–Treviglio railway, which is the Lombard section of the Milan-Venice railway. Since 1857, with the opening of the Treviglio–Bergamo–Coccaglio railway, Porta Tosa station became the western terminus of the railway linking Milan with Venice, the other capital city of the then Kingdom of Lombardy–Venetia.

With the decision to extend the Monza railway further north to Como, it was necessary to widen the Porta Nuova railway station by adding extra space, along the banks of the Naviglio Martesana. The new larger station, with a sizeable three bay train hall covering the tracks and trains, entered service in 1850. Today, the station building of this now former station, which was closed in 1931, can still be recognized inside the barracks of the Guardia di Finanza, in via Melchiorre Gioia.

== Chronological list of stations ==
Name	Inauguration	Current state	Type	Manager
Porta Nuova (I)	1840	Sold	Terminal station, surface	N/A
Porta Tosa	1846	Demolished	Terminal station, surface	N/A
Porta Nuova (II)	1850	Sold	Terminal station, surface	N/A
Certosa	1858	In use	Through station, surface	RFI
Centrale (old)	1864	Demolished	Through station, surface	N/A
Porta Genova	1870	In use	Terminal station, surface	RFI
S.M. Garibaldi	1873	Sold	Goods yard	N/A
Cadorna	1879	In use	Terminal station, surface	FERROVIENORD
Bruzzano	1879	In use	Through station, surface	FERROVIENORD
Affori	1879	In use	Through station, surface	FERROVIENORD
Bovisa	1879	In use	Through station, surface	FERROVIENORD
S.M. Sempione	1883	Sold	Goods yard	N/A
Rogoredo	1891	In use	Through station, surface	RFI/Centostazioni
Porta Romana (freight)	1891	In use	Goods yard, through station, surface	RFI
Lambrate (old)	1896	Sold	Through station, surface	N/A
Porta Vittoria	1911	In use	Through station, underground	RFI
Greco Pirelli	1914	In use	Through station, surface	RFI
San Cristoforo	1915	In use	Through station, surface	RFI
Porta Romana (passenger)	1918	In use	Through station, surface	RFI
Bullona	1929	Sold	Through station, surface	FERROVIENORD
Bovisa FS	19??	Sold	Through station, surface	N/A
Centrale	1931	In use	Terminal station, surface	RFI/Grandi Stazioni
Lambrate	1931	In use	Through station, surface	RFI
Porta Nuova (III)	1931	Sold	Terminal station, surface	FS
Quarto Oggiaro	195?	In use	Through station, surface	FERROVIENORD
Porta Garibaldi	1963	In use	Terminal and through station, surface and underground	RFI/Centostazioni
Repubblica	1997	In use	Through station, underground	RFI
Porta Venezia	1997	In use	Through station, underground	RFI
Lancetti	1997	In use	Through station, underground	RFI
Dateo	2002	In use	Through station, underground	RFI
Villapizzone	2002	In use	Through station, surface	RFI
Domodossola	2003	In use	Through station, underground	FERROVIENORD
Romolo	2006	In use	Through station, surface	RFI
Forlanini	2015	In use	Through station, surface	RFI
Tibaldi	2022	In use	Through station, surface	RFI

== See also ==
- List of Milan suburban railway stations
- History of rail transport in Italy
- Rail transport in Italy
- Railway stations in Italy
