= Milano Romolo railway station =

Railway station in Milan, Italy

Milano Romolo
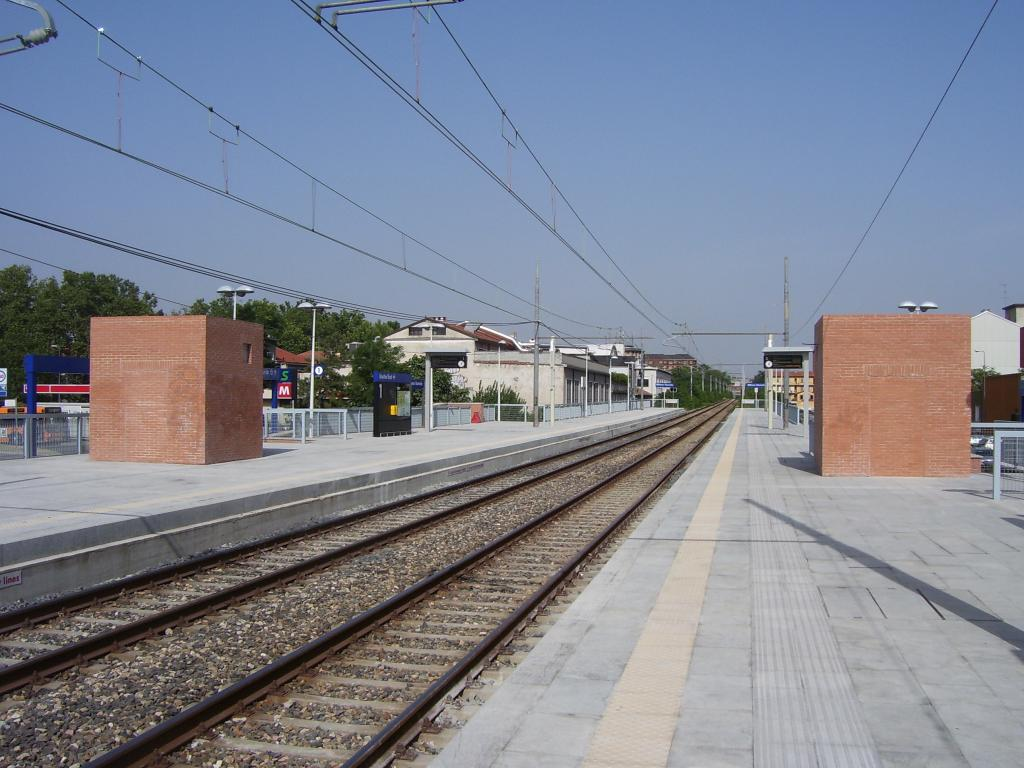

General information
- Location: Piazza Alberto Ascari, Milan; Italy
- Coordinates: 45°26′35″N 09°10′03″E
- Owner: Rete Ferroviaria Italiana
- Operator: Trenord
- Line: Cintura sud
- Distance: 6.630 km (4.120 mi) from Milano Rogoredo
- Platforms: 2
- Connections: Romolo (Milan Metro)

Other information
- Fare zone: STIBM: Mi1

History
- Opened: 19 June 2006

Services
| Preceding station | Trenord | Following station |
|---|---|---|
| Milano San Cristoforo towards Albairate–Vermezzo | Line S9 (Milan suburban railway service) | Milano Tibaldi towards Saronno |
Location
- Location within Milan Location within Lombardy Location within Northern Italy Location within Italy

Milano Romolo is a railway station in Milan, Italy. It is located at Piazza Alberto Ascari, near Viale Romolo.

== Services ==
Milano Romolo is served by line S9 of the Milan suburban railway service, operated by Trenord.

== See also ==
- Railway stations in Milan
- Milan suburban railway service
