= Milano Tibaldi railway station =

Railway station in Milan, Italy

Milano Tibaldi
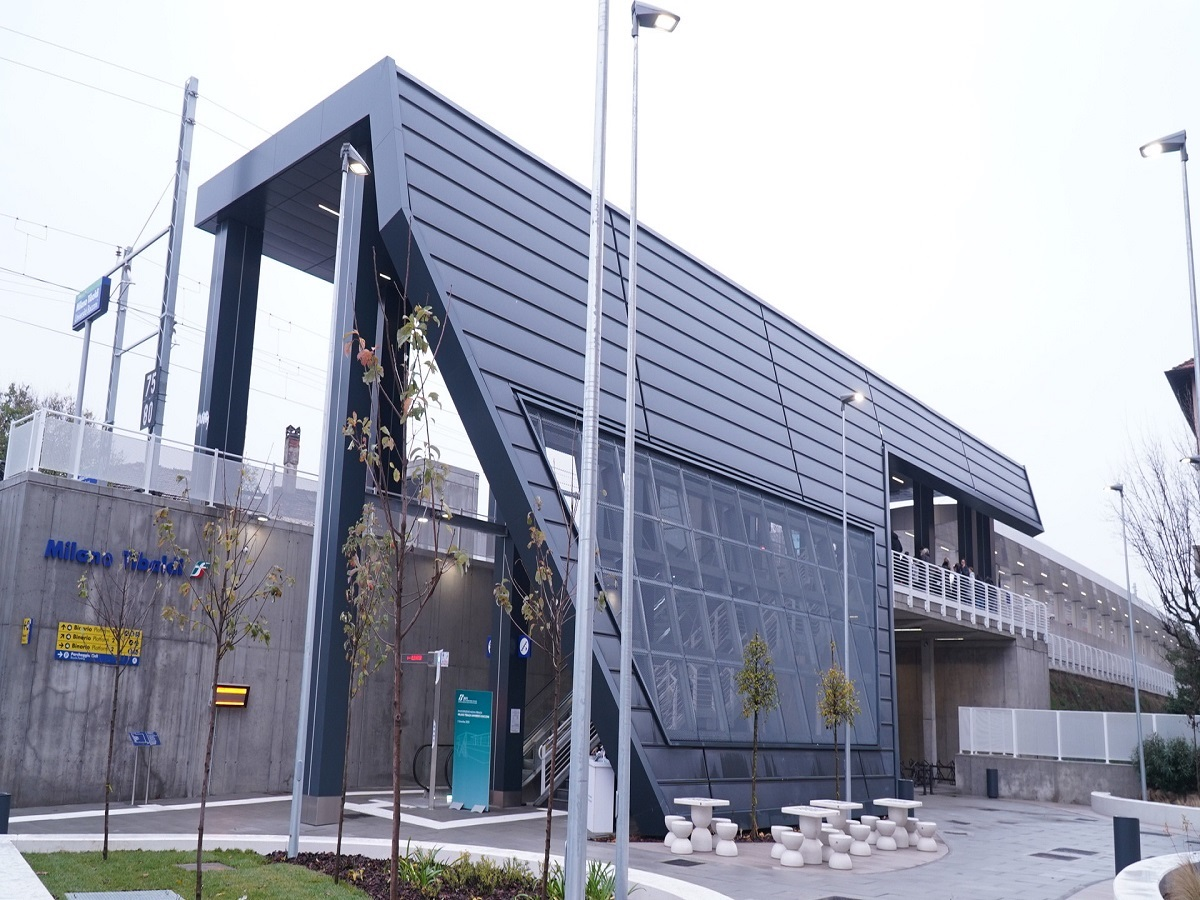

General information
- Location: Milan; Italy
- Coordinates: 45°26′37.3″N 09°11′02.7″E
- Owner: Rete Ferroviaria Italiana
- Operator: Trenord
- Line: Cintura sud
- Distance: 1.421 km (0.883 mi) from Milano Romolo
- Platforms: 2
- Connections: Tram and buses

Other information
- Fare zone: STIBM: Mi1

History
- Opened: 11 December 2022

Services
Preceding station	Trenord	Following station
Milano Romolo towards Albairate–Vermezzo	Line S9 (Milan suburban railway service)	Milano Porta Romana towards Saronno
Location
- Location within Milan Location within Lombardy Location within Northern Italy Location within Italy

Milano Tibaldi is a railway station in Milan, Italy.

The Milano Tibaldi station, together with the Porta Romana station, is part of the Milan Circle Line project, the new surface metro of Milan, modeled on the London Underground called the Circle Line.

== Services ==
Milano Tibaldi is served by line S9 of the Milan suburban railway service, operated by Trenord.

== See also ==
- Railway stations in Milan
- Milan suburban railway service
