= Lanza (Milan Metro) =

Metro railway station in Milan, Italy

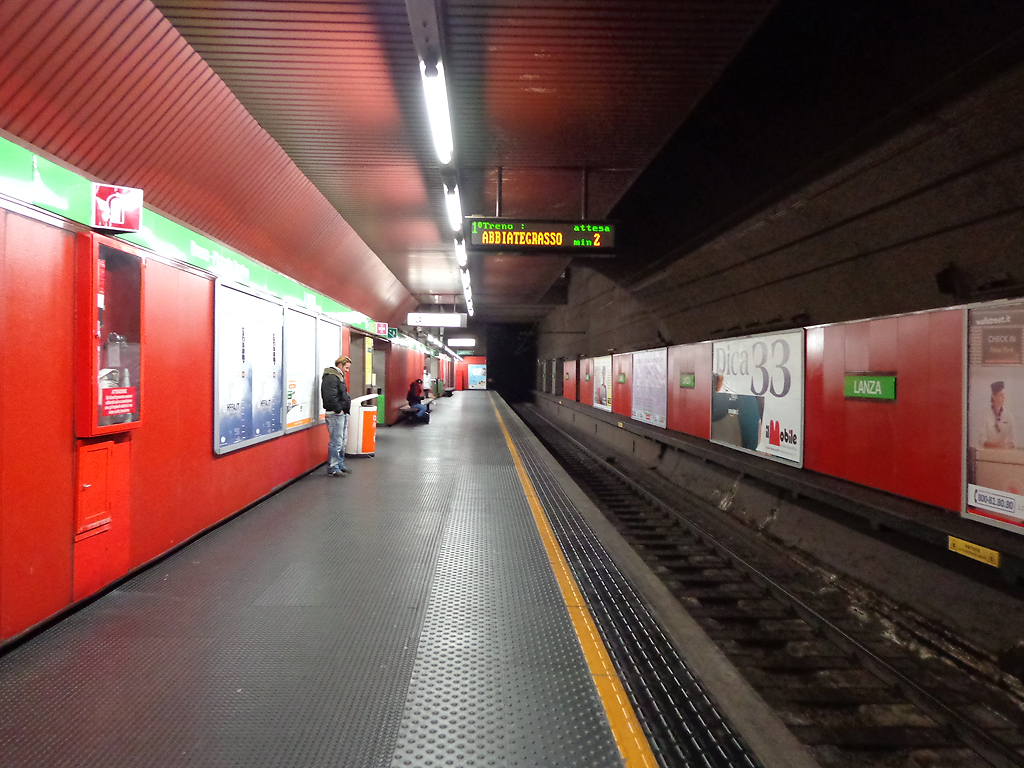

General information
- Location: Via Giovanni Lanza, Milan
- Coordinates: 45°28′19″N 9°10′55″E
- Owner: Azienda Trasporti Milanesi
- Platforms: 2
- Tracks: 2

Construction
- Structure type: Underground

Other information
- Fare zone: STIBM: Mi1

History
- Opened: 3 March 1978; 48 years ago

Services
Preceding station	Milan Metro	Following station
Cadorna towards Assago or Abbiategrasso	Line 2	Moscova towards Cologno Nord or Gessate
Location

Lanza is an underground station on Line 2 of the Milan Metro. The station was opened on 3 March 1978 as part of the extension from Garibaldi FS to Cadorna.

The station is located on Via Giovanni Lanza, within the core area of the city centre of Milan, in the vicinity of the Sforzesco Castle. The station allows riders to reach the Brera district, the Piccolo Teatro di Milano, the Parco Sempione and the city aquarium.

Lanza is the only station in the center to have an input on the front surface of a building. It is also the only stop on Line 2 to have the platforms parallel to each other on the same level, but in two different tunnels without the use of a central platform.

According to a sign indicating the distance between stations, Moscova station is 550 meters away.
