= Gaggiano railway station =

Railway station in Italy

Gaggiano
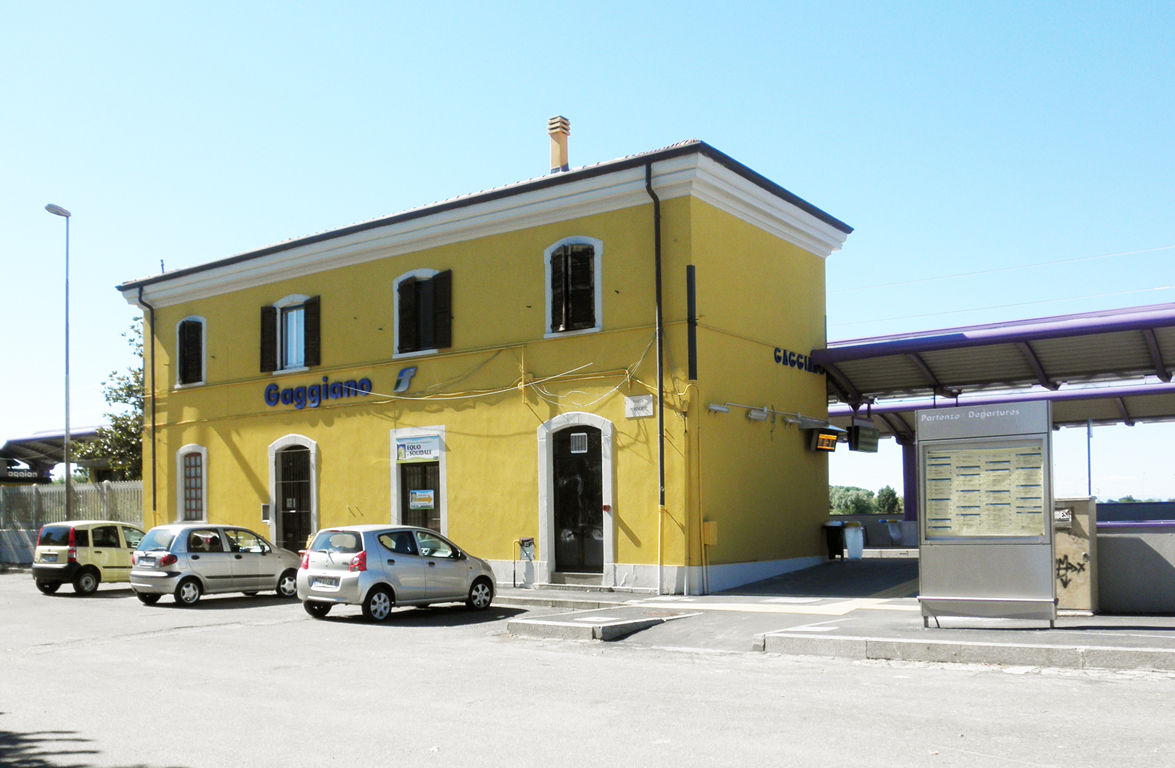

General information
- Location: Piazza IV Novembre; Gaggiano, Milan, Lombardy; Italy
- Coordinates: 45°24′31″N 09°01′52″E
- Operator: Rete Ferroviaria Italiana
- Line: Mortara–Milan
- Distance: 17.217 km (10.698 mi) from Milano Centrale (old)
- Platforms: 2
- Train operators: Trenord

Other information
- Fare zone: STIBM: Mi5
- Classification: Silver

History
- Opened: 17 January 1870; 156 years ago

Services
Preceding station	Trenord	Following station
Albairate–Vermezzo Terminus	Line S9 (Milan suburban railway service)	Trezzano sul Naviglio towards Saronno
Location
- Location within Lombardy Location within Northern Italy Location within Italy

Gaggiano railway station is a railway station in Italy. Located on the Mortara–Milan railway, it serves the municipality of Gaggiano.

== Services ==
Gaggiano is served by line S9 of the Milan suburban railway service, operated by the Lombard railway company Trenord.

== See also ==
- Milan suburban railway service
