= Milano Scalo Romana railway station =

Railway station in Italy

Milano Scalo Romana
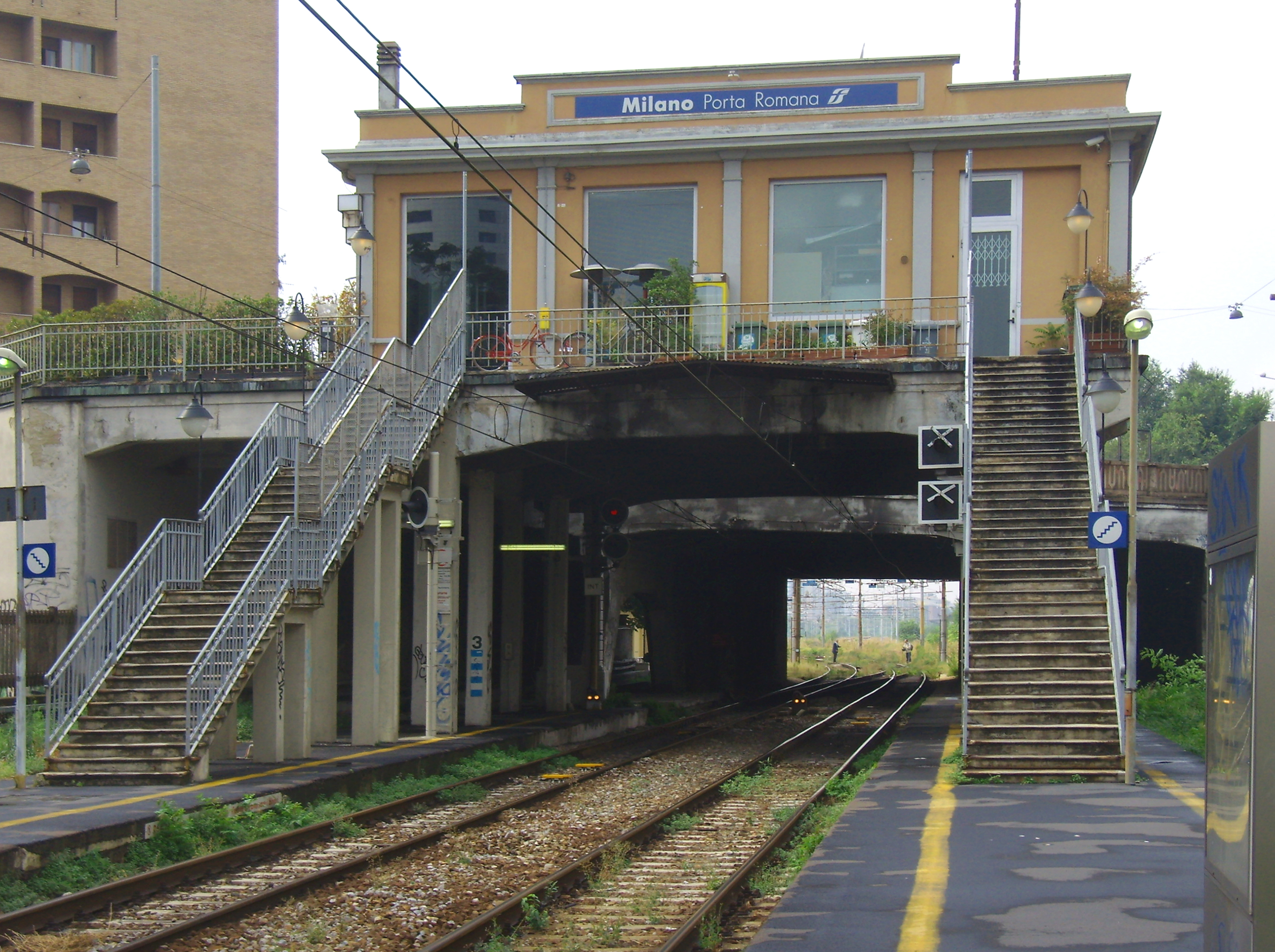

General information
- Location: Corso Lodi 51; Milan; Italy
- Coordinates: 45°26′45″N 09°12′30″E
- Owner: Rete Ferroviaria Italiana
- Operator: Trenord
- Line: Cintura sud
- Platforms: 2
- Tracks: 2
- Connections: Lodi (M3)

Other information
- Fare zone: STIBM: Mi1
- Classification: Silver

History
- Opened: 1931
- Electrified: 1931

Services
Preceding station	Trenord	Following station
Milano Tibaldi towards Albairate–Vermezzo	Line S9 (Milan suburban railway service)	Milano Forlanini towards Saronno
Location
- Location within Milan

Milano Scalo Romana is a railway station in Milan, Italy.

The Porta Romana station, together with the Milano Tibaldi Station-Bocconi University, is part of the Milan Circle Line project, the new surface metro of Milan, modeled on the London Underground Circle Line.

Map of the Milan Circle Line

== Services ==
Milano Scalo Romana is served by line S9 of the Milan suburban railway service, operated by Trenord. Until December 2025, the station was known as Milano Porta Romana.

== See also ==
- Railway stations in Milan
- Milan suburban railway service
