= Moscova (Milan Metro) =

Milan metro station

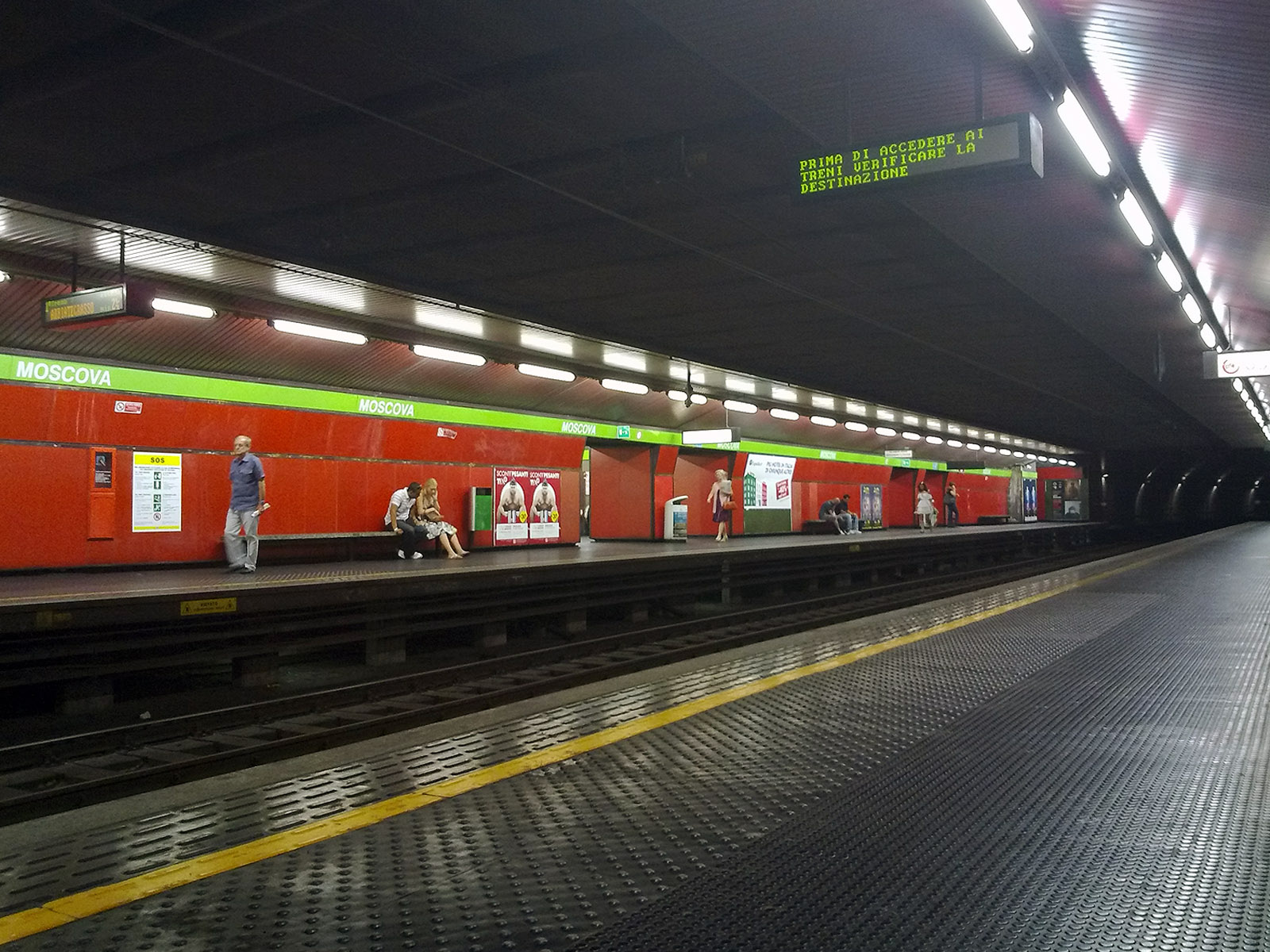

General information
- Location: Via della Moscova, Milan
- Coordinates: 45°28′40″N 9°11′04″E
- Owner: Azienda Trasporti Milanesi
- Platforms: 2
- Tracks: 2

Construction
- Structure type: Underground

Other information
- Fare zone: STIBM: Mi1

History
- Opened: 3 March 1978; 48 years ago

Services
Preceding station	Milan Metro	Following station
Lanza towards Assago or Abbiategrasso	Line 2	Garibaldi FS towards Cologno Nord or Gessate
Location

Moscova is an underground station on Line 2 of the Milan Metro, in Italy. The station was opened on 3 March 1978 as part of the extension from Garibaldi FS to Cadorna. The distance from the Lanza station is 550 meters.

The station is located on Via della Moscova, near Largo La Foppa, within the city centre of Milan. It allows riders to quickly reach the Parco Sempione and the Arena Civica.
