= Milano Porta Genova railway station =

Former Railway station in Milan, Italy

Milano Porta Genova
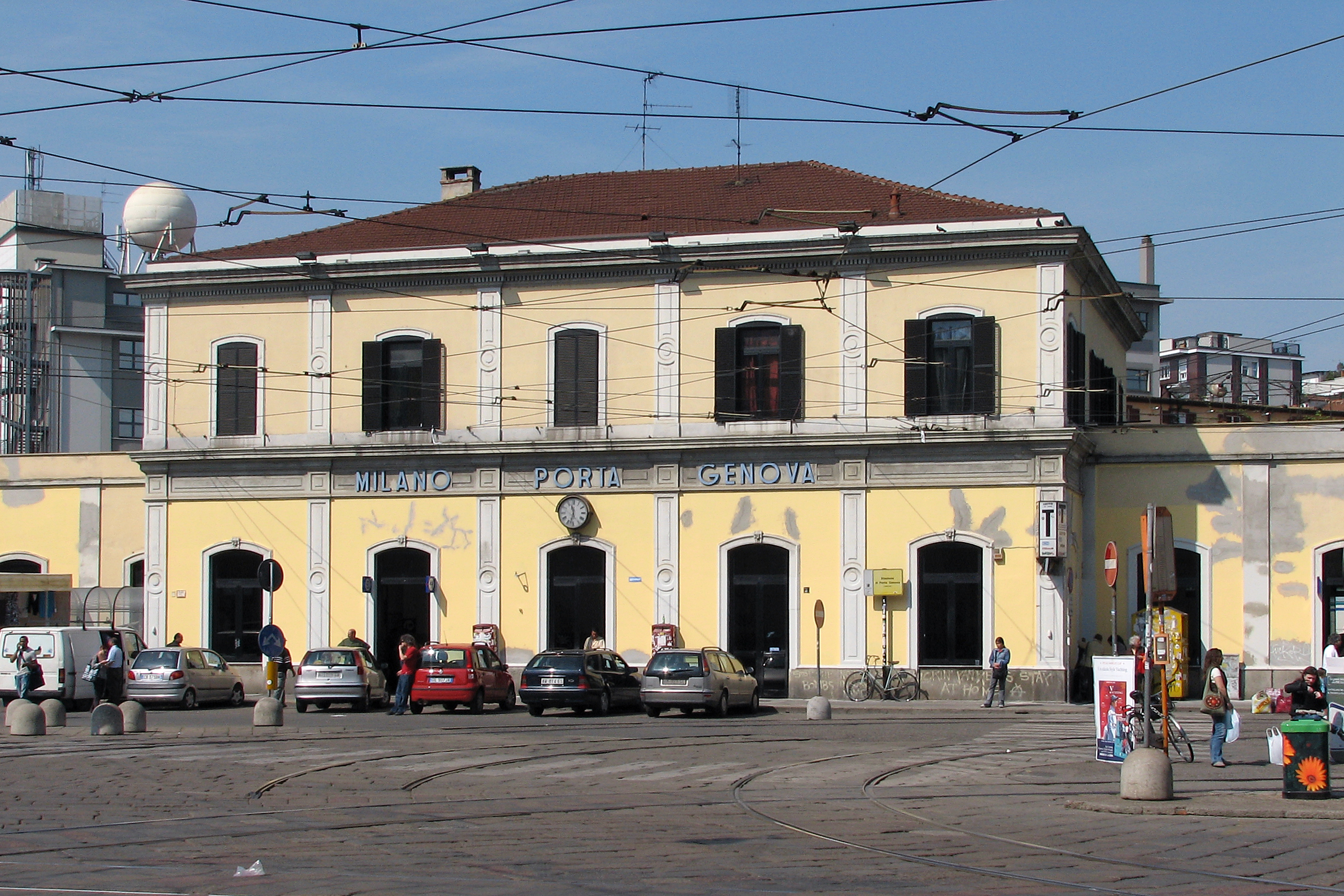

General information
- Location: Piazzale P. Genova 4, Milan; Italy
- Coordinates: 45°27′12″N 09°10′10″E
- Owner: Rete Ferroviaria Italiana
- Operator: Trenord
- Line: Mortara–Milan
- Distance: 5.206 km (3.235 mi) from Milano Centrale (old)
- Connections: Porta Genova (Milan Metro)

History
- Opened: 17 January 1870
- Closed: 13 December 2025
Location
- Location within Milan Location within Lombardy Location within Northern Italy Location within Italy

Milano Porta Genova was a railway station in Milan, Italy. On 13 December 2025, it closed.

== Services ==
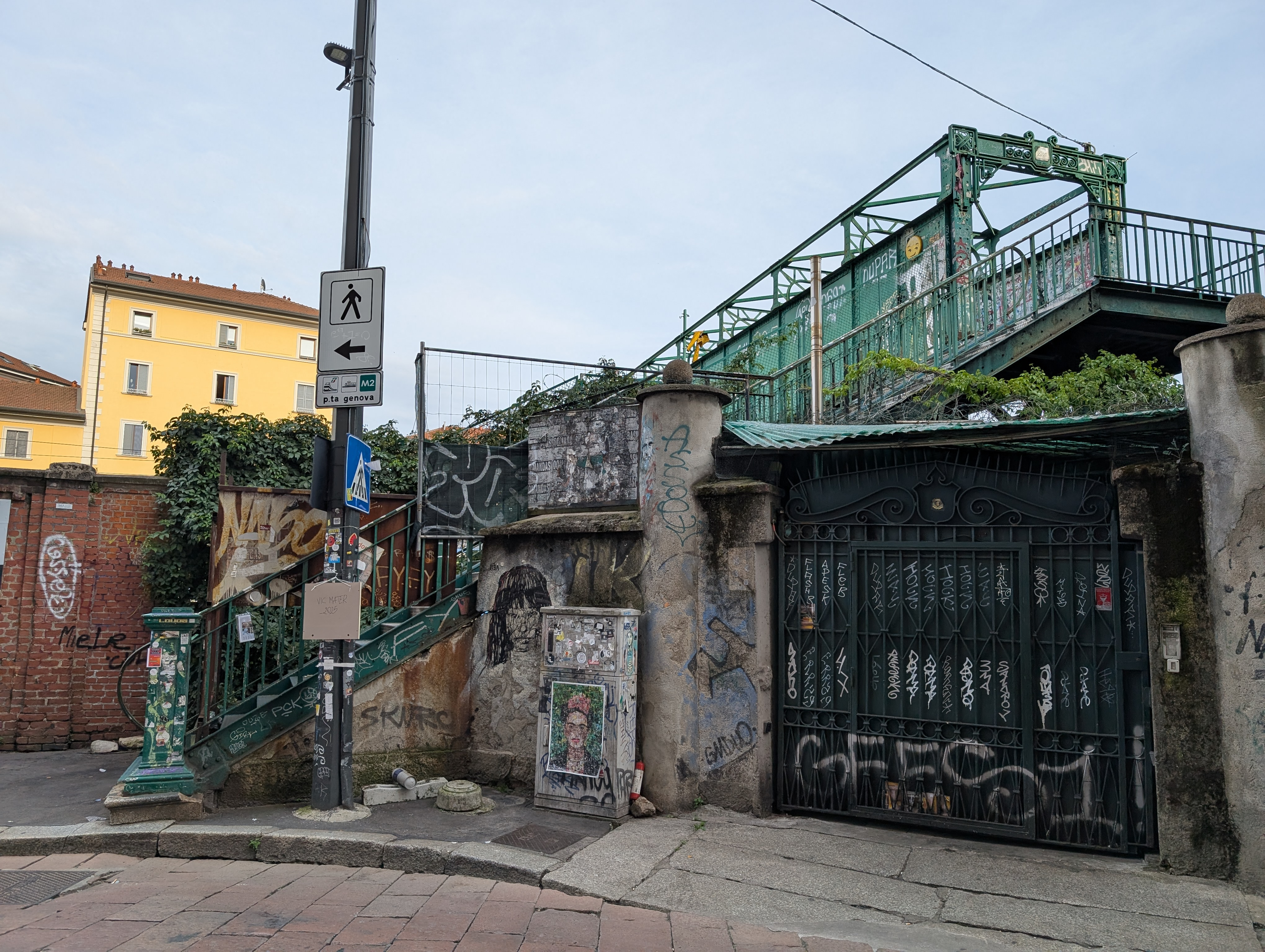
Closed footbridge over abandoned railway at the disused Milano Porta Genova railway station in June 2026 (image by Philip Mallis)

Milano Porta Genova was, starting in 1870, the terminus of the regional trains to Mortara, operated by the Lombard railway company Trenord.

== See also ==
- Railway stations in Milan
