= Costa Masnaga railway station =

Railway station in Lombardy, Italy

Costa Masnaga
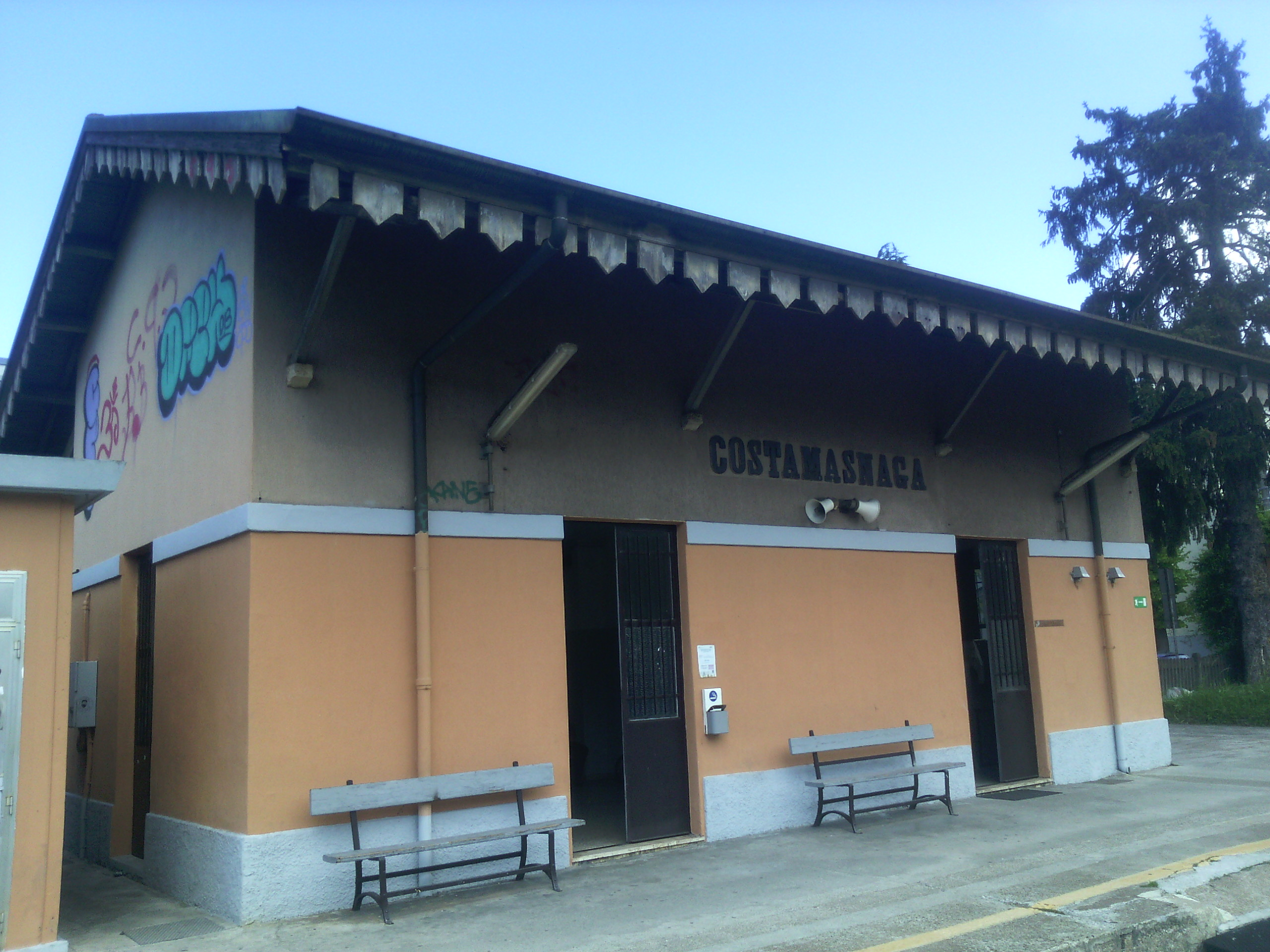

General information
- Location: Costa Masnaga, Lecco, Lombardy; Italy
- Coordinates: 45°45′48″N 09°17′05″E
- Operator: Rete Ferroviaria Italiana
- Line: Monza–Molteno
- Distance: 26.528 km (16.484 mi) from Monza
- Platforms: 1
- Tracks: 1
- Train operators: Trenord

Other information
- Classification: bronze

Services
Preceding station	Trenord	Following station
Cassago–Nibionno–Bulciago towards Milano Porta Garibaldi	Line S7 (Milan suburban railway service)	Molteno towards Lecco
Location
- Location within Lombardy Location within Northern Italy Location within Italy

Costa Masnaga railway station is a railway station in Italy. Located on the Monza–Molteno railway, it serves the municipality of Costa Masnaga in Lombardy. The train services are operated by Trenord.

== Train services ==
The station is served by the following service(s):

- Milan Metropolitan services (S7) Milan – Molteno – Lecco

== See also ==
- Milan suburban railway network
