= United Left for Cusano Milanino =

Electoral alliance in Cusano Milanino, Italy

United Left for Cusano Milanino Sinistra Unita per Cusano Milanino
- Abbreviation: SUCM
- Founded: 2004
- Headquarters: Cusano Milanino
- Ideology: Communism; Regionalism
- National affiliation: PRC

United Left for Cusano Milanino (in Italian: Sinistra Unita per Cusano Milanino) is an electoral alliance, including the local branch of Communist Refoundation Party, in the municipality of Cusano Milanino, Italy.

In the 2004 municipal elections, the list of Sinistra Unita got 779 votes (7.79%). In the municipal council the group is represented by Giorgio Bolognesi. The group currently takes part in the municipal government, represented by Paola Rampellini and Gianluca Santi.
