= Solaro, Lombardy =

Solaro Soree (Lombard)
- Comune
- Comune di Solaro
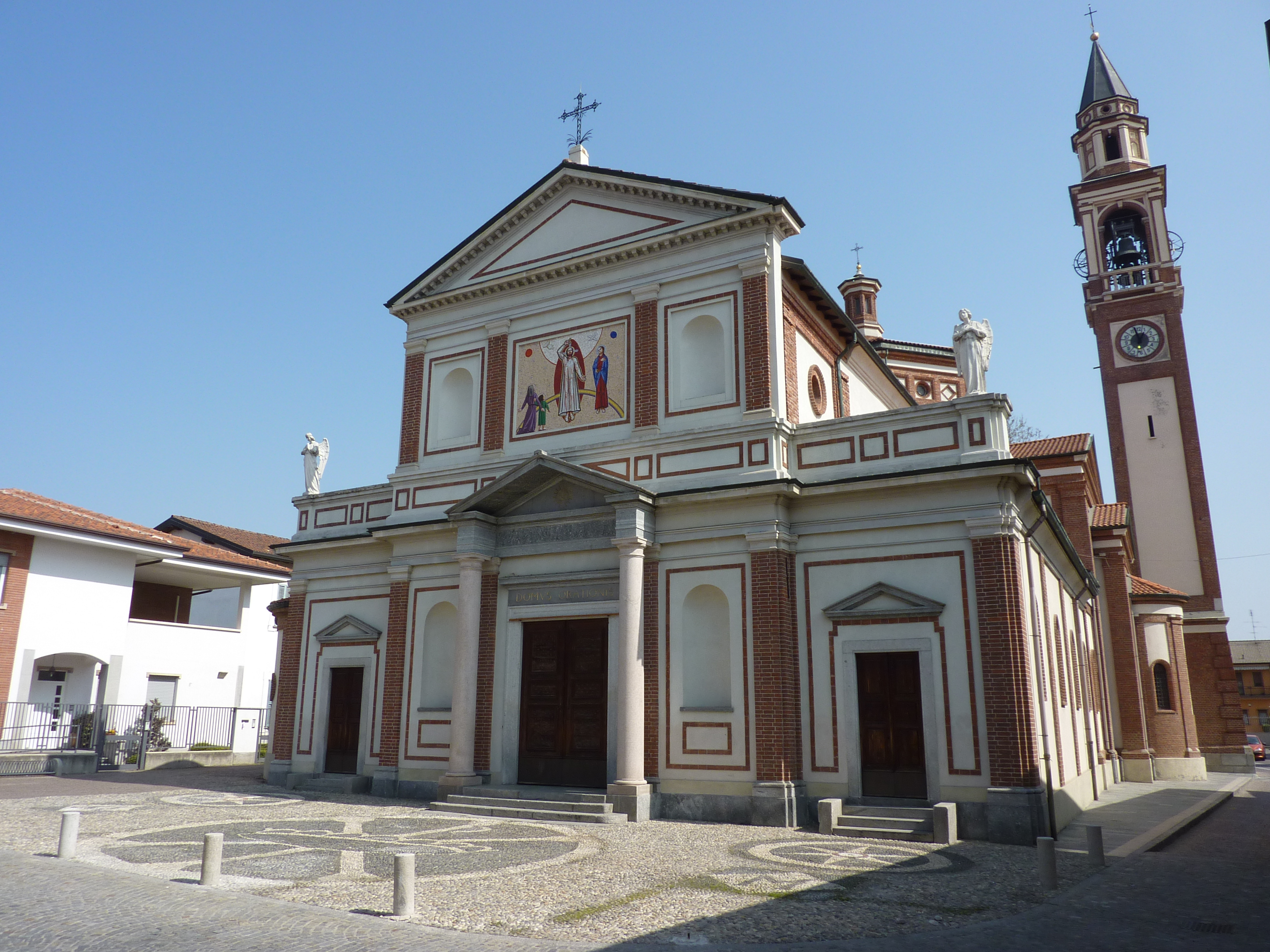
- Parish church

- Location within Italy Location within Lombardy
- Coordinates: 45°36′N 9°5′E
- Country: Italy
- Region: Lombardy
- Metropolitan city: Milan (MI)

Government
  - Mayor: Nilde Moretti

Area
  - Total: 6.7 km^{2} (2.6 sq mi)
- Elevation: 211 m (692 ft)

Population (31 December 2010)
  - Total: 14,203
  - Density: 2,100/km^{2} (5,500/sq mi)
- Demonym: Solaresi
- Time zone: UTC+1 (CET)
  - Summer (DST): UTC+2 (CEST)
- Postal code: 20020
- Dialing code: 02
- Website: Official website

Solaro (Italian: [soˈlaːro]; Milanese: Soree [suˈreː]) is a comune (municipality) in the Metropolitan City of Milan in the Italian region Lombardy, located about 15 kilometres (9 mi) northwest of Milan. It has a population of about 14.000.

Solaro borders the following municipalities: Saronno, Ceriano Laghetto, Bovisio-Masciago, Limbiate, Caronno Pertusella, Cesate.

== Economics ==
There is an Electrolux production site in Solaro
