= Cormano =

Cormano Cormàn (Lombard)
- Comune
- Comune di Cormano
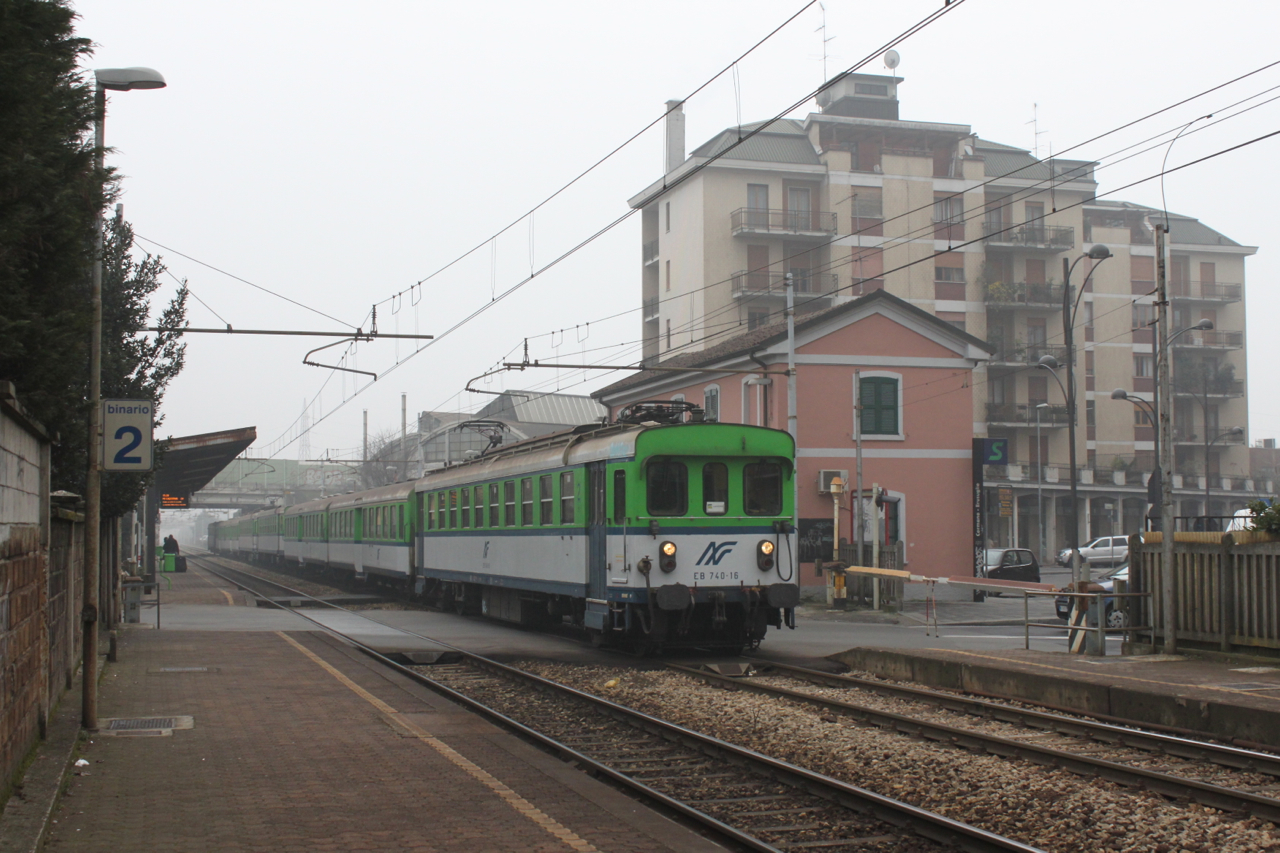

- Coat of arms

- Location within Italy Location within Lombardy
- Coordinates: 45°33′N 9°10′E
- Country: Italy
- Region: Lombardy
- Metropolitan city: Milan (MI)
- Frazioni: Brusuglio, Fornasè, Molinazzo, Ospitaletto

Government
  - Mayor: Luigi Gianantonio Magistro

Area
  - Total: 4.47 km^{2} (1.73 sq mi)
- Elevation: 149 m (489 ft)

Population (30 November 2017)
  - Total: 20,031
  - Density: 4,480/km^{2} (11,600/sq mi)
- Demonym: Cormanesi
- Time zone: UTC+1 (CET)
  - Summer (DST): UTC+2 (CEST)
- Postal code: 20032
- Dialing code: 02
- Website: Official website

Cormano (Milanese: Cormàn [kurˈmãː]) is a comune (municipality) in the Metropolitan City of Milan in the Italian region Lombardy, located about 9 kilometres (6 mi) north of Milan.

Cormano borders the following municipalities: Paderno Dugnano, Bollate, Cusano Milanino, Bresso, Novate Milanese, Milan.

It was previously served by the Cormano-Cusano Milanino railway station, which was closed in 2015, and replaced by the Cormano-Cusano Milanino railway station.
