= Ceriano Laghetto =

Ceriano Laghetto Cerian (Lombard)
- Comune
- Comune di Ceriano Laghetto
- Coat of arms

- Location within Italy Location within Lombardy
- Coordinates: 45°38′N 9°5′E
- Country: Italy
- Region: Lombardy
- Province: Monza and Brianza (MB)
- Frazioni: Dal Pozzo, Villaggio Brollo

Government
  - Mayor: Massimiliano Occa (civic list)

Area
  - Total: 7.08 km^{2} (2.73 sq mi)
- Elevation: 216 m (709 ft)

Population (31 October 2026)
  - Total: 6,713
  - Density: 948/km^{2} (2,460/sq mi)
- Demonym(s): Cerianesi (Italian); Cerianes (Lombard)
- Time zone: UTC+1 (CET)
  - Summer (DST): UTC+2 (CEST)
- Postal code: 20816
- Dialing code: 02
- Patron saint: Victor the Moor
- Saint day: May 8
- Website: Official website

Ceriano Laghetto (Italian: [tʃeˈrjaːno laˈɡetto]; Brianzoeu: Cerian [tʃeˈrjãː]) is a comune (municipality) in the Province of Monza and Brianza in the Italian region Lombardy, located about 20 kilometres (12 mi) northwest of Milan.

It is served by two railway stations: Ceriano Laghetto-Solaro and Ceriano Laghetto-Groane.
