= Porta Genova (Milan Metro) =

Milan metro station

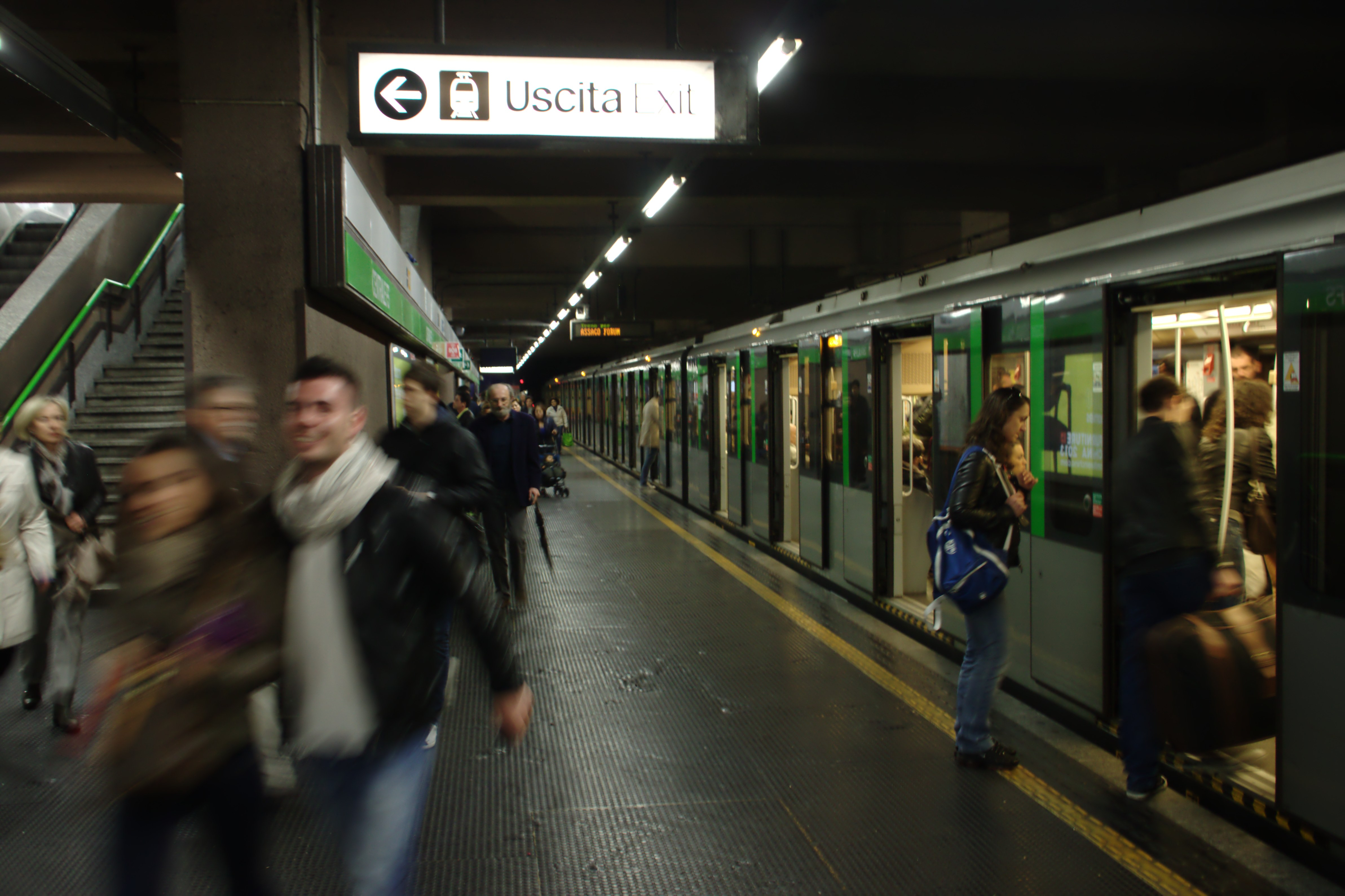

General information
- Location: Milan; Italy
- Coordinates: 45°27′08″N 9°10′12″E
- Owner: Azienda Trasporti Milanesi
- Platforms: 2
- Tracks: 2

Construction
- Structure type: Underground
- Accessible: Yes

Other information
- Fare zone: STIBM: Mi1

History
- Opened: 30 October 1983; 42 years ago

Services
Preceding station	Milan Metro	Following station
Romolo towards Assago or Abbiategrasso	Line 2	Sant'Agostino towards Cologno Nord or Gessate
Location

Porta Genova is a station on Line 2 of the Milan Metro. It was opened on 30 October 1983 as the terminus and part of the extension of the line from Cadorna. On 3 April 1985 the line was extended to Romolo.

The station is located between Via Valenza and Via Casale, very close to the Milano Porta Genova railway station.

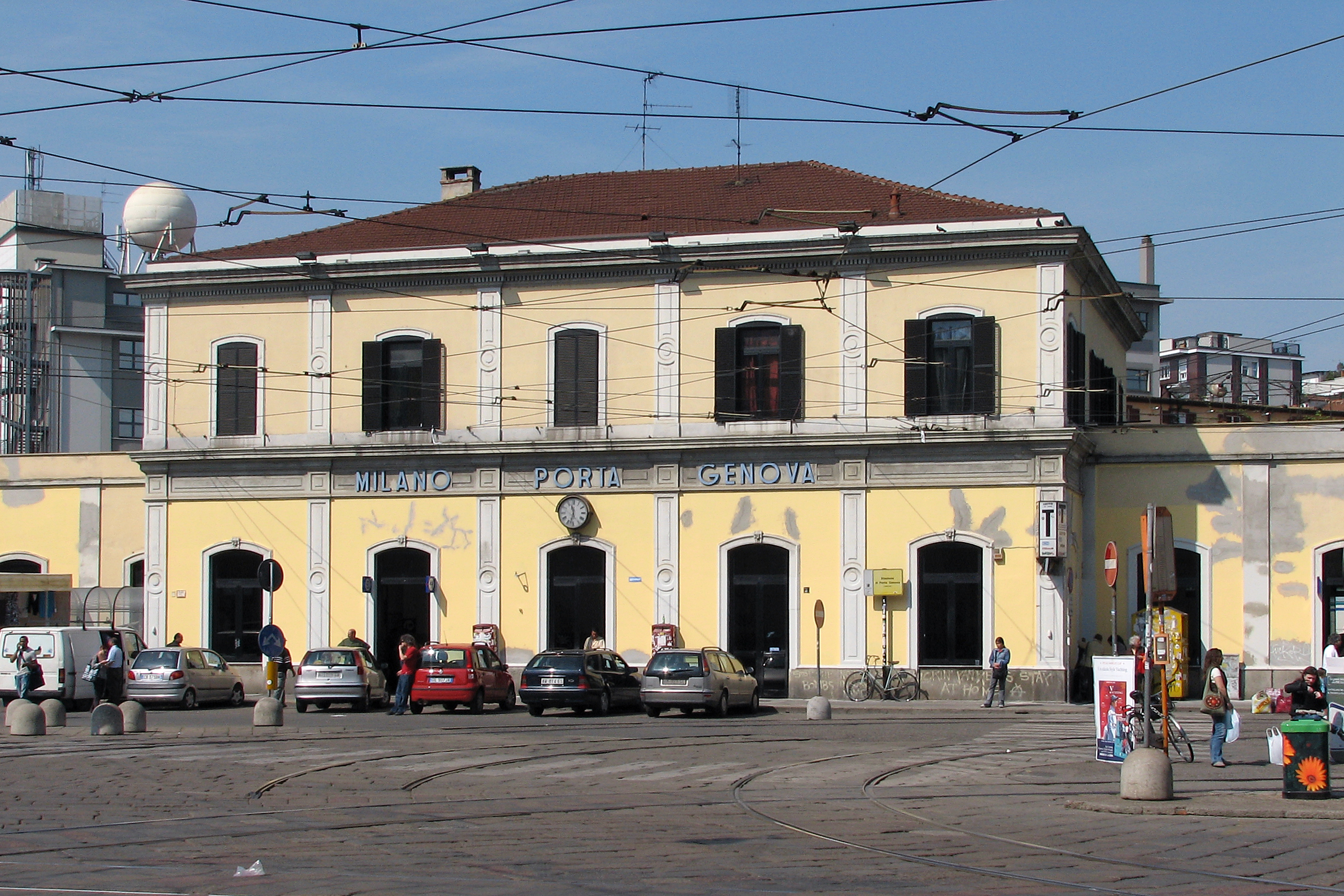
The RFI railway station
