= Cadorna (Milan Metro) =

Milan metro station

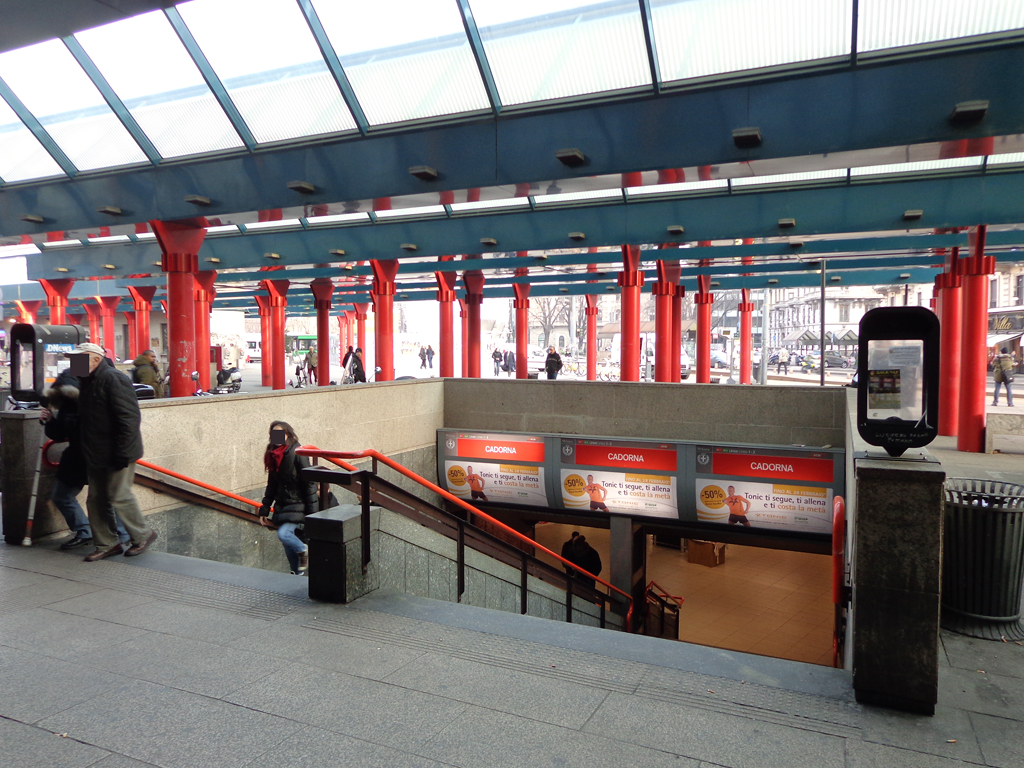

General information
- Location: Piazzale Cadorna, Milan
- Coordinates: 45°28′05″N 9°10′36″E
- Owner: Azienda Trasporti Milanesi
- Platforms: 2 (line 1); 2 (line 2)
- Tracks: 2 (line 1); 2 (line 2)
- Connections: Milan Cadorna railway station

Construction
- Structure type: Underground
- Accessible: y

Other information
- Fare zone: STIBM: Mi1

History
- Opened: Line 1: 1 November 1964; 61 years ago Line 2: 3 March 1978; 48 years ago

Services
Preceding station	Milan Metro	Following station
Conciliazione towards Rho Fiera or Bisceglie	Line 1	Cairoli towards Sesto 1º Maggio
Sant'Ambrogio towards Assago or Abbiategrasso	Line 2	Lanza towards Cologno Nord or Gessate
Location
- Location within Milan Location within Lombardy Location within Northern Italy Location within Italy

Cadorna FN is an underground interchange station in Milan, Italy, serving Lines 1 and 2 of the Milan Metro. The Line 1 station was opened on 1 November 1964 as part of the inaugural section of the Metro, between Sesto Marelli and Lotto. The Line 2 station was opened on 3 March 1978 as the southern terminus of the extension from Garibaldi FS. It served as the southern terminus of Line 2 until the extension of the line to Porta Genova on 30 October 1983.

The station is located at Piazzale Luigi Cadorna, opposite to Milano Cadorna railway station, within the municipal area of Milan. It is close to Sforzesco Castle, the Triennale and Parco Sempione.
