= Parco delle Groane =

Nature reserve in Lombardy, Italy

Parco delle Groane e della Brughiera Briantea
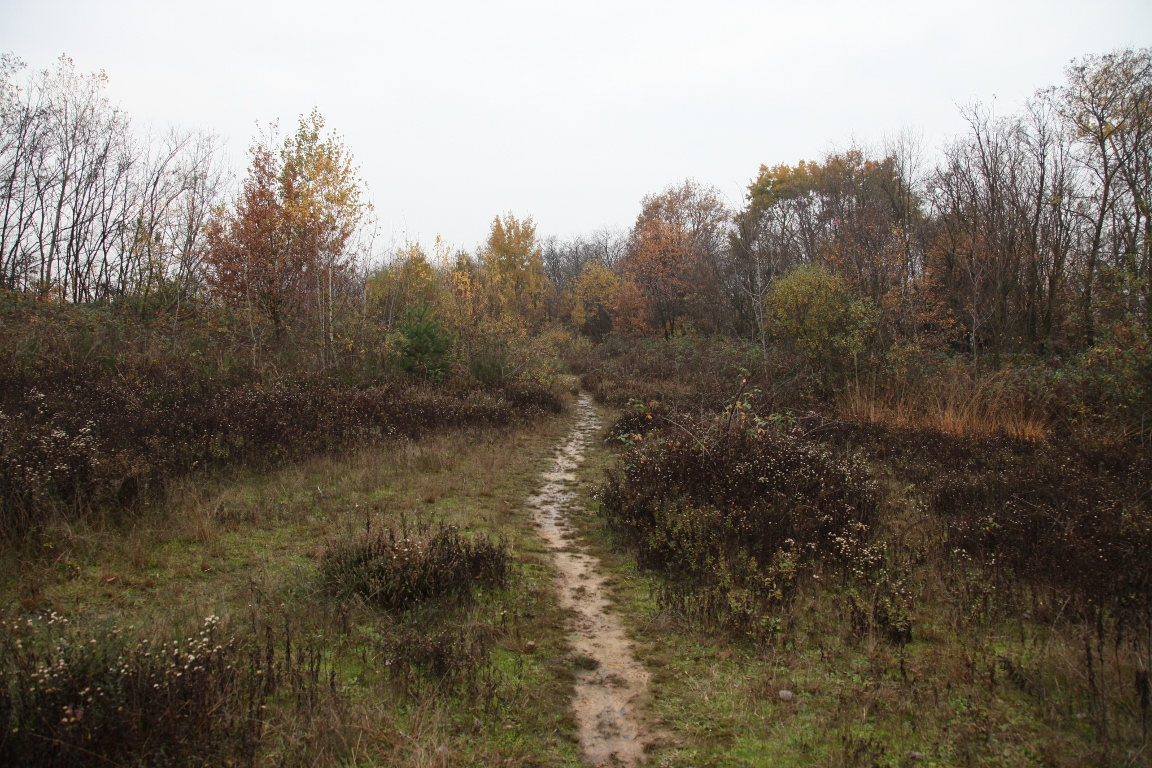
- Interactive map of Parco delle Groane e della Brughiera Briantea
- Location: Lombardy, Italy
- Area: 8,249 ha (20,380 acres)
- Established: 1976; 50 years ago
- Website: www.parcogroane.it

The Parco delle Groane e della Brughiera Briantea ("Park of the Groane and Brianza moorland") is a nature reserve in Lombardy, Italy. Established in 1976 (as Parco delle Groane) and enlarged in 2017, it covers over 8,000 hectares of woods and moorlands (locally known as groane) in the upper Po Plain northwest of Milan (between 160 and 300 meters above sea level), across the territory of 28 municipalities in the provinces of Milan, Como and Monza.

The park originally had an area of 3,695 hectares, but grew to over 8,200 in December 2017, when it absorbed the former PLIS Parco della Brughiera Briantea and the Fontana del Guercio Natural Reserve.

About one quarter of the park's area is covered in woods, mostly oak (Cornish oak and pedunculate oak) and pine (Scotch pines) forests, but Silver birches, sycamores, hornbeams, field elms and European ashes are also present. The rest of the park consist of moorland and farmland.

The fauna is varied. Amphibians include the Italian crested newt, the smooth newt, the European tree frog, the agile frog, the Italian agile frog, the edible frog, the fire salamander, the common toad, and the European green toad. Reptiles include the Western green lizard, the European wall lizard, the slow worm, the asp viper, the smooth snake and the grass snake.

Among the many bird species, the European green woodpecker, the great spotted woodpecker, the common kestrel, the common buzzard, the European honey buzzard, the Eurasian sparrowhawk, and the long-eared owl can be mentioned. Mammals include squirrels, dormouses, voles, hares, hedgehogs, moles, shrews, vesper bats, beech martens, weasels, foxes, badgers and in recent times, red deer.

The park is crossed by sixteen hiking paths, with a combined length of 100 kilometres.
