= Cusano Milanino =

- Comune
- Comune di Cusano Milanino
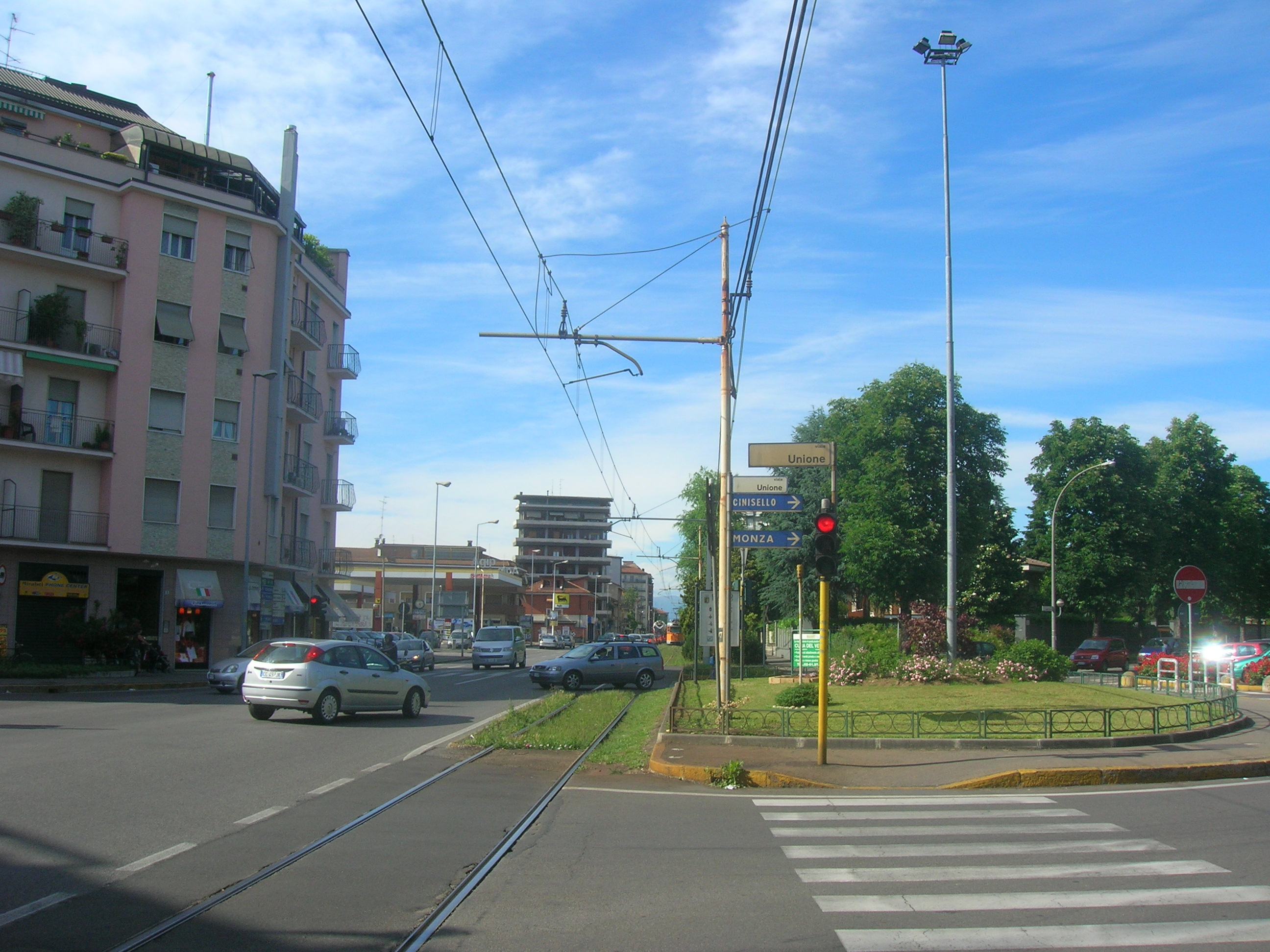

- Coat of arms

- Location within Italy Location within Lombardy
- Coordinates: 45°33′N 9°11′E
- Country: Italy
- Region: Lombardy
- Metropolitan city: Milan (MI)

Government
  - Mayor: Carla Maria Pessina

Area
  - Total: 3.08 km^{2} (1.19 sq mi)
- Elevation: 152 m (499 ft)

Population (31 December 2017)
  - Total: 18,797
  - Density: 6,100/km^{2} (15,800/sq mi)
- Demonym: Cusanesi
- Time zone: UTC+1 (CET)
  - Summer (DST): UTC+2 (CEST)
- Postal code: 20095
- Dialing code: 02
- Patron saint: St. Martin
- Saint day: November 11
- Website: Official website

Cusano Milanino (local Lombard: Cusan [kyˈzãː]) is a town and comune in the Metropolitan City of Milan, in Lombardy. Cusano Milanino is about 13 kilometers far from the centre of Milan. It borders Paderno Dugnano, Cinisello Balsamo, Cormano, and Bresso.

== People ==
The 18th-century Italian economist and antiquarian Count Carli died in the town, then part of the Duchy of Milan, in 1795. Cusano is also the birthplace of former football player and coach Giovanni Trapattoni.

== See also ==
- United Left for Cusano Milanino
