= Milan belt railway =

Railway line in Milan, Italy

Overview
- Native name: Linea di cintura di Milano

The Milan belt railway (Italian: Linea di cintura di Milano) is a semicircular railway in Milan, Italy. It links the railway lines converging on the city with each other and the Milano Centrale station.

The belt railway was built during the reorganisation of the Milan railway junction, completed in 1931. It replaced an older belt line, which formed a complete ring; only part of the southern section of the old line remains in service.

Map of the Milan railway junction following the changes implemented between 1914 and 1931

== See also ==
- List of railway lines in Italy
