= Saronno–Seregno railway =

Railway line in Italy

Overview
- Native name: Ferrovia Saronno-Seregno
- Termini: Saronno railway station; Seregno railway station
- Stations: 9

Service
- Type: heavy rail
- Services: S9
- Operator(s): Ferrovienord

History
- Opened: 1887

Technical
- Line length: 15.240 km (9.470 mi)
- Number of tracks: 2 (Saronno–Groane); 1 (Groane–Seregno)
- Track gauge: 1,435 mm (4 ft 8 1/2 in)
- Electrification: 3 kV DC, overhead line
- Operating speed: 120 km/h (75 mph)
- Highest elevation: 223 m (732 ft)
Route map

Saronno–Seregno railway is a railway line in Lombardy, Italy.

== History ==
The line was opened by the FNS on 31 December 1887.

== See also ==
- List of railway lines in Italy
