= Mortara–Milan railway =

Railway line in Italy

Overview
- Status: in use
- Owner: RFI
- Locale: Lombardy, Italy
- Termini: Mortara; Milan

Service
- Type: Heavy rail
- Operator(s): Trenord

History
- Opened: 17 January 1870

Technical
- Track gauge: 1,435 mm (4 ft 8 1/2 in) standard gauge
- Electrification: 3 kV DC

The Mortara–Milan railway is a railway line in Lombardy, Italy.

== History ==
The section from Mortara to Vigevano was opened in 1854 by the Kingdom of Sardinia. The section from Vigevano to Milan was put into service after the Italian unification, in 1870.

== See also ==
- List of railway lines in Italy
