= Albairate–Vermezzo railway station =

Railway station in Italy

Albairate–Vermezzo
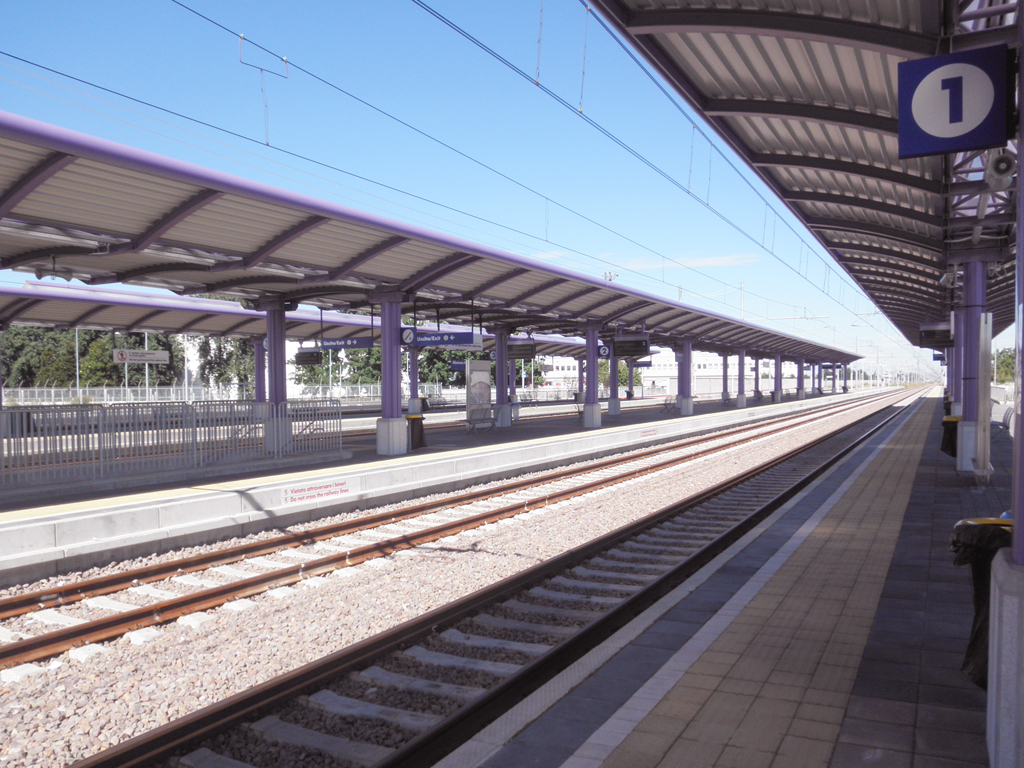

General information
- Location: Albairate, Milan, Lombardy; Italy
- Coordinates: 45°24′16″N 08°57′27″E
- Operator: Rete Ferroviaria Italiana
- Line: Mortara–Milan
- Distance: 23.042 km (14.318 mi) from Milano Centrale (old)
- Platforms: 3
- Tracks: 4
- Train operators: Trenord

Other information
- Fare zone: STIBM: Mi6
- Classification: Silver

History
- Opened: 7 December 2009; 16 years ago

Services
Preceding station	Trenord	Following station
Terminus	Line S9 (Milan suburban railway service)	Gaggiano towards Saronno
Location
- Location within Lombardy Location within Northern Italy Location within Italy

Albairate–Vermezzo railway station is a railway station in Italy. Located on the Mortara–Milan railway, it serves the municipalities of Albairate and Vermezzo.

== Services ==
Albairate–Vermezzo is the terminus of line S9 of the Milan suburban railway service, and is also served by regional trains from Milan to Mortara. Both of these services are operated by the Lombard railway company Trenord.

== See also ==
- Milan suburban railway service
