= Cesano Maderno railway station =

Railway station in Italy

Cesano Maderno
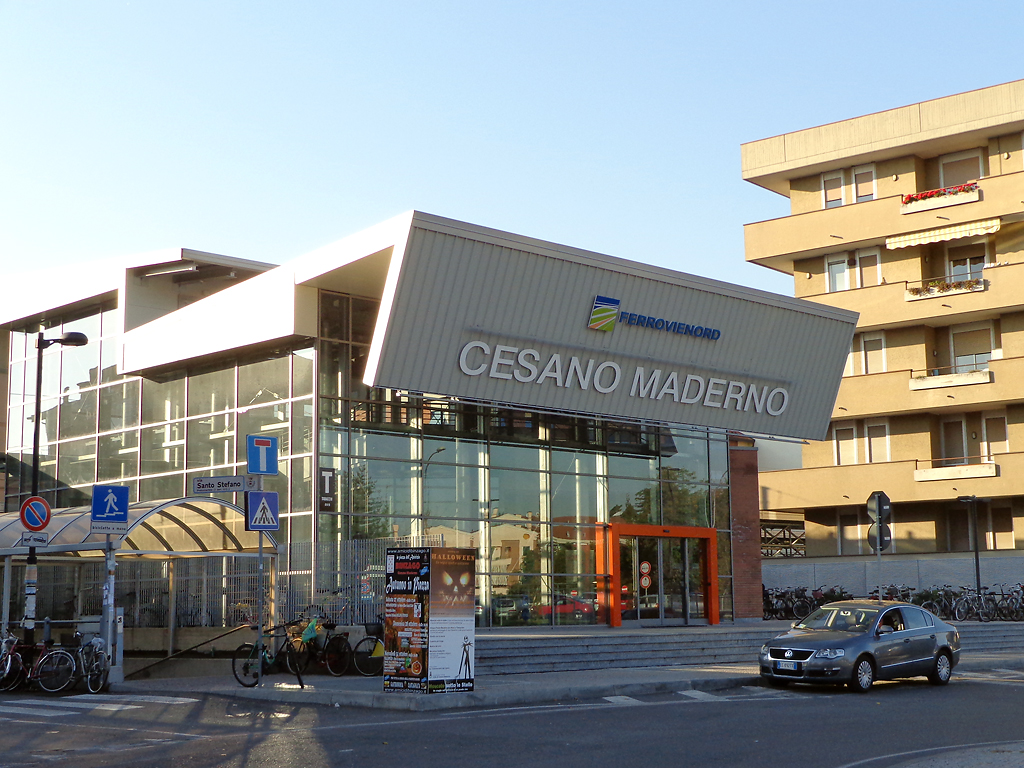

General information
- Location: Cesano Maderno, Monza and Brianza, Lombardy; Italy
- Coordinates: 45°37′54″N 09°08′31″E
- Operator: Ferrovienord
- Lines: Milan–Asso; Saronno–Seregno
- Distance: 31.259 km (19.423 mi) from Milano Cadorna (superior platform)
- Platforms: 3
- Train operators: Trenord

Other information
- Fare zone: STIBM: Mi5

History
- Opened: 12 June 2011; 15 years ago

Services
Preceding station	Trenord	Following station
Seveso towards Mariano Comense	Line S2 (Milan suburban railway service)	Bovisio Masciago–Mombello towards Milano Rogoredo
Seveso towards Camnago–Lentate	Line S4 (Milan suburban railway service)	Bovisio Masciago–Mombello towards Milano Cadorna
Cesano Maderno–Groane towards Saronno	Line S9 (Milan suburban railway service)	Seveso–Baruccana towards Albairate–Vermezzo
Location
- Location within Lombardy Location within Northern Italy Location within Italy

Cesano Maderno is a railway station in Italy. Located at the crossing of the Milan–Asso and Saronno–Seregno railways, it serves the town of Cesano Maderno.

== Services ==
Cesano Maderno is located on two levels: Milan suburban railway network lines S2 and S4 use the lower level, as do regional trains between Asso and Milan, while line S9 stops on the upper level. All services are operated by the Lombard railway company Trenord.

== See also ==
- Milan suburban railway network
