= Palazzolo Milanese railway station =

Railway station in Italy

Palazzolo Milanese
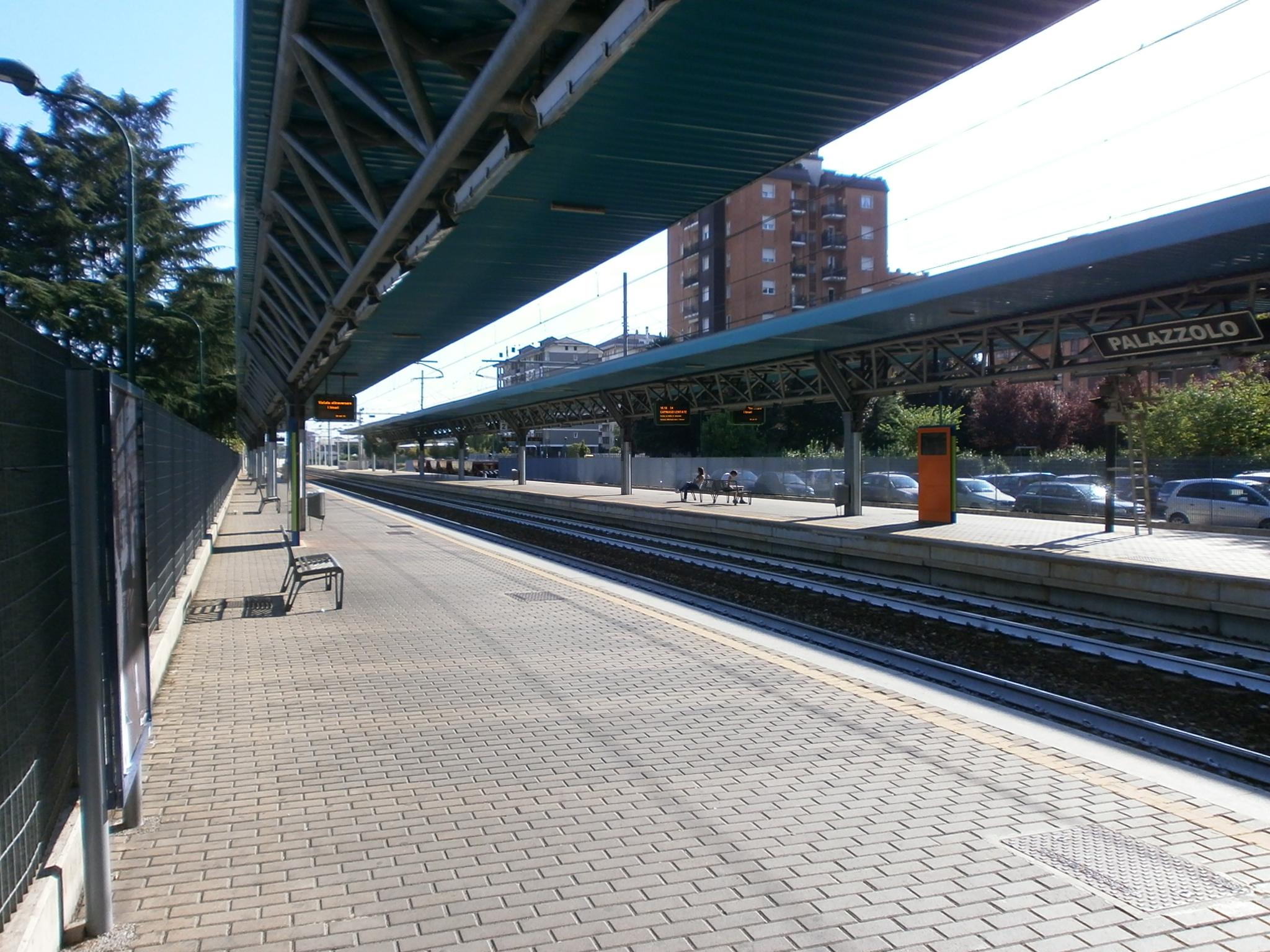

General information
- Location: Via Alessandro Coti Zelati 55; Paderno Dugnano, Milan, Lombardy; Italy
- Coordinates: 45°34′52″N 9°09′24″E
- Operator: Ferrovienord
- Line: Milan–Asso
- Distance: 13.467 km (8.368 mi) from Milan Cadorna
- Platforms: 3
- Tracks: 2
- Train operators: Trenord

Other information
- Fare zone: STIBM: Mi4

History
- Opened: 16 July 1879; 147 years ago
- Electrified: May 1929

Services
| Preceding station | Trenord | Following station |
|---|---|---|
| Varedo towards Mariano Comense | Line S2 (Milan suburban railway service) | Paderno Dugnano towards Milano Rogoredo |
| Varedo towards Camnago–Lentate | Line S4 (Milan suburban railway service) | Paderno Dugnano towards Milano Cadorna |
Location
- Location within Lombardy Location within Northern Italy Location within Italy

Palazzolo Milanese railway station is a railway station in Italy. It serves Palazzolo Milanese, a neighbourhood in the municipality of Paderno Dugnano. It was the first station of this line to be modernized with lifts, new and taller quays, shelters and underpasses. The station is located on Via Alessandro Coti Zelati.

== Services ==
Palazzolo Milanese is served by lines S2 and S4 of the Milan suburban railway network, operated by the Lombard railway company Trenord.

== See also ==
- Milan suburban railway network
