= Line S2 (Milan suburban railway service) =

Suburban rail service in Milan

Seveso–Milano Rogoredo
- S2
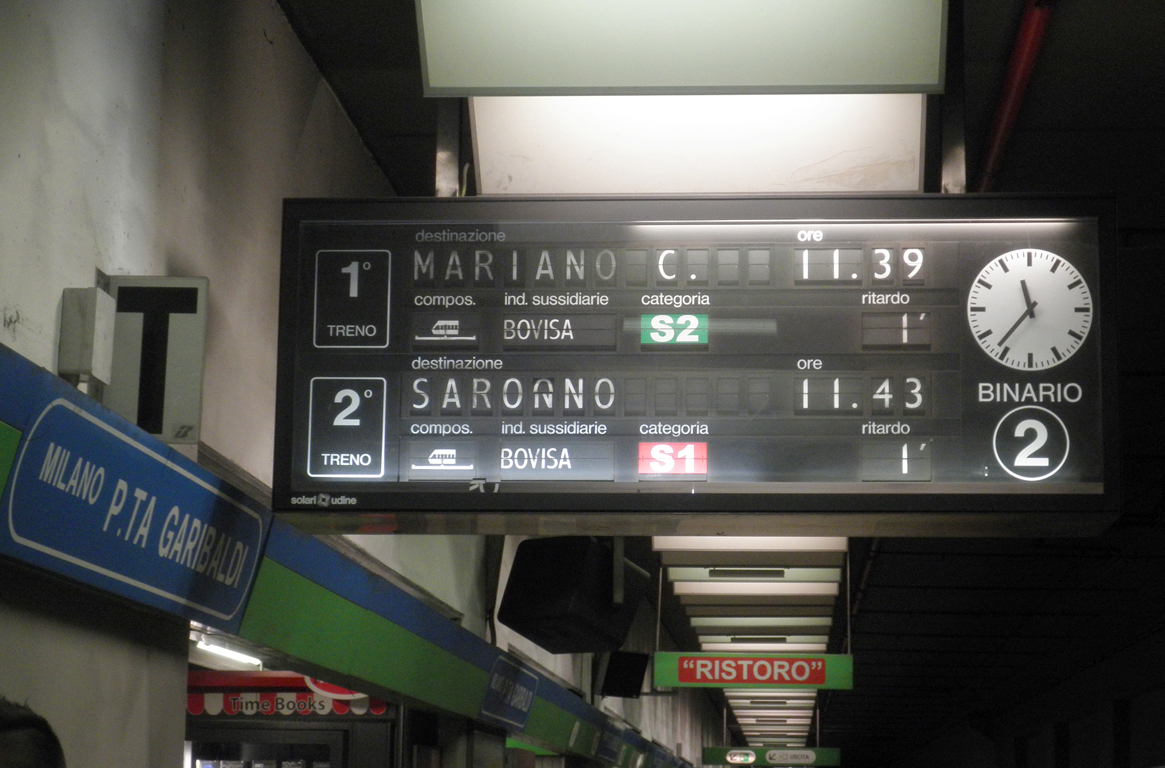
- Split-flap display at Milano Porta Garibaldi showing an S2 train to Mariano Comense as the next departure.

Overview
- Service type: Commuter rail
- System: Milan suburban railway service
- Status: Operational
- Locale: Milan, Italy
- First service: 2004
- Current operator: Trenord
- Website: Trenord (in Italian)

Route
- Termini: Mariano Comense; Milano Rogoredo
- Stops: 20
- Distance travelled: 34 km (21 mi)

Technical
- Rolling stock: Treno Alta Frequentazione
- Track gauge: 1,435 mm (4 ft 8 1/2 in)
- Electrification: 3,000 V DC
- Timetable number: S2
Route map

The S2 is a commuter rail route forming part of the Milan suburban railway service (Italian: Servizio ferroviario suburbano di Milano), which converges on the city of Milan, Italy.

The service operates over the Milan–Asso and Milan Passante lines. Like all other Milan suburban railway service routes, it is operated by Trenord.

== Route ==
S2, a cross-city route, heads initially in a southwesterly direction from Mariano Comense to Seveso, and then south to Milano Bovisa-Politecnico. From there, the line runs across the municipality of Milan, via the Milan Passante railway, to Milano Rogoredo. The journey takes 1h08'.

== History ==
The S2 was introduced on 12 December 2004, and operated initially between Mariano Comense and Milano Porta Vittoria.

With the change of timetable on 15 June 2008, the service was extended from Milano Porta Vittoria to Milano Rogoredo, where there is interchange with regional trains and long-distance services to and from Genoa, Bologna and Mantua.

The initial plans for the service foresaw a further extension from Milano Rogoredo to Pavia, but that has not materialized: Pavia has since been connected to the suburban railway service by the new S13; service is planned to extend to Pieve Emanuele as soon as the infrastructure will allow it, with the quad tracking of the section in order to separate long distance and regional trains from suburban trains.

== Stations ==
The stations on the S2 are as follows (stations with blue background are in the municipality of Milan):

| Station | Opened | Interchange | Note |
|---|---|---|---|
| Mariano Comense | 1879 | Treni regionali | limited service |
| Cabiate | 1879 | Treni regionali | limited service |
| Meda | 1879 | Treni regionali | limited service |
| Seveso | 1879 | Treni regionali | |
| Cesano Maderno | 2011 | Treni regionali | |
| Bovisio Masciago-Mombello | 1879 | Line S4 (Milan suburban railway service) | |
| Varedo | 1879 | Line S4 (Milan suburban railway service) | |
| Palazzolo Milanese | 1879 | Line S4 (Milan suburban railway service) | |
| Paderno Dugnano | 1879 | Line S4 (Milan suburban railway service) | |
| Cormano-Cusano | 2015 | Line S4 (Milan suburban railway service) | |
| Milano Bruzzano | 2014 | Line S4 (Milan suburban railway service) | |
| Milano Affori | 2011 | Line M3 Treni regionali | |
| Milano Bovisa | 1991 | MXP | |
| Milano Lancetti | 1997 | Line S11 Line S12 Line S13 | |
| Milano Porta Garibaldi | 1997 | MXP | |
| Milano Repubblica | 1997 | Line M3 Line S12 Line S13 | |
| Milano Porta Venezia | 1997 | Line M1 Line S12 Line S13 | |
| Milano Dateo | 2002 | Line S12 Line S13 | |
| Milano Porta Vittoria | 2004 | Line S12 Line S13 | |
| Milano Rogoredo | 1862 | Line M3 Line S12 Line S13 Treni regionali | |

== See also ==
- History of rail transport in Italy
- List of Milan suburban railway stations
- Rail transport in Italy
- Transport in Milan
