= Cabiate railway station =

Railway station in Italy

Cabiate
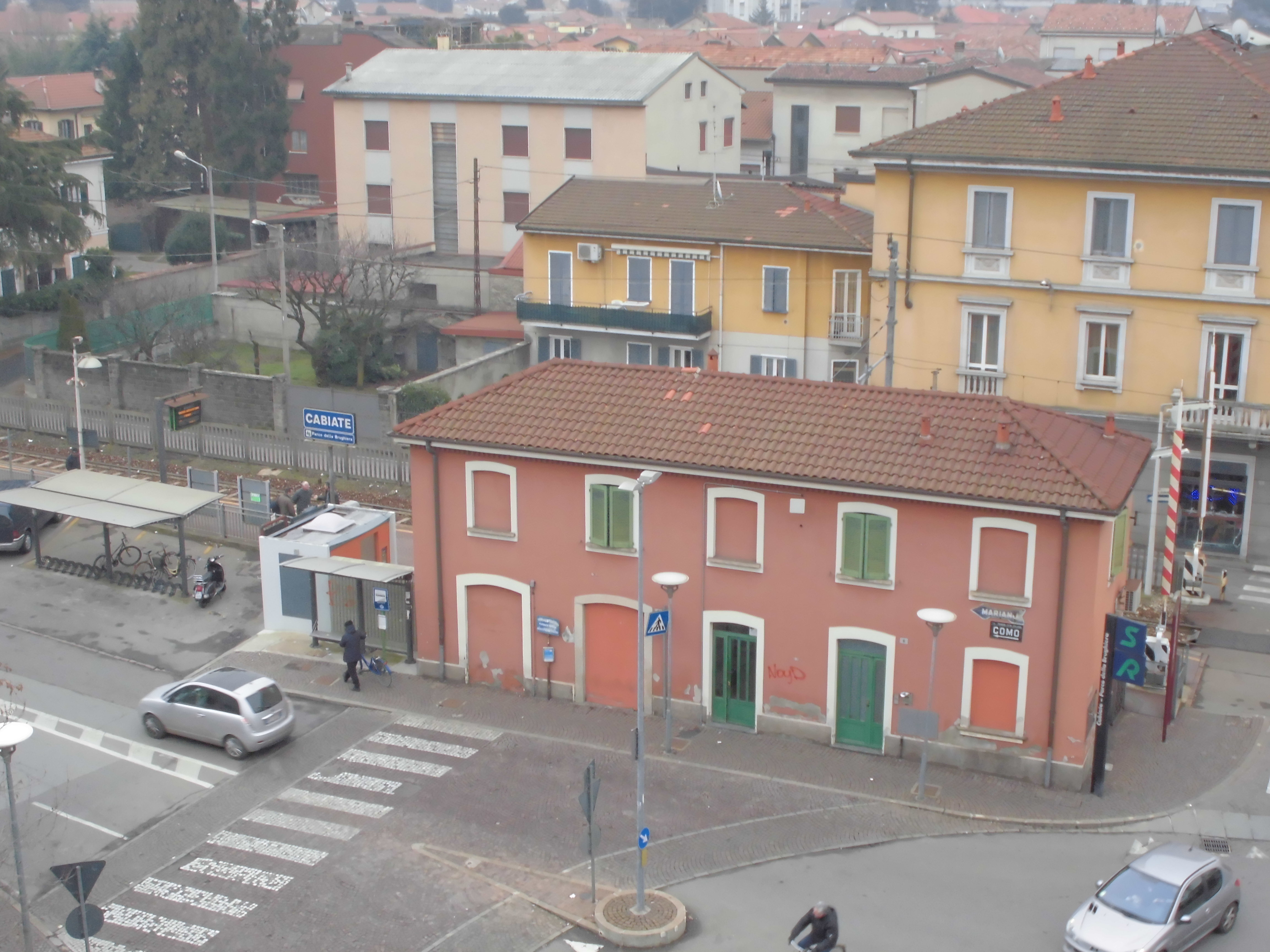

General information
- Location: Piazza Libertà; Cabiate, Como, Lombardy; Italy
- Coordinates: 45°40′00″N 09°10′00″E
- Operator: Ferrovienord
- Line: Milan–Asso
- Distance: 25.151 km (15.628 mi) from Milan Cadorna
- Platforms: 1
- Tracks: 1
- Train operators: Trenord
- Connections: C80 Monza-Meda-Cantù buses

Other information
- Fare zone: 6

History
- Opened: 1879; 147 years ago
- Electrified: May 1929

Services
Preceding station	Trenord	Following station
Mariano Comense Terminus	Line S2 (Milan suburban railway service)	Meda towards Milano Rogoredo
Location
- Location within Lombardy Location within Northern Italy Location within Italy

Cabiate - Parco della Brughiera railway station is a railway station in Italy. Located on the Milan–Asso railway, it serves the town of Cabiate and it also represents the principal entrance to the Parco della Brughiera, a wood from Cabiate to Montorfano. Here there's also an interchange with the C80 autobus line Monza-Meda-Cantù.

== Services ==
Cabiate is served by the line S2 of the Milan suburban railway network, and by the regional line Milan–Asso. Both of them are operated by the lombard railway company Trenord.

== See also ==
- Milan-Asso railway
- Milan suburban railway network
- Cabiate
