= Milano Bovisa railway station =

Railway station in Bovisa, Milan, Italy

Milano Bovisa
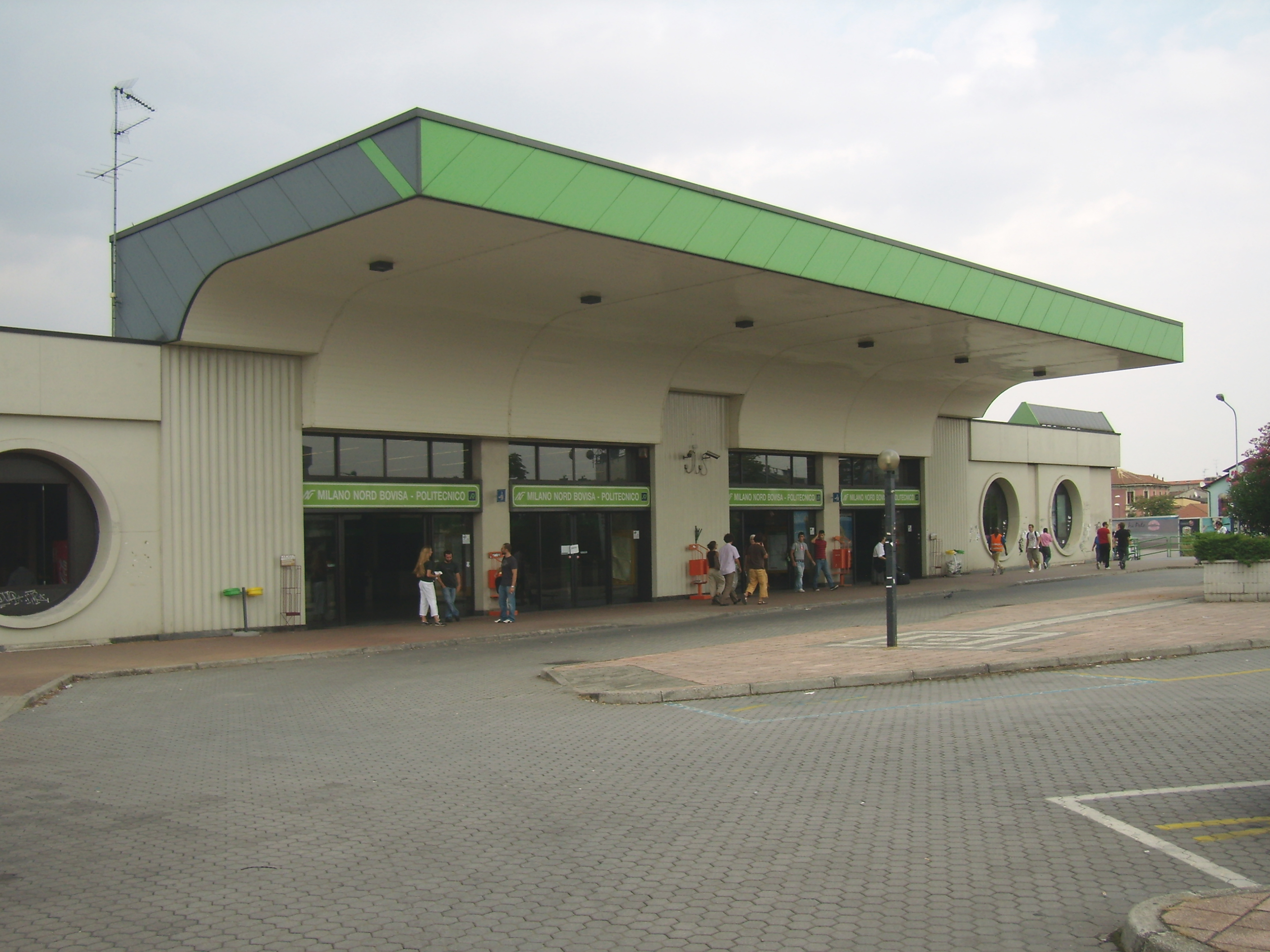

General information
- Location: Piazza Emilio Alfieri 9, Milan; Italy
- Coordinates: 45°30′09″N 09°09′33″E
- Owner: Ferrovienord
- Operator: Trenord
- Lines: Milan–Asso; Milan–Saronno; Passante
- Platforms: 5
- Tracks: 8
- Connections: ATM trolleybuses ATM buses

Other information
- Fare zone: STIBM: Mi1

History
- Opened: 25 March 1879; 147 years ago
- Rebuilt: 1991; 35 years ago
- Electrified: May 1929

Services
Preceding station	Trenord	Following station
Milano Quarto Oggiaro towards Saronno	Line S1 (Milan suburban railway service)	Milano Lancetti towards Lodi
Milano Affori towards Mariano Comense	Line S2 (Milan suburban railway service)	Milano Lancetti towards Milano Rogoredo
Milano Quarto Oggiaro towards Saronno	Line S3 (Milan suburban railway service)	Milano Domodossola towards Milano Cadorna
Milano Affori towards Camnago–Lentate	Line S4 (Milan suburban railway service)	Milano Domodossola towards Milano Cadorna
Milano Affori towards Cormano–Cusano Milanino	Line S12 (Milan suburban railway service)	Milano Lancetti towards Melegnano
Terminus	Line S13 (Milan suburban railway service)	Milano Lancetti towards Pavia
Location
- Location within Milan Location within Lombardy Location within Northern Italy Location within Italy

Milano Bovisa is a railway station in Bovisa, Milan, Italy. It opened in 1879 and is now one of the key nodes of the Milan suburban railway service, and of the Trenord regional network in northern Lombardy. It is located in Piazza Emilio Alfieri.

The station serves the Bovisa neighborhood, in the northwestern part of the Milan municipality, and in particular the Bovisa Campus of the Politecnico di Milano, the biggest technical university in Italy.

The station is served by lines S1, S2, S3, S4, S12, and S13 of the Milan suburban railway service, by the Milan–Asso, Milan–Saronno–Como, Milan–Saronno–Novara and Milan–Saronno–Varese–Laveno regional lines, and by the Malpensa Express.

== See also ==
- Railway stations in Milan
- Milan suburban railway service
- Milan Passante railway
