= Milano Affori railway station =

Railway station in Milan, Italy

Milano Affori
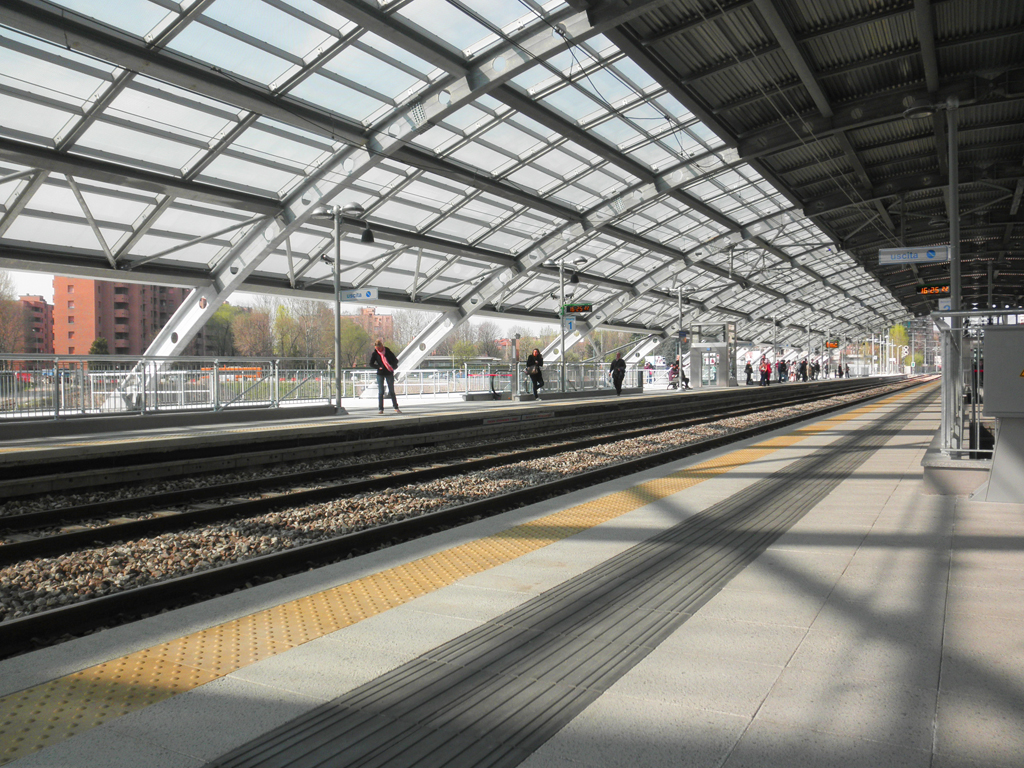
- The new station

General information
- Location: Affori, Milan; Italy
- Coordinates: 45°31′16″N 09°10′03″E
- Owner: Ferrovienord
- Operator: Trenord
- Line: Milano–Asso
- Distance: 6.4 km (4.0 mi) from Milan Cadorna
- Platforms: 3
- Tracks: 3
- Connections: Affori Nord MM

Other information
- Fare zone: STIBM: Mi1

History
- Opened: 1879; 147 years ago
- Rebuilt: 26 March 2011; 15 years ago

Services
Preceding station	Trenord	Following station
Milano Bruzzano towards Mariano Comense	Line S2 (Milan suburban railway service)	Milano Bovisa towards Milano Rogoredo
Milano Bruzzano towards Camnago–Lentate	Line S4 (Milan suburban railway service)	Milano Bovisa towards Milano Cadorna
Milano Bruzzano towards Cormano–Cusano Milanino	Line S12 (Milan suburban railway service)	Milano Bovisa towards Melegnano
Location
- Location within Milan Location within Lombardy Location within Northern Italy Location within Italy

Milano Affori is a railway station in the Affori neighborhood of Milan, Italy.

The present station was opened in 2011, connected to the Affori FN station on Line 3 of the Milan Metro. The old station, which is now closed, was built in 1879 and located about 0.5 km south of the current station.

== Services ==
Milano Affori is served by lines S2, S4 and S12 of the Milan suburban railway network, and by the Milano Cadorna–Asso regional line; all the lines are operated by the Lombard railway company Trenord.
