= Seveso railway station =

Railway station in Italy

Seveso
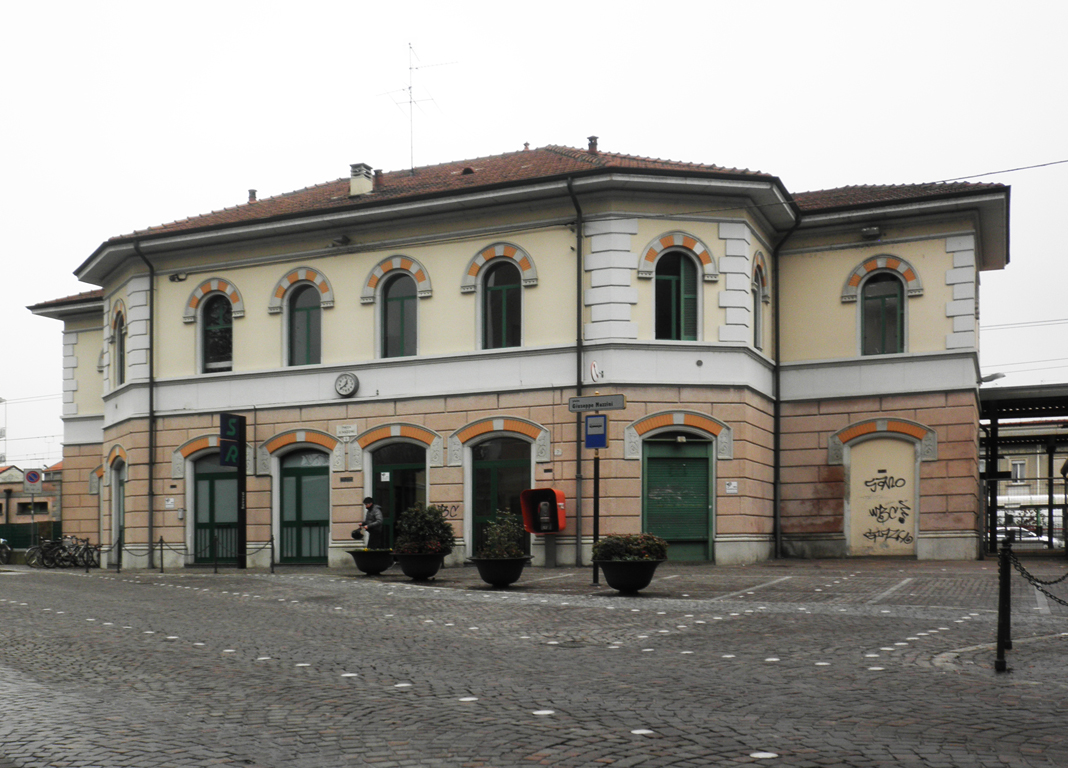

General information
- Location: Piazza Giuseppe Mazzini 6 Seveso, Monza and Brianza, Lombardy; Italy
- Coordinates: 45°38′54″N 09°08′26″E
- Operator: Ferrovienord
- Lines: Milan–Asso; Seveso–Camnago
- Distance: 21.208 km (13.178 mi) from Milan Cadorna
- Platforms: 3/4
- Tracks: 4
- Train operators: Trenord

Other information
- Fare zone: STIBM: Mi6

History
- Opened: 27 September 1879; 146 years ago
- Electrified: May 1929

Services
Preceding station	Trenord	Following station
Meda towards Mariano Comense	Line S2 (Milan suburban railway service)	Cesano Maderno towards Milano Rogoredo
Camnago–Lentate Terminus	Line S4 (Milan suburban railway service)	Cesano Maderno towards Milano Cadorna
Location
- Location within Lombardy Location within Northern Italy Location within Italy

Seveso railway station is a railway station in Italy. It is located on the Milan–Asso railway and is the origin of the branch to Camnago. It serves the town of Seveso.

== Services ==
Seveso is served by lines S2 and S4 of the Milan suburban railway network, and by the Milan–Asso regional line. All of them are operated by the Lombard railway company Trenord.

== See also ==
- Milan suburban railway network
