= Paderno Dugnano railway station =

Railway station in Italy

Paderno Dugnano
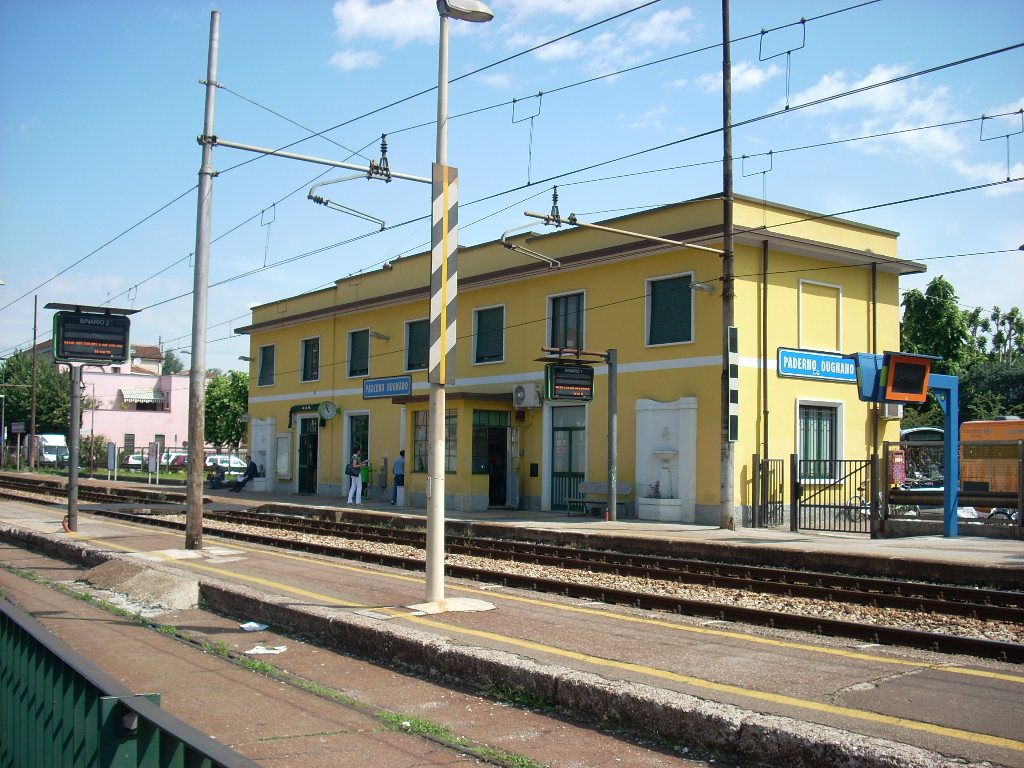

General information
- Location: Via IV Novembre, 2 Paderno Dugnano, Milan, Lombardy; Italy
- Coordinates: 45°32′53″N 09°10′26″E
- Operator: Ferrovienord
- Line: Milan–Asso
- Distance: 11.613 km (7.216 mi) from Milan Cadorna
- Platforms: 2
- Tracks: 2
- Train operators: Trenord

Other information
- Fare zone: STIBM: Mi4

History
- Opened: 16 July 1879; 147 years ago
- Electrified: May 1929

Services
Preceding station	Trenord	Following station
Palazzolo Milanese towards Mariano Comense	Line S2 (Milan suburban railway service)	Cormano–Cusano Milanino towards Milano Rogoredo
Palazzolo Milanese towards Camnago–Lentate	Line S4 (Milan suburban railway service)	Cormano–Cusano Milanino towards Milano Cadorna
Location
- Location within Lombardy Location within Northern Italy Location within Italy

Paderno Dugnano railway station is a railway station in Italy. It serves the town of Paderno Dugnano and is located on Via IV Novembre.

== Services ==
Paderno Dugnano is served by lines S2 and S4 of the Milan suburban railway network, operated by the Lombard railway company Trenord.

== See also ==
- Milan suburban railway network
