= Varedo railway station =

Railway station in Varedo, Italy

Varedo
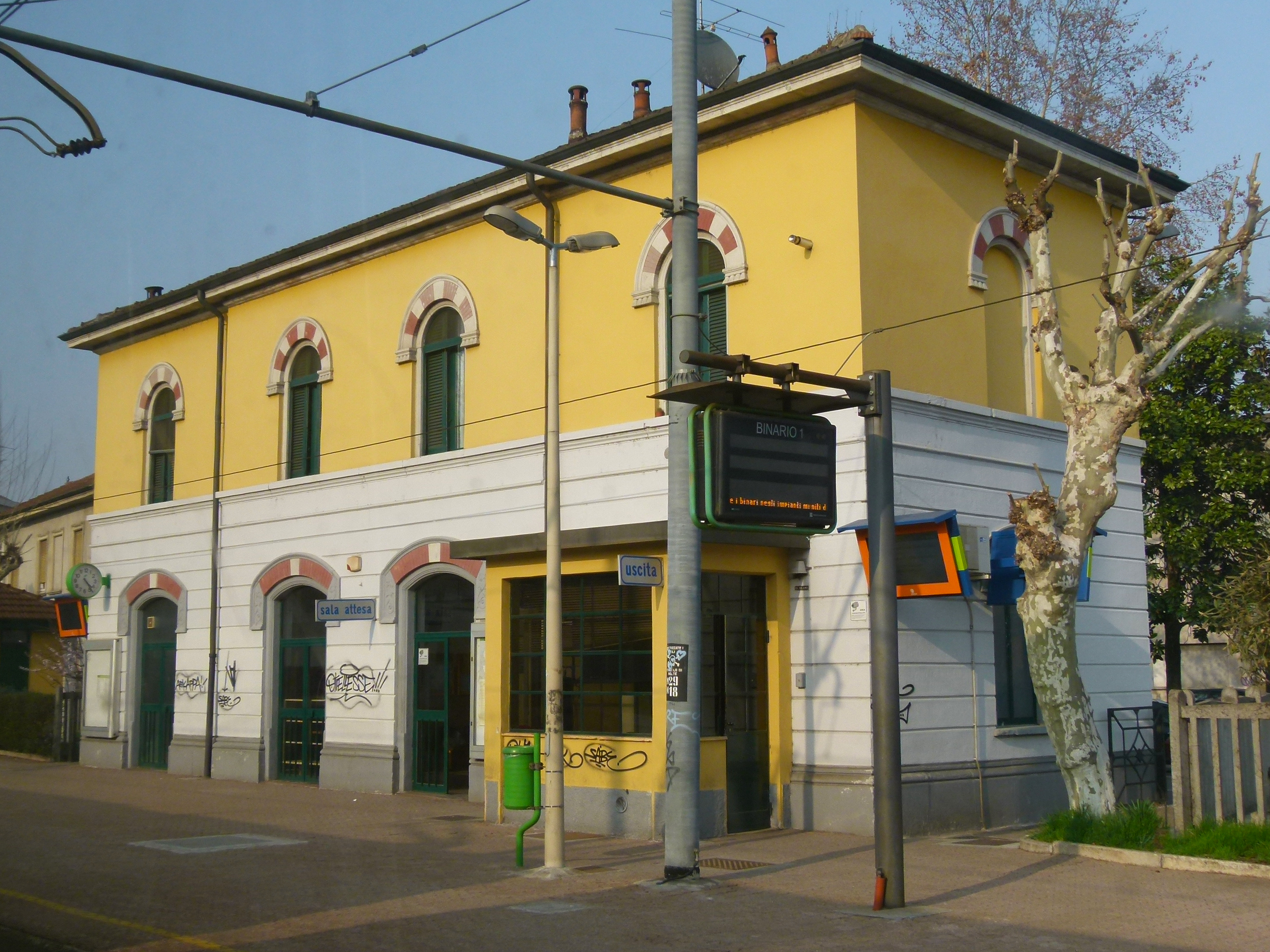

General information
- Location: Piazzale Stazione; Varedo, Monza e Brianza, Lombardy; Italy
- Coordinates: 45°36′00″N 09°10′00″E
- Operator: Ferrovienord
- Line: Milan–Asso
- Distance: 15.094 km (9.379 mi) from Milan Cadorna
- Platforms: 2
- Tracks: 2
- Train operators: Trenord

Other information
- Fare zone: STIBM: Mi5

History
- Opened: 16 July 1879; 147 years ago
- Electrified: May 1929

Services
Preceding station	Trenord	Following station
Bovisio Masciago–Mombello towards Mariano Comense	Line S2 (Milan suburban railway service)	Palazzolo Milanese towards Milano Rogoredo
Bovisio Masciago–Mombello towards Camnago–Lentate	Line S4 (Milan suburban railway service)	Palazzolo Milanese towards Milano Cadorna
Location
- Location within Lombardy Location within Northern Italy Location within Italy

Varedo railway station is a railway station in Italy. It serves the town of Varedo.

== Services ==
Varedo is served by lines S2 and S4 of the Milan suburban railway network, operated by the Lombard railway company Trenord.
