= Meda railway station =

Railway station in Italy

Meda
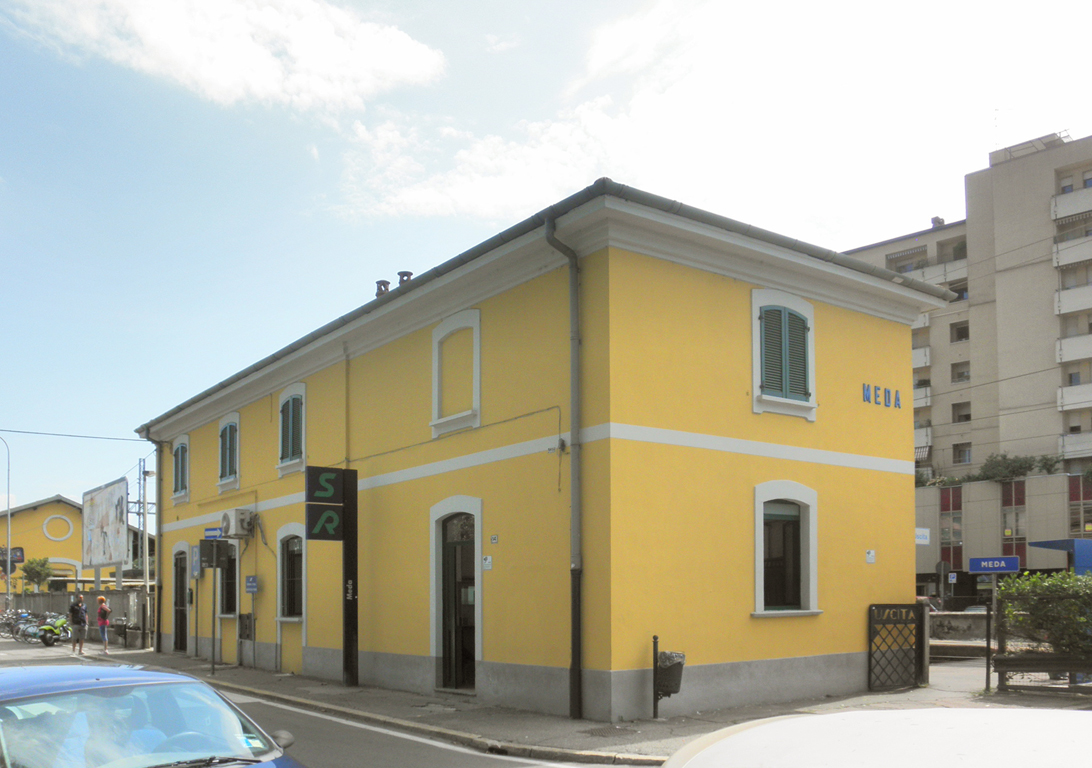

General information
- Location: Piazza Stazione 13; Meda, Monza and Brianza, Lombardy; Italy
- Coordinates: 45°39′45″N 09°09′32″E
- Operator: Ferrovienord
- Lines: Milan–Asso and Mariano Comense - Milan
- Distance: 23.453 km (14.573 mi) from Milan Cadorna
- Platforms: 3
- Tracks: 2
- Train operators: Trenord

Other information
- Fare zone: STIBM: Mi6

History
- Opened: 18 October 1879; 146 years ago
- Electrified: May 1929

Services
Preceding station	Trenord	Following station
Cabiate towards Mariano Comense	Line S2 (Milan suburban railway service)	Seveso towards Milano Rogoredo
Location
- Location within Lombardy Location within Northern Italy Location within Italy

Meda railway station is a railway station in Italy. Located on the Milan–Asso railway, it serves the town of Meda.

== Services ==
Meda is served by line S2 of the Milan suburban railway network, and by the Milan–Asso regional line. Both of them are operated by the Lombard railway company Trenord.

== See also ==
- Milan suburban railway network
