= Bovisio Masciago–Mombello railway station =

Railway station in Italy

Bovisio Masciago
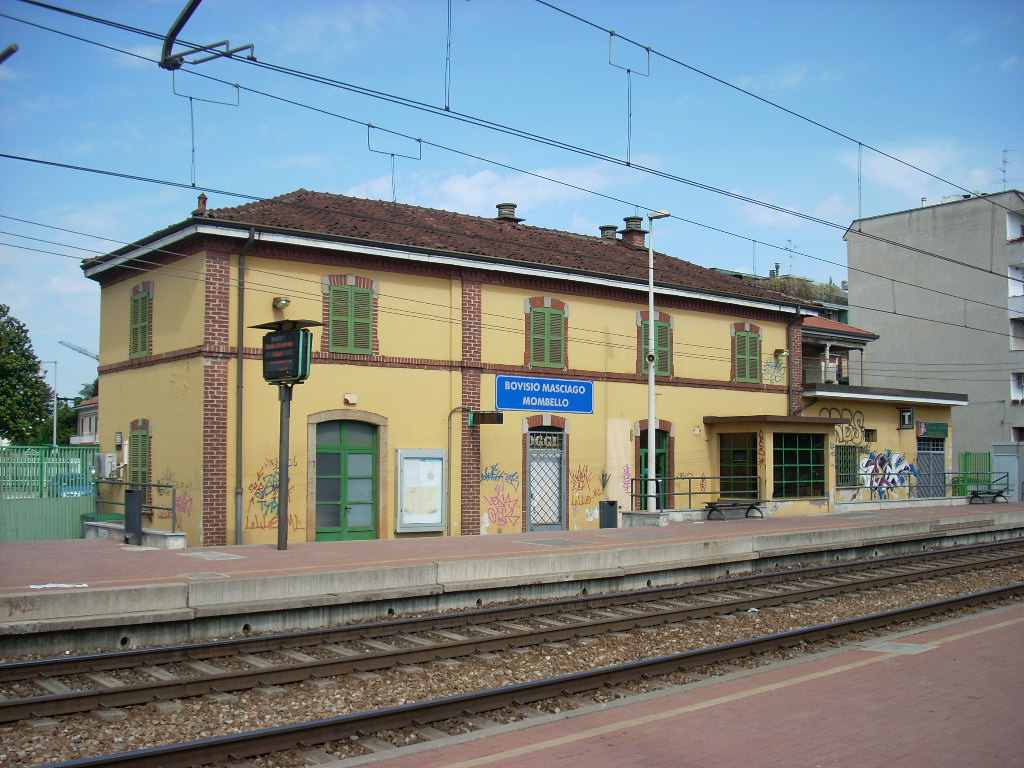

General information
- Location: Via Vittorio Veneto; Bovisio Masciago, Monza e Brianza, Lombardy; Italy
- Coordinates: 45°37′00″N 09°09′00″E
- Operator: Ferrovienord
- Line: Milan–Asso
- Distance: 17.167 km (10.667 mi) from Milan Cadorna
- Platforms: 2
- Tracks: 2
- Train operators: Trenord

Other information
- Fare zone: STIBM: Mi5

History
- Opened: 16 July 1879; 147 years ago
- Electrified: May 1929

Services
Preceding station	Trenord	Following station
Cesano Maderno towards Mariano Comense	Line S2 (Milan suburban railway service)	Varedo towards Milano Rogoredo
Cesano Maderno towards Camnago–Lentate	Line S4 (Milan suburban railway service)	Varedo towards Milano Cadorna
Location
- Location within Lombardy Location within Northern Italy Location within Italy

Bovisio Masciago–Mombello railway station is a railway station in Italy. It serves the town of Bovisio Masciago.

== Services ==
Bovisio Masciago–Mombello is served by lines S2 and S4 of the Milan suburban railway network, operated by the Lombard railway company Trenord.

== See also ==
- Milan suburban railway network
