= Cabiate =

Cabiate Cabiaa (Lombard)
- Comune
- Comune di Cabiate
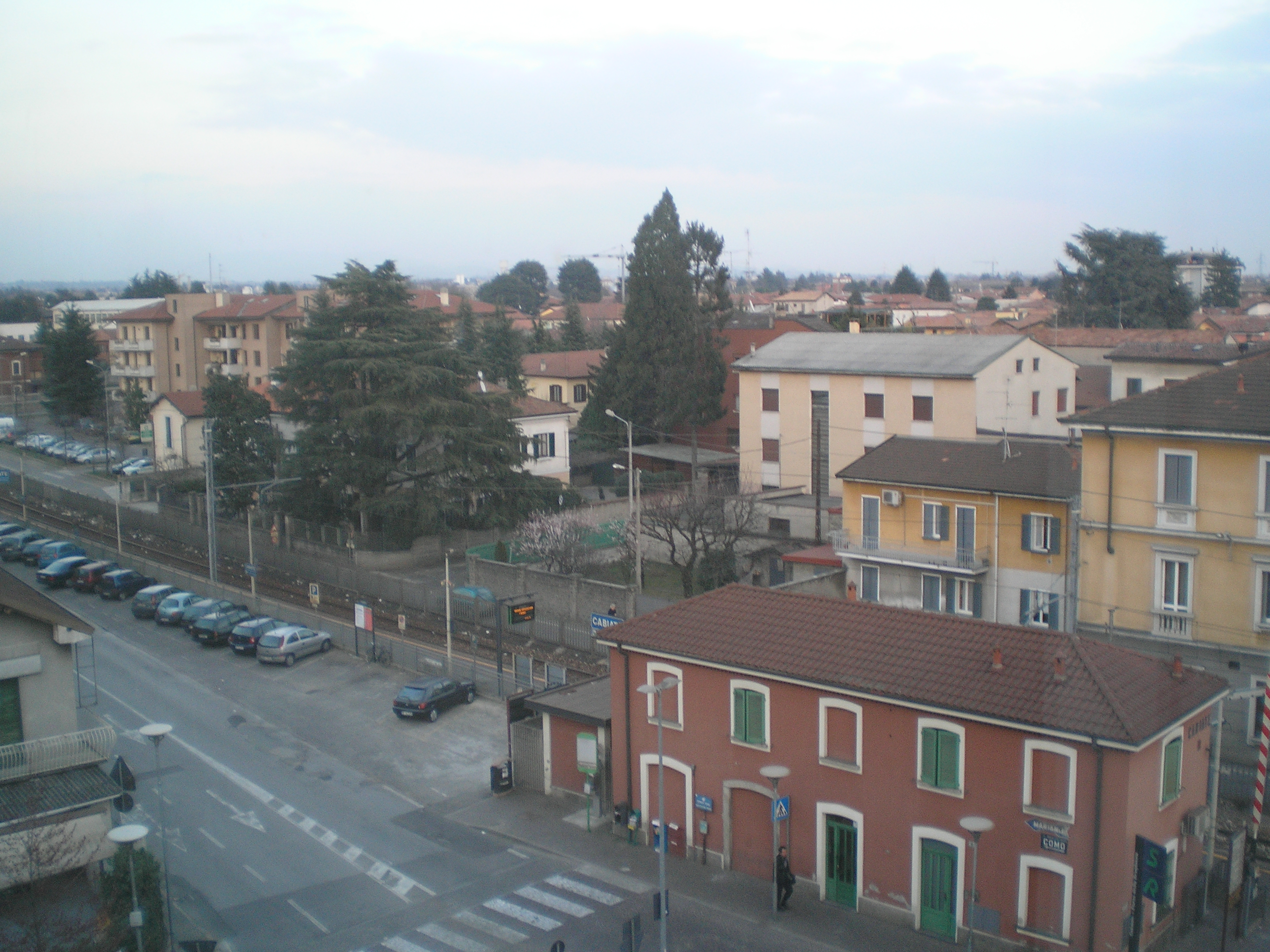

- Coat of arms

- Location within Italy Location within Lombardy
- Coordinates: 45°40′N 9°10′E
- Country: Italy
- Region: Lombardy
- Province: Como (CO)

Government
  - Mayor: Maria Pia Tagliabue

Area
  - Total: 3.2 km^{2} (1.2 sq mi)
- Elevation: 237 m (778 ft)

Population (31 December 2017)
  - Total: 7,509
  - Density: 2,300/km^{2} (6,100/sq mi)
- Demonym: Cabiatesi
- Time zone: UTC+1 (CET)
  - Summer (DST): UTC+2 (CEST)
- Postal code: 22060
- Dialing code: 031
- Website: Official website

Cabiate (Brianzöö: Cabiaa [kaˈbjaː]) is a comune (municipality) in the Province of Como in the Italian region Lombardy, located about 20 kilometres (12 mi) north of Milan and about 20 kilometres (12 mi) southeast of Como.

Cabiate borders the following municipalities: Lentate sul Seveso, Mariano Comense, Meda, Seregno.

== Physical geography ==
Cabiate is far:

- 16 km (9.9 mi) from Monza
- 21 km (13 mi) from Como
- 28 km (17 mi) from Milan
- 35 km (22 mi) from Lecco
- 40 km (25 mi) from Varese

== History ==
The name of the town comes from the word claveato. The final ending in -ate underlines a probable Lombard foundation.

First historical reference about the origin of the town comes from 745, when a document identifies it with the name Vico Capiete.

The town grew around a castle. The original position of the town was beside Terò creek, the small river which flows in the center of Cabiate.

The history of Cabiate is linked to the nearby Meda and to the Brianza. Before 1024 a huge number of Cabiatesi depended on the monastery San Vittore in Meda (which was part of the Pieve di Mariano Comense), which at any rate, thanks to the abbess Allegrezza, gave the power to Giacomo da Rho, founder of the family da Rho, who would have built a residence in Cabiate.

In the subsequent years, the history of this area was linked to Milan, and, from 1535, to the Spanish Empire. The town was turned to the Marliani family, then, in 1538, to the Giussani, then the Taverna, coming back to the Marliani and then in 1643 to Inverigo's Crivelli.

Three centuries later, the Duchy of Milan finally passed to the Austrians who replaced a wood bridge over Terò with one of masonry.

During the World War II the Germans passed through Cabiate during their retreat to Como. After April 25, 1945 three people were killed having been accused of being fascists.

== Main sights ==
- Santa Maria Nascente's "chapel", firstly quoted in 1389 in a document about the Pieve di Mariano Comense.
- Sanctuary of Santa Maria Annunciata
- Saint George's Church
- Oratory of San Luigi Gonzaga (one of the biggest youth center in Lombardy).
- Villa Padulli, built in the 19th century by the eponymous Milanese family. The family guests include Antonio Rosmini and Alessandro Manzoni.
- Villa Anderloni (18th century)
- Rho's Villa

== Economy ==
The town is home to several large companies working in the furniture sector. These include "Porada" (partner of Pallacanestro Cantù in the Basketball Serie A and of Torino Calcio in the Football Serie A) and the "Ezio Bellotti".

== Culture ==
Events in the town include:

- La Giubiana (last Thursday in January)
- Feast of San Luigi Gonzaga (first weekend of July, it ends on Monday)
- Nativity of the Theotokos (patronal feast, 8 September)

== Transports ==
Cabiate is served by the SS35 Milan-Como and the SS36 Milan-Lecco motorways.

It has a station on the Trenord regional line Milan Cadorna-Asso
