= Eduardo Montefusco =

Italian businessman, founder of FitActive fitness chain

- Born: 7 September 1982 (age 43); Naples, Italy
- Education: University of Milan-Bicocca
- Occupation: Entrepreneur
- Known for: Founder of FitActive
- Title: Founder & CEO of FitActive

Eduardo Montefusco (born 7 September 1982) is an Italian entrepreneur. He is the founder and CEO of FitActive, an Italian fitness franchise chain.

== Early life and education ==
Born in Naples, Montefusco grew up in Limbiate, in the province of Monza and Brianza. He obtained a technical diploma in Computer Science from the Luigi Galvani Institute in Milan and subsequently attended the University of Milan-Bicocca.

== Career ==
=== Early career ===
Montefusco began his professional career as a computer programmer, working on banking software development for companies in the digital payments sector, such as Nexi.

In 2006, he entered the fitness industry when he was commissioned to create management software for a local gym. He subsequently invested in the business, becoming a partner and managing the club's commercial and administrative operations.

=== FitActive ===
In 2007, Montefusco opened his first gym in Seveso. Following a market downturn in 2015 due to increased competition, Montefusco restructured the business model. Inspired by the German fitness market, he founded the FitActive brand, adopting a low-cost, 24/7 access model with a flat monthly subscription fee.

He later grew the business through franchising, becoming the leading chain in Italy by number of active clubs and among the top 20 operators in Europe by membership numbers and revenue,

During the COVID-19 pandemic in Italy, when gyms were subject to mandatory closures, the company shifted focus to digital services, offering live-streamed workout courses.

=== Other ventures ===
Since 2022, he has served as a board member of the "Valore Sport" Observatory at the Ambrosetti Forum, a think tank dedicated to the development of sports infrastructure in Italy.

== Awards ==
- 100 Eccellenze Italiane (2024) (100 brilliant Italians) : Awarded at Palazzo Montecitorio in Rome for business innovation.
