= FitActive =

Italian chain of fitness clubs

- Type: Private
- Industry: Fitness
- Founded: 2015; 11 years ago
- Founder: Eduardo Montefusco
- Headquarters: Milan, Italy
- Area served: Italy; Albania; Brazil; North Macedonia; Romania; Spain; Switzerland
- Key people: Eduardo Montefusco (CEO)
- Products: Gyms, Personal training, Fitness courses
- Revenue: € 126 mil
- Number of employees: ~760
- Parent: Fitness Investment S.r.l.
- Website: www.fitactive.it

FitActive is an Italian chain of fitness clubs operating via a franchising model. Founded in 2015 by Eduardo Montefusco, it is one of the largest gym chains in Italy by number of active locations.

== History ==
The company was founded in 2007 by entrepreneur Eduardo Montefusco, with the first location opening in Seveso, in the province of Monza and Brianza. Originally starting with a standard business model, the company shifted in 2015 to a "budget" or low-cost model, inspired by the German fitness market. This new format offered 24-hour access, 7 days a week, with a flat monthly subscription fee.

During the COVID-19 pandemic in Italy, when gym closures were mandated by the government, FitActive implemented digital training services, offering live-streamed workout classes to members.

By late 2024, the chain had expanded to over 150 locations throughout Italy. The company has also begun international expansion, with locations in Albania, Brazil, Romania, Spain, and Switzerland.

In September 2025, Club Athletico Paranaense signed an agreement with FitActive to open a fitness center within the Arena da Baixada stadium. This facility marks the brand's second location in Curitiba; the center, opened in February 2026, offers premium fitness services and operates 24 hours a day, five days a week.

In May 2026, FitActive announced the further expansion of its presence in the Spanish market through the acquisition of eight clubs operated by the KeasyFit chain in the country. The transaction was completed a few months after KeasyFit had sold its ten fitness centres located in Italy to the ViBE Fitness chain.

== Market position ==
According to the European Health & Fitness Market Report published by Deloitte, FitActive has been ranked as the leading operator in Italy by number of active clubs since 2020. The same reports have placed the company among the top 20 fitness operators in Europe by number of members and active locations.

== Media ==
On February 14, 2020, the company released a promotional single titled "Allena la felicità" (Train Happiness), performed by Italian singer Giorgio Vanni. The song was commissioned to introduce the brand's mascot, an alien character named "Ben". The lyrics reflect the chain's slogan of "fitness for everyone," regardless of origin or appearance. A music video combining animated sequences of the mascot and live-action behind-the-scenes footage was released on YouTube to accompany the track.

== Awards ==
In 2024 the company has been presented with the 100 Eccellenze Italiane (2024) (100 brilliant Italians) award, at Palazzo Montecitorio in Rome for business innovation.
