= Canzo–Asso railway station =

Railway station in Italy

Canzo–Asso
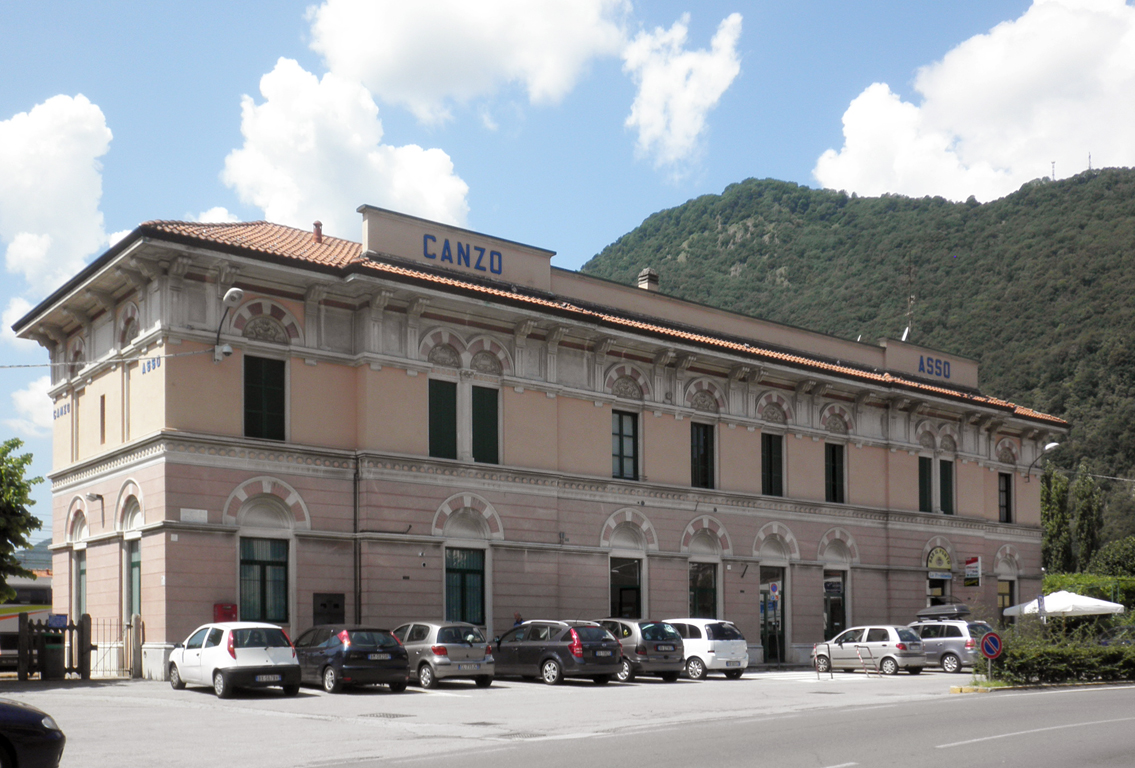

General information
- Location: Asso border Canzo, Como, Lombardy; Italy
- Coordinates: 45°51′18″N 09°16′09″E
- Operator: Ferrovienord
- Line: Milan–Asso
- Distance: 50.412 km (31.325 mi) from Milan
- Train operators: Trenord

History
- Opened: 16 June 1922; 104 years ago
Location
- Location within Lombardy Location within Northern Italy Location within Italy

Canzo–Asso is a railway station in Italy. It is the end of the Milan–Asso railway. It is located in the northernmost part of the town of Canzo.

== Services ==
Canzo–Asso is served by the regional trains operated by the Lombard railway company Trenord.

== See also ==
- Canzo
- Triangolo lariano

Preceding station	Ferrovie Nord Milano	Following station
Terminus	Trenord; R16	Canzo toward Milan Cadorna
