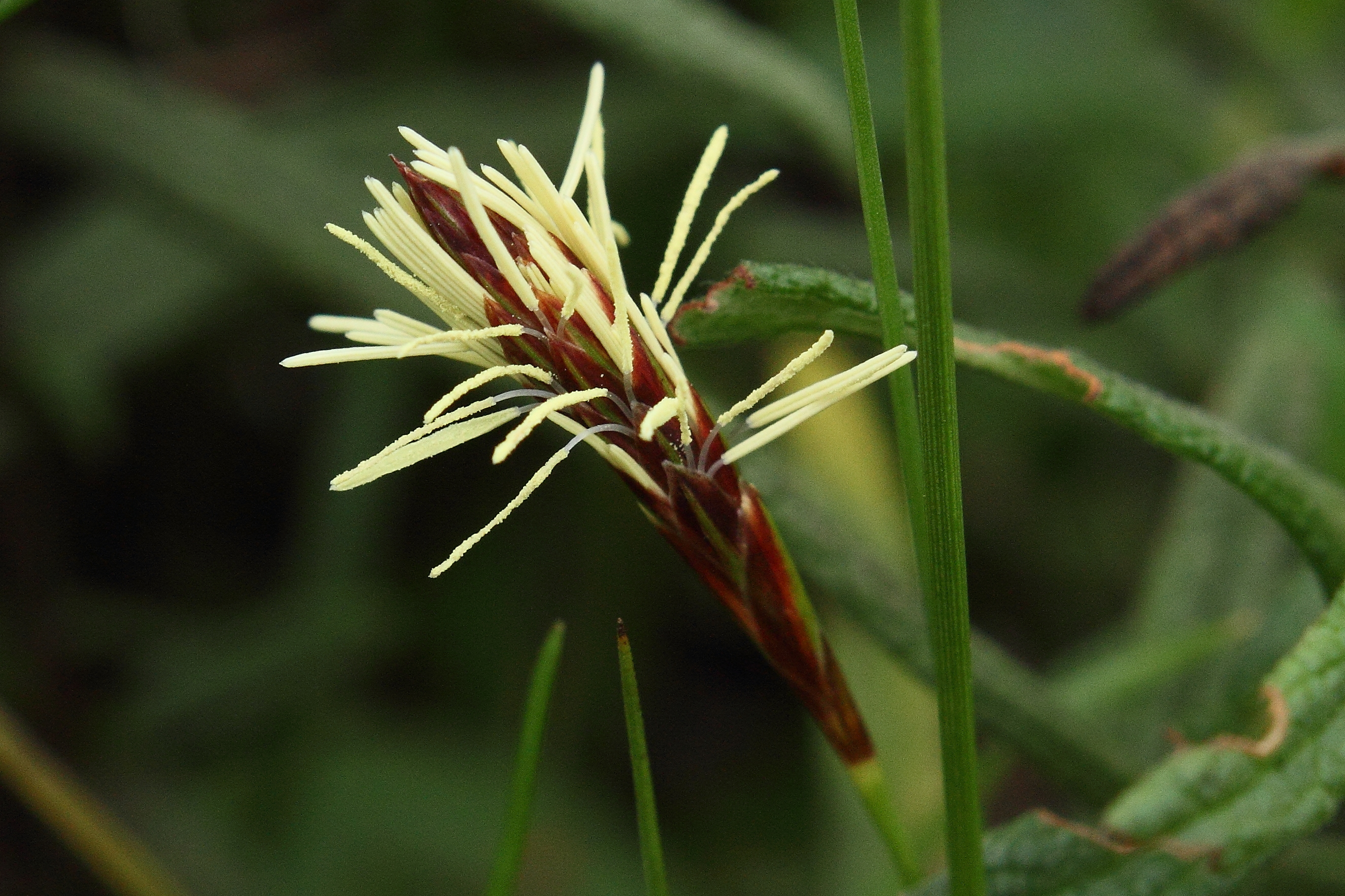

Scientific classification
- Kingdom: Plantae
- Clade: Tracheophytes
- Clade: Angiosperms
- Clade: Monocots
- Clade: Commelinids
- Order: Poales
- Family: Cyperaceae
- Genus: Carex
- Species: C. halleriana

Binomial name
- Carex halleriana Asso, 1779

= Carex halleriana =

Species of grass-like plant

Carex halleriana is a species of sedge found on rocky and grassy slopes. It occurs from Western Asia to southern Europe and northwest Africa.
