= Line S4 (Milan suburban railway service) =

Suburban rail service in Milan

Camnago Lentate–Milano Cadorna
- S4
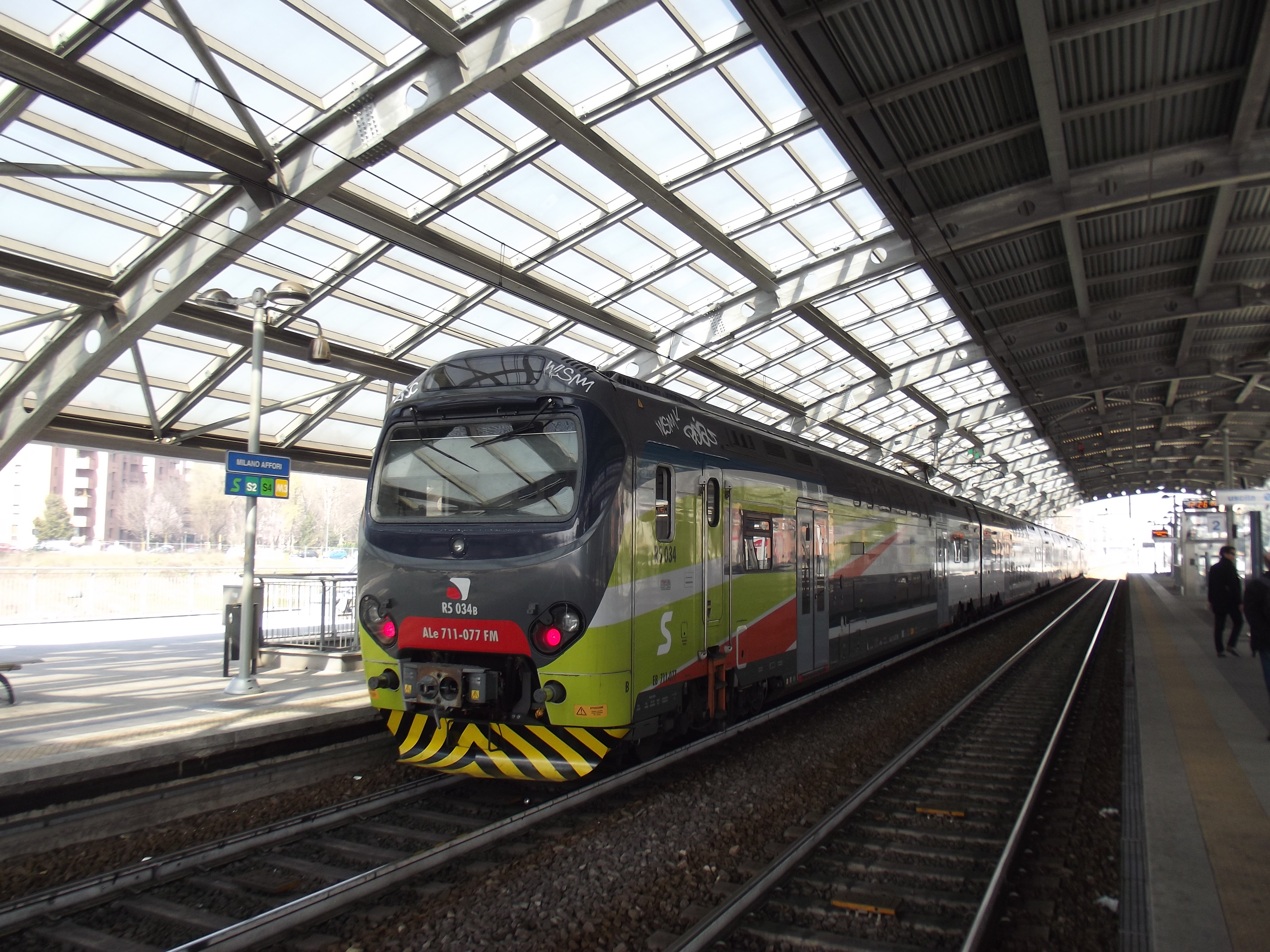
- An S4 train at Milan Affori.

Overview
- Status: Operational
- Locale: Milan, Italy
- Termini: Camnago-Lentate; Milan Cadorna
- Stations: 13
- Website: Trenord

Service
- Type: Commuter rail
- System: Milan suburban railway service
- Route number: S4
- Operator(s): Trenord

History
- Opened: 2004

Technical
- Line length: 23 km (14 mi)
- Track gauge: 1,435 mm (4 ft 8 1/2 in)
- Electrification: 3,000 V DC
Route map
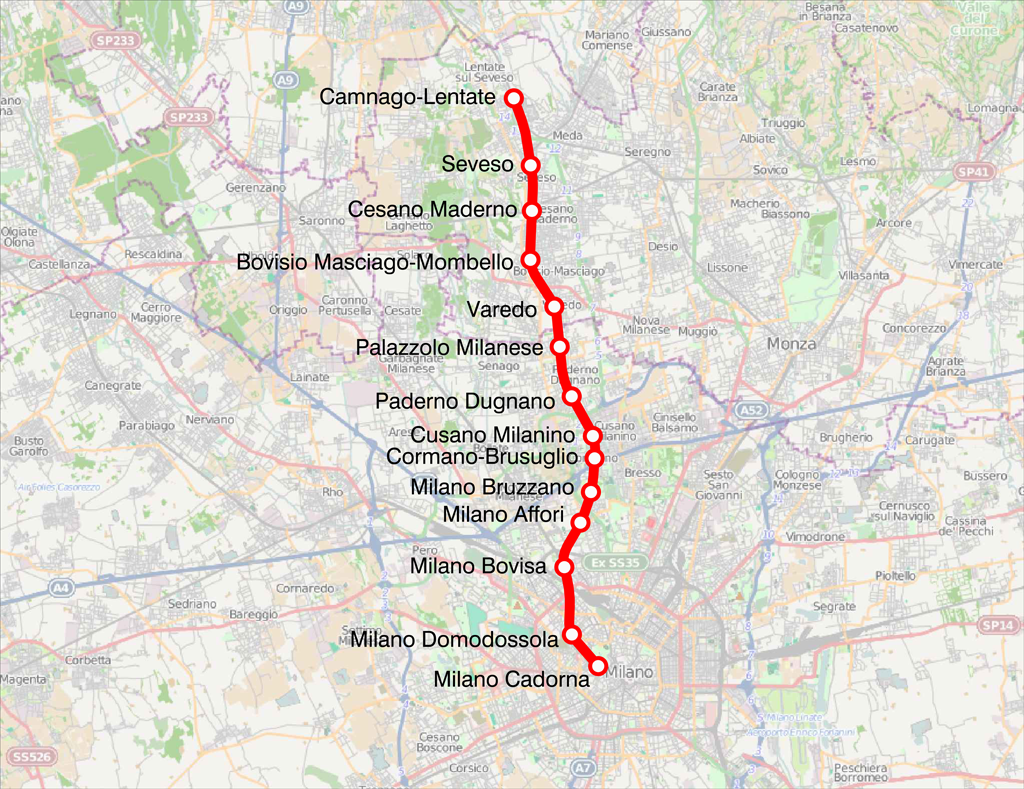
Map of line S4.

The S4 is a commuter rail route forming part of the Milan suburban railway service (Italian: Servizio ferroviario suburbano di Milano), which converges on the city of Milan, Italy.

The route runs over the infrastructure of the Milan–Asso railway. Like all other Milan suburban railway service routes, it is operated by Trenord.

== Route ==
- Camnago-Lentate ↔ Milano Cadorna

Line S4, a radial route, runs from Camnago-Lentate, in a southerly direction via the Milan–Asso railway, to Milano Cadorna, the railway's urban terminus. The travel takes 42 minutes.

== History ==
The S4 was activated on 12 December 2004 between Seveso and Milano Cadorna.

On 19 February 2006, the line was extended from Seveso to Camnago-Lentate.

== Stations ==
The stations on the S4 are as follows (stations with blue background are in the municipality of Milan):

Station	Opened	Interchange	Note
Camnago-Lentate	1849	Line S11	
Seveso	1879	Treni regionali	
Cesano Maderno	2011	Treni regionali	
Bovisio Masciago-Mombello	1879	Line S2 (Milan suburban railway service)	
Varedo	1879	Line S2 (Milan suburban railway service)	
Palazzolo Milanese	1879	Line S2 (Milan suburban railway service)	
Paderno Dugnano	1879	Line S2 (Milan suburban railway service)	
Cormano-Cusano	2015	Line S2 (Milan suburban railway service)	
Milano Bruzzano	2014	Line S2 (Milan suburban railway service)	
Milano Affori	2011	Line M3 Treni regionali	
Milano Bovisa	1879	MXP	
Milano Domodossola	2003	Line M5 Treni regionali	
Milano Cadorna	1879	MXP	

== Scheduling ==
As of 2012, S4 trains ran every half-hour between 06:00 and 21:00 daily. After 21:00, the connection between Seveso and Milano Cadorna was provided by S2 trains between Seveso and Milano Porta Vittoria, connecting at Milano Bovisa-Politecnico with S3 services to or from Milano Cadorna.

== See also ==
- History of rail transport in Italy
- List of Milan suburban railway stations
- Rail transport in Italy
- Transport in Milan
