= Walter Allievi =

Italian footballer (born 1960)

Personal information
- Date of birth: 14 January 1960 (age 66)
- Place of birth: Seveso, Italy
- Height: 1.76 m (5 ft 9 in)
- Position: Midfielder

Senior career*
Years	Team	Apps	(Gls)
1977–1978	Seregno		
1978–1980	Roma	2	(0)
1980–1981	Parma		
1981–1982	Roma		
1982–1984	Fano		
1984–1986	Perugia		
1986–1987	Catania		
1987–1989	Arezzo		
1989–1992	Solbiatese		
1992–1993	Gallaratese		
1993–1995	Meda		
- * Club domestic league appearances and goals

Walter Allievi (born 14 January 1960 in Seveso) is an Italian former footballer who played as a midfielder.
