= Milano Lancetti railway station =

Underground railway station in Milan, Italy

Milano Lancetti
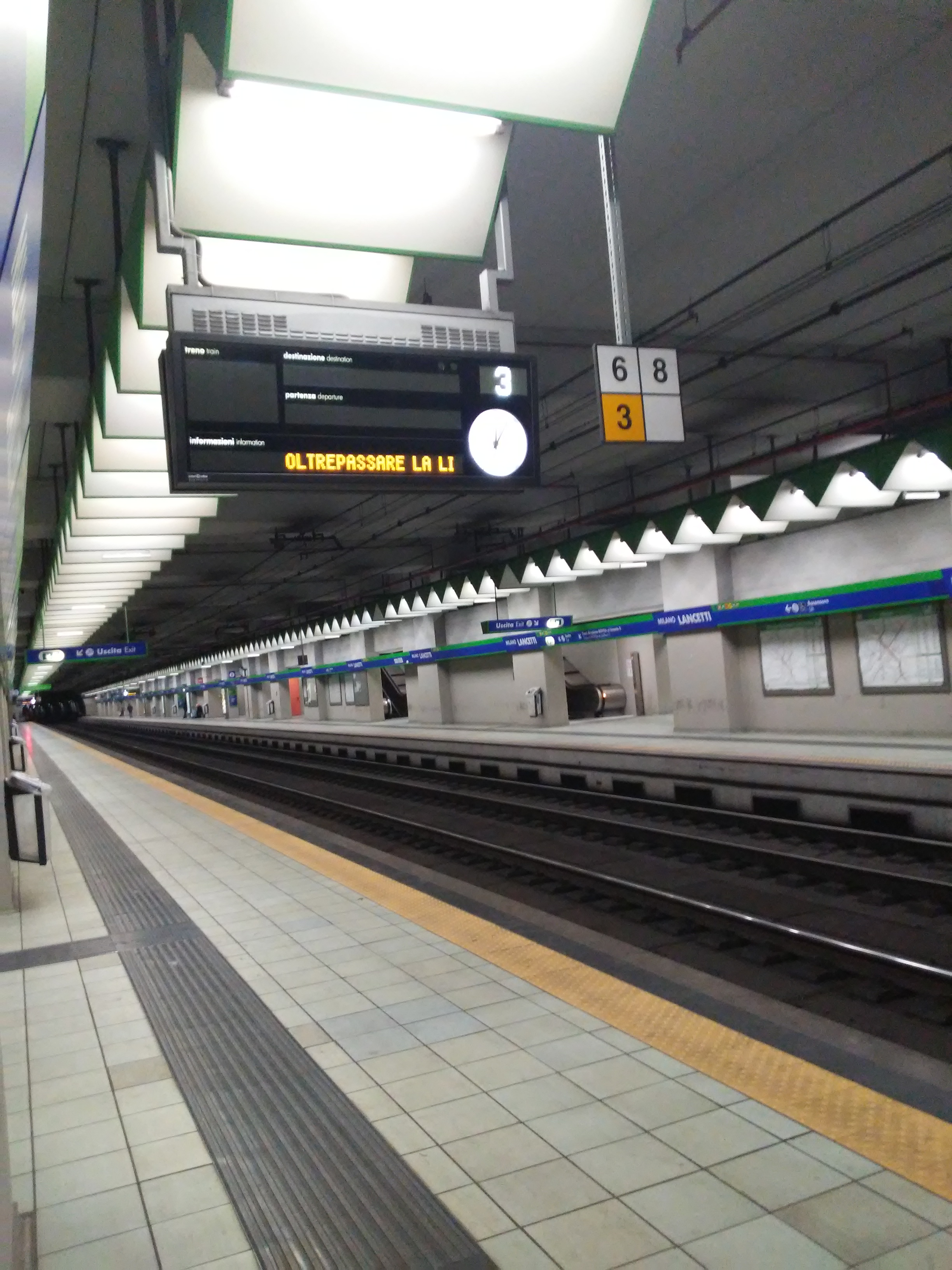
- Platforms

General information
- Location: Viale Vincenzo Lancetti; Milan, Milan, Lombardy; Italy
- Coordinates: 45°29′42″N 09°10′34″E
- Owner: Rete Ferroviaria Italiana
- Operator: Trenord
- Line: Passante
- Platforms: 3
- Tracks: 4
- Connections: ATM trams; ATM trolleybuses

Construction
- Structure type: Underground

Other information
- Fare zone: STIBM: Mi1
- Classification: Silver

History
- Opened: 21 December 1997; 28 years ago

Services
Preceding station	Trenord	Following station
Milano Bovisa towards Saronno	Line S1 (Milan suburban railway service)	Milano Porta Garibaldi towards Lodi
Milano Bovisa towards Mariano Comense	Line S2 (Milan suburban railway service)	Milano Porta Garibaldi towards Milano Rogoredo
Milano Villapizzone towards Varese	Line S5 (Milan suburban railway service)	Milano Porta Garibaldi towards Treviglio
Milano Villapizzone towards Novara	Line S6 (Milan suburban railway service)	Milano Porta Garibaldi towards Treviglio
Milano Bovisa towards Cormano–Cusano Milanino	Line S12 (Milan suburban railway service)	Milano Porta Garibaldi towards Melegnano
Milano Bovisa Terminus	Line S13 (Milan suburban railway service)	Milano Porta Garibaldi towards Pavia
Location
- Location within Milan Location within Lombardy Location within Northern Italy Location within Italy

Milano Lancetti is an underground railway station in Milan, Italy. It opened in 1997 as part of the Milan Passante railway, as its north-western gate. It is located on Viale Vincenzo Lancetti. The train services are operated by Trenord.

== Train services ==
The station is served by the following services:

- Milan Metropolitan services (S1) Saronno - Milan - Lodi
- Milan Metropolitan services (S2) Mariano Comense - Seveso - Milan
- Milan Metropolitan services (S5) Varese - Rho - Milan - Treviglio
- Milan Metropolitan services (S6) Novara - Rho - Milan - Treviglio
- Milan Metropolitan services (S12) Milan - Melegnano
- Milan Metropolitan services (S13) Milan - Pavia

== See also ==
- Railway stations in Milan
- Milan suburban railway network
- Milan Passante railway
