= Seveso =

Seveso Séves (Lombard)
- Comune
- Città di Seveso
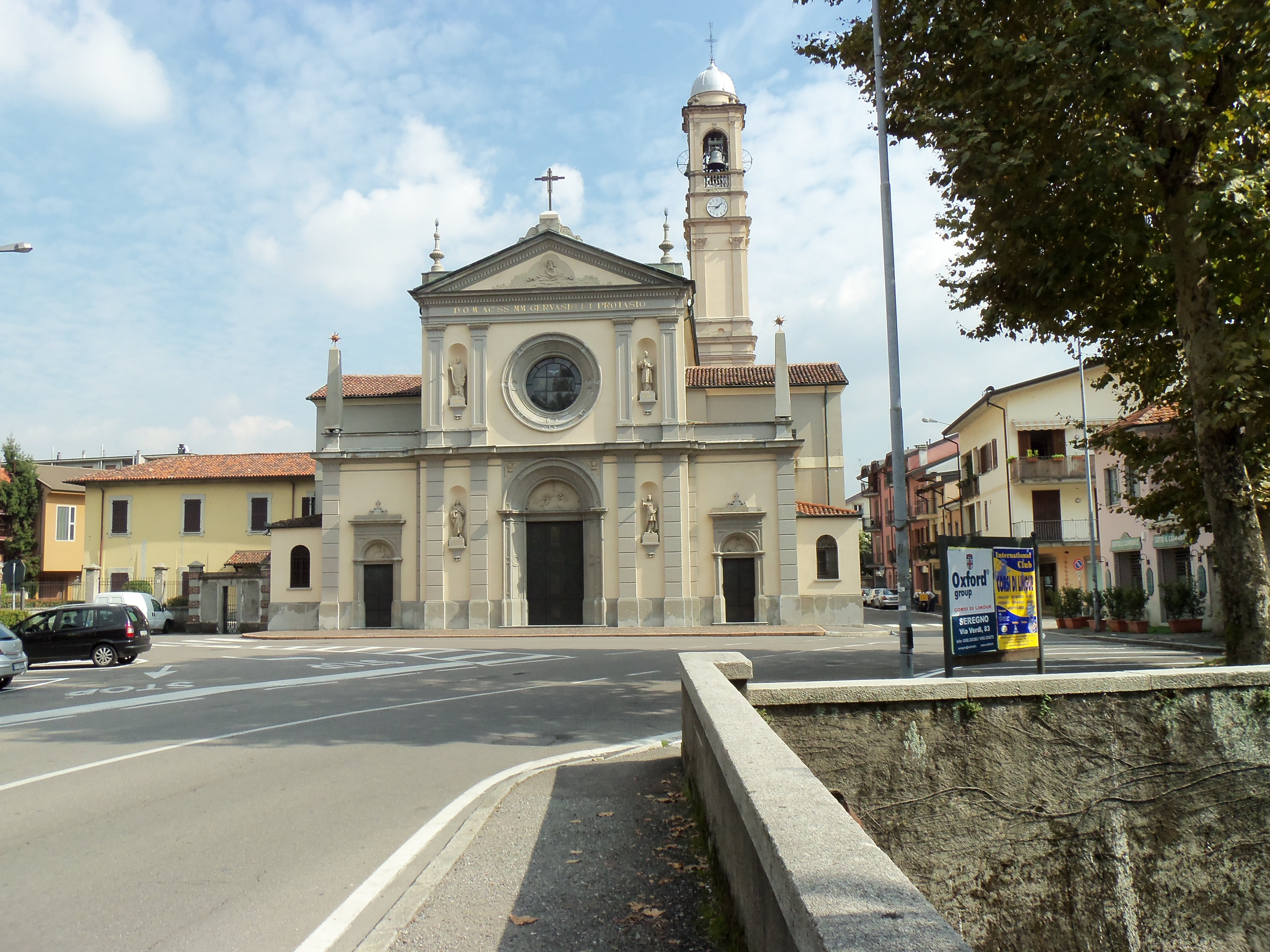

- Coat of arms

- Location within Italy Location within Lombardy
- Coordinates: 45°38′N 9°8′E
- Country: Italy
- Region: Lombardy
- Province: Monza and Brianza (MB)
- Frazioni: Baruccana, Altopiano and san pietro martire

Government
  - Mayor: alessia borroni

Area
  - Total: 7.4 km^{2} (2.9 sq mi)
- Elevation: 211 m (692 ft)

Population (31 December 2018)
  - Total: 23,456
  - Density: 3,200/km^{2} (8,200/sq mi)
- Demonym: Sevesini
- Time zone: UTC+1 (CET)
  - Summer (DST): UTC+2 (CEST)
- Postal code: 20822
- Dialing code: 0362
- Website: Official website

Seveso (Italian pronunciation: [ˈsɛːvezo]; Lombard: Séves [ˈseːʋes]) is a town and comune in the Province of Monza and Brianza, in the Region of Lombardy. The economy of the town has traditionally been based on the furniture industry.

Its name comes from the river of the same name which crosses the comune in a north-south direction.

Seveso received the honorary title of city with a presidential decree on 18 June 2003.

== Geography ==
The town is situated 21 kilometres (13 mi) to the north of Milan in the Brianza lowlands. The territory of the commune is highly urbanised, with the majority of inhabitants living in the town.

Seveso lies on the national trunk road Statale dei Giovi, which connects Milan to Como and on the Milan-Meda motorway. Seveso railway station is located on the Milan–Asso railway, while Seveso-Baruccana railway station is located on the Saronno–Seregno railway.

Neighbouring communes are Meda, Seregno, Barlassina, Cogliate, Cesano Maderno.

== History ==
Seveso's origins date back to about the 3rd century BC, when certain areas around Brianza were used as military staging posts for the Roman conquest of Gaul. Towards 780, the monastery at Meda was founded, the jurisdiction of which extended to the territory of Seveso.

In 1252 the church of Saint Peter Martyr (S. Pietro Martire) was constructed in homage to the Dominican order brother who had been assassinated in Seveso. The Church of the Seminary preserves in its crypt the knife which was used to kill him.

The town was struck in the 16th century by two episodes of famine and plague. During the 17th century, the town was ruled by several families, of which the Arese family left a number of outstanding monuments.

In 1798, Prince Giuseppe II of the Napoleonic Cisalpine Republic ordered the Dominicans to leave the monastery and church of Saint Peter. In the unification of the Kingdom of Italy, territory from Barlassina was passed to Seveso. This decision was rejected by the population and the two comuni were again separated in 1901.

=== Chemical disaster ===
Seveso made world headlines when, on 10 July 1976, storage vessels at the ICMESA chemical plant ruptured, releasing several kilograms of the dioxin TCDD (2,3,7,8-tetrachlorodibenzo-p-dioxin) into the atmosphere. Tens of thousands of farm animals and pets died or were later deliberately slaughtered, though it is believed that there was not a single human death directly attributable to the incident. The event came later to be known as the Seveso disaster, which later became the eponym for the European Commission's Seveso directive. Nowadays in the main contaminated area there is a park called "Bosco delle Querce" (Wood of Oaks).

== In popular culture ==
The track "Suffocation", in the 1980 album See You Later by Greek composer Vangelis, was inspired by the Seveso disaster. Another song, "Canzone per Seveso", in the 1976 album Ullàlla by Antonello Venditti, was written for Seveso.

== Notable people ==
- Walter Allievi, footballer
- Giovannangelo Porro, Roman Catholic priest and hermit

== See also ==
- Seveso disaster
