= Milan–Asso railway =

Regional railway linking Milan to Canzo-Asso

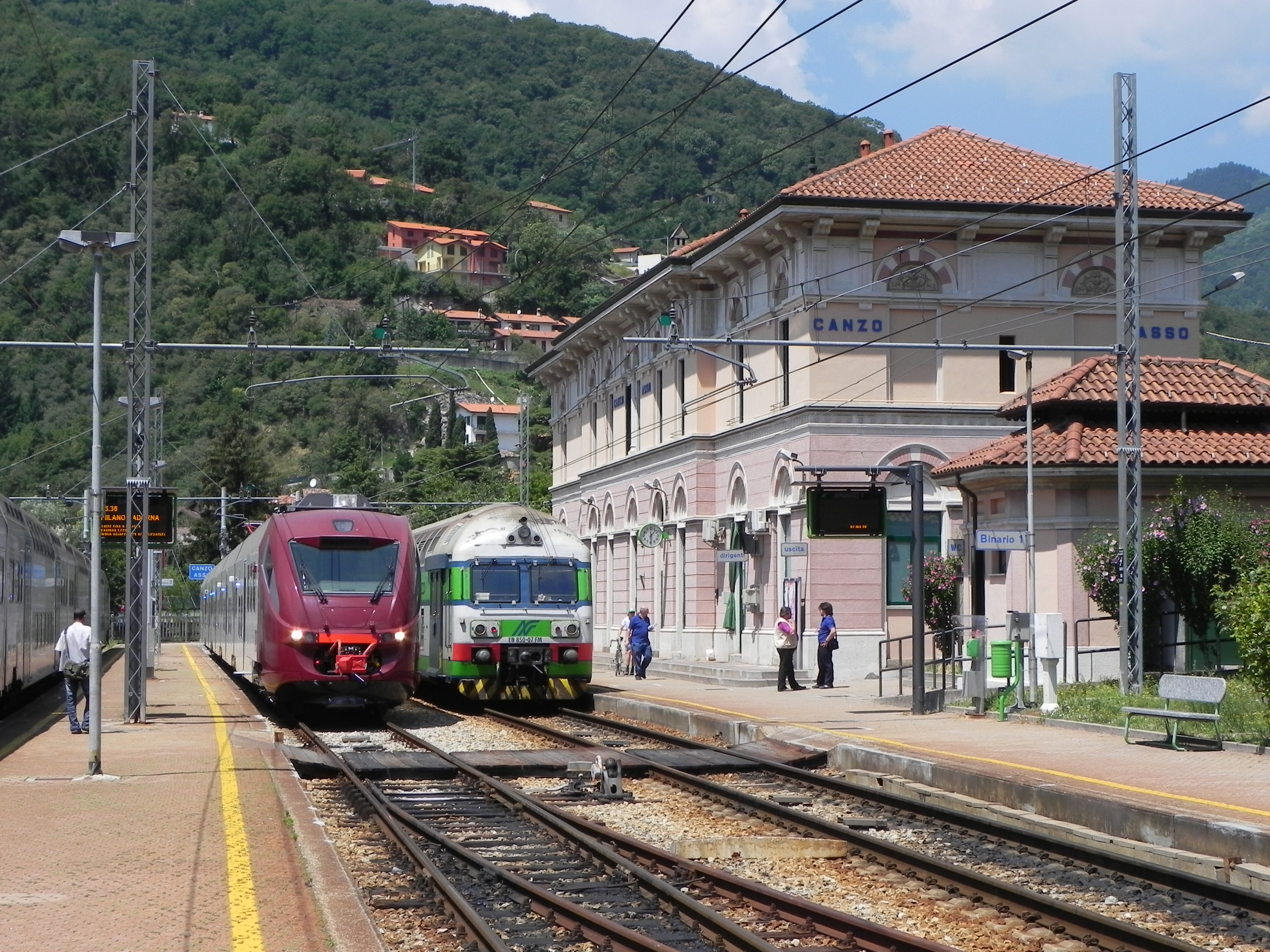
- Canzo-Asso terminus

Overview
- Native name: Ferrovia Milano-Asso
- Owner: Ferrovienord
- Locale: Lombardy
- Termini: Milan Cadorna station; Canzo-Asso railway station
- Stations: 26

Service
- Type: heavy rail
- Services: S2, S4, R16
- Operator(s): Trenord

History
- Opened: from 1879 to 1922

Technical
- Line length: 50 km (31 mi)
- Number of tracks: 4 or 3 or 2 or 1
- Track gauge: 1,435 mm (4 ft 8 1/2 in)
- Electrification: 3,000 V DC
- Operating speed: 90 km/h (56 mph)
- Highest elevation: 388 m (1,273 ft)

The Milan–Asso railway is a regional standard gauge railway line linking Milan to Canzo, with stops in Erba and other towns in Brianza. The northern terminal is Canzo-Asso, located in the commune of Canzo, but known as Asso, because there is another station on the line called Canzo and Canzo-Asso is next to the commune of Asso and serves the commune.

The management of the railway and of the stations is performed by FerrovieNord, until March 17, 2016.

The regional and suburban passenger service is provided by Trenord, under a service contract negotiated with Lombardy for the years 2009–2020.

== History ==
Section	Inauguration
Milan-Paderno Dugnano	July 16, 1879
Paderno Dugnano-Bovisio Masciago	August 14, 1879
Bovisio Masciago-Seveso	September 27, 1879
Seveso-Mariano Comense	October 18, 1879
Mariano Comense-Inverigo	November 22, 1879
Inverigo-Erba	December 31, 1879
Seveso-Camnago	June 20, 1880
Erba-Canzo/Asso	June 16, 1922

=== Project and construction ===
In 1877, the Belgian Albert Vaucamp, who obtained the permit for the Milan-Saronno railway, presented to the Ministry of Public Works a proposal for the construction of another railway, linking Erba to Milan, using the Milan Bovisa-Milan Cadorna line. The engineer Ambrogio Campiglio wrote a proposal to create a connection between the Saint Peter Martyr station of Seveso and Camnago station on the Milan-Chiasso line.

By royal decree of March 7, 1878 the grant to the Società Anonima Delle Ferrovie Milano-Saronno E Milano-Erba was approved, which in 1883 became Società Anonima Delle Ferrovie Nord Milano.

=== Beginning of the service ===
The railway line was officially inaugurated on December 31, 1879, although in the previous months sections were opened to traffic as they were completed and tested. On July 16 the section Milan Bovisa-Paderno Dugnano was opened, on August 14 trains could reach Bovisio Masciago-Mombello, on September 27 Seveso was linked. On October 18 the railway reached Mariano Comense and on November 22 Inverigo. On June 28 of the following year the section from Seveso to Camnago was opened. This section was linked to the Milan-Chiasso railway, shortening the track between Milan and Como by 6 kilometers, so the Società Anonima immediately ran trains between Milan Cadorna and Camnago to meet the trains running towards Como and Switzerland.

The section Milan Cadorna-Milan Bovisa was dual tracked at ground level. In 1887, Ferrovie Nord lowered the line into a trench where it crossed the old section between the old Central Station and the Milan Porta Genova. In 1895, the section to Milan Cadorna lowered into a trench.

In 1888, together with the Società Italiana per le strade ferrate meridionali, Ferrovie Nord Milano built a new station in Merone, named Merone-Ponte Nuovo station, to be used by the Como–Lecco railway. Consequently, the old Merone station was abandoned.

=== First part of twentieth century: strengthening of infrastructure ===
Despite the huge traffic registered since its opening, Milano–Erba was single tracked for many years. In 1909, the Milanese railway society requested dual tracking between Bovisa and Seveso, and a third rail between Bovisa and Affori. The request was granted four years later, on July 30, 1913, and approved on August 29, 1913. The First World War and other economic factors prompted Ferrovie Nord to delay the work until the second part of twenties. The second track between Bovisa and Varedo was inaugurated on February 16, 1928, the extension to Bovisio Masciago on March 30, and Seveso on May 8.

Even before the second track, the extension of the line to Canzo and Asso was completed. The First World War stopped work, which was restarted and completed after the end of the conflict. The railway was opened on June 16, 1922, and Erba-Incino station was abandoned, because a new station was built in the eastern part of the town. Meanwhile, because of difficulties in reaching Asso, the station of Canzo-Asso was opened in order to serve the neighboring comune and the Valassina.

Electrification, using 3000 Volt DC, of the line was approved on August 22, 1925, between Milano–Saronno and Milano–Meda and finished in 1928; the first studies of this project dating back to 1916.

The sections Meda–Canzo–Asso and Seveso–Camnago was worked by steam locomotives for many years. Trains which made ran the whole line changed locomotives in Seveso, because Meda didn't have a turntable. Ferrovie Nord planned to electrify the remaining sections in 1941, together with other railway lines which were not electrified. Without waiting for formal approval, works on the Seveso–Camnago section started on April 3, 1945. The Meda-Erba section was electrified until December 3, 1947, followed by Erba-Asso on January 20, 1948, always without formal approval by the Italian government.

=== Second part of twentieth century and today ===
In the following years, the line was included in many plans for the renewal of the track and railway signalling. In 1955, Seveso-Camnago spur was closed to passenger transport, with service provided by busses instead. In 1999, works to quadruple the section between Milan Cadorna and Milan Bovisa, completed eight years later. Since December 2004 the railway is used by two lines of the Milan suburban railway service, S2 and S4 and a new regional service. On February 19, 2006, the Seveso-Camnago section was reopened to the passengers transport.

Because of the Protocollo di intesa per la definizione degli interventi a completamento e adeguamento del sistema di trasporto su ferro per l'area della Brianza, some improvements were made between Milan and Asso, to improve security the offered service, such as the elimination of level crossings, modernization of some stations on the line, a third rail between Milan Affori and Varedo and the doubling of the section between Seveso and Mariano Comense.

In 2011, the new station Milan Affori was opened. It is further north than the previous structure and built to allow interchanges with Milan Metro Line 3.

== Technical detail ==
=== Right of way ===
The line standard gauge, electrified with 3000 Volt direct current. The common section with the Milano-Saronno railway, between Milan Cadorna and Milan Bovisa, is quadruple tracked. From Bovisa to Affori there are three tracks, two of them used by regional trains and one by suburban ones. The section Affori-Seveso is dual tracked. From Seveso to Canzo-Asso and the Seveso to Camnago spur are single tracks.

=== Train control system ===
The traffic on the section Seveso-Asso is supervised by the Dirigente Centrale Operativo (DCO) at Seveso. Since August 22, 2008, the DCO also supervises the section Bovisa-Seveso. Stations are staffed attended by railway attendants, who secure crossings and sell tickets.

== Traffic ==
Since December 12, 2004, the line is used by two services:

- Suburban service, S2 and S4 of the Milan suburban railway service.
- Regional service to Erba and Asso.

Suburban services stop at all stations in the Milan metropolitan area, with service every 30 minutes per direction per line and end at Mariano Comense, although the majority of trains only go as far as Seveso, as of 2024 on the S2. On the S4, service ends at Camnago-Lentate.

Since June 2024, the S12 runs from Cormano-Cusano Milanino to Melegnano with 11 round trips per weekday.
