= Meda, Lombardy =

Meda
- Comune
- Città di Meda
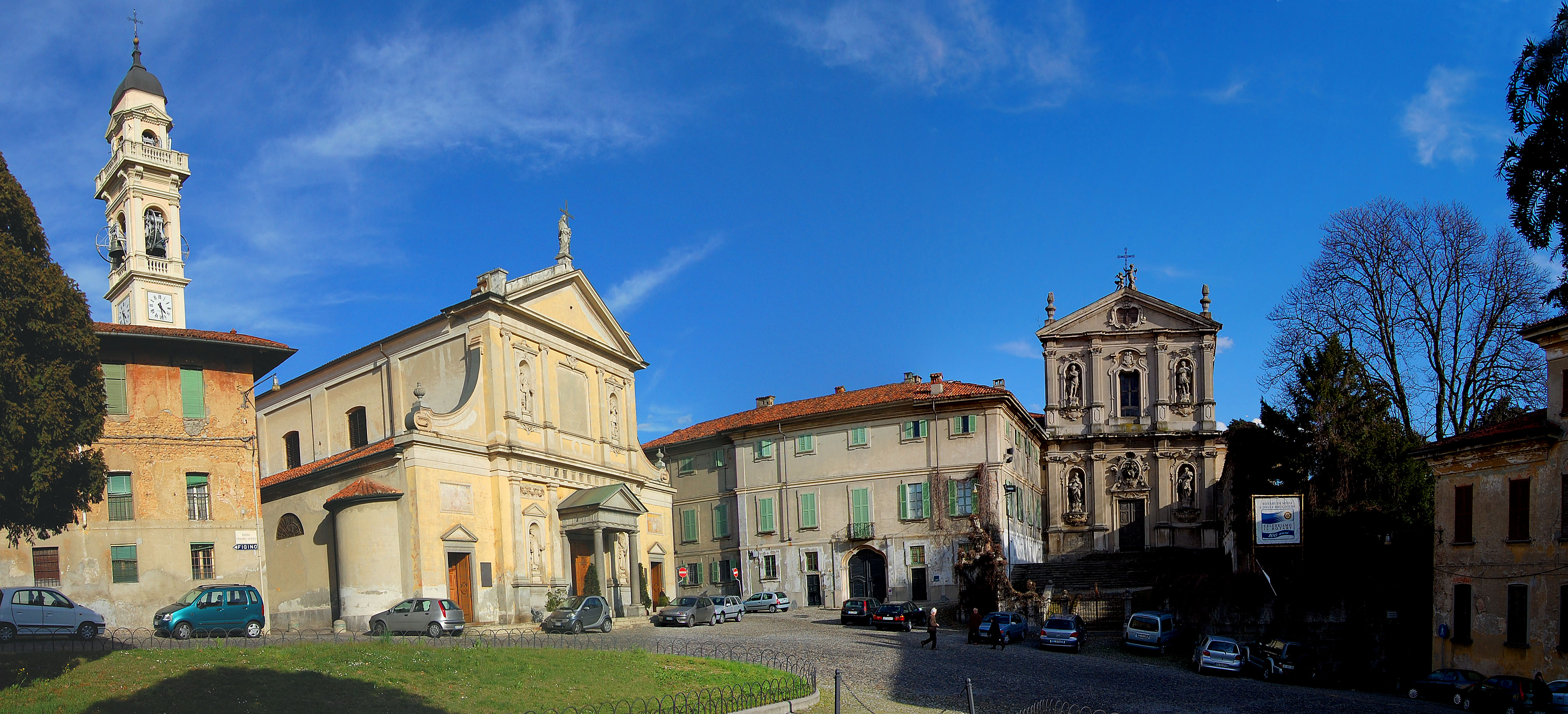

- Coat of arms

- Location within Italy Location within Lombardy
- Coordinates: 45°40′N 09°10′E
- Country: Italy
- Region: Lombardy
- Province: Monza and Brianza (MB)

Government
  - Mayor: Luca Santambrogio

Area
  - Total: 8.31 km^{2} (3.21 sq mi)
- Elevation: 221 m (725 ft)

Population (30 November 2017)
  - Total: 23,448
  - Density: 2,820/km^{2} (7,310/sq mi)
- Demonym: Medesi
- Time zone: UTC+1 (CET)
  - Summer (DST): UTC+2 (CEST)
- Postal code: 20821
- Dialing code: 0362
- Patron saint: Sts. Aimus and Vermundus
- Saint day: September 8
- Website: Official website

Meda is a town and comune in the province of Monza and Brianza, located in the northern Italian region of Lombardy, close to Milan and Como. It is known as a center of furniture production.

Meda is served by Meda railway station.

== History ==
Meda's history is linked to the history of its convent and of its foundation. From the latter's location on a mound (Latin: meta) stems the town's name.

According to legend, the Saints Aimo and Vermund, counts of Turbigo, were attacked by two wild boars while hunting. To save their lives, they swore to God that, if saved, they would build a convent right there. The convent was built around 780 near an old little church dedicated to St. Vittore. In order to be free from the control of the new priorate, the people of Meda built another church dedicated to St. Mary and St. Sebastian. The quarrels between the inhabitants and the convent ended on 10 December 1252, when the Prioress Maria da Besozzo gave up all her political, administrative and economic power on the village.

Later the municipal territory was held by the Visconti and Sforza families until, in the 16th century, it fell under the control of Spain and then of Napoleon. Meda later came under the power of the House of Habsburg and then, after the Second War of Italian Independence, became part of the Kingdom of Italy.

The Meda territory, on the border with the town of Seveso, was the location of the ICMESA factory, which became known in 1976 for the catastrophical release of a dioxin cloud, which affected many towns of the Brianza. This event is known as the “Seveso disaster” (Disastro di Seveso).

Meda received the honorary title of city with a presidential decree on 4 September 1998.

== Main sights ==
- Church of San Vittore (1520), housing a series of frescoes by Bernardino Luini and his school.
- Villa Antona Traversi, a transformation of a medieval convent of Santa Vittoria by the Neoclassical architect Leopoldo Pollack. The monastery had been suppressed in 1798 by the Napoleonic government. The church is frescoed by followers of Bernardo Luini.

== Notable people ==
- Giuseppe Terragni – architect
- Igor Cassina – gymnast – Gold medal at Athens 2004
- Johnny Dorelli – Actor
- St. Giovanni Oldrati from Meda
