= Mariano Comense =

Mariano Comense Marian
- Comune
- Città di Mariano Comense
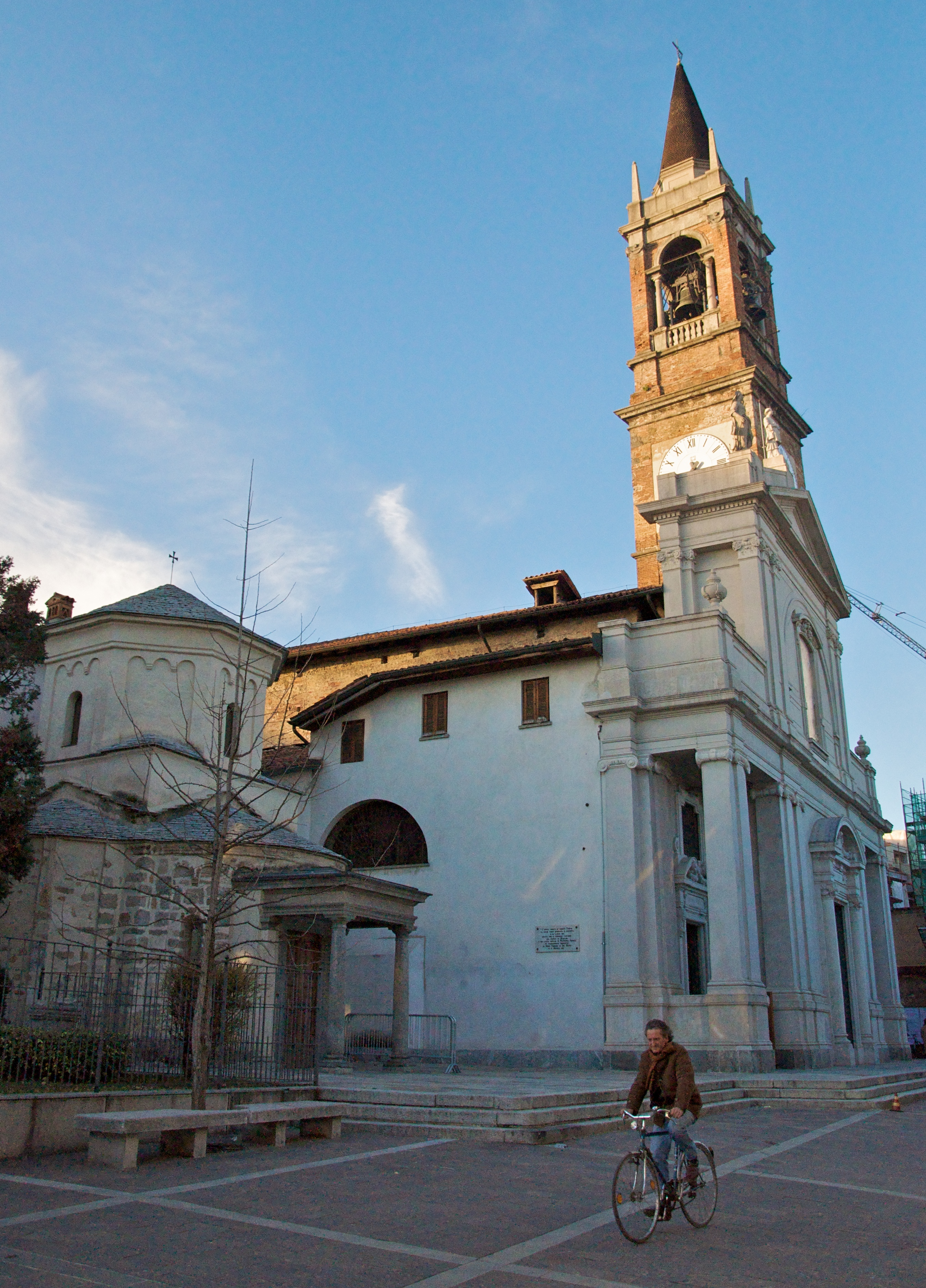
- Baptistery of St. John the Baptist (5th century) and church of St. Stephen (11th-16th centuries)

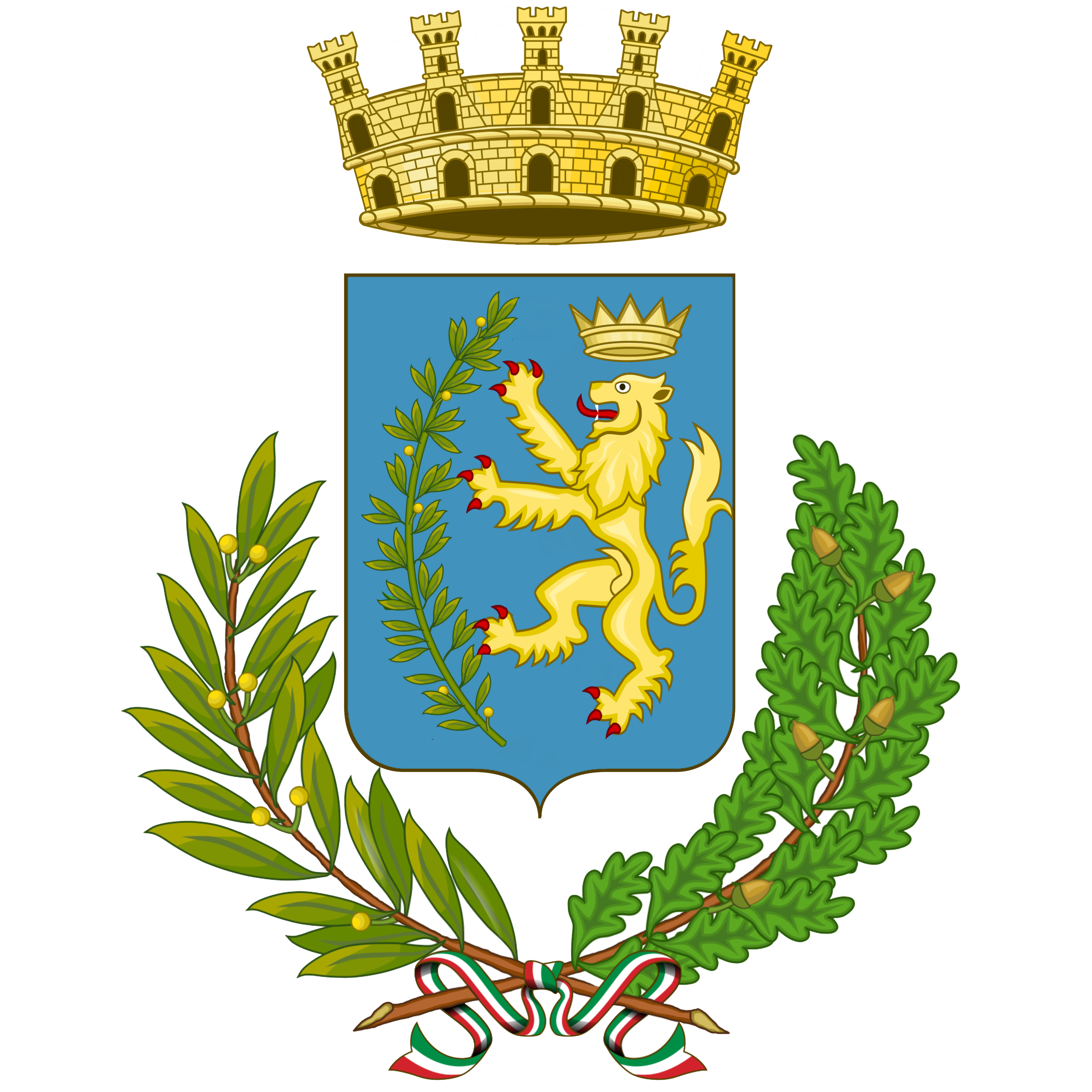
- Coat of arms

- Location of Mariano Comense in Italy Mariano Comense (Lombardy)
- Coordinates: 45°42′N 9°11′E
- Country: Italy
- Region: Lombardy
- Province: Como (CO)
- Frazioni: Perticato

Government
  - Mayor: Giovanni Alberti

Area
  - Total: 13.72 km^{2} (5.30 sq mi)
- Elevation: 250 m (820 ft)

Population (1 January 2025)
  - Total: 25,462
  - Density: 1,856/km^{2} (4,807/sq mi)
- Demonym: Marianesi
- Time zone: UTC+1 (CET)
  - Summer (DST): UTC+2 (CEST)
- Postal code: 22066
- Dialing code: 031
- ISTAT code: 013143
- Patron saint: St. Stephen
- Saint day: 3 August
- Website: Official website

Mariano Comense (Brianzöö: Marian [maˈrjãː]) is a town and comune in the province of Como, Lombardy, Italy. It has c. 23,600 inhabitants and is one of the most important cities of the Brianza. It received the honorary title of city with a presidential decree on February 29, 1996. It is served by Mariano Comense railway station.

== Main sights ==
- Church of Santo Stefano, of medieval origins but rebuilt in 1583
- Baptistery of San Giovanni Battista, in Romanesque style.
- Sanctuary of San Rocco

== Sports ==
Monnet Xenia Sport is an amateur football club based in Mariano Comense It competes in the Prima Categoria, Group B, for the 2024-2025 season. The principal football team of Mariano Comense is Mariano Calcio, which is competing in Eccellenza
