= Camnago–Lentate railway station =

Railway station in Italy

Camnago–Lentate
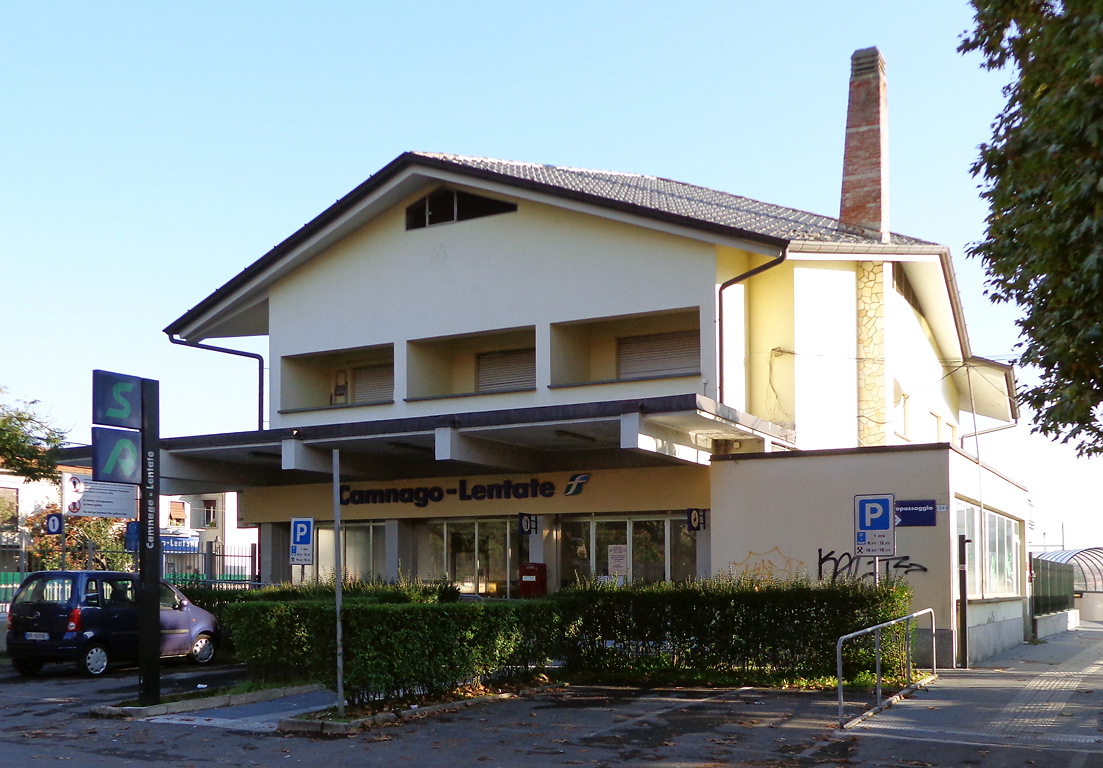

General information
- Location: Via XXIV Maggio, 24; Lentate sul Seveso, Monza and Brianza, Lombardy; Italy
- Coordinates: 45°40′06″N 09°08′01″E
- Operator: Rete Ferroviaria Italiana
- Lines: Milan–Chiasso; Seveso–Camnago
- Distance: 27.092 km (16.834 mi) from Milan Central; 23.553 km (14.635 mi) from Milan Cadorna
- Platforms: 2
- Tracks: 3
- Train operators: Trenord

Other information
- Fare zone: STIBM: Mi6
- Classification: Silver

History
- Opened: 1849; 177 years ago
- Electrified: 1939

Services
Preceding station	Trenord	Following station
Terminus	Line S4 (Milan suburban railway service)	Seveso towards Milano Cadorna
Carimate towards Rho	Line S11 (Milan suburban railway service)	Seregno towards Chiasso
Location
- Location within Lombardy Location within Northern Italy Location within Italy

Camnago–Lentate railway station is a railway station in Italy. Located on the Milan–Chiasso railway, and linked with a branch of the Milan–Asso railway, it serves the town of Lentate sul Seveso, and particularly its suburb Camnago.

== Services ==
Camnago–Lentate is served by lines S4 and S11 of the Milan suburban railway network, the former of which terminates here. Both of them are operated by the Lombard railway company Trenord.

== See also ==
- Milan suburban railway network
