= Asso =

Asso Ass (Lombard)
- Comune
- Comune di Asso
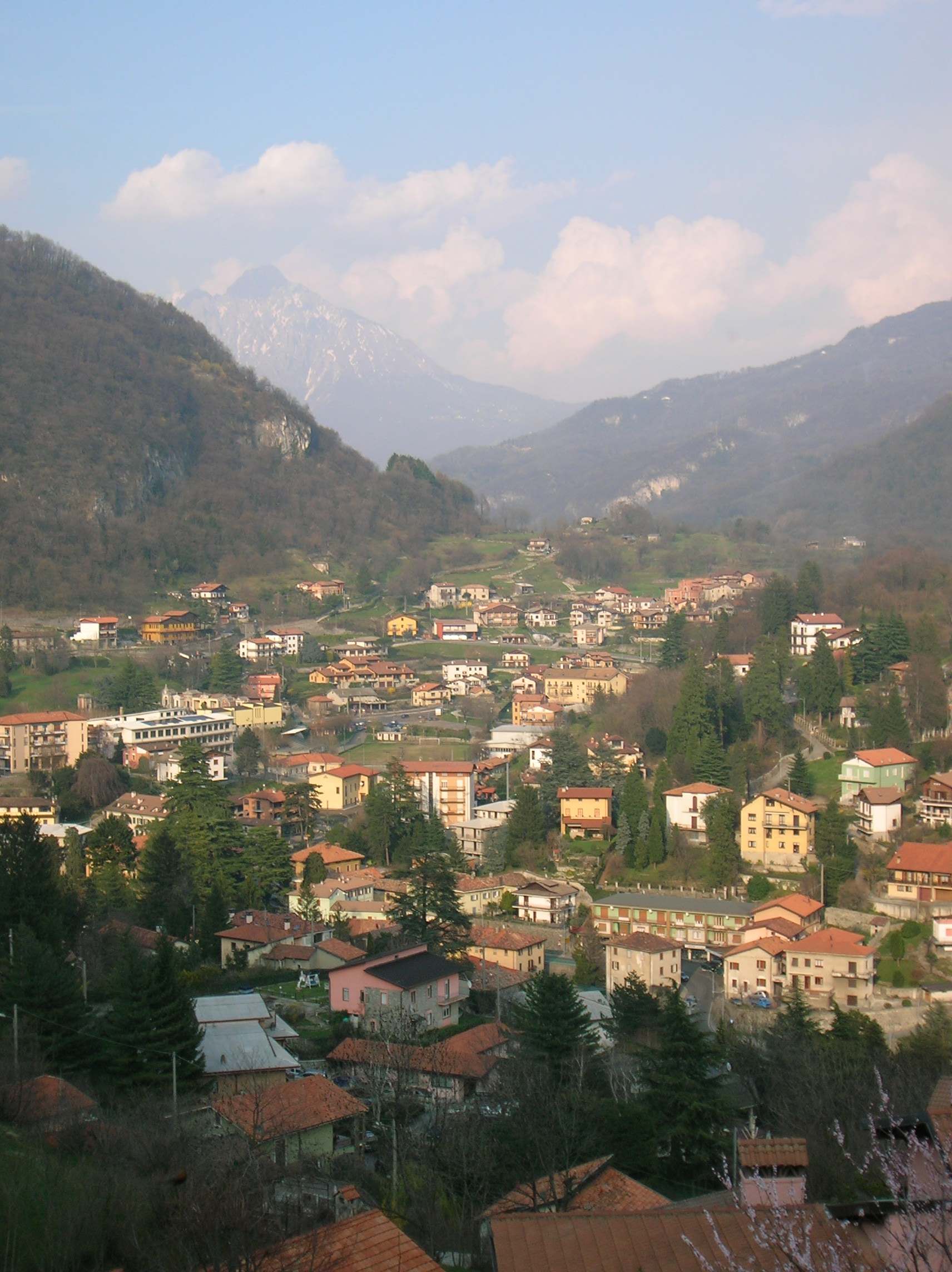
- View of Asso

- Coat of arms

- Location of Asso in Italy Asso (Lombardy)
- Coordinates: 45°52′N 9°16′E
- Country: Italy
- Region: Lombardy
- Province: Como (CO)
- Frazioni: Brazzova, Ca' Nova, Fraino, Gallegno, Gemù, Megna, Mudronno, Pagnano, Scarenna

Government
  - Mayor: Giovanni Conti (elected May 5, 2003)

Area
  - Total: 6.46 km^{2} (2.49 sq mi)
- Elevation: 427 m (1,401 ft)

Population (2006)
  - Total: 3,524
  - Density: 546/km^{2} (1,410/sq mi)
- Demonym(s): Assesi or assini (it.); assées (west.lmo.); spazapulée (west.lmo. traditional gentilic)
- Time zone: UTC+1 (CET)
  - Summer (DST): UTC+2 (CEST)
- Postal code: 22033
- Dialing code: 031
- Patron saint: Saint Apollonia
- Saint day: February 9

Asso (Valassinese Lombard: Ass) is an Italian comune in the province of Como, in Lombardy, Italy. It has 3,524 citizens and an area of 6.46 square kilometres (2.49 mi^{2}), with a density of 546 people per square kilometer (1,410 people/mi^{2}).

== Main sights ==
Significant historic buildings are:

- the castle, built in the 12th century; nowadays only the tower is in good condition;
- the main church of John the Baptist, built between 1641 and 1675;
- a few bridges on the river Lambro, including punt de la Fola, punt di Gubitt and ponte Oscuro.

== Sister towns ==
- Saint-Péray, France, since 2001
