= Mariano Comense railway station =

Railway station in Italy

Mariano Comense

General information
- Location: Piazza A. Diaz 3 Mariano Comense, Como, Lombardy; Italy
- Coordinates: 45°41′37″N 09°10′53″E
- Operator: Ferrovienord
- Line: Milan–Asso
- Platforms: 3
- Train operators: Trenord

History
- Opened: 18 October 1879; 146 years ago
- Electrified: 3 December 1947

Services
Preceding station	Trenord	Following station
Terminus	Line S2 (Milan suburban railway service)	Cabiate towards Milano Rogoredo
Location
- Location within Lombardy Location within Northern Italy Location within Italy

Mariano Comense railway station is a railway station in Italy. Located on the Milan–Asso railway, it serves the town of Mariano Comense.

== Services ==
Mariano Comense is terminus of a few trains of line S2 of the Milan suburban railway network, and served as well by the regional trains Milan–Asso. All this trains are operated by the lombard railway company Trenord.

== See also ==
- Milan suburban railway network
