= List of railway stations in Lombardy =

This is the list of the railway stations in Lombardy owned by:

- Rete Ferroviaria Italiana, a branch of the Italian state company Ferrovie dello Stato
- Ferrovienord
- Ferrovie Emilia Romagna (FER).

== RFI stations ==
Station	Locality	Province	Category
Abbadia Lariana	Abbadia Lariana	Lecco	Bronze
Abbiategrasso	Abbiategrasso	Milan	Silver
Acquanegra Cremonese	Acquanegra Cremonese	Cremona	Bronze
Airuno	Airuno	Lecco	Silver
Albairate-Vermezzo	Albairate	Milan	Silver
Albano Sant'Alessandro	Albano Sant'Alessandro	Bergamo	Bronze
Albate-Camerlata	Como	Como	Bronze
Albate-Trecallo	Como	Como	Bronze
Albizzate-Solbiate Arno	Albizzate	Varese	Silver
Albuzzano	Albuzzano	Pavia	Bronze
Ambivere-Mapello	Ambivere	Bergamo	Silver
Anzano del Parco	Anzano del Parco	Como	Bronze
Arcene	Arcene	Bergamo	Silver
Arcisate	Arcisate	Varese	Silver
Arcore	Arcore	Monza and Brianza	Silver
Ardenno-Masino	Ardenno	Sondrio	Bronze
Arena Po	Arena Po	Pavia	Bronze
Asola	Asola	Mantua	Bronze
Bagnolo Mella	Bagnolo Mella	Brescia	Bronze
Barbianello	Barbianello	Pavia	Bronze
Belgioioso	Belgioioso	Pavia	Bronze
Bellano-Tartavalle Terme	Bellano	Lecco	Silver
Bergamo	Bergamo	Bergamo	Gold
Besana	Besana in Brianza	Monza and Brianza	Silver
Besnate	Besnate	Varese	Bronze
Besozzo	Besozzo	Varese	Bronze
Bianzone	Bianzone	Sondrio	Bronze
Biassono-Lesmo Parco	Biassono	Monza and Brianza	Bronze
Bisuschio-Viggiù	Bisuschio	Varese	Silver
Borgoforte	Borgoforte	Mantua	Bronze
Borgolombardo	Borgolombardo	Milan	Bronze
Bozzolo	Bozzolo	Mantua	Bronze
Brenna-Alzate	Brenna	Como	Bronze
Brescia	Brescia	Brescia	Gold
Bressana Argine	Bressana Bottarone	Pavia	Bronze
Bressana Bottarone	Bressana Bottarone	Pavia	Silver
Broni	Broni	Pavia	Silver
Busto Arsizio	Busto Arsizio	Varese	Silver
Buttafava	Arcore (Ca' Bianca)	Monza and Brianza	Bronze
Caldè	Castelveccana	Varese	Bronze
Calolziocorte-Olginate	Calolziocorte	Lecco	Silver
Calusco	Calusco d'Adda	Bergamo	Silver
Calvisano	Calvisano	Brescia	Bronze
Camnago-Lentate	Lentate sul Seveso	Milan	Silver
Candia Lomellina	Candia Lomellina	Pavia	Bronze
Canegrate	Canegrate	Milan	Silver
Canneto sull'Oglio	Canneto sull'Oglio	Mantua	Bronze
Cantù	Cantù	Como	Bronze
Cantù-Cermenate	Cantù	Como	Silver
Capralba	Capralba	Cremona	Silver
Capriolo	Capriolo	Brescia	Bronze
Carate-Calò	Carate Brianza	Monza and Brianza	Bronze
Caravaggio	Caravaggio	Bergamo	Silver
Carimate	Carimate	Como	Silver
Carnate-Usmate	Carnate	Monza and Brianza	Silver
Casalbuttano	Casalbuttano	Cremona	Bronze
Casaletto Vaprio	Casaletto Vaprio	Cremona	Bronze
Casalmaggiore	Casalmaggiore	Cremona	Silver
Casalpusterlengo	Casalpusterlengo	Lodi	Silver
Casletto-Rogeno	Rogeno	Lecco	Bronze
Casorate Sempione	Casorate Sempione	Varese	Bronze
Cassago-Nibionno-Bulciago	Cassago Brianza	Lecco	Bronze
Cassano d'Adda	Cassano d'Adda	Milan	Silver
Casteggio	Casteggio	Pavia	Bronze
Castel d'Ario	Castel d'Ario	Mantua	Bronze
Castelleone	Castelleone	Cremona	Silver
Castellucchio	Castellucchio	Mantua	Bronze
Castione Andevenno	Castione Andevenno	Sondrio	Bronze
Castronno	Castronno	Varese	Silver
Cava-Carbonara	Cava Manara	Pavia	Bronze
Cava Tigozzi	Cavatigozzi	Cremona	Bronze
Cavaria-Oggiona-Ierago	Cavaria	Varese	Silver
Cernusco-Merate	Cernusco Lombardone	Lecco	Silver
Certosa di Pavia	Certosa di Pavia	Pavia	Silver
Cesano Boscone	Cesano Boscone	Milan	Silver
Chiari	Chiari	Brescia	Silver
Chiavenna	Chiavenna	Sondrio	Silver
Chignolo Po	Chignolo Po	Pavia	Bronze
Chiuduno	Chiuduno	Bergamo	Bronze
Chiuro	Chiuro	Sondrio	Bronze
Cisano-Caprino Bergamasco	Cisano Bergamasco	Bergamo	Silver
Civate	Civate	Lecco	Bronze
Cividate al Piano-Calcio	Cividate al Piano	Bergamo	Bronze
Coccaglio	Coccaglio	Brescia	Silver
Codogno	Codogno	Lodi	Silver
Colico	Colico	Lecco	Silver
Cologne	Cologne	Brescia	Bronze
Como San Giovanni	Como	Como	Gold
Corbetta-Santo Stefano Ticino	Corbetta	Milan	Silver
Corsico	Corsico	Milan	Silver
Corteolona	Corteolona	Pavia	Bronze
Cosio-Traona	Cosio Valtellino	Sondrio	Bronze
Costa Masnaga	Costa Masnaga	Lecco	Bronze
Cozzo	Cozzo	Pavia	Bronze
Crema	Crema	Cremona	Silver
Cremona	Cremona	Cremona	Gold
Cucciago	Cucciago	Como	Bronze
Delebio	Delebio	Sondrio	Bronze
Dervio	Dervio	Lecco	Bronze
Desenzano del Garda-Sirmione	Desenzano del Garda	Brescia	Gold
Desio	Desio	Monza and Brianza	Silver
Dorio	Dorio	Lecco	Bronze
Dubino	Dubino	Sondrio	Bronze
Ferrera Lomellina	Ferrera Erbognone	Pavia	Bronze
Fiumelatte	Fiumelatte	Lecco	Bronze
Gaggiano	Gaggiano	Milan	Silver
Gallarate	Gallarate	Varese	Gold
Gambolò-Remondò	Gambolò	Pavia	Bronze
Garlasco	Garlasco	Pavia	Bronze
Gazzada-Schianno-Morazzone	Gazzada Schianno	Varese	Silver
Gazzo di Bigarello	Gazzo di Bigarello	Mantua	Bronze
Gazzo-Pieve San Giacomo	Pieve San Giacomo	Cremona	Bronze
Ghedi	Ghedi	Brescia	Bronze
Gonzaga-Reggiolo	Gonzaga	Mantua	Bronze
Gropello Cairoli	Gropello Cairoli	Pavia	Bronze
Grumello del Monte	Grumello del Monte	Bergamo	Silver
Induno Olona	Induno Olona	Varese	Silver
Ispra	Ispra	Varese	Bronze
Lambrinia	Lambrinia	Pavia	Bronze
Laveno-Mombello	Laveno	Varese	Silver
Lecco	Lecco	Lecco	Gold
Lecco Maggianico	Lecco	Lecco	Silver
Leggiuno-Monvalle	Leggiuno	Varese	Bronze
Legnano	Legnano	Milan	Silver
Lesmo	Lesmo	Monza and Brianza	Bronze
Levata	Curtatone	Mantua	Bronze
Levate	Levate	Bergamo	Silver
Lierna	Lierna	Lecco	Bronze
Lissone-Muggiò	Lissone	Monza and Brianza	Silver
Locate Triulzi	Locate di Triulzi	Milan	Silver
Lodi	Lodi	Lodi	Gold
Lomello	Lomello	Pavia	Bronze
Lonato	Lonato	Brescia	Bronze
Luino	Luino	Varese	Silver
Lungavilla	Lungavilla	Pavia	Silver
Macherio-Canonica	Macherio	Monza and Brianza	Bronze
Macherio-Sovico	Macherio	Monza and Brianza	Bronze
Madignano	Madignano	Cremona	Bronze
Magenta	Magenta	Milan	Silver
Maleo	Maleo	Lodi	Bronze
Mandello del Lario	Mandello del Lario	Lecco	Silver
Manerbio	Manerbio	Brescia	Silver
Mantua	Mantua	Mantua	Gold
Mantova Frassine	Mantua	Mantua	Bronze
Marcaria	Marcaria	Mantua	Bronze
Mede	Mede	Pavia	Bronze
Melegnano	Melegnano	Milan	Silver
Melzo	Melzo	Milan	Silver
Merone	Merone	Como	Bronze
Milano Cadorna	Milan	Milan	Gold
Milano Centrale	Milan	Milan	Platinum
Milano Certosa	Milan	Milan	Silver
Milano Dateo	Milan	Milan	Silver
Milano Greco Pirelli	Milan	Milan	Gold
Milano Lambrate	Milan	Milan	Gold
Milano Lancetti	Milan	Milan	Silver
Milano Porta Garibaldi	Milan	Milan	Platinum
Milano Porta Genova	Milan	Milan	Silver
Milano Porta Romana	Milan	Milan	Silver
Milano Porta Venezia	Milan	Milan	Silver
Milano Porta Vittoria	Milan	Milan	Silver
Milano Repubblica	Milan	Milan	Silver
Milano Rogoredo	Milan	Milan	Gold
Milano Romolo	Milan	Milan	Silver
Milano San Cristoforo	Milan	Milan	Silver
Milano Tibaldi	Milan	Milan	Silver
Milano Villapizzone	Milan	Milan	Silver
Miradolo Terme	Miradolo Terme	Pavia	Bronze
Moiana	Moiana	Como	Bronze
Molteno	Molteno	Lecco	Silver
Montello-Gorlago	Montello	Bergamo	Silver
Montirone	Montirone	Brescia	Bronze
Monza	Monza	Monza and Brianza	Gold
Monza Sobborghi	Monza	Monza and Brianza	Bronze
Morbegno	Morbegno	Sondrio	Silver
Morengo-Bariano	Bariano	Bergamo	Silver
Mornago-Cimbro	Mornago	Varese	Bronze
Mortara	Mortara	Pavia	Silver
Motta San Damiano	Motta San Damiano	Pavia	Bronze
Nicorvo	Nicorvo	Pavia	Bronze
Novate Mezzola	Novate Mezzola	Sondrio	Bronze
Oggiono	Oggiono	Lecco	Silver
Olcio	Olcio	Lecco	Bronze
Olevano	Olevano	Pavia	Bronze
Olgiate-Calco-Brivio	Olgiate Molgora	Lecco	Silver
Olmeneta	Olmeneta	Cremona	Bronze
Orio Litta	Orio Litta	Lodi	Bronze
Osnago	Osnago	Lecco	Bronze
Ospedaletto Lodigiano	Ospedaletto Lodigiano	Lodi	Bronze
Ospitaletto Mantovano	Ospitaletto Mantovano	Mantua	Bronze
Ospitaletto-Travagliato	Ospitaletto	Brescia	Silver
Ostiglia	Ostiglia	Mantua	Bronze
Paderno-Robbiate	Paderno d'Adda	Lecco	Bronze
Palazzolo sull'Oglio	Palazzolo sull'Oglio	Brescia	Silver
Palestro	Palestro	Pavia	Bronze
Palidano	Palidano	Mantua	Bronze
Parabiago	Parabiago	Milan	Silver
Paratico	Paratico	Brescia	Bronze
Parona Lomellina	Parona	Pavia	Silver
Pavia	Pavia	Pavia	Gold
Pavia Porta Garibaldi	Pavia	Pavia	Bronze
Piadena	Piadena	Cremona	Silver
Pieve Albignola	Pieve Albignola	Pavia	Bronze
Pieve Emanuele	Pieve Emanuele	Milan	?
Pinarolo Po	Pinarolo Po	Pavia	Bronze
Pioltello-Limito	Pioltello	Milan	Silver
Piona	Piona	Lecco	Bronze
Pizzighettone	Pizzighettone	Cremona	Bronze
Poggio Rusco	Poggio Rusco	Mantua	Silver
Poggiridenti-Tresivio-Piateda	Poggiridenti	Sondrio	Bronze
Ponte d'Adda	Pizzighettone	Cremona	Bronze
Ponte in Valtellina	Ponte in Valtellina	Sondrio	Bronze
Ponte San Marco-Calcinato	Calcinato	Brescia	Bronze
Ponte San Pietro	Ponte San Pietro	Bergamo	Silver
Pontida	Pontida	Bergamo	Bronze
Porto Ceresio	Porto Ceresio	Varese	Silver
Porto Valtravaglia	Porto Valtravaglia	Varese	Bronze
Pozzuolo Martesana	Pozzuolo Martesana	Milan	Silver
Prata Camportaccio	Prata Camportaccio	Sondrio	Bronze
Pregnana Milanese	Pregnana Milanese	Milan	Silver
Remedello Sopra	Remedello	Brescia	Bronze
Remedello Sotto	Remedello	Brescia	Bronze
Renate-Veduggio	Renate	Monza and Brianza	Bronze
Rho	Rho	Milan	Silver
Rho Fiera	Rho	Milan	Silver
Robbio	Robbio	Pavia	Silver
Robecco-Pontevico	Robecco d'Oglio	Cremona	Bronze
Romano	Romano di Lombardia	Bergamo	Silver
Romanore	Romanore	Mantua	Bronze
Rovato	Rovato	Brescia	Silver
Roverbella	Roverbella	Mantua	Bronze
Sant'Antonio Mantovano	Porto Mantovano	Mantua	Bronze
San Cassiano Valchiavenna	San Cassiano Valchiavenna	Sondrio	Bronze
Santa Cristina e Bissone	Santa Cristina e Bissone	Pavia	Bronze
San Donato Milanese	San Donato Milanese	Milan	Bronze
San Giacomo di Teglio	San Giacomo di Teglio	Sondrio	Bronze
San Giovanni in Croce	San Giovanni in Croce	Cremona	Bronze
Santa Giuletta	Santa Giuletta	Pavia	Bronze
San Giuliano Milanese	San Giuliano Milanese	Milan	Silver
San Martino Siccomario-Cava Manara	San Martino Siccomario	Pavia	Silver
San Michele in Bosco	San Michele in Bosco	Mantua	Bronze
San Pietro Berbenno	San Pietro Berbenno	Sondrio	Bronze
Santo Stefano Lodigiano	Santo Stefano Lodigiano	Lodi	Bronze
San Zeno-Folzano	San Zeno Naviglio	Brescia	Bronze
San Zenone al Lambro	San Zenone al Lambro	Milan	Silver
Sairano	Sairano	Pavia	Bronze
Sairano-Zinasco	Zinasco	Pavia	Bronze
Sala al Barro-Galbiate	Galbiate	Lecco	Bronze
Samolaco	Samolaco	Sondrio	Bronze
Sangiano	Sangiano	Varese	Bronze
Sannazzaro	Sannazzaro de' Burgondi	Pavia	Silver
Sartirana	Sartirana Lomellina	Pavia	Bronze
Secugnago	Secugnago	Lodi	Silver
Segrate	Segrate	Milan	Silver
Seregno	Seregno	Monza and Brianza	Silver
Seriate	Seriate	Bergamo	Silver
Sesto Calende	Sesto Calende	Varese	Silver
Sesto San Giovanni	Sesto San Giovanni	Milan	Silver
Somma Lombardo	Somma Lombardo	Varese	Silver
Sondrio	Sondrio	Sondrio	Gold
Soresina	Soresina	Cremona	Silver
Stezzano	Stezzano	Bergamo	Silver
Stradella	Stradella	Pavia	Silver
Suzzara	Suzzara	Mantua	Silver
Taino-Angera	Taino	Varese	Bronze
Talamona	Talamona	Sondrio	Bronze
Tavazzano	Tavazzano	Lodi	Silver
Ternate-Varano Borghi	Ternate	Varese	Bronze
Terno	Terno d'Isola	Bergamo	Silver
Tirano	Tirano	Sondrio	Silver
Torre de' Picenardi	Torre de' Picenardi	Cremona	Bronze
Torreberetti	Torre Beretti	Pavia	Bronze
Travedona-Biandronno	Travedona	Varese	Bronze
Trecella	Trecella	Milan	Silver
Tresenda-Aprica-Teglio	Teglio	Sondrio	Bronze
Treviglio	Treviglio	Bergamo	Gold
Treviglio Ovest	Treviglio	Bergamo	Silver
Trezzano sul Naviglio	Trezzano sul Naviglio	Milan	Silver
Triuggio-Ponte Albiate	Triuggio	Monza and Brianza	Silver
Tromello	Tromello	Pavia	Bronze
Valle Lomellina	Valle Lomellina	Pavia	Bronze
Valmadrera	Valmadrera	Lecco	Bronze
Vanzago-Pogliano	Vanzago	Milan	Silver
Varenna-Esino-Perledo	Perledo	Lecco	Silver
Varese	Varese	Varese	Gold
Verceia	Verceia	Sondrio	Bronze
Vercurago-San Girolamo	Vercurago	Lecco	Bronze
Verdello-Dalmine	Verdello	Bergamo	Silver
Vergiate	Vergiate	Varese	Silver
Verolanuova	Verolanuova	Brescia	Silver
Viadana Bresciana	Viadana Bresciana	Brescia	Bronze
Vidalengo	Vidalengo	Bergamo	Bronze
Vigevano	Vigevano	Pavia	Silver
Vignate	Vignate	Milan	Silver
Villa di Tirano	Villa di Tirano	Sondrio	Bronze
Villa Raverio	Villa Raverio	Monza and Brianza	Silver
Villamaggiore	Villamaggiore	Milan	Silver
Villanova d'Ardenghi	Villanova d'Ardenghi	Pavia	Bronze
Villasanta Parco	Villasanta	Monza and Brianza	Silver
Villetta Malagnino	Malagnino	Cremona	Bronze
Visano	Visano	Brescia	Bronze
Vittuone-Arluno	Vittuone	Milan	Silver
Voghera	Voghera	Pavia	Gold
Zinasco Nuovo	Zinasco	Pavia	Bronze

== Ferrovienord stations ==
Station	Locality	Province
Arosio	Arosio	Como
Barasso-Comerio	Barasso	Varese
Bollate Centro	Bollate	Milan
Bollate Nord	Bollate	Milan
Bovisio Masciago-Mombello	Bovisio-Masciago	Monza and Brianza
Busto Arsizio Nord	Busto Arsizio	Varese
Cabiate	Cabiate	Como
Cadorago	Cadorago	Como
Canzo	Canzo	Como
Canzo-Asso	Canzo	Como
Caronno Pertusella	Caronno Pertusella	Varese
Carugo-Giussano	Carugo	Como
Caslino al Piano	Cadorago	Como
Caslino d'Erba	Caslino d'Erba	Como
Castano Primo	Castano Primo	Milan
Castellanza	Castellanza	Varese
Ceriano Laghetto-Groane	Ceriano Laghetto	Monza and Brianza
Ceriano Laghetto-Solaro	Ceriano Laghetto	Monza and Brianza
Cesano Maderno	Cesano Maderno	Monza and Brianza
Cesano Maderno-Groane	Cesano Maderno	Monza and Brianza
Cesate	Cesate	Milan
Cislago	Cislago	Varese
Cittiglio	Cittiglio	Varese
Cocquio-Trevisago	Cocquio-Trevisago	Varese
Como Borghi	Como	Como
Como Camerlata	Como	Como
Como Lago	Como	Como
Cormano-Cusano Milanino	Cormano	Milan
Erba	Erba	Como
Ferno-Lonate Pozzolo	Ferno	Milan
Fino Mornasco	Fino Mornasco	Como
Garbagnate Parco delle Groane	Garbagnate Milanese	Milan
Garbagnate Milanese	Garbagnate Milanese	Milan
Gavirate	Gavirate	Varese
Gavirate Verbano	Gavirate	Varese
Gemonio	Gemonio	Varese
Gerenzano-Turate	Gerenzano	Varese
Grandate-Breccia	Grandate	Como
Inverigo	Inverigo	Como
Lambrugo-Lurago	Lambrugo	Como
Laveno Mombello Nord	Laveno-Mombello	Varese
Lido di Turbigo	Turbigo	Milan
Locate Varesino-Carbonate	Locate Varesino	Como
Lomazzo	Lomazzo	Como
Malnate	Malnate	Varese
Malpensa Aeroporto Terminal 1	Milan-Malpensa Airport	Varese
Malpensa Aeroporto Terminal 2	Milan-Malpensa Airport	Varese
Mariano Comense	Mariano Comense	Como
Meda	Meda	Monza and Brianza
Merone	Merone	Como
Milano Affori	Milan	Milan
Milano Bovisa	Milan	Milan
Milano Bruzzano	Milan	Milan
Milano Cadorna	Milan	Milan
Milano Domodossola	Milan	Milan
Milano Quarto Oggiaro	Milan	Milan
Morosolo-Casciago	Casciago	Varese
Mozzate	Mozzate	Como
Novate Milanese	Novate Milanese	Milan
Paderno Dugnano	Paderno Dugnano	Milan
Palazzolo Milanese	Paderno Dugnano	Milan
Pontelambro-Castelmarte	Ponte Lambro	Como
Portichetto-Luisago	Luisago	Como
Rescaldina	Rescaldina	Milan
Rovellasca-Manera	Rovellasca	Como
Rovello Porro	Rovello Porro	Como
Saronno	Saronno	Varese
Saronno Sud	Saronno	Varese
Seveso	Seveso	Monza and Brianza
Seveso-Baruccana	Seveso	Monza and Brianza
Tradate	Tradate	Varese
Tradate-Abbiate Guazzone	Tradate	Varese
Turbigo	Turbigo	Milan
Vanzaghello-Magnago	Vanzaghello	Milan
Varedo	Varedo	Monza and Brianza
Varese Casbeno	Varese	Varese
Varese Nord	Varese	Varese
Vedano Olona	Vedano Olona	Varese
Venegono Inferiore	Venegono Inferiore	Varese
Venegono Superiore-Castiglione	Venegono Superiore	Varese

== FER stations ==
Station	Locality	Province
Felonica Po	Felonica	Mantova
Magnacavallo	Magnacavallo	Mantova
Pegognaga	Pegognaga	Mantova
Quistello	Quistello	Mantova
San Benedetto Po	San Benedetto Po	Mantova
San Rocco Mantovano	Quistello	Mantova
Schivenoglia	Schivenoglia	Mantova
Sermide	Sermide	Mantova
Vallazza-Carbonara di Po	Magnacavallo	Mantova

== See also ==
- Railway stations in Italy
- Ferrovie dello Stato
- Rail transport in Italy
- High-speed rail in Italy
- Transport in Italy
