= Line S5 (Milan suburban railway service) =

Suburban railway line in Milan, Italy

Varese–Milano Passante–Treviglio
- S5
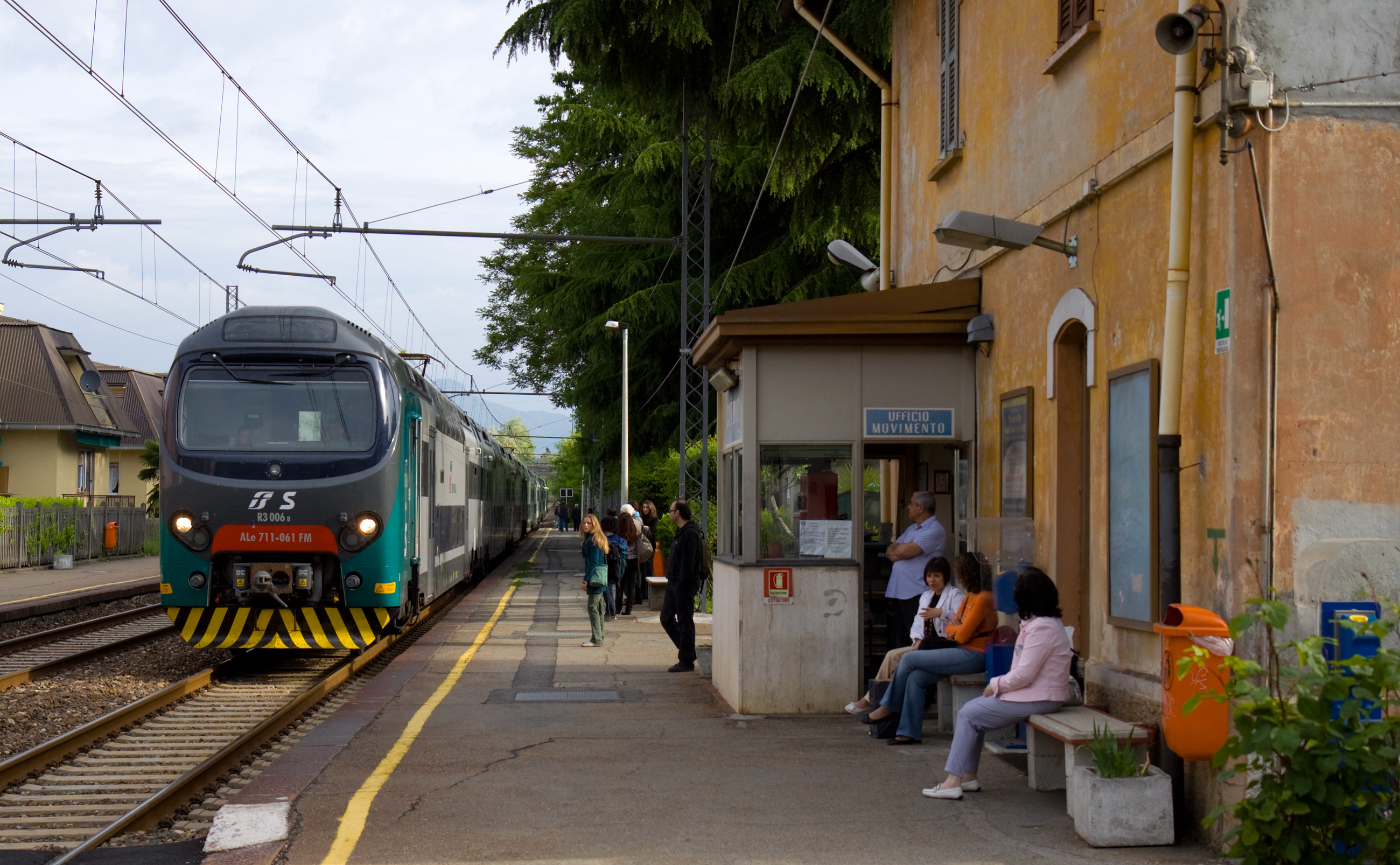
- An S5 train at Castronno.

Overview
- Status: Operational
- Locale: Milan, Italy
- Termini: Varese; Treviglio
- Stations: 30
- Website: Trenord (in Italian)

Service
- Type: Commuter rail
- System: Milan suburban railway service
- Route number: S5
- Operator(s): Trenord
- Rolling stock: Treno Servizio Regionale

History
- Opened: 2004

Technical
- Line length: 93 km (58 mi)
- Track gauge: 1,435 mm (4 ft 8 1/2 in)
- Electrification: 3,000 V DC
Route map
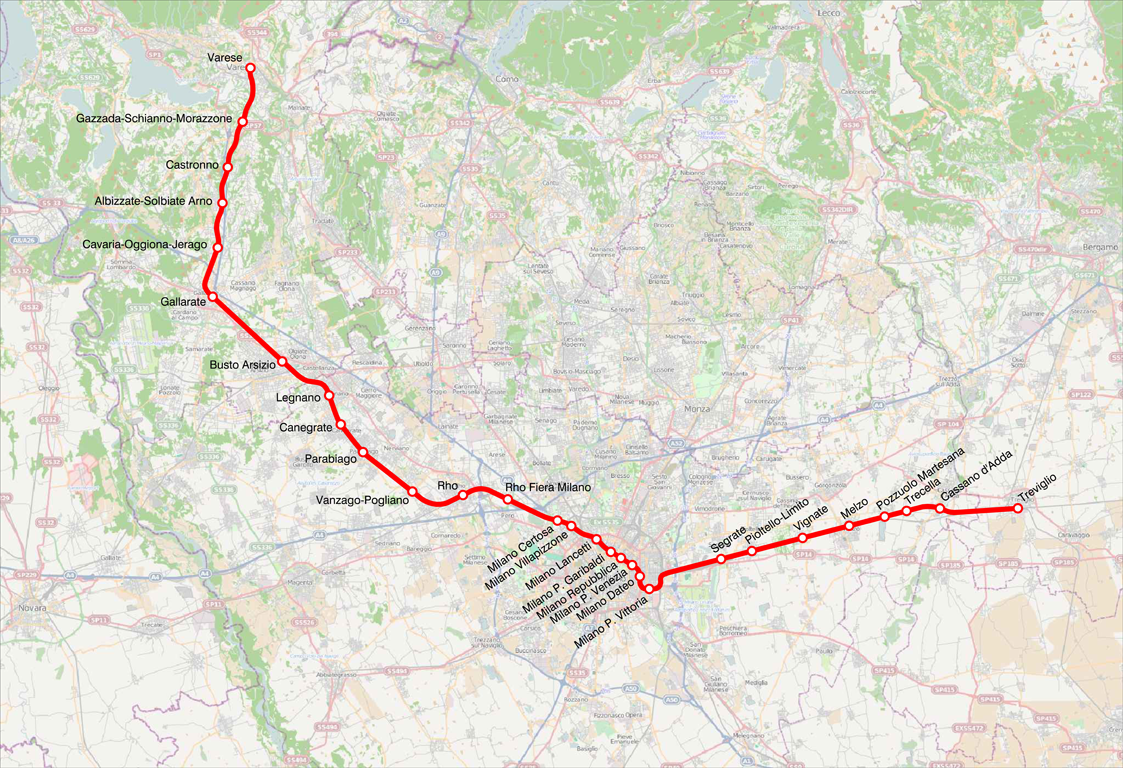
Map of line S5.

The S5 is a commuter railway route forming part of the Milan suburban railway service (Italian: Servizio ferroviario suburbano di Milano), which converges on the city of Milan, Italy.

The route runs over the infrastructure of the Porto Ceresio–Milan, Milan Passante and Milan–Venice railways.

The line is operated by Trenord.

== Route ==
- Varese ↔ Milano Passante ↔ Treviglio

Line S5, a cross-city route, heads initially in a southerly direction from Varese to Gallarate, and then southeasterly to Rho. From there, the line runs through the municipality of Milan, via the Milan Passante railway, to Milano Porta Vittoria, and finally in an easterly direction to Treviglio. The complete journey takes 2 hours and 7 minutes.

== History ==
The S5 was activated on 12 December 2004, and operated initially between Varese and Pioltello-Limito. At that time, its operator was Trenitalia, under a two-year service contract with the region of Lombardy.

On 1 July 2008, responsibility for operating the line passed to a joint venture comprising Trenitalia, FNM and ATM. The joint venturers had won a tender that had been launched by the region in 2004, and had pledged to provide free transport of bicycles on public holidays. On the same date, 15 new TSR trains began to enter service. The regional administration had committed itself to offering these trains to the successful tenderer.

On the occasion of the timetable change on 13 December 2009, the line was extended from Pioltello-Limito to Treviglio.

In May 2011, as a result of the merger between the regional passenger division of Trenitalia and the FNM subsidiary LeNORD, the merged entity, Trenord, took over the two railway companies' roles in the joint venture.

== Stations ==
The stations on the S5 are as follows (stations with blue background are in the municipality of Milan):

Station	Interchange	Note
Varese	S40 S50	Varese Nord within 100 m
Gazzada-Schianno-Morazzone		
Castronno		
Albizzate-Solbiate Arno		
Cavaria-Oggiona-Jerago		
Gallarate	S30 S50	
Busto Arsizio	S50	
Legnano		
Canegrate		
Parabiago		
Vanzago-Pogliano		
Rho	Line S11 Treni regionali	
Rho Fiera	Line M1 Line S11 Treni regionali	
Milano Certosa	Line S11	
Milano Villapizzone	Line S11	
Milano Lancetti	Line S12 Line S13	
Milano Porta Garibaldi	MXP	
Milano Repubblica	Line M3 Line S12 Line S13	
Milano Porta Venezia	Line M1 Line S12 Line S13	
Milano Dateo	Line S12 Line S13	
Milano Porta Vittoria	Line S12 Line S13	
Milano Forlanini	Milan Metro Line 4 Line S6 (Milan suburban railway service) Line S9 (Milan suburban railway service)	
Segrate	Line S6 (Milan suburban railway service)	
Pioltello-Limito	Treni regionali	
Vignate	Line S6 (Milan suburban railway service)	
Melzo	Line S6 (Milan suburban railway service)	
Pozzuolo Martesana	Line S6 (Milan suburban railway service)	
Trecella	Line S6 (Milan suburban railway service)	
Cassano d'Adda	Line S6 (Milan suburban railway service)	
Treviglio	Treni regionali	

== Rolling stock ==
S5 trains are made up of a 3-car Treno Servizio Regionale (TSR) combined with a 5-car TSR, except on Saturdays and Sundays, when 3-car TSRs are used on some trains, and 5-car TSRs operate the remaining, more heavily patronised services.

== Scheduling ==
As of 2012, S5 trains ran every half-hour between 06:00 and 00:30 daily. Between 09:00 and 11:00, and between 21:00 and 00:30, some S5 services operated only between Gallarate and Treviglio.

== See also ==
- History of rail transport in Italy
- List of Milan suburban railway stations
- Rail transport in Italy
- Transport in Milan
