= Parabiago railway station =

Railway station in Italy

Parabiago
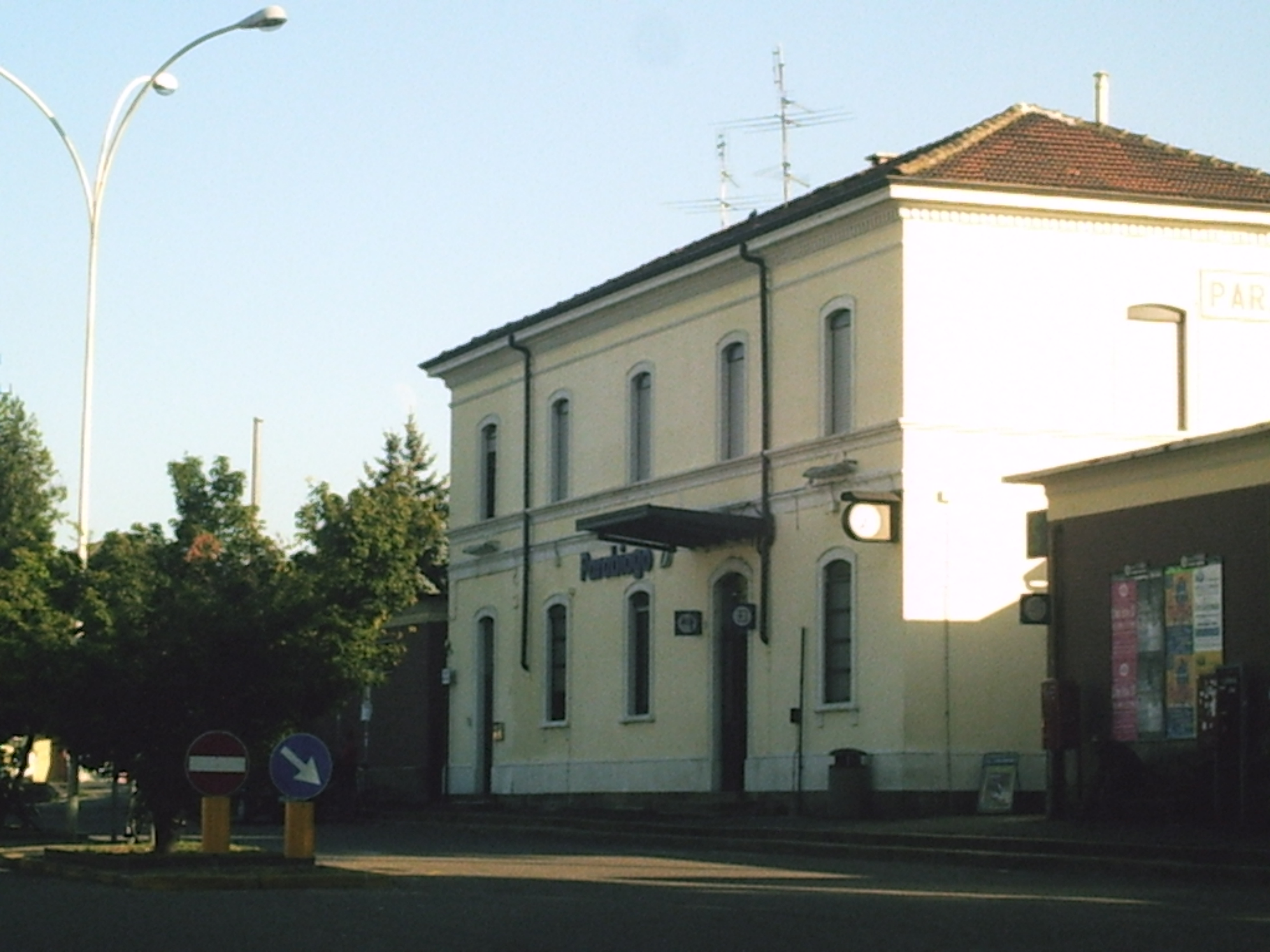

General information
- Location: Piazzale della Stazione; Parabiago, Milan, Lombardy; Italy
- Coordinates: 45.5526°N 8.9465°E
- Operator: Rete Ferroviaria Italiana
- Lines: Domodossola–Milan; Luino–Milan; Porto Ceresio–Milan
- Distance: 12.80 km (7.95 mi) from Rho Fiera EXPO Milano 2015 and 20 km (12 mi) from Milano Porta Garibaldi Railway Station
- Platforms: 3
- Tracks: 2
- Train operators: Trenord

Other information
- Fare zone: STIBM: Mi6
- Classification: Silver

History
- Opened: 1860; 166 years ago

Services
Preceding station	Trenord	Following station
Canegrate towards Varese	Line S5 (Milan suburban railway service)	Vanzago–Pogliano towards Treviglio
Location
- Location within Lombardy Location within Northern Italy Location within Italy

Parabiago is a railway station in Italy. Located on the common section of the Domodossola–Milan, Luino–Milan and Porto Ceresio–Milan lines, it serves the city of Parabiago.

== Services ==
Parabiago is served by line S5 of the Milan suburban railway network, operated by the Lombard railway company Trenord.

== See also ==
- Milan suburban railway network
