= Legnano railway station =

Railway station in Italy

Legnano
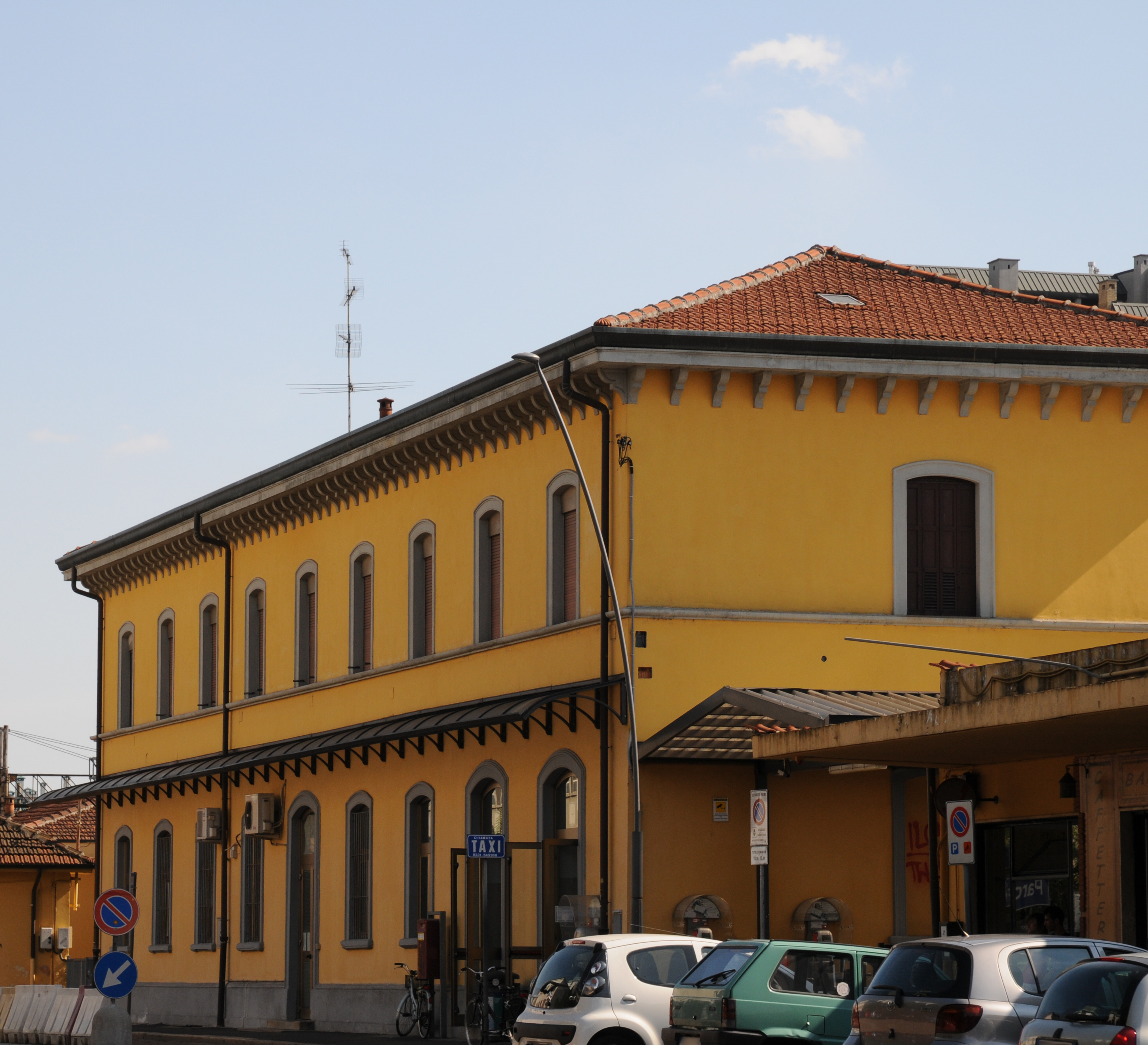

General information
- Location: Piazza Butti; Legnano, Milan, Lombardy; Italy
- Coordinates: 45°35′37″N 08°54′39″E
- Operator: Rete Ferroviaria Italiana
- Lines: Domodossola–Milan; Luino–Milan; Porto Ceresio–Milan
- Distance: 13.253 km (8.235 mi) from Rho
- Platforms: 2
- Tracks: 2
- Train operators: Trenord

Other information
- Fare zone: STIBM: Mi7
- Classification: Silver

History
- Opened: 20 December 1860; 165 years ago
- Electrified: 14 October 1901

Services
Preceding station	Trenord	Following station
Busto Arsizio towards Varese	Line S5 (Milan suburban railway service)	Canegrate towards Treviglio
Location
- Location within Lombardy Location within Northern Italy Location within Italy

Legnano is a railway station in Italy. Located on the common section of the Domodossola–Milan, Luino–Milan and Porto Ceresio–Milan lines, it serves the town of Legnano.

== Services ==
Legnano is served by line S5 of the Milan suburban railway network, and by the Milan–Varese regional line, both operated by the Lombard railway company Trenord.

== See also ==
- Milan suburban railway network
