= Canegrate railway station =

Railway station in Italy

Canegrate
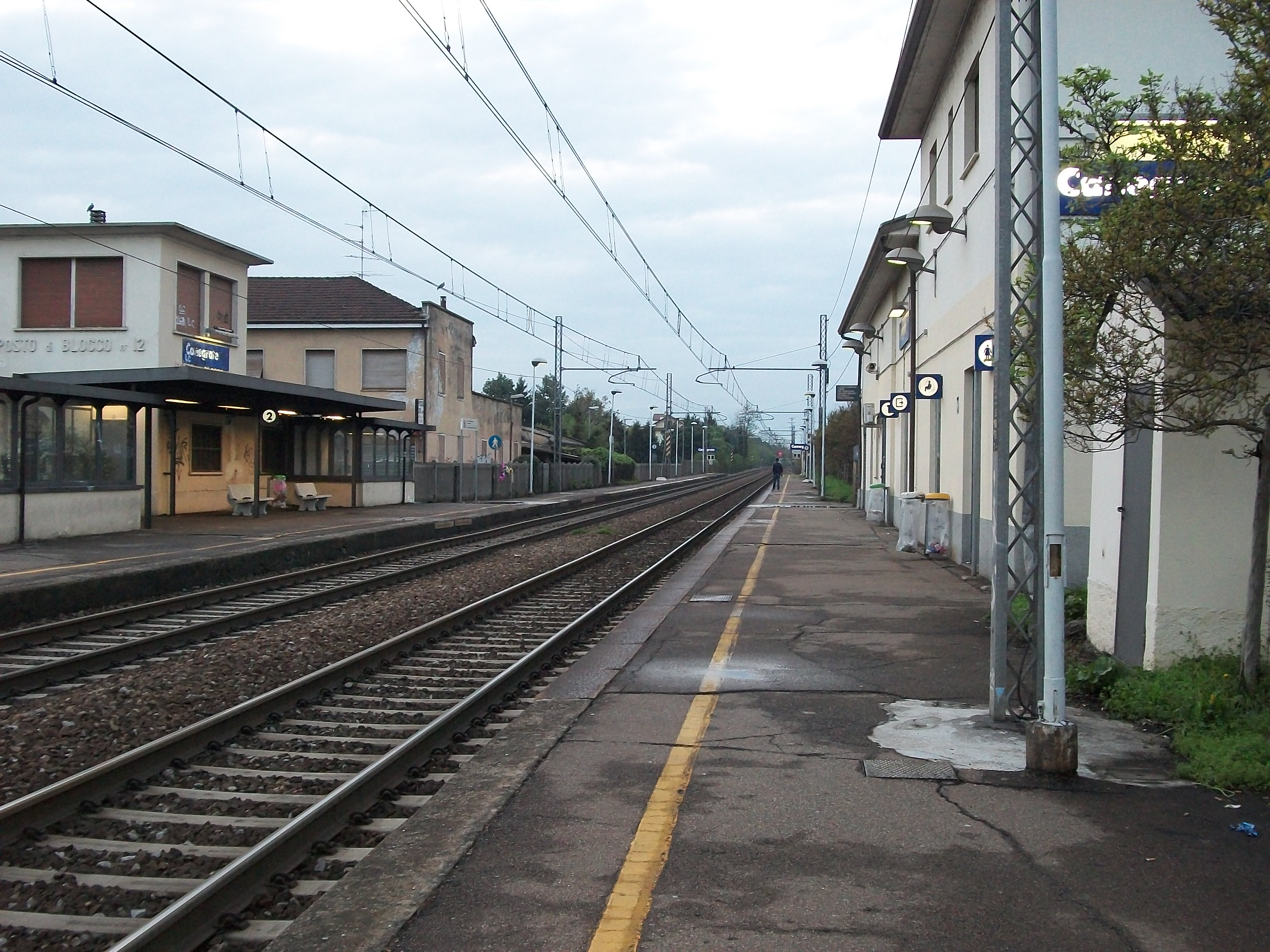

General information
- Location: Canegrate, Milan, Lombardy; Italy
- Coordinates: 45°34′10″N 8°55′36″E
- Operator: Rete Ferroviaria Italiana
- Lines: Domodossola–Milan; Luino–Milan; Porto Ceresio–Milan
- Distance: 10.253 km (6.371 mi) from Rho
- Platforms: 2
- Tracks: 2
- Train operators: Trenord

Other information
- Fare zone: STIBM: Mi7
- Classification: Bronze

History
- Opened: 1901; 125 years ago

Services
Preceding station	Trenord	Following station
Legnano towards Varese	Line S5 (Milan suburban railway service)	Parabiago towards Treviglio
Location
- Location within Lombardy Location within Northern Italy Location within Italy

Canegrate is a railway station in Italy. Located on the common section of the Domodossola–Milan, Luino–Milan and Porto Ceresio–Milan lines, it serves the town of Canegrate.

== Services ==
Canegrate is served by line S5 of the Milan suburban railway network, operated by the Lombard railway company Trenord.

== See also ==
- Milan suburban railway network
