= Vanzago–Pogliano railway station =

Railway station in Italy

Vanzago–Pogliano

General information
- Location: Pogliano Milanese border Vanzago, Milan, Lombardy; Italy
- Coordinates: 45°31′32″N 8°59′45″E
- Operator: Rete Ferroviaria Italiana
- Lines: Domodossola–Milan; Luino–Milan; Porto Ceresio–Milan
- Distance: 2.935 km (1.824 mi) from Rho
- Platforms: 2
- Tracks: 2
- Train operators: Trenord

Other information
- Fare zone: STIBM: Mi5
- Classification: Bronze

History
- Opened: 1884; 142 years ago

Services
Preceding station	Trenord	Following station
Parabiago towards Varese	Line S5 (Milan suburban railway service)	Rho towards Treviglio
Location
- Location within Lombardy Location within Northern Italy Location within Italy

Vanzago–Pogliano is a railway station in Italy. Located on the common section of the Domodossola–Milan, Luino–Milan and Porto Ceresio–Milan lines, it serves the town of Vanzago.

== Services ==
Vanzago–Pogliano is served by line S5 of the Milan suburban railway network, operated by the Lombard railway company Trenord.

== See also ==
- Milan suburban railway network
