= Busto Arsizio railway station =

Railway station in Busto Arsizio

Busto Arsizio
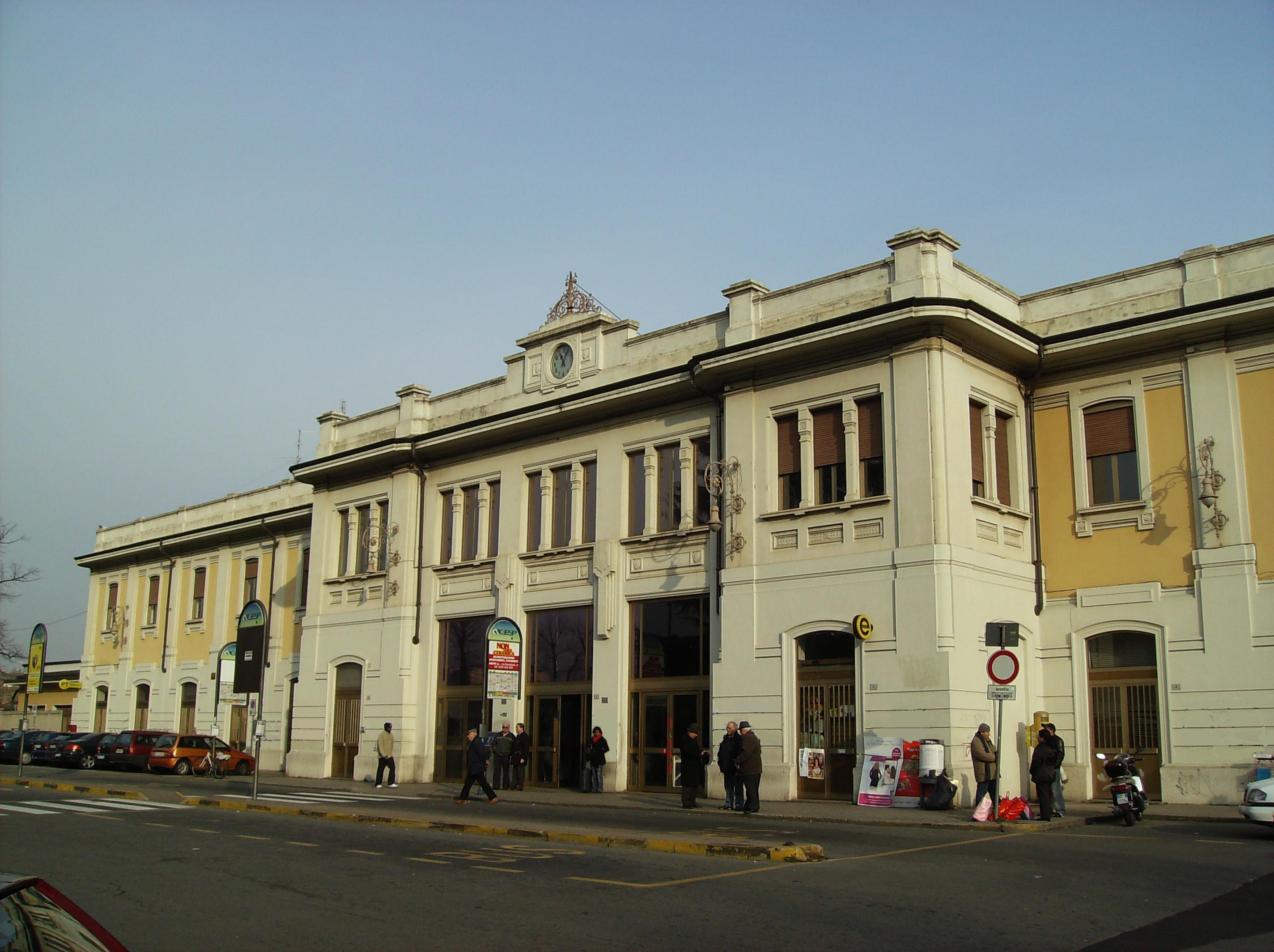

General information
- Location: Piazza Volontari della Libertà 5 Busto Arsizio, Lombardy; Italy
- Coordinates: 45°36′58″N 08°51′54″E
- Operator: Rete Ferroviaria Italiana
- Lines: Domodossola–Milan; Luino–Milan; Porto Ceresio–Milan
- Distance: 17.821 km (11.073 mi) from Rho
- Tracks: 6
- Train operators: TILO; Trenitalia; Trenord

Other information
- Classification: silver

History
- Opened: 26 October 1924; 101 years ago

Services
Preceding station	Trenord	Following station
Gallarate towards Varese	Line S5 (Milan suburban railway service)	Legnano towards Treviglio
Preceding station	TiLo	Following station
Gallarate towards Airolo	S50	Busto Arsizio Nord towards Malpensa Aeroporto Terminal 2
Location
- Location within Lombardy Location within Northern Italy Location within Italy

Busto Arsizio is a railway station in Italy. Located on the common section of the lines Domodossola–Milan, Luino–Milan and Porto Ceresio–Milan, it serves the city of Busto Arsizio. It is joined by a junction track to the Busto Arsizio Nord railway station, managed by Ferrovienord.

== Services ==
The station is served by the line S5 of the Milan suburban railway network and by the regional lines Milan–Domodossola and Milan–Varese, operated by Trenord and Trenitalia. It is also served by the line S50 of the Ticino rapid transit network, operated by TILO.

== See also ==
- Milan suburban railway network
