= Pozzuolo =

Pozzuolo can refer to various places in Italy:

- Pozzuolo del Friuli, comune in Friuli-Venezia Giulia, Italy
  - Battle of Pozzuolo del Friuli
  - Cavalry Brigade "Pozzuolo del Friuli"
- Pozzuolo Martesana, comune in Lombardy, Italy
  - Pozzuolo Martesana railway station
- Pozzuolo Umbro, a frazione of the comune of Castiglione del Lago in central Italy

== People with the surname ==
- Gabriella Pozzuolo (born 1946), Italian gymnast

== See also ==
- Pozzuoli
