= Rho, Lombardy =

Rho Rò (Lombard)
- Comune
- Città di Rho
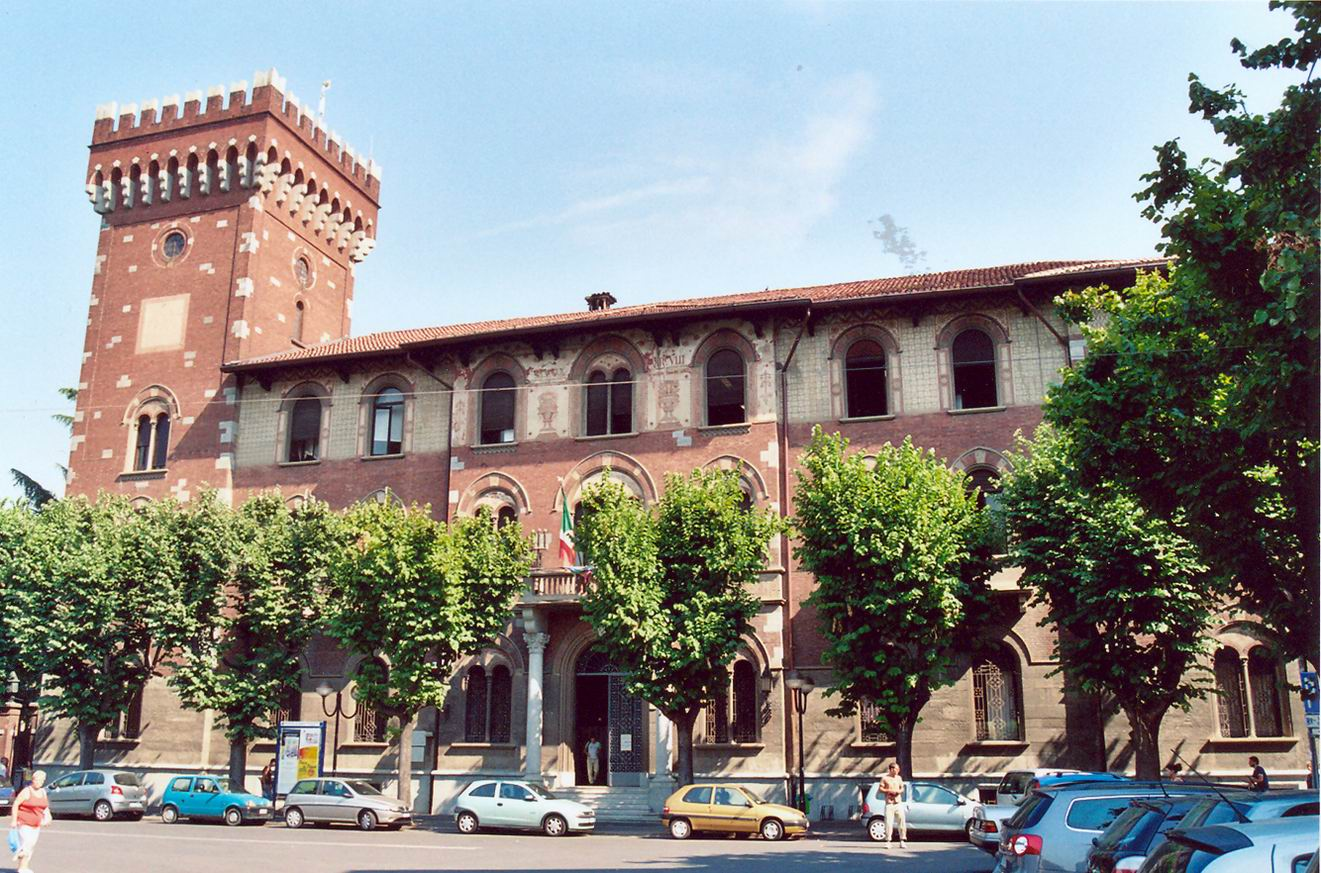
- The town hall

- Flag Coat of arms

- Location within Italy Location within Lombardy
- Coordinates: 45°31′52″N 09°02′26″E
- Country: Italy
- Region: Lombardy
- Metropolitan city: Milan (MI)
- Frazioni: Lucernate, Mazzo Milanese, Passirana, Terrazzano, Biringhello, Castellazzo, Pantanedo

Government
  - Mayor: Andrea Orlandi (PD)

Area
  - Total: 22.24 km^{2} (8.59 sq mi)
- Elevation: 156 m (512 ft)

Population (2026)
  - Total: 51,000
  - Density: 2,300/km^{2} (5,900/sq mi)
- Demonym: Rhodensi
- Time zone: UTC+1 (CET)
  - Summer (DST): UTC+2 (CEST)
- Postal code: 20017
- Dialing code: 02
- Patron saint: Victor Maurus
- Saint day: 8 May
- Website: Official website

Rho (Italian: [ˈrɔ]; Lombard: Rò; Latin: Rhaudum) is a city and comune (municipality) in the Metropolitan City of Milan in the region of Lombardy in Italy, located about 14 kilometres (9 miles) northwest of Milan. It has 51,000 inhabitants.

== Etymology ==
One theory derives the name from the Campi Raudi where the Roman consul Caius Marius defeated the Cimbri. The name may be from the Celtic rhaudes 'field', or raud or rod 'river' (cf. Roddi and Roddino in the Province of Cuneo). Another theory postulates that the city was founded by expatriates from the Greek island of Rhodes.

The current name of Rho, with the "h" in the middle, was made official in 1932, but the town has had various other names. The first document mentioning Rho, in 846, calls it Vico Raudo, and it consists of a hamlet surrounded by cultivated lands. Vico is a group of houses in the country, while Raudo probably comes from the Latin Rhaudum, a rough castle existing there. Other names include: Rhode, Rodo, Raude, Raudo, Rhaudum; in 16th-17th century one common version was Aro, then Rò, Rhò and Rho.

In his Commentari sulle famiglie milanesi, Raffaele Fagnani said it had a Rhodian origin.

== History ==
=== Ancient times ===
Rho is one of the most ancient towns of Lombardy, originating during the Roman era. This was confirmed by excavations associated with building and road construction in 1876, 1890 and 1917. Additional research during the 20th century showed that the town had remarkable importance during the imperial age, when it was part of the XI Transpadanian region.

The current topography can be traced to a style of organization from ancient Roman centuriation: most of the roads run parallel in east-west or north–south directions. The reference axes are the cardo (north–south, via Madonna and via Garibaldi) and the Decumano (east–west, via Matteotti and via Porta Ronca). These roads cross in piazza San Vittore, nowadays still the centre of the town.

Further archaeological research confirmed the existence in the Roman age of the Via Mediolanum-Verbannus, a road connecting Milan to the Lake Maggiore, passing through Legnano and Gallarate. Along this infrastructure, Rho was placed at the 10th mile, the resting point for the army then. Ancient Romans redirected the flow of Olona in Lucernate, digging an artificial riverbed directed to Milan and running along the road. This was considered a fundamental solution to increase traffic on the road, as transport by water was a much easier solution to transport big amounts of goods.

The Christianization of the village took place in the 4th – 5th centuries. In the piazza San Vittore, an ancient cemetery and a Christian chapel has been found; in the current via Belvedere were discovered Capuchin graves with engravings of alfa and omega.

=== Middle Ages ===
The barbarian invasions caused a deep economic crisis in the zone, and the power passed to Lombards and then to Franks. During the Lombard reign, the village assumed in its own topography names that still exist nowadays; Pomero, for example, from the Latin Post Moerus, meaning out of the walls. Such origin is nevertheless not universally recognised: some texts related it to the presence in the place of several apple trees. In the same period, Rho is conferred the appellation of Curtis, a particular form of organization in the feudal society.

Rho is first mentioned in a written document from January 9, 846 AD, a certificate of permutation by the notary Agatone, referring to the village simply as a bunch of houses under the name of Vicus Raudus, with a church entitled to Sant'Ambrogio and a rough castle. Two other parchments recalling Vicus Raudus are dated 871.

Around 1000 AD the town bloomed as a free commune and in 1004 Emperor Henry II, after the victory over the Lombards of King Arduin of Ivrea and his coronation as King of Italy, visited Rho, signing some documents; he accorded to Rodo the role of capopieve and instituted a weekly market, which takes place every Monday even nowadays. He also instituted a Court of Justice and dug a canal for irrigation, using the waters of Olona.

It dates back to the 11th century, also the half-legendary Giovanni de Raude, flagbearer of the Christian army during the First Crusade; he was the man hoisting the first Christian flag on the Jerusalem walls in the battle of July 15, 1099.

In 1160, Rho was razed to the ground by Frederick Barbarossa, as punishment for rebellion against the Holy Roman Empire; it was quickly rebuilt. Between 1130 and 1215, nine consuls from Rho are recorded in the Milanese state, some of them belonging to the family of Capitanei de Raude, residing in Rho since 1196.

According to a document filed in the Archive of the Ospedale Maggiore of Milan, around 1300 a first hospital was built in Rho; in 1481 its goods were bought by the Augustinians friars of Santa Maria del Pasquerio in Rho.

In 1305 the noble Cressone Crivelli tried with his soldiers to take possession of Rho and Nerviano, but he was defeated by the popular reaction. Eight years later, the town was nonetheless conquered by Milan, which killed or imprisoned almost all the inhabitants.

Because of its water and fertile lands, in the 15th century many Milanese notables moved to Rho, building sumptuous palaces, mostly no longer existing. The noble presence was such that in Rho was instituted a Universitas nobilium dicti loci de Raude. Between the 16th and 17th centuries, two new monasteries were built: by Agostinians and by Capuchins (on the road to Lucernate), both destroyed in the Napoleonic invasion.

=== Modern era ===
In 1511, the Landsknecht, commanded by Matteo Schinner, sacked Rho during their descent into Italy. Then the Spanish domination took place, and in 1539 King Charles V granted the feud to the Visconti family. In 1570 a plague epidemic took place in the population, already weakened by the Spanish oppression.

According to the chronicles of that time, on 24 April 1583 a painting of Pietà cried blood tears, an event subsequently recognised as a miracle by the Catholic Church. Instead of the chapel where the painting was placed, a Sanctuary to the Lady of Sorrows was built, with the collaboration of several artists among the best of the region.

During the 17th century, the plague hit the zone again, and in 1663 the inhabitants erected in the current piazza San Vittore a Croce della peste (Cross of the plague), moved beside the parish church in 1928 and moved back to its original place seventy years later.

In 1928 a Royal Decree assigned to Rho the town of Passirana, previously part of the comune of Lainate; in 1932 Rho got the official title of Città.

On 10 October 1956, in the hamlet Terrazzano, two drifters abducted about one hundred students and three teachers of the local primary school. During the police blitz, which took place after six hours, policemen mistakenly killed Sante Zennaro, who had heroically tried rescuing children negotiating with the kidnapper.

At the beginning of the 21st century, the new exposition centre of Fiera di Milano was built inside an area for 90% in the territory of Rho and for the remaining part in the township of Pero. Inaugurated in 2005, it was projected by the architect Massimiliano Fuksas and is constituted by eight pavilions for a total exposition surface of 345,000 square metres (3,710,000 square feet) indoors and 60,000 square metres (650,000 square feet) outdoors. In a nearby area, the Expo 2015 took place.

== Geography ==
Rho is lapped by the river Olona and crossed by its tributaries Bozzente and Lura, nowadays partially cloaked inside the town.

To the north and east of the town, there is the road of national interest Strada statale 33 del Sempione, which in the past crossed the town itself, in the current corso Europa. Rho is at the meeting point of railways linking Milan to Varese (Line S5) and Domodossola and Milan to Novara (Line S6).

In Passirana, there is a meteo station, managed in cooperation with the Lombard Meteorological Centre.

=== Frazioni ===
Inside the municipality of Rho are located seven frazioni:

- Castellazzo: modest inhabited area in the western part of the communal territory, close to the place where a country manor house was situated; nowadays it is located near the popular residential quarter of via Capuana
- Biringhello: small village up north-west of the town, beyond the Sempione road and bordering with Barbaiana of Lainate
- Lucernate: popular southern neighbourhood, beyond the railway station, in the zone of resurgences
- Mazzo: called also Mazzo Milanese or Mazzo di Rho, densely populated eastern hamlet, close to the Fiera di Milano.
- Pantanedo: little hamlet, east of Mazzo, made up of just an inhabited farmhouse and some industrial plants
- Passirana: town located in the north part of the municipality, close to Arese
- Terrazzano: big north-east hamlet, near the junction between A4 and A50 (tool-house of Terrazzano on the A50), it is near to Arese too.

== Demographics ==
Historical population
Year	Pop.	±%
1861	6,891	—
1871	7,390	+7.2%
1881	7,835	+6.0%
1901	9,850	+25.7%
1911	12,844	+30.4%
1921	14,264	+11.1%
1931	18,647	+30.7%
1936	19,823	+6.3%
1951	24,428	+23.2%
1961	34,231	+40.1%
1971	47,301	+38.2%
1981	50,666	+7.1%
1991	51,848	+2.3%
2001	50,246	−3.1%
2011	50,052	−0.4%
2021	50,618	+1.1%
Source: ISTAT

As of 2026, the population is 51,000, of which 48.4% are males, and 51.6% are females. Minors make up 14.7% of the population, and seniors make up 25.6%.

=== Immigration ===
As of 2025, immigrants make up 14.3% of the population. The 5 largest foreign countries of birth are Ukraine, Romania, Peru, Egypt, and Albania.

== Coat of arms ==
The coat of arms of the municipality is the wheel with five spokes, crest of the Capitanei de Raude family, vassals of the dukes of Saxony and Bavaria. The five spokes are recalling five emperors: Henry the Fowler, Otto I, Otto II, Otto III and Henry II. In heraldry, the wheel is a symbol of luck or victory, recalling the Latin saying: the powerful wheel cru;shed every opponent.

In the ancient Basilica of Aquileia there is a chapel named after the Torriani family, where, between two coffins, stands the tombstone of Allegranza da Rho (14th century), wife of Corrado della Torre and mother of the patriarch Cassono della Torre. On the tombstone is engraved the crest of Rho, pictured as a shield with a wheel in the middle.

== Rail transport ==
Rho is served by two railway stations: Rho, in the city centre, and Rho Fiera Milano, located by the FieraMilano complex.

== Notable people ==
- Kevin Giovesi (born 1993), racing driver

== See also ==
- Battle of Vercellae
