= Trecella railway station =

Railway station in Italy

Trecella
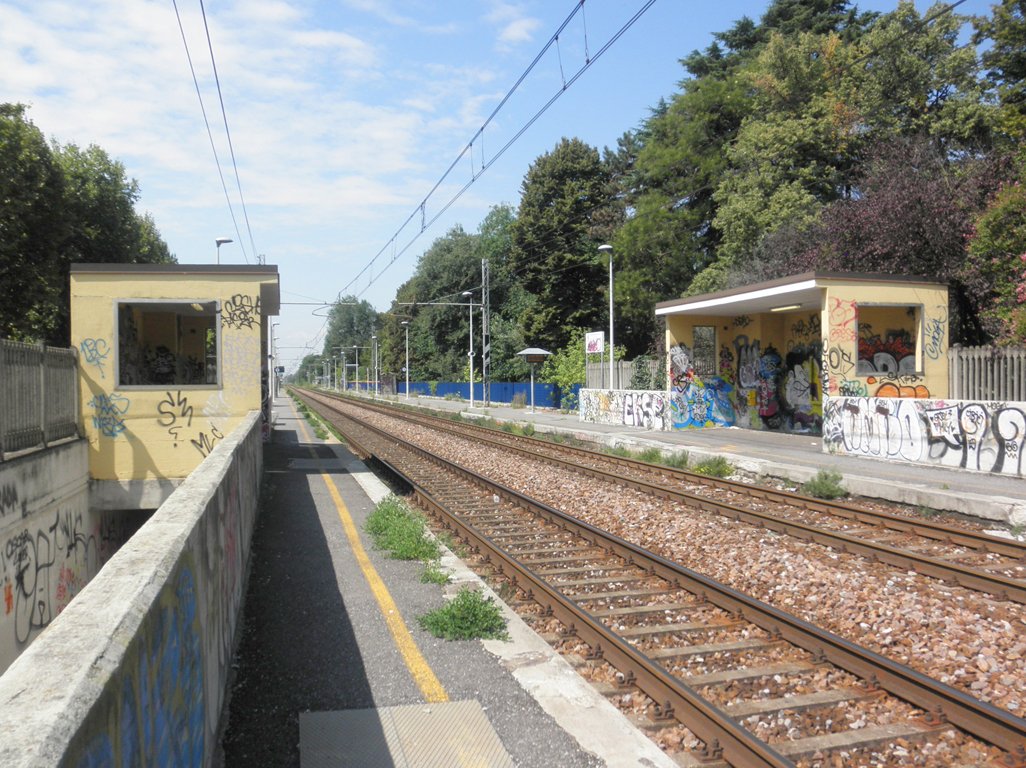

General information
- Location: Via Resta; Pozzuolo Martesana, Milan, Lombardy; Italy
- Coordinates: 45°30′46″N 09°28′49″E
- Operator: Rete Ferroviaria Italiana
- Line: Milan–Venica
- Distance: 24.585 km (15.276 mi) from Milano Centrale
- Platforms: 2
- Tracks: 2
- Train operators: Trenord

Other information
- Fare zone: STIBM: Mi6
- Classification: Silver

Services
Preceding station	Trenord	Following station
Pozzuolo Martesana towards Varese	Line S5 (Milan suburban railway service)	Cassano d'Adda towards Treviglio
Pozzuolo Martesana towards Novara	Line S6 (Milan suburban railway service)	Cassano d'Adda towards Treviglio
Location
- Location within Lombardy Location within Northern Italy Location within Italy

Trecella railway station is a railway station in Italy. Located on the Milan–Venice railway, it serves the hamlet of Trecella, in the municipality of Pozzuolo Martesana.

== Services ==
Trecella is served by lines S5 and S6 of Milan suburban railway network, operated by the Lombard railway company Trenord.

== See also ==
- Milan suburban railway network
