= Morengo–Bariano railway station =

Railway station in Italy

Morengo–Bariano
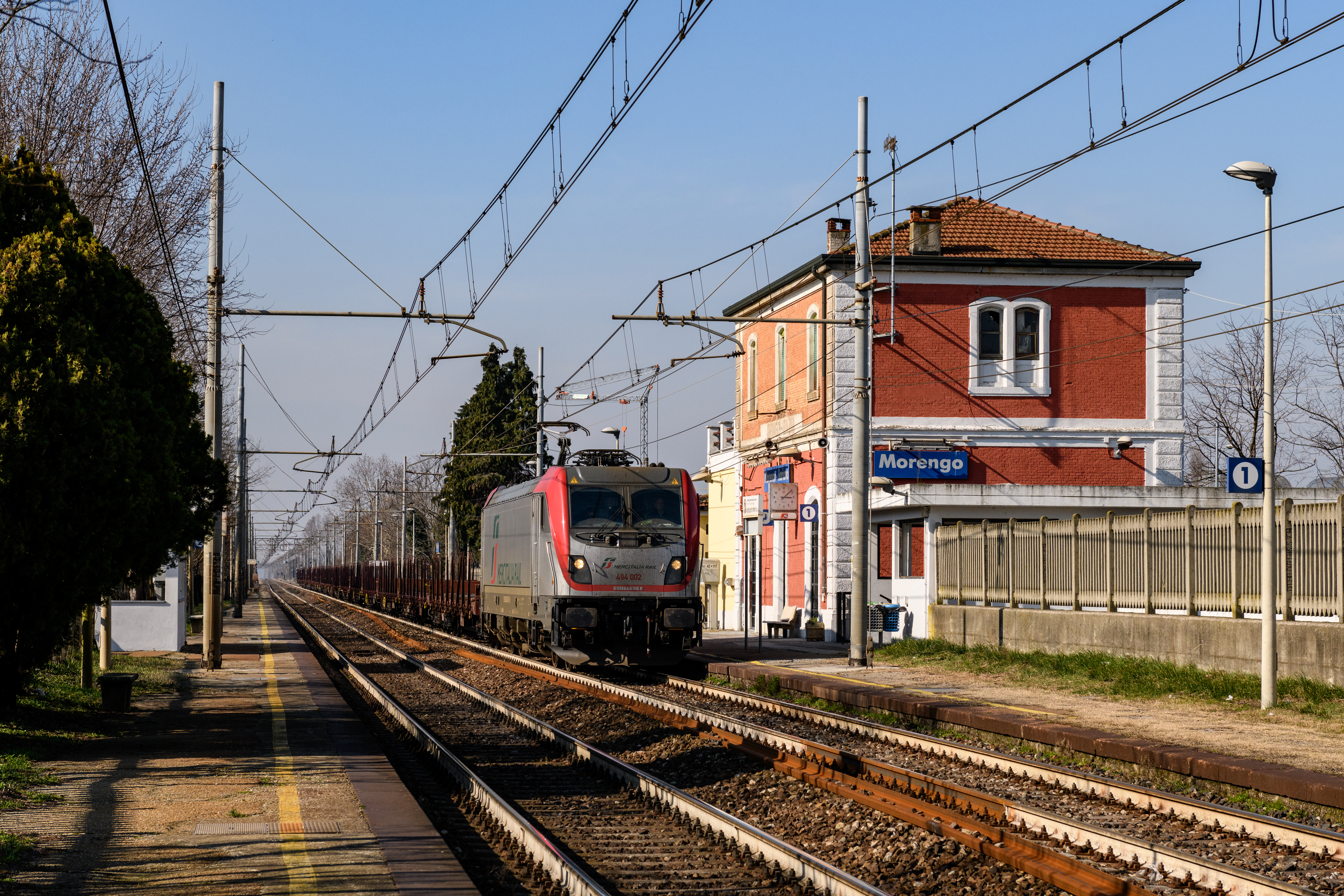
- Morengo-Bariano railway station

General information
- Location: Via Locatelli, Bariano, Lombardy; Italy
- Coordinates: 45°31′17″N 09°42′11″E
- Owner: Rete Ferroviaria Italiana
- Operator: Trenord
- Line: Milan–Venice railway
- Distance: 42.117 km (26.170 mi) from Milano Centrale
- Platforms: 2
- Tracks: 2

Other information
- Classification: Silver
Location
- Location within Lombardy Location within Northern Italy Location within Italy

Morengo–Bariano (Italian: Stazione di Morengo-Bariano) is a railway station serving the towns of Morengo and Bariano, in the region of Lombardy, northern Italy. The station is located on the Milan–Venice railway. The train services are operated by Trenord.

== Train services ==
The station is served by the following service(s):

- Regional services (Treno regionale) Sesto San Giovanni – Milan – Treviglio – Brescia

== See also ==
- History of rail transport in Italy
- List of railway stations in Lombardy
- Rail transport in Italy
- Railway stations in Italy
