= Treviglio–Bergamo railway =

Northern Italian transport link

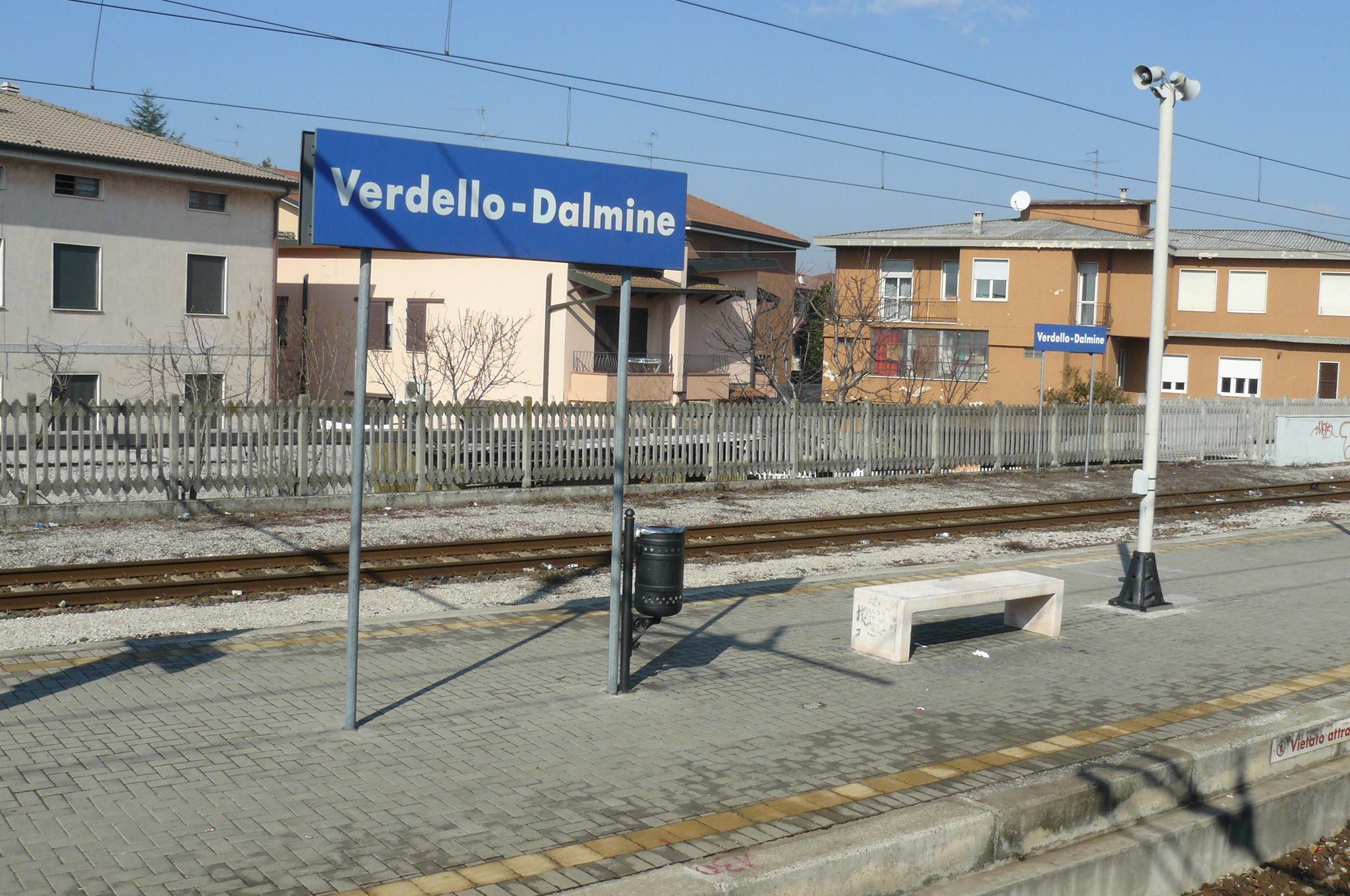

Overview
- Native name: Ferrovia Treviglio-Bergamo
- Status: in use
- Owner: RFI
- Line number: 29
- Locale: Lombardy, Italy
- Termini: Treviglio railway station; Bergamo railway station
- Stations: 7

Service
- Type: heavy rail
- Services: R2, RE2
- Operator(s): Trenord

History
- Opened: 1857

Technical
- Line length: 22 km (14 mi)
- Number of tracks: 2
- Track gauge: 1,435 mm (4 ft 8 1/2 in) standard gauge
- Electrification: 3 kV DC overhead line
Route map
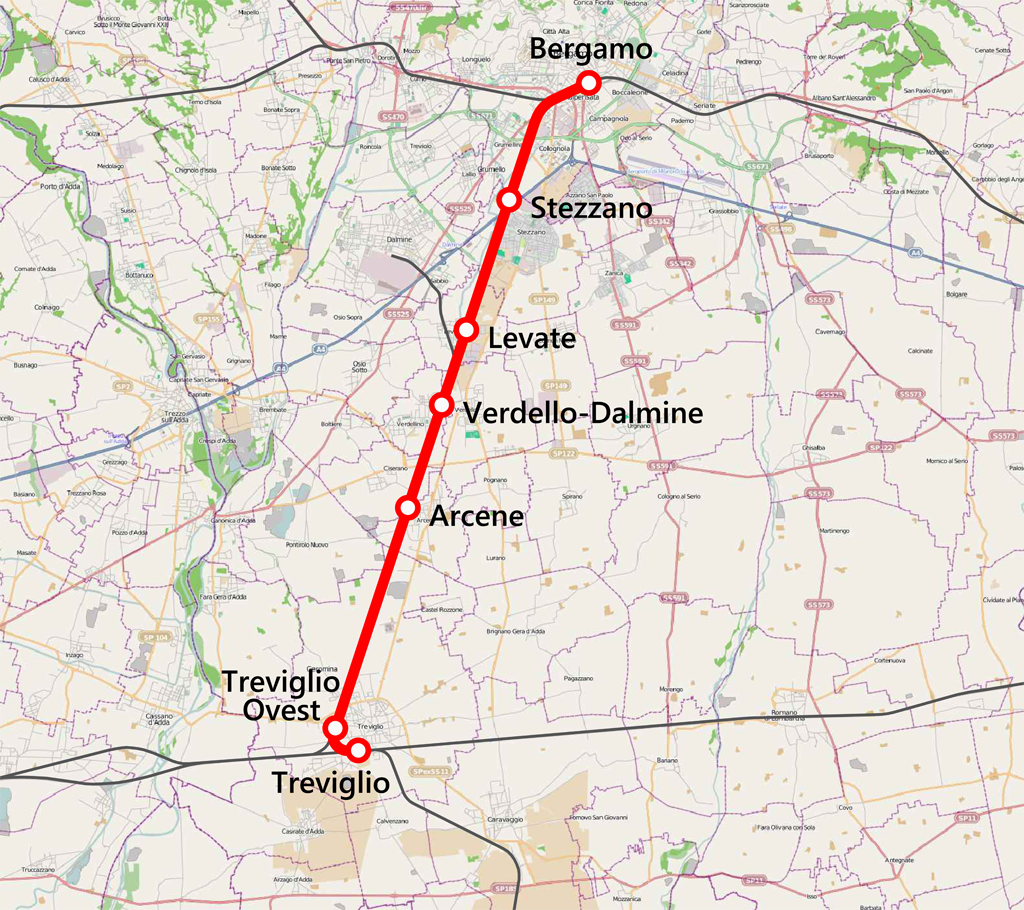
- Source: Italian railway atlas

The Treviglio–Bergamo railway is a railway line in Lombardy, Italy. The railway infrastructure is managed by the Rete Ferroviaria Italiana, which classifies it as one of its complementary lines. The passenger service is operated by Trenord as a regional service.

== History ==
The line was planned in the last years of the Austrian domination of Lombardy, and opened in 1857 before the Second Italian War of Independence.

It was electrified in 1954.

== See also ==
- List of railway lines in Italy
