= Pozzuolo Martesana railway station =

Railway station in Italy

Pozzuolo Martesana
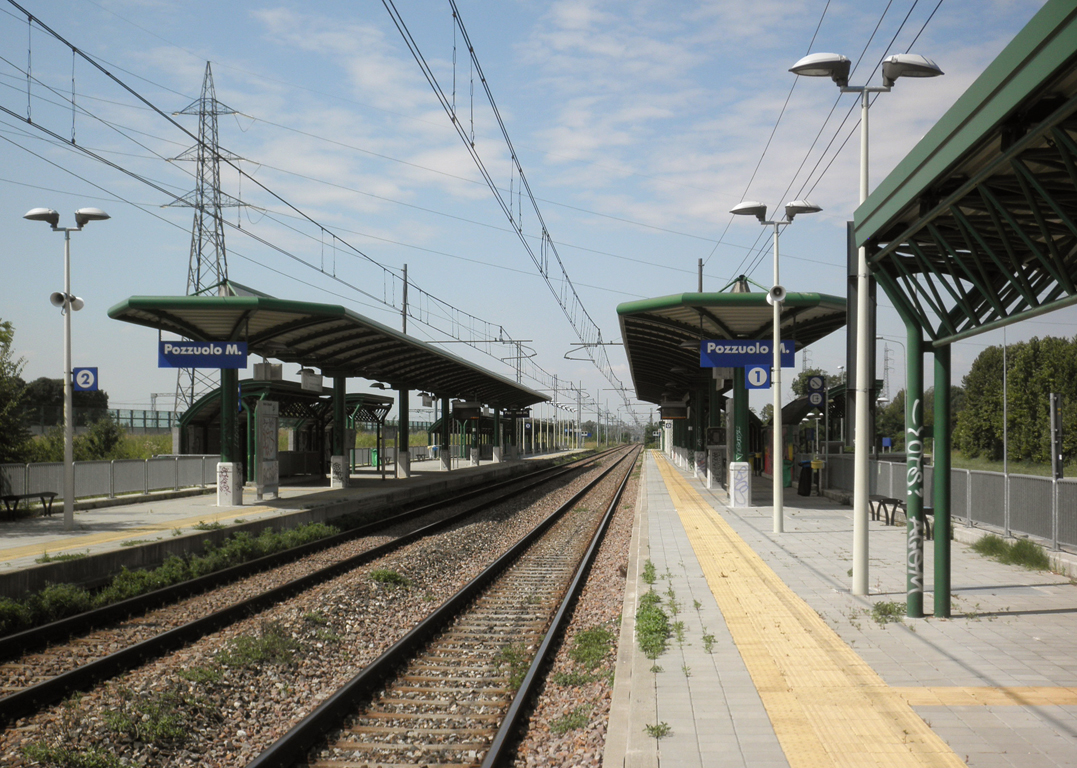

General information
- Location: Pozzuolo Martesana, Milan, Lombardy; Italy
- Coordinates: 45°30′31″N 09°27′23″E
- Operator: Rete Ferroviaria Italiana
- Line: Milan–Venice
- Distance: 22.610 km (14.049 mi) from Milano Centrale
- Platforms: 2
- Tracks: 2
- Train operators: Trenord

Other information
- Fare zone: STIBM: Mi6
- Classification: Silver

History
- Opened: 14 June 2009; 17 years ago

Services
Preceding station	Trenord	Following station
Melzo towards Varese	Line S5 (Milan suburban railway service)	Trecella towards Treviglio
Melzo towards Novara	Line S6 (Milan suburban railway service)	Trecella towards Treviglio
Location
- Location within Lombardy Location within Northern Italy Location within Italy

Pozzuolo Martesana is a railway station in Italy. Located on the Milan–Venice railway, it serves the municipality of Pozzuolo Martesana.

== Services ==
Pozzuolo Martesana is served by lines S5 and S6 of the Milan suburban railway network, operated by the Lombard railway company Trenord.

== See also ==
- Milan suburban railway network
