= Cassano d'Adda railway station =

Railway station in Italy

Cassano d'Adda
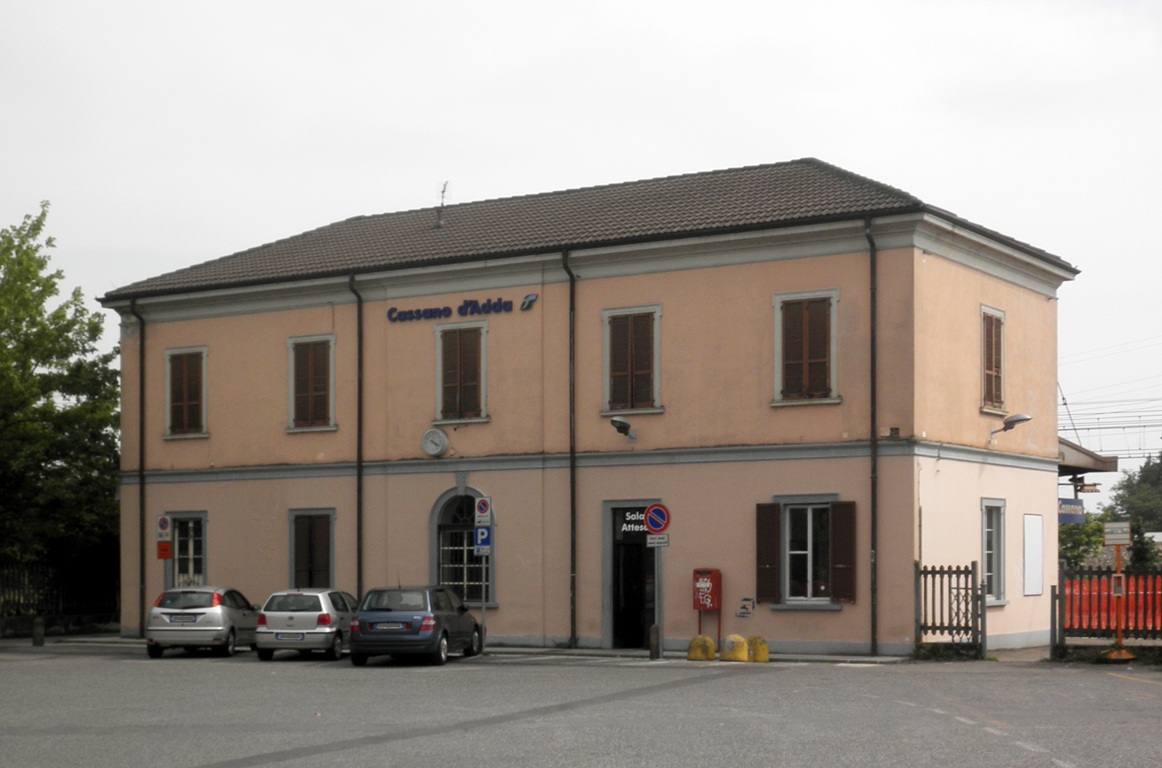

General information
- Location: Viale Stazione; Cassano d'Adda, Milan, Lombardy; Italy
- Coordinates: 45°30′52″N 09°30′46″E
- Operator: Rete Ferroviaria Italiana
- Line: Milan–Venice
- Distance: 27.152 km (16.871 mi) from Milano Centrale
- Platforms: 2
- Tracks: 2
- Train operators: Trenord

Other information
- Fare zone: STIBM: Mi7
- Classification: Silver

History
- Opened: 17 February 1846; 180 years ago
- Rebuilt: 2009

Services
| Preceding station | Trenord | Following station |
|---|---|---|
| Trecella towards Varese | Line S5 (Milan suburban railway service) | Treviglio Terminus |
| Trecella towards Novara | Line S6 (Milan suburban railway service) | Treviglio Terminus |
Location
- Location within Lombardy Location within Northern Italy Location within Italy

Cassano d'Adda is a railway station in Italy. Located on the Milan–Venice railway, it serves the town of Cassano d'Adda.

It is one of the original stations of the line, built by the Austrian Empire.

== Services ==
Cassano d'Adda is served by lines S5 and S6 of the Milan suburban railway network, operated by the Lombard railway company Trenord.

== See also ==
- Milan suburban railway network
