= Rho Fiera railway station =

Railway station in Italy

Rho Fiera Milano
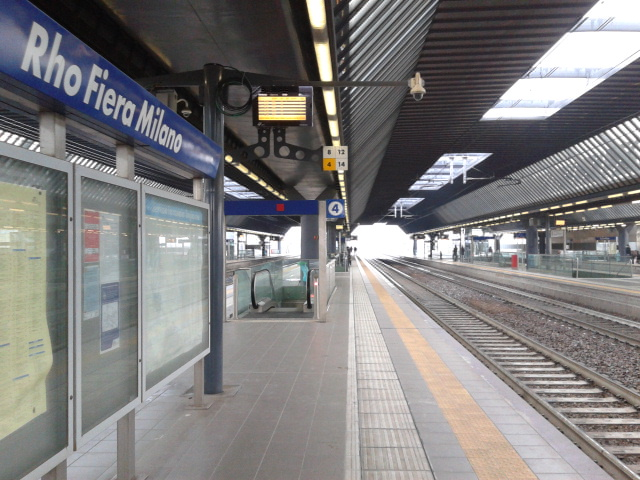
- Rho Fiera Milano

General information
- Location: Via Achille Grandi; Rho, Milan, Lombardy; Italy
- Coordinates: 45°31′16″N 09°05′17″E
- Owner: Rete Ferroviaria Italiana
- Operator: Trenitalia; Trenord
- Lines: Turin–Milan HS; Milan–Turin; Milan–Domodossola
- Distance: 12.618 km (7.840 mi) from Milano Centrale; 122.495 km (76.115 mi) from Turin
- Connections: Rho Fiera MM; ATM buses

Construction
- Architect: Angelo Mangiarotti

Other information
- Fare zone: STIBM: Mi3
- Classification: Silver

History
- Opened: 2008; 18 years ago

Services
Preceding station	Trenord	Following station
Rho towards Varese	Line S5 (Milan suburban railway service)	Milano Certosa towards Treviglio
Rho towards Novara	Line S6 (Milan suburban railway service)	Milano Certosa towards Treviglio
Rho Terminus	Line S11 (Milan suburban railway service)	Milano Certosa towards Chiasso
Location
- Location within Milan Location within Lombardy Location within Northern Italy Location within Italy

Rho Fiera railway station is a railway station in Italy. Located on the Turin–Milan railway, it serves the Fieramilano area in Rho. The station is located on Achille Grandi street. The train services are operated by Trenitalia and Trenord, and the station is one of the key nodes of the Milan suburban railway service.

== Train services ==
The station is served by the following services:

- Express regional services (Regionale Veloce) Turin - Chivasso – Vercelli – Novara – Milan
- Milan suburban railway service (S5) Varese - Rho - Milan - Treviglio
- Milan suburban railway service (S6) Novara - Rho - Milan - Treviglio
- Milan suburban railway service (S11) Rho - Milan - Monza - Seregno - Como - Chiasso

== EXPO 2015 ==
This was the most important railway station to reach EXPO. From Milan, the suburban services S5 and S6 as well as S14 (originating in Milano Rogoredo) of the suburban service, stopped at Rho Fiera train station, while passengers from Monza, Seregno, and Como could take line S11. Regional train services from Arona, Domodossola, Varese, and Turin had also stopped at Rho Fiera Milano train station.

== See also ==
- Milan suburban railway network
