= Vidalengo railway station =

Railway station in Italy

Vidalengo

General information
- Location: Via Donizzetti, Vidalengo, Lombardy; Italy
- Coordinates: 45°31′04″N 09°38′25″E
- Owner: Rete Ferroviaria Italiana
- Operator: Trenord
- Line: Milan–Venice railway
- Distance: 37.146 km (23.081 mi) from Milano Centrale
- Platforms: 2
- Tracks: 2

Other information
- Classification: Bronze
Location
- Location within Lombardy Location within Northern Italy Location within Italy

Vidalengo (Italian: Stazione di Vidalengo) is a railway station serving the town of Vidalengo, in the region of Lombardy, northern Italy. The station is located on the Milan–Venice railway. The train services are operated by Trenord.

== Train services ==
The station is served by the following service(s):

- Regional services (Treno regionale) Sesto San Giovanni - Milan - Treviglio - Brescia

== See also ==
- History of rail transport in Italy
- List of railway stations in Lombardy
- Rail transport in Italy
- Railway stations in Italy
