= Gazzada Schianno–Morazzone railway station =

Railway station in Italy

Gazzada Schianno–Morazzone
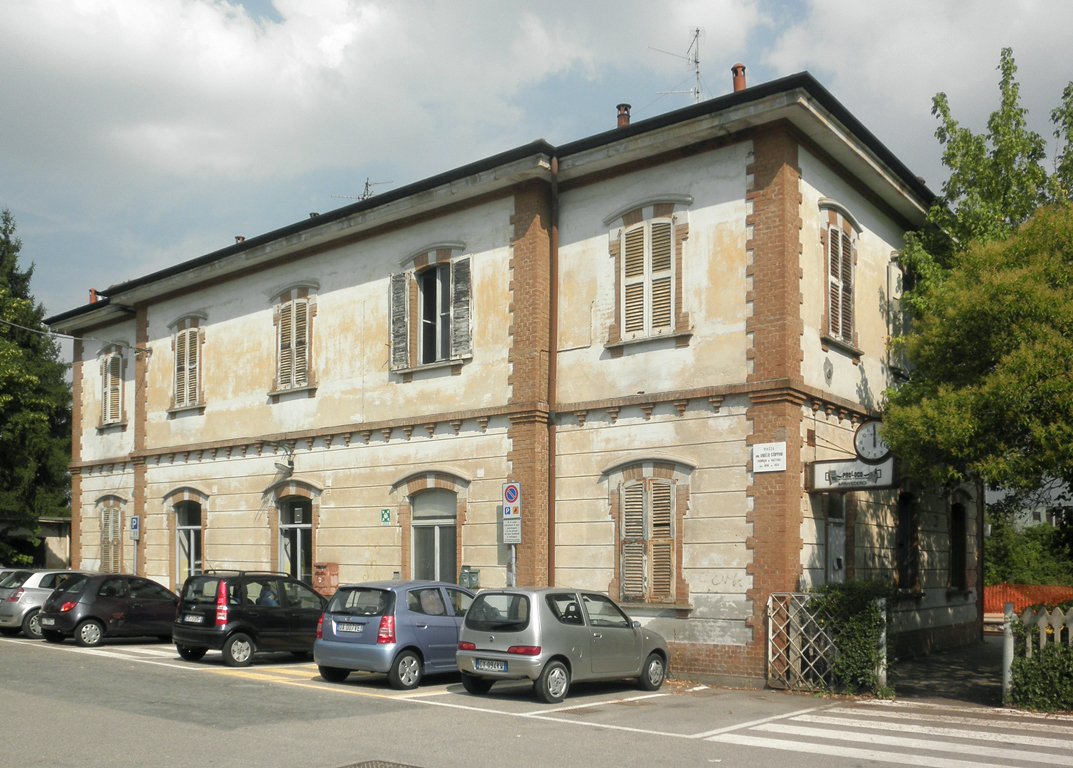

General information
- Location: Piazza Don Stoppani; Gazzada Schianno, Varese, Lombardy; Italy
- Coordinates: 45°46′43″N 08°49′29″E
- Operator: Rete Ferroviaria Italiana
- Line: Porto Ceresio–Milan
- Distance: 14.030 km (8.718 mi) from Gallarate
- Train operators: Trenord

Other information
- Classification: Silver

History
- Opened: 26 September 1865; 160 years ago
- Electrified: 14 October 1901

Services
Preceding station	Trenord	Following station
Varese Terminus	Line S5 (Milan suburban railway service)	Castronno towards Treviglio
Location
- Location within Lombardy Location within Northern Italy Location within Italy

Gazzada Schianno–Morazzone is a railway station in Varese, Lombardy, Italy.

== Services ==
Gazzada Schianno–Morazzone is served by the line S5 of the Milan suburban railway network, operated by the Lombard railway company Trenord.

== See also ==
- Milan suburban railway network
