= Porto Ceresio railway station =

Railway station in Porto Ceresio, Italy

Porto Ceresio
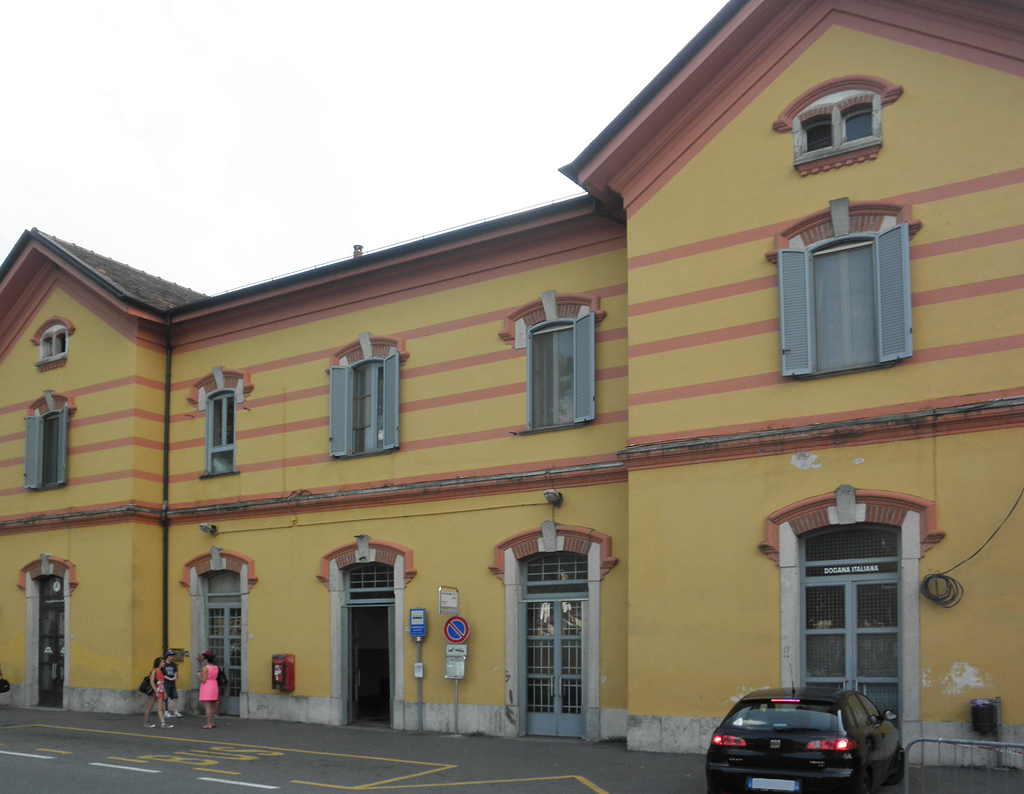

General information
- Location: Ceresio beach Porto Ceresio, Varese, Lombardy; Italy
- Coordinates: 45°54′14″N 08°54′01″E
- Owner: Ferrovie dello Stato
- Operator: Trenord
- Line: Milan–Porto Ceresio
- Distance: 14.290 km (8.879 mi) from Varese

History
- Opened: 18 July 1894; 132 years ago
Location
- Location within Lombardy Location within Northern Italy Location within Italy

Porto Ceresio is a railway station in Italy. It is the end of the Milan–Porto Ceresio railway.

It serves the town of Porto Ceresio, with an easy access to the navigation on the Ceresio.

== Services ==
Porto Ceresio is served by the regional trains operated by the lombard railway company Trenord.

== See also ==
- Lake Lugano

Preceding station	Ferrovie dello Stato	Following station
Terminus	Trenord; RE5	Bisuschio toward Milan P.Garibaldi
