= Varese Nord railway station =

Railway station in Italy

Varese Nord
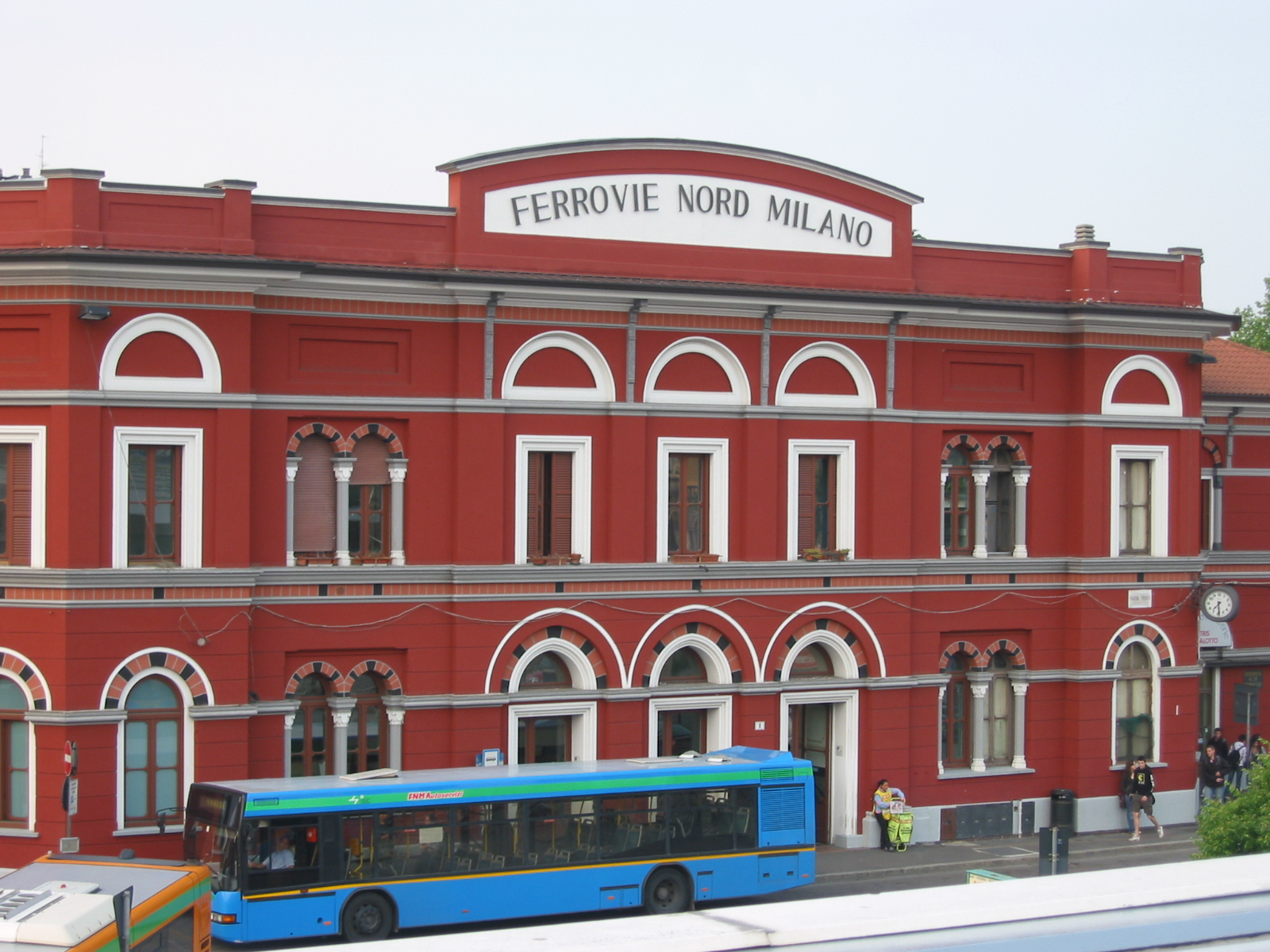

General information
- Location: Piazzale Trento; Varese, Varese, Lombardy; Italy
- Coordinates: 45°49′6″N 08°50′00″E
- Operator: Ferrovienord
- Line: Saronno-Laveno railway
- Platforms: 4
- Train operators: Trenord
- Connections: Urban and suburban buses, Varese railway station

Construction
- Accessible: yes

History
- Opened: 1885; 141 years ago
Location
- Location within Lombardy Location within Northern Italy Location within Italy

Varese Nord railway station (Italian: Stazione di Varese Nord) is a railway station in the town and comune of Varese, in the region of Lombardy, northern Italy. It is located on the Milan-Saronno railway. The station is currently managed by Ferrovienord (FN). Train services are operated by the lombard railway company Trenord.

== Location ==
Varese Nordrailway station is situated at Piazzale Trento. It should not be confused with the town's other railway stations, Varese and Varese Casbeno.

== Movement ==
The station is served by cadenced regional trains operated by Trenord as part of the service contract entered into with the government of the Lombardy Region.

== See also ==
- History of rail transport in Italy
- List of railway stations in Lombardy
- Rail transport in Italy
- Railway stations in Italy
