= Rho railway station =

Railway station in Italy

Rho
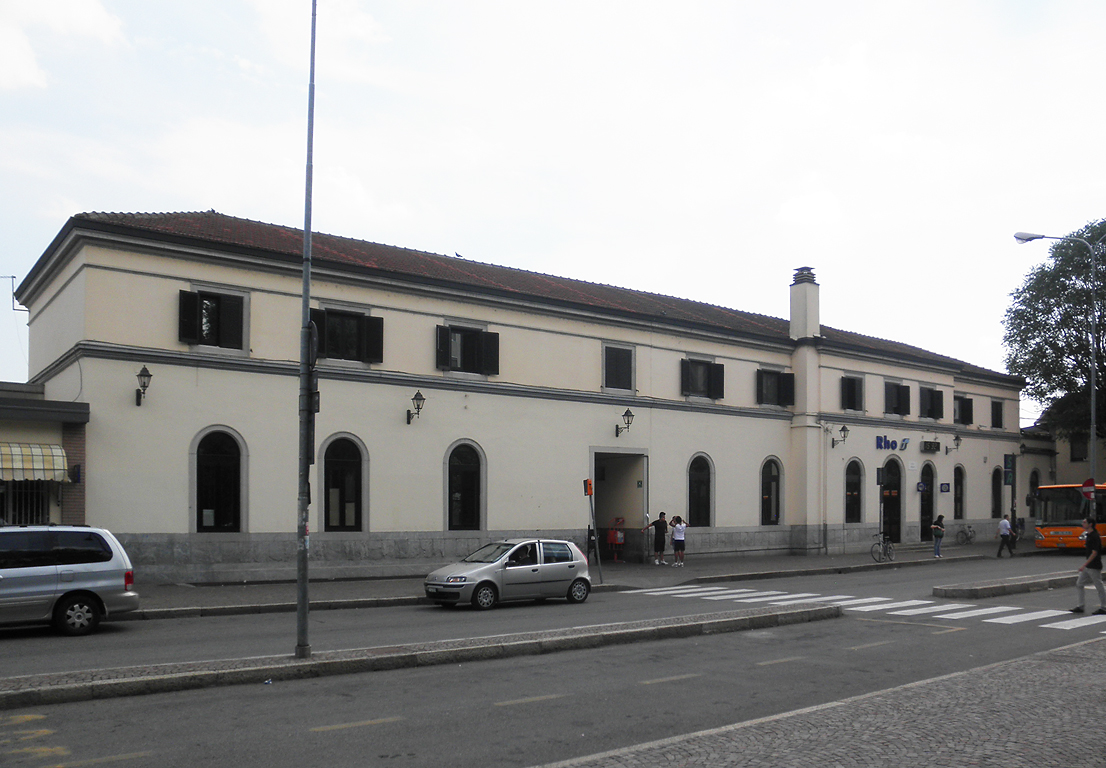

General information
- Location: Piazza Libertà 9 Rho, Milan, Lombardy; Italy
- Coordinates: 45°31′27″N 09°02′36″E
- Operator: Rete Ferroviaria Italiana
- Lines: Domodossola–Milan; Luino–Milan; Porto Ceresio–Milan; Turin–Milan
- Distance: 134.571 km (83.619 mi) from Torino Porta Nuova; 16.348 km (10.158 mi) from Milano Centrale
- Platforms: 6
- Tracks: 6
- Train operators: Trenord

Construction
- Platform levels: 1

Other information
- Fare zone: STIBM: Mi4
- Classification: Silver

History
- Opened: 18 October 1858; 167 years ago
- Electrified: 14 October 1901

Services
Preceding station	Trenord	Following station
Vanzago–Pogliano towards Varese	Line S5 (Milan suburban railway service)	Rho Fiera towards Treviglio
Pregnana Milanese towards Novara	Line S6 (Milan suburban railway service)	Rho Fiera towards Treviglio
Terminus	Line S11 (Milan suburban railway service)	Rho Fiera towards Chiasso
Location
- Location within Lombardy Location within Northern Italy Location within Italy

Rho railway station is a railway station in Italy, that serves the town of Rho. It is a junction of the Turin–Milan railway with the lines to Domodossola, to Luino and to Porto Ceresio. The train services are operated by Trenord.

== Train services ==
The station is served by the following services:

- Milan Metropolitan services (S5) Varese - Rho - Milan - Treviglio
- Milan Metropolitan services (S6) Novara - Rho - Milan - Treviglio
- Milan Metropolitan services (S11) Rho - Milan - Monza - Seregno - Como - Chiasso

== See also ==
- Milan suburban railway service
