= Pozzuolo Martesana =

- Comune
- Comune di Pozzuolo Martesana
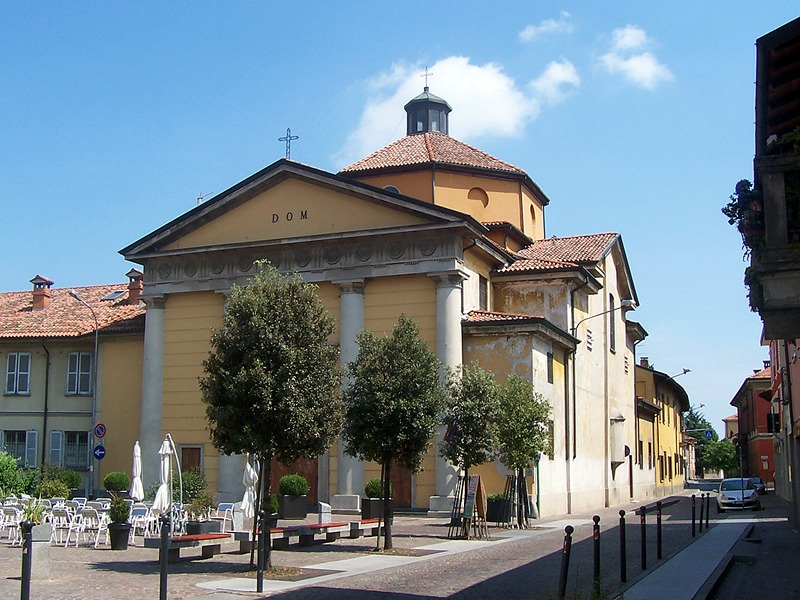

- Location within Italy Location within Lombardy
- Coordinates: 45°31′N 9°27′E
- Country: Italy
- Region: Lombardy
- Metropolitan city: Milan (MI)
- Frazioni: Trecella, Bisentrate

Government
  - Mayor: Angelo Maria Caterina

Area
  - Total: 12.14 km^{2} (4.69 sq mi)
- Elevation: 121 m (397 ft)

Population (30 November 2017)
  - Total: 8,442
  - Density: 695.4/km^{2} (1,801/sq mi)
- Demonym: Pozzuolesi
- Time zone: UTC+1 (CET)
  - Summer (DST): UTC+2 (CEST)
- Postal code: 20060
- Dialing code: 02
- Website: Official website

Pozzuolo Martesana (Lombard: Pozzoeu or Pozzoeul [puˈsøː(l)]) is a comune (municipality) in the Metropolitan City of Milan in the Italian region Lombardy, located about 25 kilometres (16 mi) east of Milan.

It has a population of around 7,000 inhabitants. The town is notable for hosting a production facility of the multinational company Ferrero. The factory was established in Pozzuolo Martesana due to the historical presence of abundant underground sources of pure water.

Pozzuolo Martesana borders the following municipalities: Inzago, Cassano d'Adda, Gorgonzola, Bellinzago Lombardo, Melzo, Truccazzano.

Pozzuolo Martesana is served by Pozzuolo Martesana railway station, the village of Trecella by Trecella railway station.

== Etymology and Administrative Divisions ==
The origin of the name Pozzuolo probably derives from the numerous spring water pools and fountains historically present in the area.

Since 1985, the municipality has comprised the following localities: Pozzuolo, Trecella, and Bisentrate.

== Events ==
Settembre in Festa is an annual cultural festival held in September, coinciding with the feast days of Pozzuolo Martesana and its hamlet, Trecella. The event features art exhibitions, concerts, theatrical performances, and tastings of local food and wine. Key venues include Palazzo Fumagalli, the Church of San Francesco, the Oratory of San Luigi, and Piazza San Marco in Trecella.

The local Pro Loco association organises various community events throughout the year, including traditional festivals, themed celebrations, and public gatherings such as the Carnival parade, typically held in early March.
