= Porto Ceresio–Milan railway =

Railway line in Lombardy, Italy

Overview
- Native name: Ferrovia Milano-Porto Ceresio
- Owner: RFI
- Locale: Lombardy, Italy
- Termini: Porto Ceresio railway station; Milan Porta Garibaldi railway station
- Stations: 20

Service
- Type: heavy rail
- Services: S5, RE5
- Operator(s): Trenord

History
- Opened: 18 July 1894

Technical
- Number of tracks: 2
- Track gauge: 1,435 mm (4 ft 8 1/2 in) standard gauge
- Electrification: 3 kV DC

Porto Ceresio–Milan railway is a railway line in Lombardy, Italy. It uses the tracks of the Milan–Arona railway until Gallarate.

== History ==
The line was opened from Gallarate to Varese on 26 September 1865; in 1885 it went to the state network Rete Mediterranea, operated by the Società per le Strade Ferrate del Mediterraneo.

In 1894 the Società per le Strade Ferrate del Mediterraneo extended the line from Varese to Porto Ceresio, through a beloved touristic area until the shore of Lake Lugano.

In 1899 the line was chosen for an experimental electrification with a third rail at 650 V DC, put into service in 1901–1902.

From 1905 the line was operated by the new state railway company, the Ferrovie dello Stato; but between 1908 and 1918 the section from Varese to Porto Ceresio, that had been built by the Società per le Strade Ferrate del Mediterraneo, was given back to that society.

In 1949 the line was electrified with the current overhead line system, with a voltage of 3 kV DC; the third rail was dismantled two years later.

Since December 2004 the section from Gallarate to Varese is used by the trains of the line S5 of Milan suburban railway service.

Since 1 January 2010 the section from Varese to Porto Ceresio has been put out of service, due to reconstruction works related with the new international line to Stabio, that will connect Varese with Como and Lugano via Mendrisio.

== See also ==
- List of railway lines in Italy
