= Domodossola–Milan railway =

Key northern Italian transport link

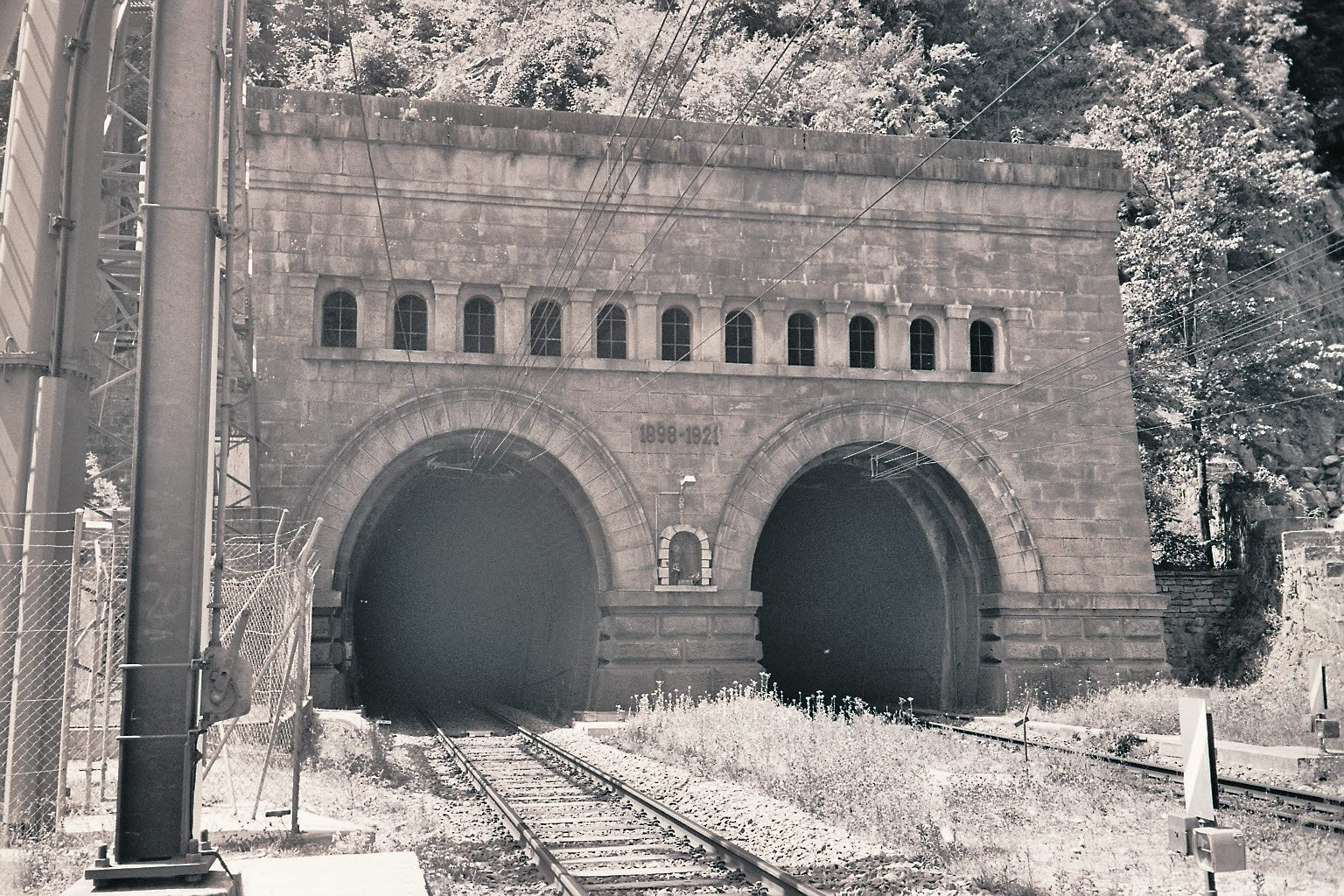
- Simplon Tunnel at the northern end of the line.

Overview
- Native name: Ferrovia Milano-Domodossola
- Owner: RFI
- Locale: Italy
- Termini: Domodossola railway station; Milan Central railway station
- Stations: 27

Service
- Type: heavy rail
- Services: R23, RE4
- Operator(s): Trenitalia, Trenord

History
- Opened: 1888

Technical
- Line length: 153 km (95 mi)
- Number of tracks: 2
- Track gauge: 1,435 mm (4 ft 8 1/2 in) standard gauge
- Electrification: 3000 V DC

The Domodossola–Milan railway line is a major Italian railway route and an important part of the European rail network. It is one of Italy's busiest lines for both passenger and freight trains. The line connects Milan and Domodossola with Brig, an important Swiss railway junction, via the Simplon Tunnel. Direct passenger trains ran from Brig to Paris (via Lausanne and Geneva) and Brussels and Luxembourg via Basel. The line runs through lower Varese Province, the valley of Ossola and along the shore of Lake Maggiore.

== History ==
The line was completed to Gallarate in the early 1860s and was extended over the Ticino River in 1882, reaching Domodossola in 1888. The Simplon Tunnel was completed and the line extended to it from Domodossola in 1906; it was duplicated in 1922. It was part of the Società per le strade ferrate dell'Alta Italia (Upper Italian Railways) from 1865, the Società per le Strade Ferrate del Mediterraneo (Mediterranean Railway Company) from 1885 and Ferrovie dello Stato from 1905.

== Route ==
The line is fully electrified at 3,000 volts DC and is double track. In some stretches between Arona and Domodossola, the two tracks are not adjacent: the southbound line towards Milan runs directly along the shore of Lake Maggiore; the northbound line towards Domodossola is located a little inland because of the local geography. At Domodossola the electrification system changes to the Swiss system of 15,000 volts AC 16.7 Hz for the Simplon Tunnel.

The regional passenger rail service is operated by Trenord. The section between Gallarate and Milan is also served by suburban line S5. The railway is also served by long-distance Eurocity and EuroNight trains, as well as the high-speed Cisalpino trains, which connect Milan to the Swiss cities of Lausanne, Geneva, Bern and Basel.

The Domodossola–Milan line is also used by freight trains operated by Trenitalia Cargo, SBB Cargo Italia and other private companies.

The line passes through the metropolitan area to the northwest of Milan, across the plain towards Gallarate. It continues through the forests of lower Varese Province towards Lake Maggiore. After Sesto Calende it crosses the Ticino River on an iron bridge, which was opened to traffic in 1882. State road 33 (the Milan–Simplon Pass road) uses the same bridge, above the railway. From Arona, the line largely runs along the western shore of Lake Maggiore, keeping above the shore, passing through the major tourist town of Stresa. After Baveno, it enters the Toce plain and runs for about 30 km (19 mi) up the Ossola valley to Domodossola. It then approaches the Simplon Tunnel through nine tunnels including the 2,966-metre-long (9,731 ft) Varzo Tunnel, which is built as a spiral in order to gain height.

== See also ==
- List of railway lines in Italy
