= Varese railway station =

Railway station in Varese, Italy

Varese
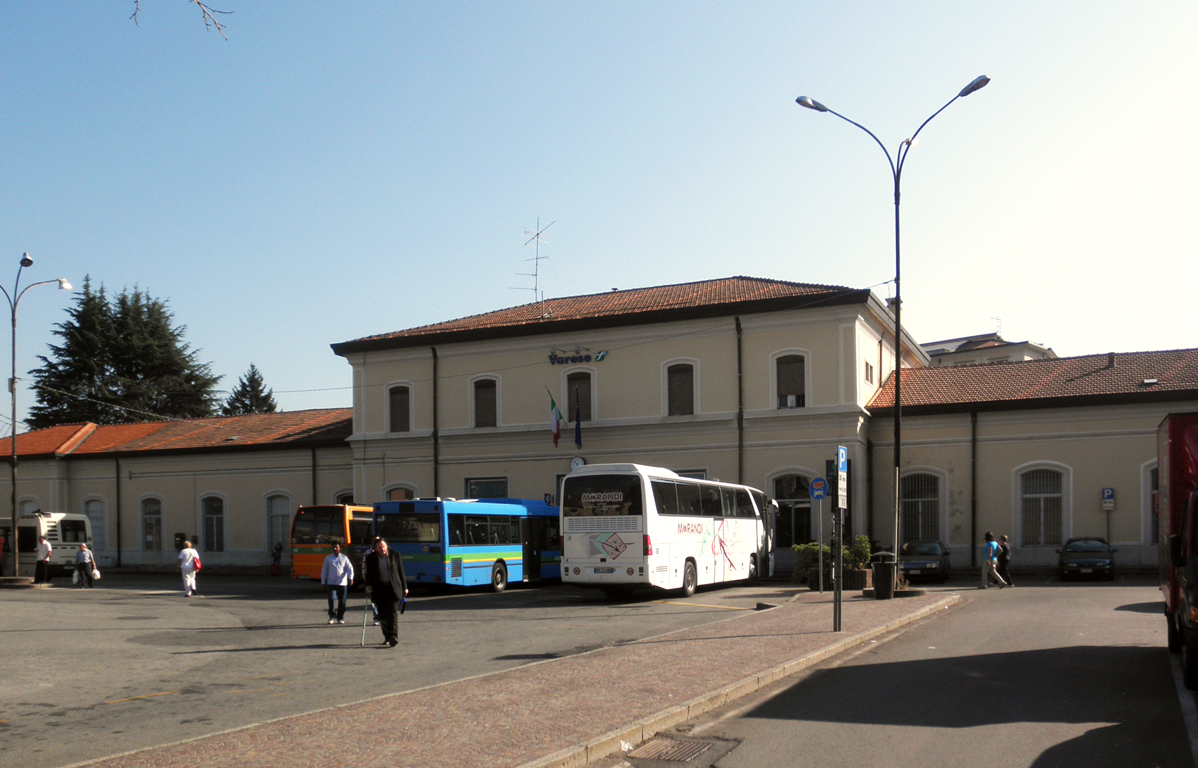

General information
- Location: Piazzale Trieste; 21100 Varese VA; Varese, Varese, Lombardy
- Coordinates: 45°49′00″N 08°49′56″E
- Operator: Rete Ferroviaria Italiana; Centostazioni
- Line: Porto Ceresio–Milan railway
- Distance: 18.458 km (11.469 mi) from Gallarate
- Train operators: Trenord
- Connections: Urban and suburban buses

Other information
- Classification: Gold

History
- Opened: 26 September 1865; 160 years ago
- Electrified: October 14, 1901

Services
Preceding station	Trenord	Following station
Terminus	Line S5 (Milan suburban railway service)	Gazzada Schianno–Morazzone towards Treviglio
Location
- Location within Lombardy Location within Northern Italy Location within Italy

Varese railway station (Italian: Stazione di Varese) serves the town and comune of Varese, in the region of Lombardy, northern Italy. Opened in 1865, it is located on the Porto Ceresio–Milan railway.

The station is currently managed by Rete Ferroviaria Italiana (RFI). However, the commercial area of the passenger building is managed by Centostazioni. Each of these companies is a subsidiary of Ferrovie dello Stato (FS), Italy's state-owned rail company.

Train services are operated by the lombard railway company Trenord.

== Location ==
Varese railway station is situated at Piazzale Trieste, on the eastern edge of the city centre. It should not be confused with the town's other railway stations, Varese Nord and Varese Casbeno.

== History ==
The station was opened on 26 September 1865, as end station of the line from Gallarate. It remained a terminal station until 18 July 1894, when the section to Porto Ceresio was opened.

== Features ==
The station yard has five tracks equipped with platforms, two of which are reserved for terminating trains and Line S5 suburban services to and from Milan and Treviglio.

Until the early 1990s, there were active goods services along the lines to Varese, and the station had a goods yard. Since then, following the termination of goods services, that yard has been transformed, with the agreement of FS, into a car parking station.

In addition to the five tracks used for passenger service, there are some tracks near the station used to store rolling stock that is out of service. These tracks are also a base for rail vehicles used for local line maintenance.

== Train movements ==
The station is the terminus of line S5 of the suburban rail service to Milan. It is also the terminus of Trenord regional trains for Milano Porta Garibaldi and Porto Ceresio on Lake Lugano, near the border with Switzerland.

As from 2018, Varese railway station has become international, upon the opening of the new Varese–Arcisate (I)–Stabio (CH)–Mendrisio railway, which branches off at Arcisate from the Varese-Porto Ceresio line, and then enters Switzerland at Stabio. On the new line, regional trains link Varese with Mendrisio, and there will also be direct trains between Malpensa Airport and Lugano.

== Interchange ==
The station is located a few hundred metres (or yards) from Piazzale Fratelli Kennedy, which has a bus station for urban bus lines, and from the suburban bus stops at Varese Nord railway station, with which, according to a municipal project, it should be unified.

Unification of the two stations would no doubt be useful to facilitate interchange of passengers between trains of the two different railway companies serving the two stations. However, it would also be difficult to achieve, because the two stations, as well as being at a slight difference in altitude, are separated by a former market square, currently being redeveloped, and the Piazzale Kennedy bus station.

== See also ==
- History of rail transport in Italy
- List of railway stations in Lombardy
- Rail transport in Italy
- Railway stations in Italy
