= Treviglio railway station =

Railway station in Treviglio, Italy

Treviglio
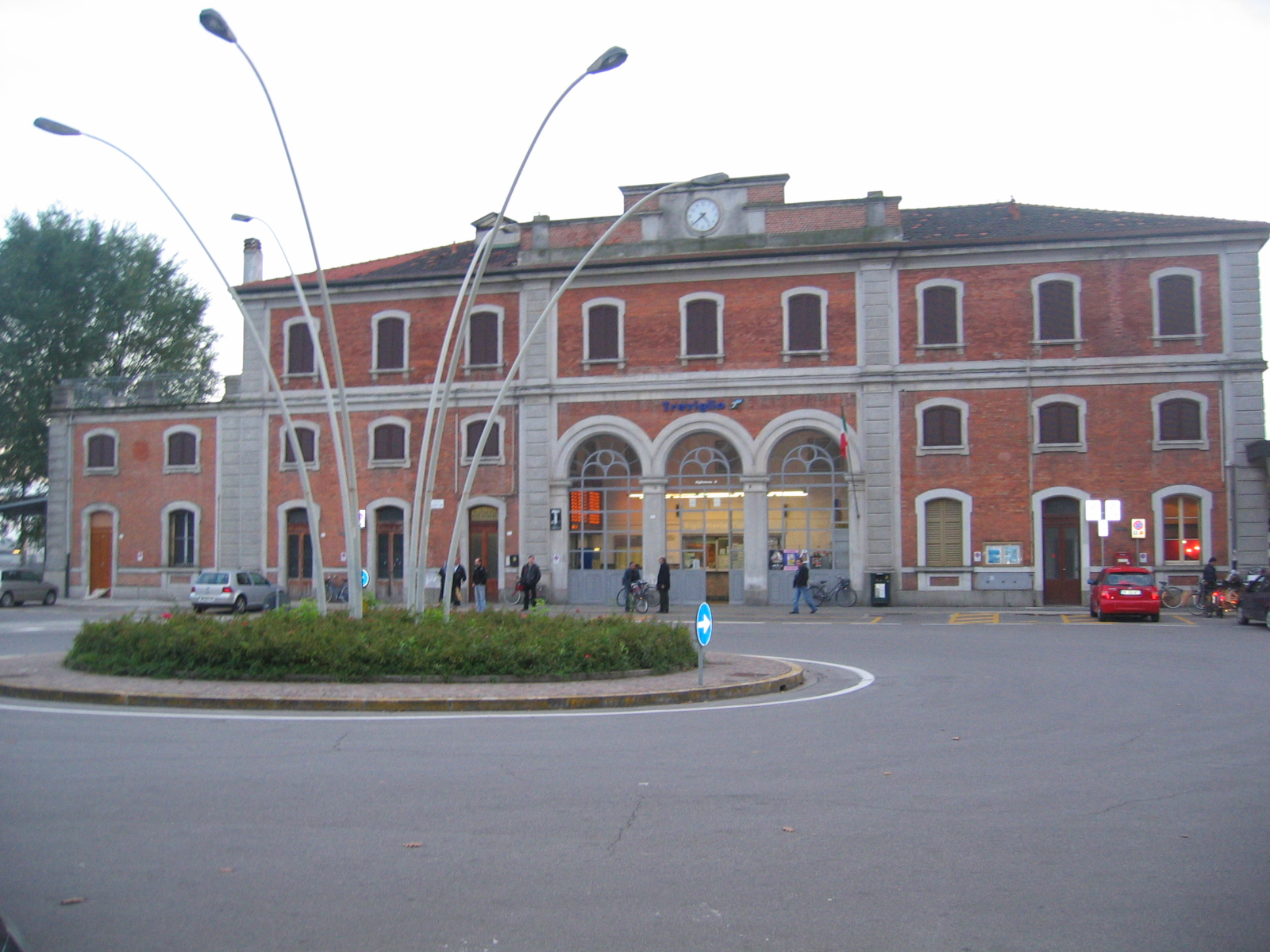

General information
- Location: Piazza Giuseppe Verdi; 24047, Treviglio; Italy
- Coordinates: 45°30′55″N 09°35′19″E
- Owner: Rete Ferroviaria Italiana
- Operator: Trenord
- Lines: Milano–Venezia; Treviglio–Bergamo; Treviglio–Cremona
- Distance: 33.143 km (20.594 mi) from Milano Centrale
- Platforms: 10

Other information
- Classification: Gold

History
- Opened: 5 March 1878; 148 years ago

Services
Preceding station	Trenord	Following station
Cassano d'Adda towards Varese	Line S5 (Milan suburban railway service)	Terminus
Cassano d'Adda towards Novara	Line S6 (Milan suburban railway service)	Terminus
Location
- Location within Lombardy Location within Northern Italy Location within Italy

Treviglio railway station (Italian: Stazione di Treviglio), also known as Treviglio centrale railway station (Italian: Stazione centrale di Treviglio) is the main station serving the town and comune of Treviglio, in the region of Lombardy, northern Italy. Opened in 1878, it has a higher average number of passengers per day than Treviglio's other railway station, Treviglio Ovest.

The station lies on the Milan–Venice railway, Treviglio–Bergamo railway and Treviglio–Cremona railway and is terminus of two suburban railways passing through Milan toward Novara (S6) and Varese (S5).

By those lines are also reachable Brescia, Lodi and Verona.

The station is managed by Rete Ferroviaria Italiana (RFI) and the commercial area of the passenger building is managed by Centostazioni. The train services are operated mainly by Trenord.

== Location ==
Treviglio railway station is situated at Piazzale Giuseppe Verdi, at the southern edge of the town centre.

The station offers a surveilled parking for bikes, a ticket office, a newsstand, a bar and a near small car parking.

On the Piazzale Giuseppe Verdi there are bus and taxi parkings, on the opposite side lie a bar and the Treviglio Hotel.

== History ==
The station was opened on 5 March 1878, upon the inauguration of the direct Treviglio–Rovato section of the Milan–Venice railway, being the second in the new Kingdom of Italy.

In 1885, the station became part of the Rete Adriatica, under the management of the Società per le Strade Ferrate Meridionali ("Company for the Southern Railways", SFM). After the nationalisation of Italy's railways in 1905, it was operated by the FS.

In 2014 the station has been modernized, with the reconstruction of the square before the facade to facilitate traffic and the introduction of elevators for disabled and cameras for security.

Since 2016 a police unit has been placed in the station, considering the increasing of aggressions and theft on public transports on national scale.

Before 1878, there had been two other stations which, at different times, had been called Treviglio:

- the first served as the end of the Milan Porta Tosa–Treviglio section;
- the second was located on the original section of the Milan–Venice line passing through Bergamo and Coccaglio. This was located south of the current Treviglio Ovest station.

=== The first station ===
The first Treviglio station, which was also informally referred to as Treviglio Molino, was located east of the current central station.

It was built by the Imperial-Regia Privilegiata Strada Ferrata Ferdinandea Lombardo-Veneta (German: k.k. priv. Lombardisch-Venetianische Ferdinandsbahn; "Imperial–Royal Privileged Lombard-Venetian Ferdinand Railway"), the company that had obtained the "privilege" (concession) for building and operating the Milan–Venice railway, also called the Ferdinandea after Ferdinand I of Austria.The original intention of the company was to connect Milan to Venice via Brescia. The section from Milan Porta Tosa station to Treviglio station was inaugurated on 15 February 1846. From that day, the railway service ran between Bergamo and Milan and passengers continued on stagecoaches between Treviglio and Vicenza, where the other section of the Ferdinandea began.

In 1852, the management of the railway and its infrastructure, including Treviso station, passed to the Lombardisch-Venetianische Staatsbahn (Italian: Strade Ferrate Lombardo-Venete dello Stato, "Lombard-Venetian State Railway"). In 1856 another transfer of ownership occurred, caused by a financial crisis of the Austrian treasury which ceded all its railways to a group of banks, including the Rothschild family. They formed the Imperial Regia Privilegiata Società delle ferrovie lombardo-venete, then merged three years later into the Imperial Regia Privilegiata Società delle ferrovie meridionali dello Stato, del Lombardo-Veneto e dell'Italia Centrale (part of the Austrian Southern Railway Company, Südbahn-Gesellschaft), when the same group acquired other railway lines in the Austrian Empire.

=== The second station ===
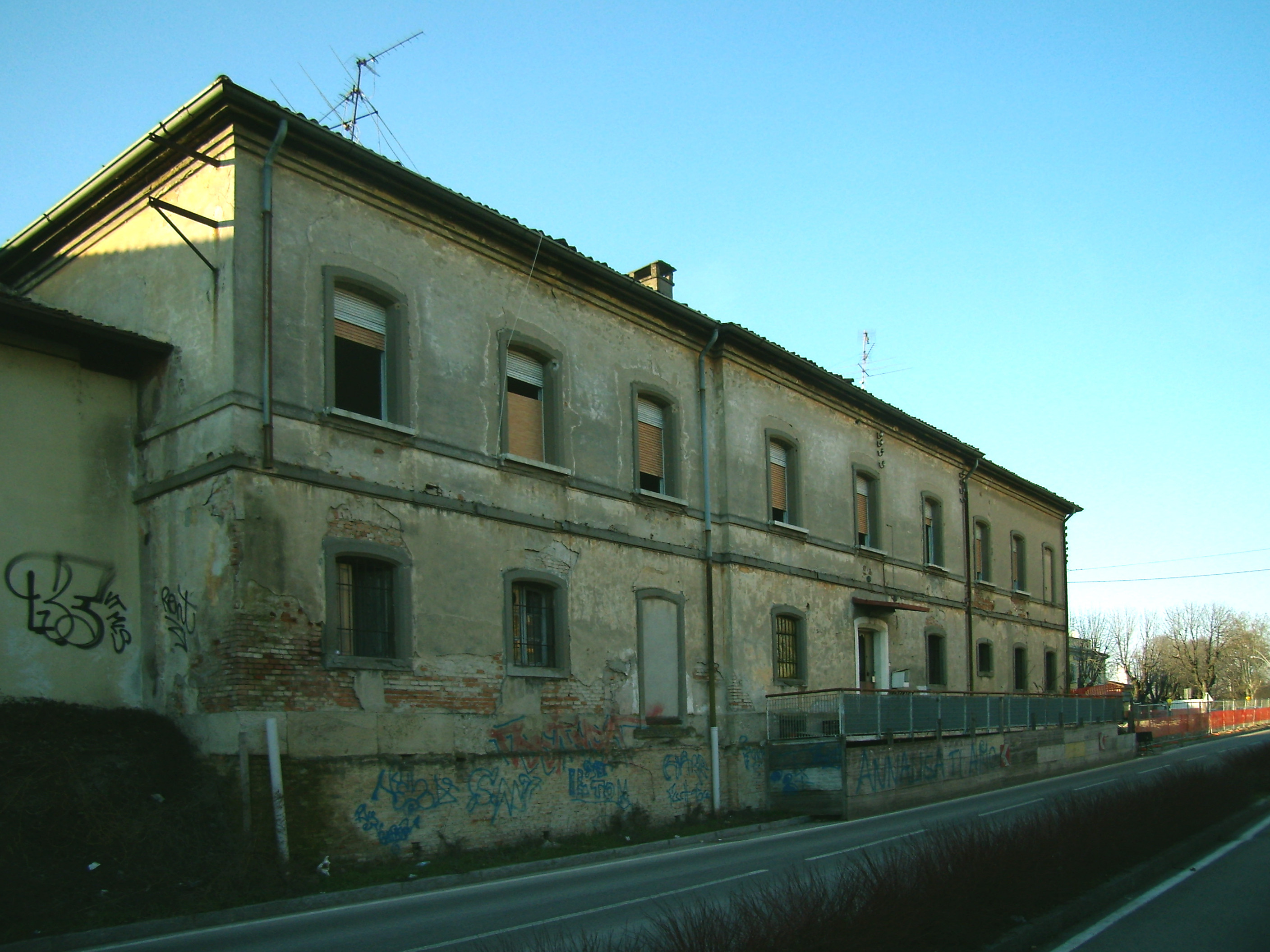
The second Treviglio station

The second station was located along the current Treviglio-Bergamo railway south of the current Treviglio Ovest station. Near this station is the old passenger building, which is now used as a residence for railway workers.

The Società delle ferrovie lombardo-venete had undertaken to complete the Milano–Venice railway under an agreement of 14 March 1856 This established the obligation to build the Monza–Bergamo–Brescia route instead of the direct one passing through Treviglio. For purely economic reasons, the Austrian company asked for and obtained the use of the existing section between Milan and Treviglio and then built a direct line between Treviglio and Bergamo. The new station was built on the new Treviglio–Bergamo–Coccaglio line, north-west of the town, and was opened on the day of its inauguration, while the old station was abandoned.

The management of this station passed to the Società delle Strade Ferrate della Lombardia e dell'Italia Centrale in 1860 and five years later to the Società per le Ferrovie dell'Alta Italia, which were different names of companies controlled by the Rothschild family.

The second station was closed in 1878 with the opening of the direct Treviglio–Rovato section and the consequent dismantling of the direct line between this station and Caravaggio, the latter replaced by a route passing through the town's new station. (Note: According to Giovanni Spinelli, the second Treviglio station was kept in operation at the request of the people of Bergamo for a few more years.)

== Passenger and train movements ==
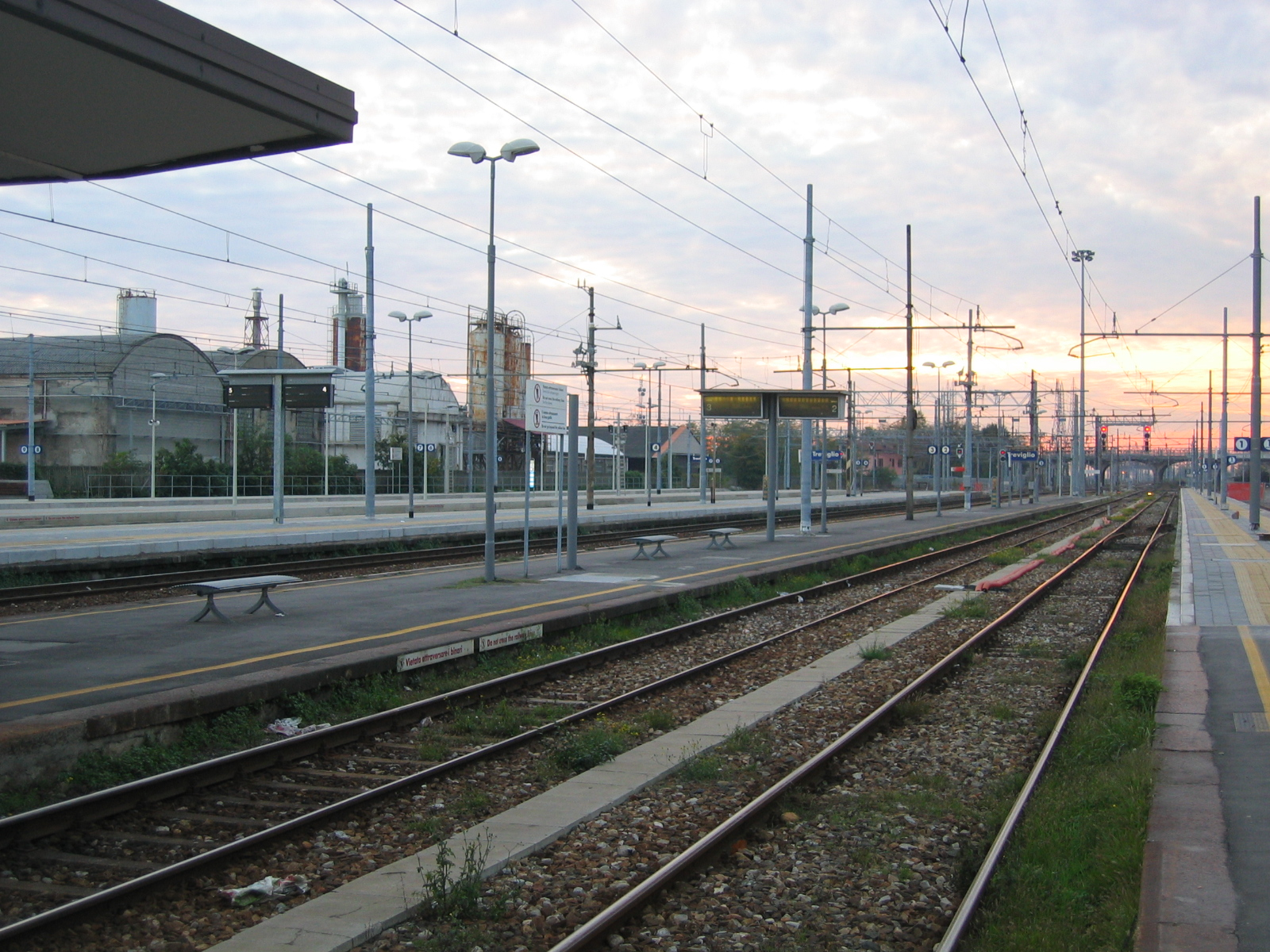
View of the station yard

The station has about 3.5 million passenger movements each year.

== Train services ==
The station is served by the following service(s):

- Express services (Treno regionale) Milan - Treviglio - Brescia - Verona
- Regional services (Treno regionale) Milan Greco - Treviglio - Brescia
- Regional services (Treno regionale) Bergamo - Treviglio
- Regional services (Treno regionale) Treviglio - Crema - Cremona
- Milan Metropolitan services (S5) Varese - Rho - Milan - Treviglio
- Milan Metropolitan services (S6) Novara - Rho - Milan - Treviglio

== Interchange ==
There is interchange at the station with suburban buses.

== See also ==
- History of rail transport in Italy
- List of railway stations in Lombardy
- Rail transport in Italy
- Railway stations in Italy
