= Como (disambiguation) =

Como is a city and comune of Lombardy, in Italy.

Como or COMO may also refer to:

== Places ==
=== Australia ===
- Como, New South Wales, a suburb of Sydney
- Como, Queensland, a suburb of the Sunshine Coast
- Como, Western Australia, a suburb of Perth

=== Italy ===
- Lake Como
- Province of Como

=== United States ===
- Como, Colorado
- Como, Illinois
- Como, Indiana
- Como, Minneapolis, Minnesota
- Como, Mississippi
- Como, Missouri, an unincorporated community
- Como, Nevada, a ghost town in Nevada
- Como, North Carolina
- Como Park, Saint Paul
- Como, Tennessee
- Como, Texas
- Como, Fort Worth, Texas, a neighborhood
- Como, Wisconsin
- Como, Wyoming
- Como Bluff, Wyoming, a famous dinosaur locality
- Como Township, Marshall County, Minnesota
- "CoMO", a nickname for the city of Columbia, Missouri

== Other uses ==
- Como (surname)
- COMO Hotels and Resorts
- Como Peaks (Montana), a mountain in United States
- Como 1907, an Italian football club
- Isuzu Como, a Japanese concept car
- A mobile development platform by Conduit

== See also ==
- Como railway station (disambiguation)
- COMOS, a plant engineering software from Siemens
- Comeaux
- Komo (disambiguation)
