= Como railway station =

Como railway station may refer to:

- Como railway station, Sydney, Australia
- Como Borghi railway station, Italy
- Como Camerlata railway station, Italy
- Como Nord Lago railway station, Italy
- Como San Giovanni railway station, Italy
