= Albate–Camerlata railway station =

Railway station in Italy

Albate–Camerlata
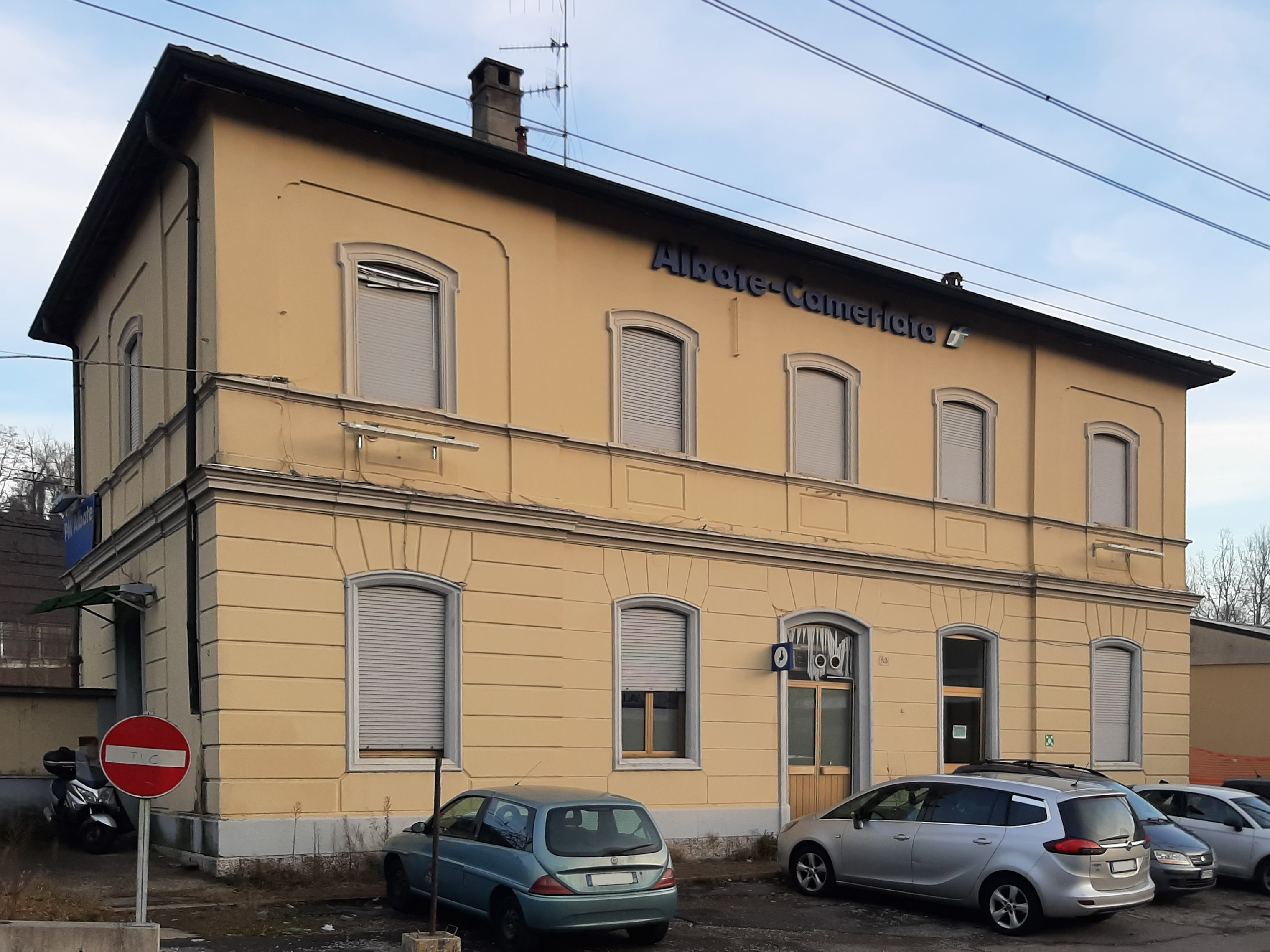
- The station building of the now closed station

General information
- Location: Via Scalabrini 83; Como, Como, Lombardy; Italy
- Coordinates: 45°46′37″N 09°04′23″E
- Elevation: 277
- Operator: Rete Ferroviaria Italiana
- Lines: Milan–Chiasso; Como–Lecco
- Distance: 41.679 km (25.898 mi) from Milano Centrale; 36.778 km (22.853 mi) from Lecco
- Train operators: Trenord

Other information
- Classification: bronze

History
- Closed: 2021
- Electrified: 1939

Former services
| Preceding station | Trenord | Following station |
|---|---|---|
| Como San Giovanni towards Chiasso | Line S11 (Milan suburban railway service) | Cucciago towards Rho |
Location
- Location within Northern Italy

Albate–Camerlata railway station was a railway station in Italy. Located on the Milan–Chiasso railway, it was a junction to the line to Lecco. It served Albate and Camerlata, southern suburbs of the city of Como.

== Services ==
Albate–Camerlata was served by the line S11 of the Milan suburban railway service and by the regional line Como–Molteno, both operated by the Trenord railway company. Since the time change on 13 June 2021, and the consequent opening of platforms 3 and 4 of the Como Camerlata station, the station has been closed.

== See also ==
- Milan suburban railway service
- Line S11 (Milan suburban railway service)
