= Como (surname) =

Como is the surname of the following people:

- Anna Como (fl. 1775), Danish ballerina
- Anthony Como (born 1974), American politician
- Emanuele da Como (1625–1701), Italian painter
- James Como, American writer
- Martino da Como, 15th-century Italian culinary expert
- Perry Como (1912–2001), American singer, actor and television personality
- Rossella Como (1939–1986), Italian actress and television personality
- Vincent Como (born 1975), American visual artist
- William Como (1925–1989), American journalist and magazine editor
