= Como Camerlata railway station =

Railway station in Italy

Como Camerlata
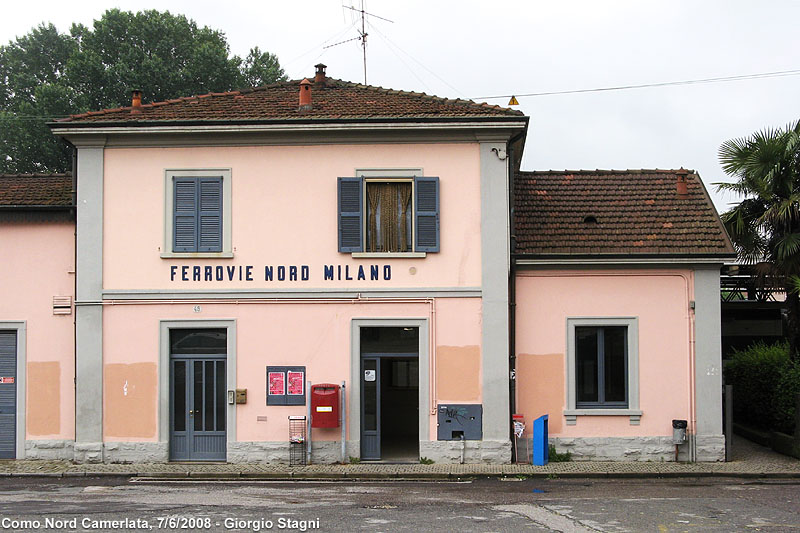
- The station building in 2008

General information
- Location: Como, Como, Lombardy; Italy
- Coordinates: 45°47′05″N 09°04′46″E
- Operator: Ferrovienord (north side); Rete Ferroviaria Italiana (south side)
- Lines: Milan–Chiasso; Como–Lecco; Saronno-Como (FN); Como-Varese (1885-1966)
- Train operators: Trenord

Other information
- Classification: bronze

Services
Preceding station	Trenord	Following station
Como San Giovanni towards Chiasso	Line S11 (Milan suburban railway service)	Cucciago towards Rho
Location
- Location within Northern Italy

Como Camerlata railway station is an interchange railway station between the Saronno-Como line (managed by Ferrovienord) and the Chiasso-Milano and Como-Lecco lines (managed by Rete Ferroviaria Italiana).

It serves the Camerlata and Rebbio districts of the city of Como. It is one of four stations in the city, the others being Como Borghi, Como Nord Lago and Como San Giovanni.

== Services ==
Since 13 June 2021, the station serves trains of Trenord S11, through a platform built along the adjacent Chiasso-Milano railway; as a result, Albate–Camerlata railway station was closed.

== See also ==
- Milan suburban railway service
- Line S11 (Milan suburban railway service)
