= Don Voisine =

American painter (born 1952)

Don Voisine (born 1952 in Fort Kent, Maine) is an American abstract painter living in the Williamsburg neighborhood of Brooklyn, New York, USA. In the fall of 2016, "X/V," a 15 year survey of his work, was organized by the Center for Maine Contemporary Art, Rockland, ME. In 1997 he was elected a member of American Abstract Artists and became President of the group in 2004. Voisine was elected to the National Academy in 2010. His work is included in the public collections of the Corcoran Gallery of Art, Washington, DC; Cincinnati Art Museum, Cincinnati, OH; Peabody Essex Museum, Salem MA; the Portland Museum of Art, Portland, ME; the Missoula Art Museum, Missoula, MT and the National Academy, New York, NY.

== Biography ==
Education
Rochester Institute of Technology, Rochester, NY
Haystack Mountain School of Crafts, Deer Isle, ME
Concept Center for Visual Studies, Portland, ME
Portland School of Art, Portland, ME

Solo and Two Person Exhibitions

2017 McKenzie Fine Art, New York, NY

Robischon Gallery, Denver, CO

2016 Center for Maine Contemporary Art, Rockland, ME “X/V,” (catalogue)

dr. julius | ap galerie, Berlin, Germany “Black Out: Don Voisine – Jan Maarten Voskuil”

Jeff Bailey Gallery, Hudson, NY

2015 McKenzie Fine Art, New York, NY

Robischon Gallery, Denver, CO

2014 Gregory Lind Gallery, San Francisco, CA “Cary Smith – Don Voisine” (catalogue)

Peter Blake Gallery, Laguna Beach, CA

Fred Giampietro Gallery, New Haven, CT

2013 MAT/tam 20, Spazio Isolo, Verona, Italy

dr. julius | ap galerie, Berlin, Germany “Criss Cross Straight Across: Gilbert Hsiao and Don Voisine”

McKenzie Fine Art, New York, NY

2012 Gregory Lind Gallery, San Francisco, CA

Alejandra von Hartz Gallery, Miami, FL

2011 McKenzie Fine Art, New York, NY

Icon Contemporary Art, Brunswick, ME

2010 New Arts Program Exhibition Space, Kutztown, PA
Northampton Community College, Bethlehem, PA
Reading Area Community College, Reading, PA

2009 McKenzie Fine Art, New York, NY (catalogue)
Gregory Lind Gallery, San Francisco, CA

2008 Icon Contemporary Art, Brunswick, ME

2007 McKenzie Fine Art, "Mark Dagley - Don Voisine"

2006 Abaton Garage, Jersey City, NJ
Metaphor Contemporary Art, Brooklyn, NY

2005 Icon Contemporary Art, Brunswick, ME

1998 Margaret Thatcher Projects, New York, NY
June Fitzpatrick Gallery, Portland, ME

1990 Deson Saunders Gallery, Chicago, IL

1988 Art Gallery, Kingsborough Community College, Brooklyn, NY "Katherine Bradford - Don Voisine"

1987 Marianne Deson Gallery, Chicago, IL

1985 Postmasters Gallery, New York, NY
22 Wooster Gallery, New York, NY

1982 Moming Arts Center, Chicago, IL

1980 80 Papers, New York, NY

Interviews

“Center for Maine Contemporary Art: Case Study: Interviews with Suzette McAvoy, Don Voisine and Lauren Henken,” the Finch.net, Richard Benari January 28, 2017

Animated Icons of Color – Don Voisine Visual Discrepancies, December 15, 2009

In Conversation: Don Voisine by Ben La Rocco and Craig Olson, Brooklyn Rail, June 2009

Don Voisine R-Value at Abaton Garage Chris Ashley Look, See, October 15, 2006

Bibliography
Green, Nancy. Catalogue for “Splendor of Dynamic Structure: Celebrating 75 Years of the American Abstract Artists,” Herbert F. Johnson Museum, Cornell University, Ithaca, NY 2011
Vartanian, Hrag. “Mail Art Bulletin: The Unlikely Mail Artist,” Hyperallergic (blog), June 16, 2011
Greenleaf, Ken. “Don Voisine’s careful placements at Icon,” The Portland Phoenix, September 21, 2011
Diehl, Carol. “Don Voisine,” Art in America, October 2011
MacAdam, Barbara. “American Abstract Artists,” Artnews, October 2011
Cohen, David. “Linda Francis, Don Voisine, Joan Waltemath, Michael Zahn,” Artcritical.com, April 2009
Goodrich, John. “Mark Dagley & Don Voisine,” The New York Sun, January 25, 2007
The Brooklyn Rail, “Art Seen - Review,” Michael Brennan, May 2006
New York Times, “Presentational Painting III,” Grace Glueck April 7, 2006
Artnet.Magazine, "Painting Presentation," Stephen Maine, April 7, 2006
New Arts Program/Berks Community Television, "Interview on New Arts Alive," with James F. L. Carroll, Reading, PA. February 28, 2006.
Village Voice, “Odd Artist Out, Chris Martin,” Jerry Saltz, October 12–18, 2005
NY Arts Magazine, “Living History,” Dan Keane, Nov/Dec 2005
Chronogram, “Abstract Thought” Beth E. Wilson, October 2005
New York Observer, “I See a Canvas and I Want It Painted Black,” Mario Naves, August 1, 2005
Portland Phoenix, “Fishlike Fish ‘Sublime Geometries: CMCA at Portland’ at June Fitzpatrick,” Chris Thompson, February 23, 2005
Maine Sunday Telegram, “Eye on collection, insight into collector’s eye,” Phillip Isaacson, December 5, 2004
Interview with Matthew Deleget, MINUS SPACE, November 2003. <www.minusspace.com/log/minusspace-voisine.htm>
The Brooklyn Rail, “The Painting Center Repetition In Discourse,” Daniel Baird, October - November 2001
Maine Times, “Unusually Abstract in Wiscasset,” Edgar Allen Beem, August 16, 2001
New York Times, “Inaugural Exhibition For Gallery In Beacon,“ D. Dominick Lombardi, April 22, 2001
New York Times, “Punk and Bloat,” Phyllis Braff, December 10, 2000
Review, “Review,” Dominique Nahas, Volume 3, Number 16 May 15, 1998
Maine Times, "The Ontological Status of Art and Aroostook,” Edgar Allan Beem, September 20, 1991
Art Space, "Reconstructivist Painting,” Peter Frank, March/April, 1990
Chicago Tribune, "Voisine Paintings Add Up as Assured Works", by Alan Artner, February 9, 1990
Kunstforum, "Rekonstruktivismus-Neomoderne Abstraktion in den Verenigten Staaten,” Peter Frank, Number 105, January/February 1990
Chicago Tribune, "New York Artists Have the Abstract Edge," David McCrackin, July 8, 1988
New Art Examiner, "Review,” Garrett Holg, May 1987
Chicago Tribune, "Don Voisine's Simple Geometry is Masterful," Alan Artner, March 20, 1987
Village Voice, "Art Picks,” Gary Indiana, March 19–25, 1986
New York Times, "City Without Walls - Objects of Comfort,” William Zimmer, April 14, 1985
Downtown Review, "Review," Katherine Bradford, Fall 1980
Art Speak, "Review," Palmer Poroner, September 11, 1980
Vision, "Grassroots-Concrete Roots,"Katherine Bradford, Lucy Lippard and Don Voisine, December 1978
Portland Evening Express, "Three Painters Exhibit," April 22, 1974

Catalogues
Greenleaf, Ken and McAvoy, Suzette. catalogue for X/V, Center for Maine Contemporary Art, Rockland, ME

Yau, John.catalogue essay for two person exhibition, "Don Voisine - Cary Smith" Gregory Lind Gallery, San Francisco, CA

FutureShock OneTwo Internationale Neue Konkrete +, Matthias Seidel(Editor) SURFACE Book, dr. julius | ap 2012
Golden, Deven. Catalogue essay for exhibition at McKenzie Fine Art, New York 2009
Long, Jim. “R-Value,” brochure essay for exhibition at Abaton Garage, Jersey City, NJ 2006
Presentational Painting III, Gabriele Evertz, John Cox and Abbey Ryan, 2006
Abstract Dilemmas: American Abstract Artists, Dr. Lori Verderamme, 2002
Punk & Bloat, Bill Arning, 2000
Toward The New: American Abstract Artists, Joan Webster Price, 2000
American Abstraction: 4 Currents, Peter Frank, 1985
Small Works; New Abstract Painting, Barbara Zabel and William Zimmer, 1984

Awards

2011 Purchase Prize, Portland Museum of Art, Portland, ME
Hassam, Speicher, Betts and Symons Purchase Fund Award, American Academy of Arts and Letters, New York, NY
2008 Henry Ward Ranger Fund Purchase Award, National Academy Museum, New York
2006 Artist’s Fellowship, New York Foundation for the Arts
2004 Edward Albee Fellowship, Montauk, NY
2000 Honorary BFA, Maine College of Art, Portland, ME
