= Voisine =

Voisine is a surname. Notable people with the surname include:

- Don Voisine (born 1952), American painter
- Roch Voisine (born 1963), Canadian singer-songwriter, actor, and radio and television host
