= Komo =

Komo or KOMO may refer to:

== Places ==
- Komo or Kommos (Crete), an ancient seaport
- Komo (department), a department of Estuaire Province in western Gabon
- Komo, Myanmar, a village in north-eastern Myanmar
- Komo, an island of the Lau Archipelago of Fiji
- Komo, Guinea-Bissau, a sector in Tombali Region
- Komo Rural LLG, Papua New Guinea

== Radio and TV stations ==
- KOMO-TV, Seattle, Washington television station
- KTTH, Seattle, Washington radio station, which held the KOMO call sign during part of 1926
- KNWN (AM), Seattle, Washington radio station, which held the KOMO call sign from 1926 until 2022
- KNWN-FM, Oakville, Washington radio station (97.7 FM), known as KOMO-FM from 2009 until 2022

== Other uses ==
- Komo people, an ethnic group who live along the Sudanese-Ethiopian border
- Komo language, a Nilo-Saharan language
- Komo (lute), a Hausa musical instrument of Niger and northern Nigeria
- Sam Komo, American politician

== See also ==
- Como (disambiguation)
