= Abbey Ryan =

American painter

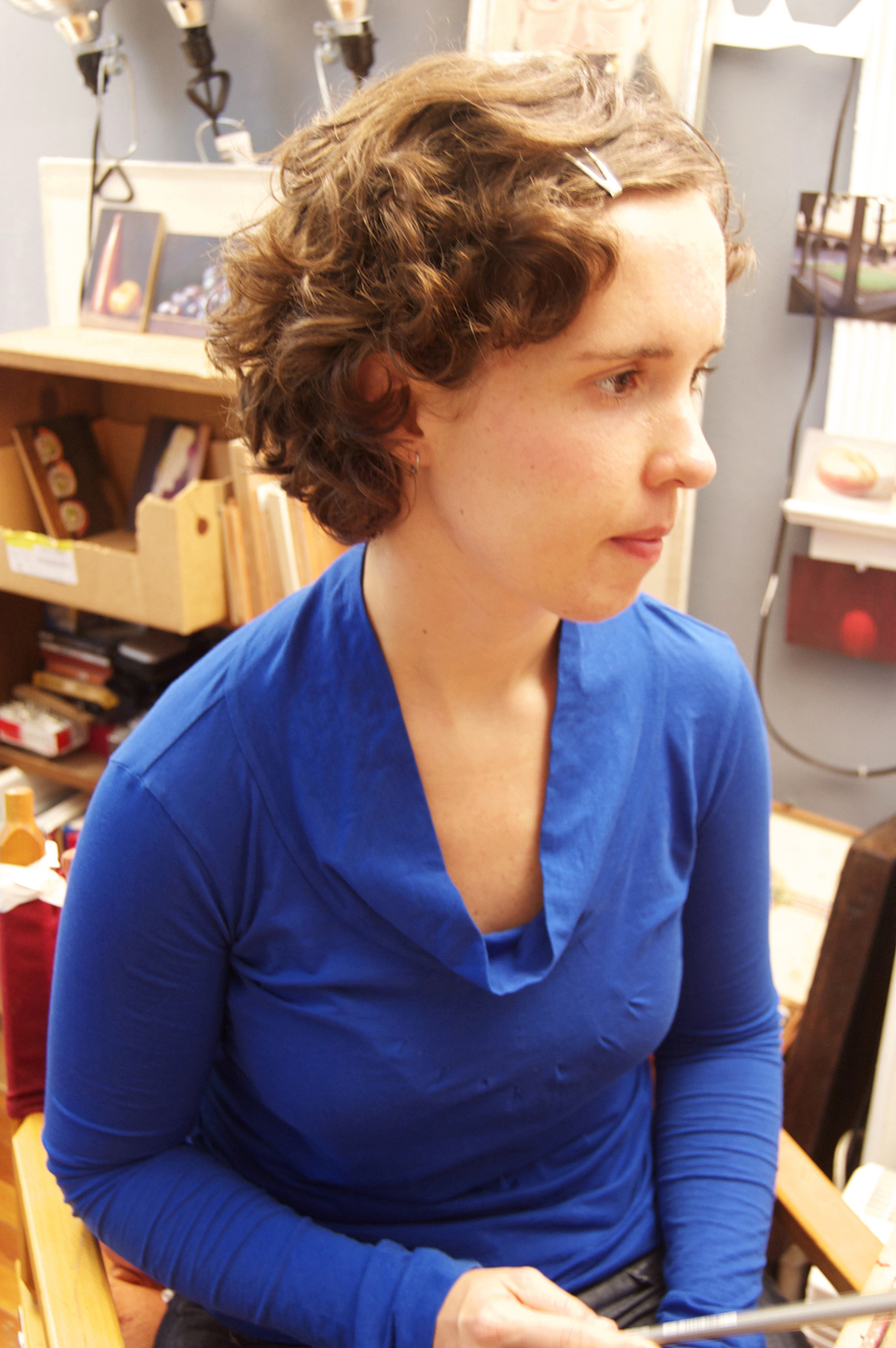
- Born: 1979 (age 46–47)
- Education: Art Students League of New York Hunter College Arcadia University
- Known for: Oil painting
- Style: Realism
- Movement: Classical Realism
- Website: www.abbeyryan.com

Abbey Ryan (born 1979, New Jersey) is a contemporary American painter and educator, best known for her representational, classical realism still life and trompe-l'œil paintings. Her work is inspired by 17th century Dutch still life painting. She lives and works in Philadelphia, Pennsylvania.

== Biography ==
A recognized leader in the "Painting-A-Day" movement, Ryan's work has been featured and reviewed in dozens of print and web publications, including Seth Godin's Linchpin, O, The Oprah Magazine, as part of the Women Who Make Beautiful Things section, Boing Boing, Good Day Philadelphia on WTXF, Yale Radio's The Art World Demystified, WYBC, Brainard Carey's Making It In the Art World, New Markets for Artists, and American Art Collector magazine. Ryan was named #5 on the list of "49 Creative Geniuses Who Use Blogging to Promote Their Art" by SmartBlogger.com. Ryan's work is held in over 2000 public and private collections all over the world.

== Education ==
In 2002, Ryan studied oil painting with contemporary master David A. Leffel at the Art Students League of New York. Ryan went on to receive bachelor's degrees in painting and scientific illustration at Arcadia University in 2003. She studied medical and biological illustration at The Johns Hopkins University School of Medicine, Department of Art as Applied to Medicine. Ryan then moved to New York, and earned a MFA in painting at Hunter College, City University of New York. She has studied and painted in the United States and abroad, including Italy, Spain, South Korea, Chile, Brazil, and Cuba.

== Work ==
Ryan started making daily paintings for her blog, Ryan Studio on September 23, 2007. About her work, Ryan writes, "painting has become my meditative time and the best part of my day. Attempting to paint every day speaks to my interest in ritual, practice, classical realist still life and trompe l'oeil painting." Ryan's work has been described as "exquisitely rendered, showcasing both excellent draftsmanship and painterly qualities. In fact, in nearly all of Ryan's paintings there are subtle details that shouldn't be overlooked." and "Abbey Ryan makes some of the most exquisite still life paintings you will ever see. Her background includes undergraduate and graduate degrees in both fine art and medicine, a combination that would have been understood and appreciated by such great Renaissance artists as da Vinci and Michelangelo."

== Teaching ==
Ryan is a painting instructor, known for her commitment to contemplative and mindful studio practice, and alla prima painting from life. She teaches studio art at Arcadia University as a Professor of Visual and Performing Arts, as well as professional painting seminars at the John F. Peto Studio Museum and Falmouth Arts Center.

== Live painting demonstrations ==
Ryan conducts live painting demonstrations, a practice reminiscent of the publicly visible Renaissance workshops that traditionally lined the Ponte Vecchio since at least the 12th century. For approximately two hours, she completes a painting from start to finish in front of a live audience and streamed live online. The recording is then compressed into a short time lapse video. In 2011, Ryan's live demo was broadcast on FOX 29's Good Day Philadelphia. Her live demonstrations are typically donation events with the painting auctioned as a fundraiser for various causes.

== Catalogues ==
In 2006, Ryan assisted Hunter College professor of art Gabriele Evertz in curating Presentational Painting III, February 16-April 15, 2006, The Hunter College/Times Square Gallery, 450 West 41st Street, New York, NY 10036. Ryan wrote all texts on exhibition artists, including Don Voisine, Matthew Deleget (co-founder of Minus Space), Hartmut Bohm, Paul Corio, Daniel Crews, Lynne Harlow, Gilbert Hsiao, Changha Hwang, Susanne Jung, Steve Karlik, Rossana Martinez, Charlotte Nicholson, Francisca Reyes, Steven Salzman, Martijn Schuppers, and Mike Stack. 63 pages. Catalogue ISBN 1885998716.

== Scientific illustration ==
In 2001, Ryan completed a scientific Illustration Internship at the Carnegie Institution of Washington, Department of Plant Biology, Stanford University, Stanford, CA. She did volunteer work and scientific illustration work at Pohnpei Agriculture and Trade School (PATS), Pohnpei, Micronesia and the Marine Science and SCUBA Study at Marine and Environmental Research Institute, Pohnpei, Micronesia. In 2004, Ryan worked as a Botanical Illustrator in collaboration with Dr. Chris Somerville at the Carnegie Institution of Washington, Department of Plant Biology, Stanford University, Stanford, California.

== Professional memberships ==
- Oil Painters of America
- International Guild of Realism
- American Artists Professional League
- American Women Artists, Associate with Distinction
- National Oil and Acrylic Painters' Society
- Daily Paintworks
