= Cantù–Cermenate railway station =

Railway station in Lombardy, Italy

Cantù–Cermenate
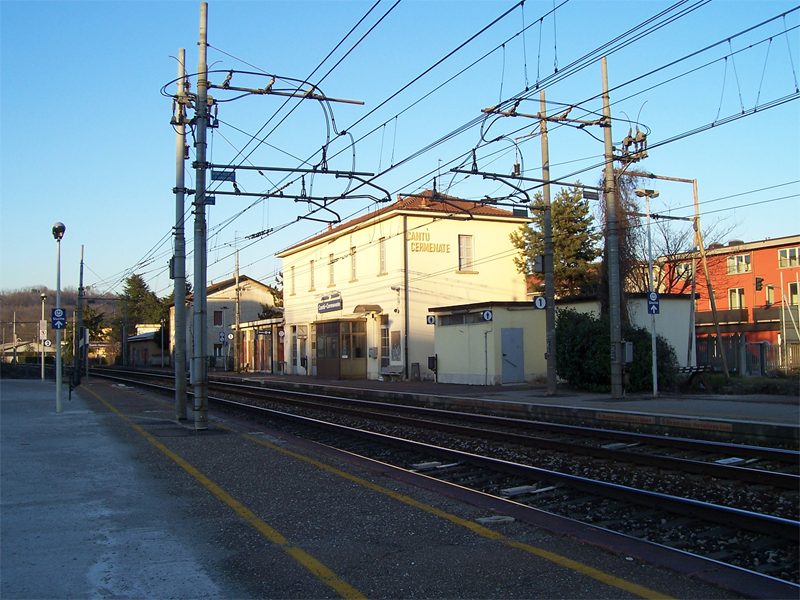

General information
- Location: Piazza Stazione; Cantù, Como, Lombardy; Italy
- Coordinates: 45°42′58″N 09°05′58″E
- Operator: Rete Ferroviaria Italiana
- Line: Milan–Chiasso
- Distance: 34.171 km (21.233 mi) from Milano Centrale
- Platforms: ?
- Train operators: Trenord

Other information
- Classification: silver

History
- Opened: ?
- Electrified: 1939

Services
Preceding station	Trenord	Following station
Cucciago towards Chiasso	Line S11 (Milan suburban railway service)	Carimate towards Rho
Location
- Location within Lombardy Location within Northern Italy Location within Italy

Cantù–Cermenate railway station is a railway station in Italy. Located on the Milan–Chiasso railway, it serves the towns of Cantù and Cermenate.

== Services ==
Cantù–Cermenate is served by the line S11 of Milan suburban railway service, operated by the lombard railway company Trenord.

== See also ==
- Milan suburban railway service
