= Carimate railway station =

Railway station in Italy

Carimate
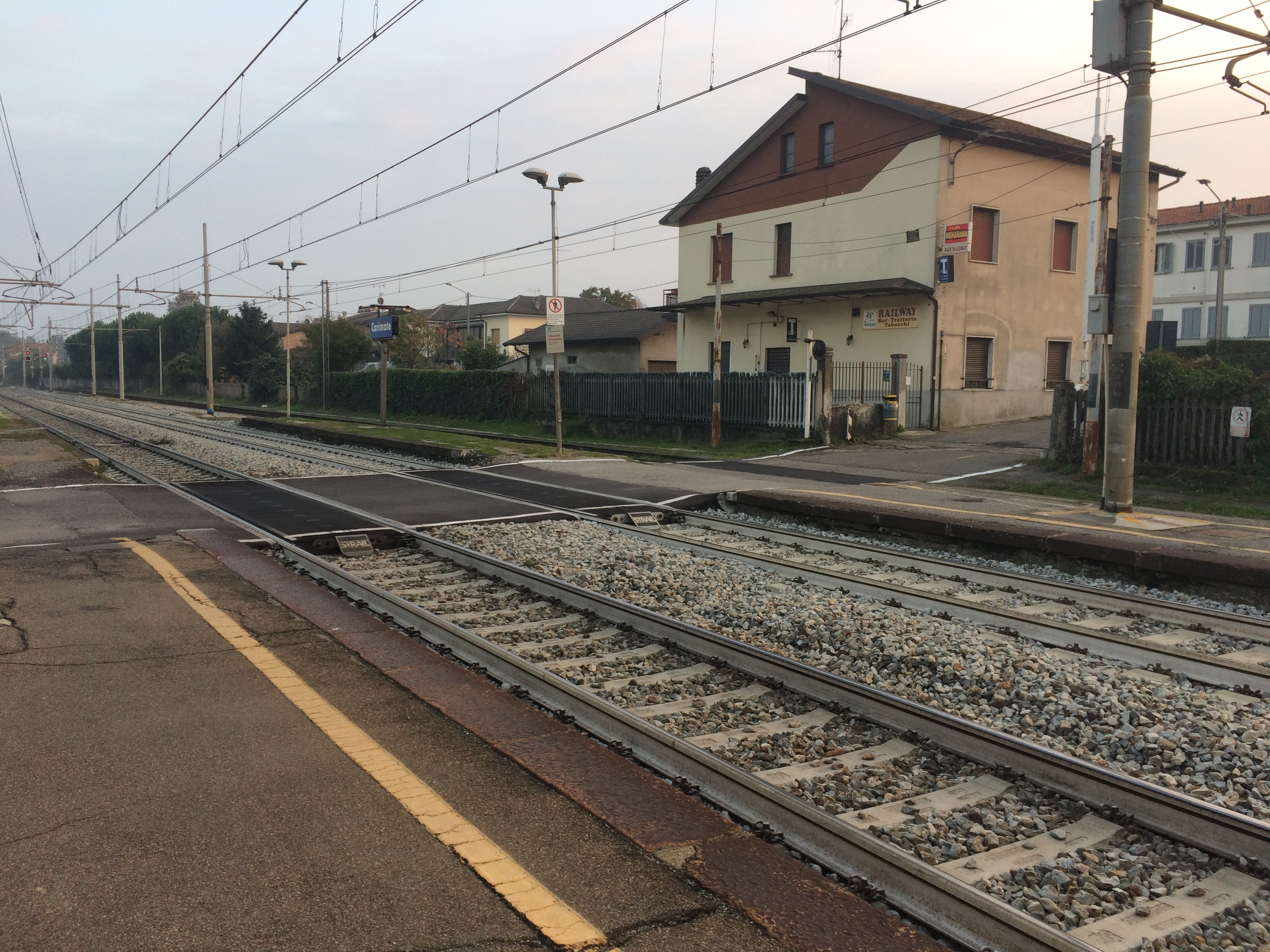

General information
- Location: Via Stazione, 26; Carimate, Como, Lombardy; Italy
- Coordinates: 45°41′50″N 09°06′26″E
- Operator: Rete Ferroviaria Italiana
- Line: Milan–Chiasso
- Distance: 31.764 km (19.737 mi) from Milano Centrale
- Train operators: Trenord

Other information
- Classification: silver

History
- Electrified: 1939

Services
Preceding station	Trenord	Following station
Cantù–Cermenate towards Chiasso	Line S11 (Milan suburban railway service)	Camnago–Lentate towards Rho
Location
- Location within Lombardy Location within Northern Italy Location within Italy

Carimate railway station is a railway station in Italy. Located on the Milan–Chiasso railway, it serves the town of Carimate.

== Services ==
Carimate is served by the line S11 of Milan suburban railway service, operated by the lombard railway company Trenord.

== See also ==
- Milan suburban railway service
