= Como, Australia =

Como, Australia may refer to:

- Como, New South Wales, a suburb of Sydney
- Como, Queensland, a suburb of the Sunshine Coast
- Como, Western Australia, a suburb of Perth

== See also ==
- Como (disambiguation)
