= Alfred Doten =

American journalist (1829–1903)

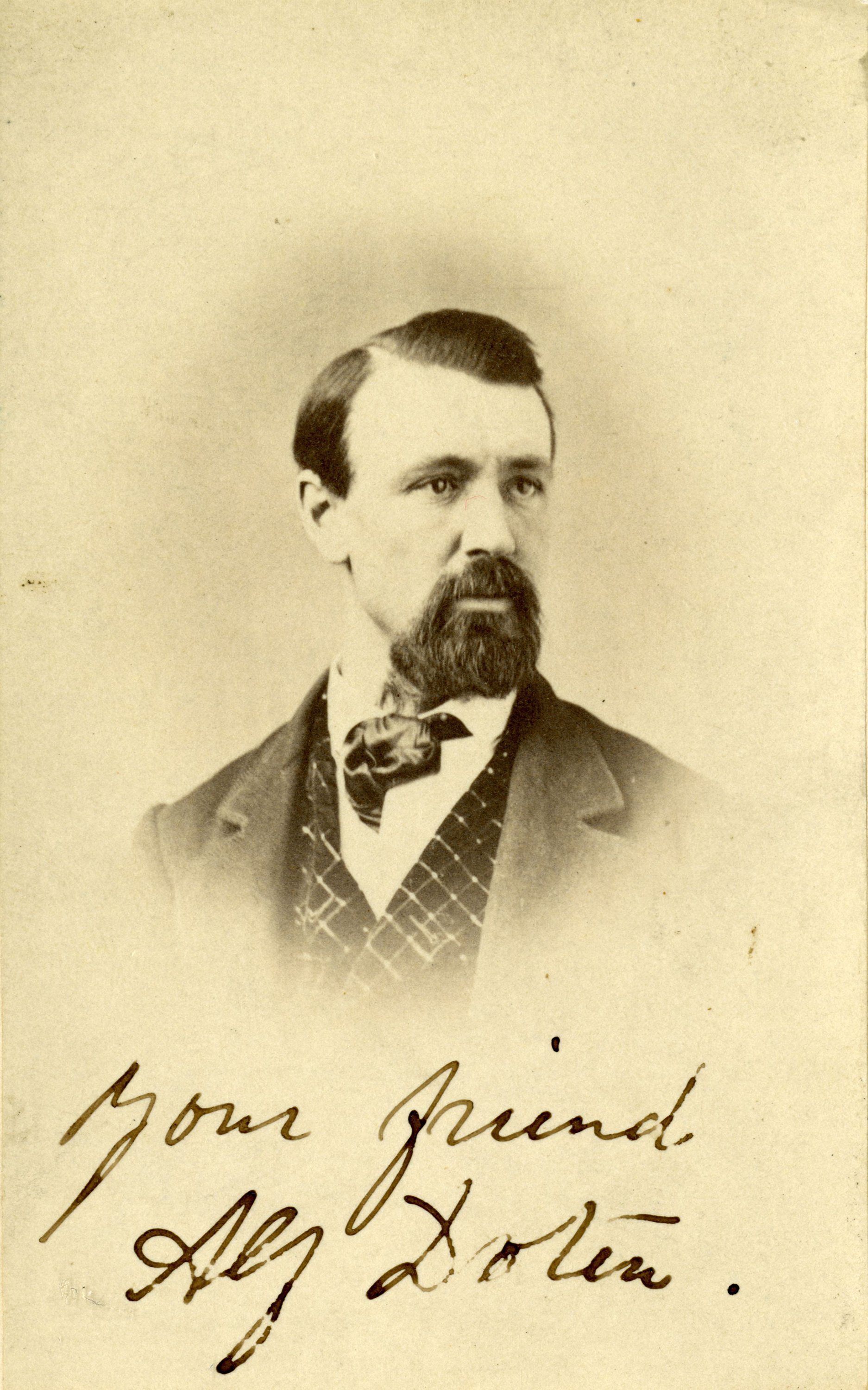
- Alfred Doten, 1866
- Born: July 21, 1829; Plymouth, Massachusetts, U.S.
- Died: November 12, 1903 (aged 74); Carson City, Nevada, U.S.
- Resting place: Hillside Cemetery, Reno, Nevada, U.S.
- Occupations: Journalist, diarist
- Spouse: Mary S. Doten
- Children: 4

Alfred Doten (July 21, 1829 - November 12, 1903) was an American journalist and diarist, and "the dean of the newspaper men of Nevada."

== Life ==
Born in Plymouth, Massachusetts in 1829, he went west to try his luck in the California Gold Rush in 1849. He became a journalist for the Como Sentinel in Como, Nevada in 1863, the editor of the Virginia Daily Union in 1864, an editorial writer for the Virginia Enterprise in 1866, and subsequently the editor of the Gold Hill Daily News. By the time of his death in 1903, he had become known as "the dean of the newspaper men of Nevada."

His diary was edited by Walter Van Tilburg Clark and published posthumously in 1973.

His sister, Lizzie Doten, was a well-known writer and spiritualist. She visited him in Nevada in 1889, the first time they had seen each other in 40 years.

== Works ==
- Doten, Alfred (1973). Van Tilburg Clark, Walter (ed.). The Journals of Alfred Doten, 1849-1903. Reno, Nevada: University of Nevada Press. ISBN 9780874170320. OCLC 1039486527.
