= Giuseppe Maria Galeppini =

Italian baroque painter (active 1630–1650)

Giuseppe Maria Galeppini (active 1630–1650) was an Italian painter of the Baroque style active in Forli, Modena, and Bologna. He is said to have been a pupil of Guercino. He is said to have been murdered in Bologna. A painting in the church of San Giorgio e dell'Immacolata Concezione in Carimate is attributed to Galeppini.

== Bibliography ==
- E. Casadei, Forlì e dintorni, Società Tipografica Forlivese, Forlì 1928, pp. 250–251.
- La Pinacoteca civica di Forli, curated by Giordano Viroli, Cassa dei Risparmi di Forli, Forlì 1980, pp. 238–240.
