= Line S11 (Milan suburban railway service) =

Railway line in Milan, Italy

Como San Giovanni–Rho
- S11
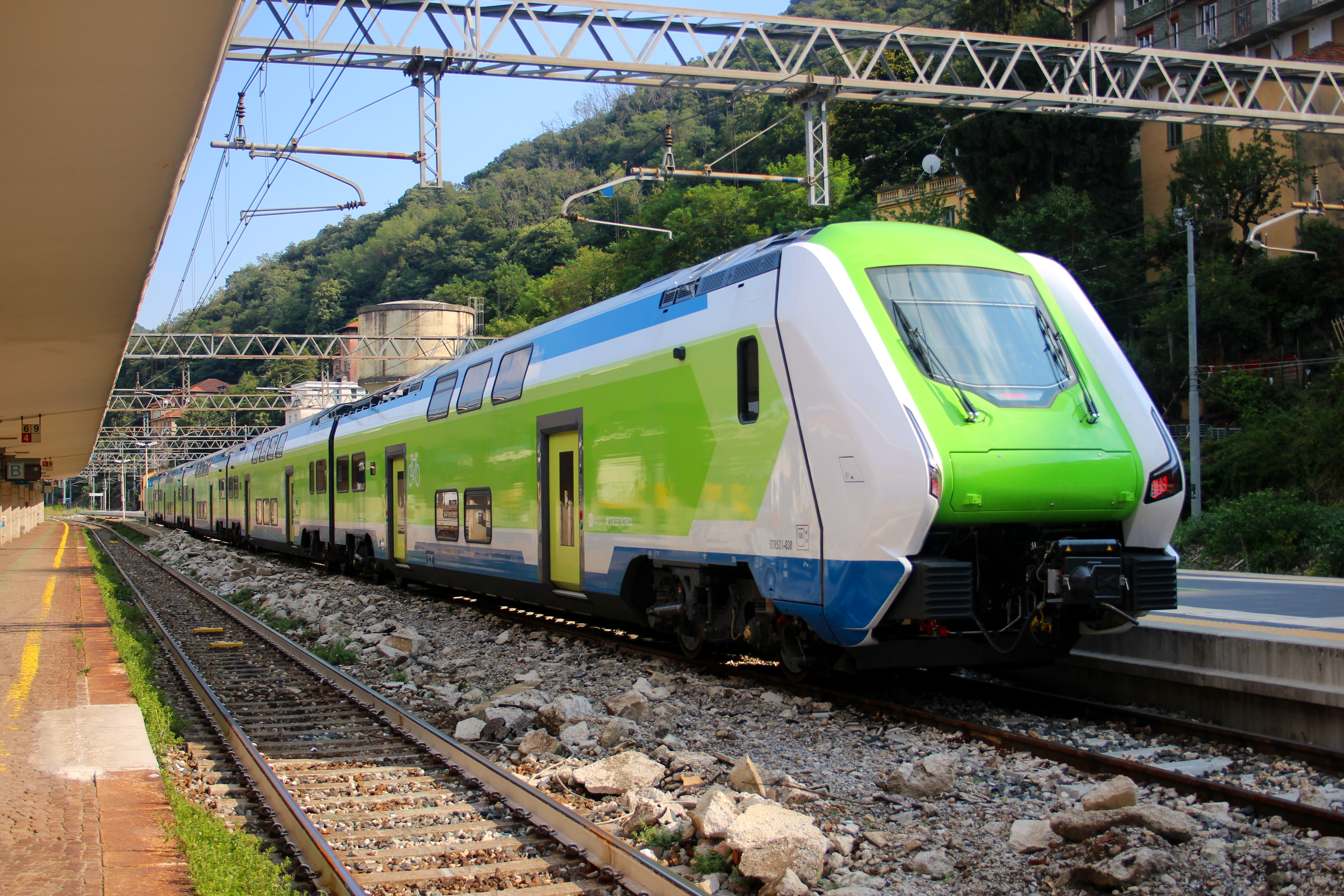
- An S11 train at Como San Giovanni railway station

Overview
- Status: Operational
- Locale: Milan, Italy
- Termini: Como; Rho
- Stations: 17
- Website: S11 Como - Milano - Rho

Service
- Type: Commuter rail
- System: Milan suburban railway service
- Route number: S11
- Rolling stock: Caravaggio

History
- Opened: 2008 (Regional rail); 2009 (Suburban rail)

Technical
- Track gauge: 1,435 mm (4 ft 8 1/2 in)
- Electrification: 3,000 V DC
Route map
Map of line S11.

The S11 is a commuter rail route forming part of the Milan suburban railway service (Italian: Servizio ferroviario suburbano di Milano), which converges on the city of Milan, Italy.

The route runs over the infrastructure of the Milan–Chiasso railway. Like all but one of the other Milan suburban railway service routes, it is operated by Trenord.

== Route ==
- Como San Giovanni ↔ Milano Porta Garibaldi ↔ Rho

Line S11, a radial route, heads initially in an southeasterly direction from Chiasso in Switzerland over the border to Como San Giovanni, and then south, to Camnago-Lentate. From there, it turns southeast towards Monza, and finally southwest, to Milano Porta Garibaldi. From 26 April 2015, has been extended to the station of Rho due to the start of Expo 2015 on 1 May 2015; currently, trains run hourly respectively between Rho and Como San Giovanni or between Milano Porta Garibaldi and Chiasso, for a combined half-hourly service between Como San Giovanni and Milano Porta Garibaldi on the S11.

== History ==
The route was activated on 14 December 2008, and was initially an hourly regional rail service between its two termini, although it was designated at Chiasso station as the S11.

On 13 December 2009, the Italian part of the route was reclassified as the S11 suburban rail line.

On 26 April 2015, has been extended to Rho.

== Stations ==
The stations on the S11 are as follows (the stations with a coloured background are within the municipality of Milan):

Station	Opened	Interchange	Note
Como San Giovanni	1875	S10 S40	
Como Camerlata	1875	S10 S40	
Cucciago	1849		
Cantù-Cermenate			
Carimate			
Camnago-Lentate	1849	Line S4 (Milan suburban railway service)	
Seregno	1849	Treni regionali	
Desio	1849	Line S9 (Milan suburban railway service)	
Lissone-Muggiò	1882	Line S9 (Milan suburban railway service)	
Monza	1840	Treni regionali	
Sesto San Giovanni	1969	Line M1 Treni regionali	
Milano Greco Pirelli	1914	Treni regionali	
Milano Porta Garibaldi	1963	MXP	
Milano Villapizzone	2002	Line S5 (Milan suburban railway service) Line S6 (Milan suburban railway service)	limited service
Milano Certosa	1858	Treni regionali	limited service
Rho Fiera	2008	Line M1 Treni regionali	limited service
Rho	1858	Treni regionali	limited service

== Scheduling ==
As of 2023, S11 trains run half-hourly between Milano Porta Garibaldi and Como San Giovanni Monday to Sunday, with one train per hour serving alternatively up to Rho (from Milano Porta Garibaldi) or up to Chiasso (from Como San Giovanni).

== See also ==
- History of rail transport in Italy
- List of Milan suburban railway stations
- Rail transport in Italy
- Transport in Milan
