= Novedrate =

Novedrate Novedraa (Lombard)
- Comune
- Comune di Novedrate
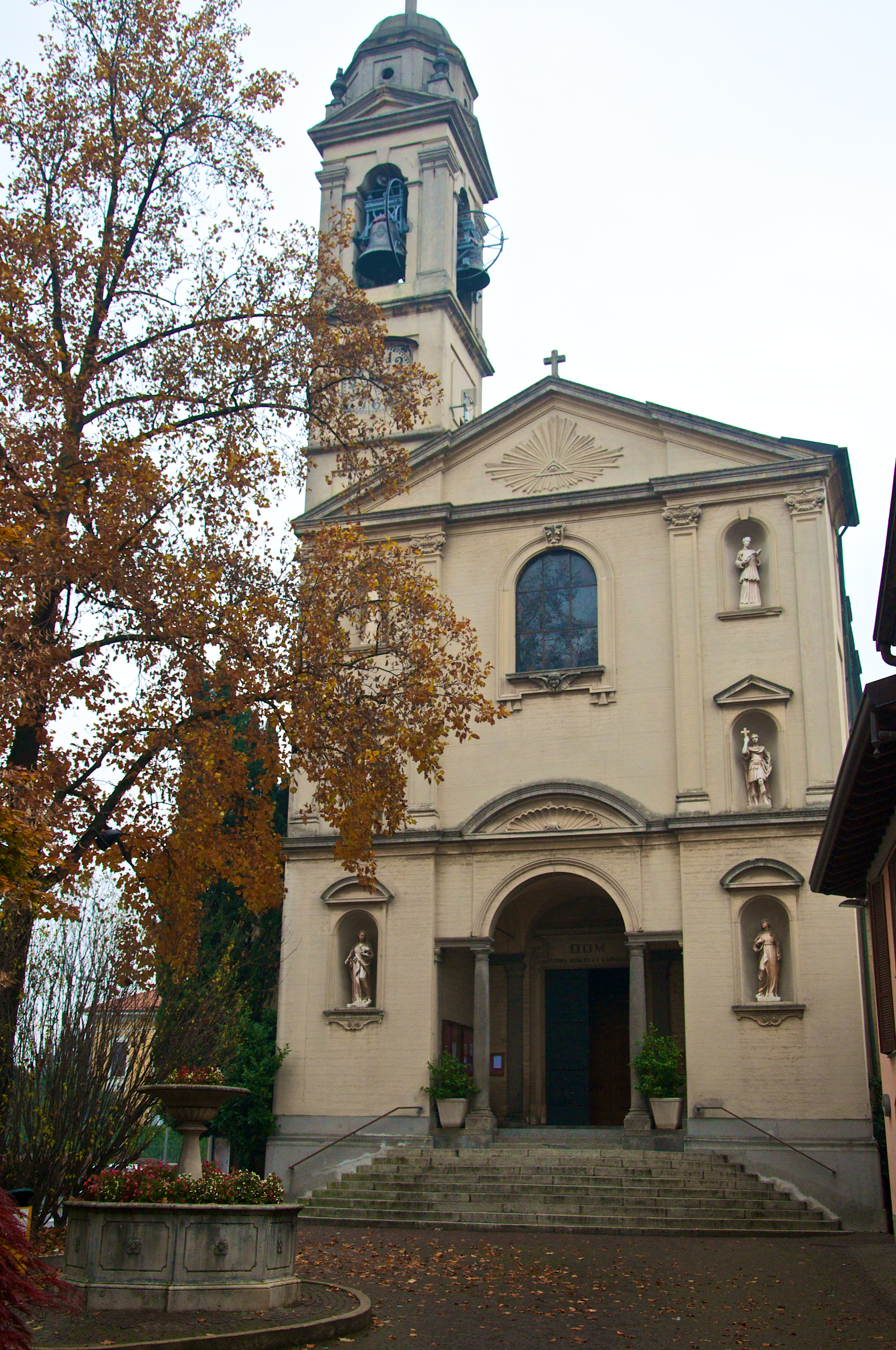
- Church of Santi Donato e Carpoforo

- Location within Italy Location within Lombardy
- Coordinates: 45°42′N 9°7′E
- Country: Italy
- Region: Lombardy
- Province: Como (CO)
- Frazioni: Villaggio San Giuseppe

Area
  - Total: 2.8 km^{2} (1.1 sq mi)

Population (Dec. 2004)
  - Total: 2,950
  - Density: 1,100/km^{2} (2,700/sq mi)
- Demonym: Novedratesi
- Time zone: UTC+1 (CET)
  - Summer (DST): UTC+2 (CEST)
- Postal code: 22060
- Dialing code: 031
- Website: Official website

Novedrate (Brianzöö: Novedraa [nuʋeˈdraː]) is a comune (municipality) in the Province of Como in the Italian region Lombardy, located about 25 kilometres (16 mi) north of Milan and about 13 kilometres (8 mi) south of Como. As of 31 December 2004, it had a population of 2,950 and an area of 2.8 km^{2} (1.1 sq mi).

== Geography ==
Novedrate borders the following municipalities: Carimate, Figino Serenza, Lentate sul Seveso and Mariano Comense. Its frazione is Villaggio San Giuseppe.

== Demographic evolution ==
Historical population

| Year | Pop. | ±% |
|---|---|---|
| 1861 | 848 | — |
| 1871 | 921 | +8.6% |
| 1881 | 912 | −1.0% |
| 1901 | 940 | +3.1% |
| 1911 | 1,058 | +12.6% |

| Year | Pop. | ±% |
|---|---|---|
| 1921 | 1,068 | +0.9% |
| 1931 | 1,054 | −1.3% |
| 1936 | 1,080 | +2.5% |
| 1951 | 1,223 | +13.2% |
| 1961 | 1,654 | +35.2% |

| Year | Pop. | ±% |
|---|---|---|
| 1971 | 1,786 | +8.0% |
| 1981 | 2,180 | +22.1% |
| 1991 | 2,566 | +17.7% |
| 2001 | 2,889 | +12.6% |

Source: Data from ISTAT

== Media ==
Ho scoperto che Pasquale forse è nato a Cefalù, si è sposato a Novedrate, è un bravo elettricista, fuma poco e ascolta i Pooh

— Pino Daniele, 'O scarrafone

The town was cited in the song 'O scarrafone (Un uomo in blues, 1991) by Pino Daniele, as one of many places in which Southern Italians emigrate in Northern Italy.
