= Lynne Harlow =

American artist (born 1968)

Lynne Harlow (b.1968 Attleboro, MA) is an artist who creates sculptural installations of color, light and space.

== Major exhibitions ==
Harlow has exhibited her work nationally and internationally for the past decade, including in the United States, Mexico, France, Germany, Italy, Norway, Australia, New Zealand, and Japan. Harlow was included in the 2013 deCordova Biennial at the deCordova Museum and Sculpture Park.

Harlow's other recent exhibitions include MINUS SPACE, MoMA PS1, Herbert F. Johnson Museum of Art, Brattleboro Museum of Art + Art Center, and Instituto de Artes Gráficas de Oaxaca.

== Public collections ==
Harlow's work is included in public collections, such as The Museum of Modern Art; RISD Museum, Art in Embassies, and Hunter College.

== Awards and nominations ==
She has received awards from the Chinati Foundation, Rhode Island Foundation, and BAU Institute, and her work has been reviewed in Artforum, The New York Times, The Boston Globe, The Providence Journal, and Artnet Magazine. Her installation BEAT, which premiered at MINUS SPACE in 2007, was highlighted in Artforum's Best of 2012 issue (Thomas Crow's review of Notations: The Cage Effect Today, Hunter College/Times Square Gallery.
