= Lizzie Doten =

American spiritualist writer (1827–1913)

Portrait of Lizzie Doten

Elizabeth "Lizzie" Doten (April 1, 1827 – January 15, 1913) was an American poet and a prominent spiritualist lecturer and trance speaker and writer who received special attention for her supposed ability to channel poetry from Edgar Allan Poe after his death. She wrote poetry, fiction, and essays and edited an annual spiritualist publication, Lily of the Valley. She was active on the lecture circuit between 1864 and 1880.

== Family and early life ==
Elizabeth Doten was born in Plymouth, Massachusetts, the seventh of nine children. Both her parents were Mayflower descendants: Her father Samuel’s ancestor was Edward Doty, and her mother Rebecca was descended from William Bradford, the Pilgrim governor of Plymouth Colony. Her brothers, Major Samuel Doten (1812–1906) and Captain Charles Doten (1833–1918) led the first two Union companies to deploy from Plymouth in the Civil War. Another brother, Alfred Doten (1829–1903) left for the California gold fields on a sailing ship in 1849 and later became a journalist in Nevada. He is best known for his intimate daily journals chronicling Western American life in the last half of the 19th century.

Lizzie Doten (she exclusively used the name Lizzie Doten, never Elizabeth, in her professional life) was educated in Plymouth public schools before spending a year in a private school in Plymouth at the age of 17. She reported to have had psychic experiences as a child, leading to a lifelong interest in Spiritualism. She also wrote poetry as a child. In the lengthy introduction to her first book of poetry, Poems of the Inner Life, she described the mystical experiences in her childhood that shaped her life, and later her “passive surrender to the inspirations that moved upon me – I have held conscious communion with disembodied spirits.” She went on to describe the nature of the mental and physical effects of this communion. She reported that some of the poems in her book were dictated by Edgar Allan Poe, William Shakespeare, Robert Burns, and one came to her as a prophecy of the fate (unknown at the time she wrote the poem) of the Arctic explorers under Sir John Franklin.

== Professional life ==
As Doten matured, she expressed strong criticism of orthodox Christianity and organized religion in the defense of Spiritualism. She did not conduct private sessions as a medium, but she advocated for the rights of mediums. At the same time she protested against their organization, the American Association of Spiritualists, on feminist and antiauthoritarian grounds, although she sometimes participated in their conventions. In her activities, she believed it was important to maintain her principles.

During her lectures, Doten would speak about her religious philosophy and about women’s rights and other social reforms. She championed the cause of equal pay for women and often spoke out against marriage as a means of survival. She frequently spoke at the Melodeon or under the auspices of the Lyceum in Boston, entering into extemporaneous trance speaking. Her entry in the Encyclopaedia of Psychic Science describes her as “greatest and best improvisatrice of the XIX Century.” She would generally end her lectures by reciting a poem, seemingly dictated from beyond the grave.

== Later life ==
Doten published her last book in 1871, and she retired from speaking in 1880, ostensibly for health reasons; however, according to at least one source, “Miss Doten withdrew from the lecture field and mediumistic work by reason of the fact that she had become unable to determine the point at which her personality ceased to act and the agency of spirit influence began.”

In 1902, at the age of 75, Doten married her long-time companion Z. (Zabdiel) Adams Willard (1826–1918). It was her first marriage and his second, after the death of his first wife, Lucy, in 1901.

During the 1880s she spent time with the Willards in Calaveras County, California, where he owned the Oro y Plata quartz, silver and gold mine, and invented mining processes and equipment. Until 1870, Willard had worked in his family firm in Boston, Simon Willard Clocks.

After their marriage, the Willards lived in Brookline, Massachusetts. Lizzie Doten Willard died on January 15, 1913, at the age of 85. She lies buried in the Willard family plot at Mount Auburn Cemetery.

== Selected publications ==
- Doten, Lizzie. The Haunted Church, or The Little Organ Girl. Boston, J.M.Usher, 1852.
- Doten, Lizzie. Hesper, the Home-Spirit: A Simple Story of Household Labor and Love. Boston : Abel Tompkins, c1858.
- Doten, Lizzie. Poems from the Inner Life. Boston:'William White and Co., 1864.
- Doten, Lizzie. Review of a Lecture by Jas. Freeman Clarke on the Religions Philosophy of Ralph Waldo Emerson. Boston: William White and Company, 1865.
- Doten, Lizzie. "Free Love and Affinity: A Discourse Delivered Under Spirit Influence at the Melodean, Boston” Boston: Bela Marsh, 1867.
- Doten, Lizzie. My Affinity and Other Stories. Boston, 1870.
- Doten, Lizzie. Poems of Progress. Boston: Colby and Rich, 1871.
