= Chiesa di San Giorgio e dell'Immacolata Concezione =

Building in Carimate, Italy

Coordinates: 45.70181°N 9.11467°E

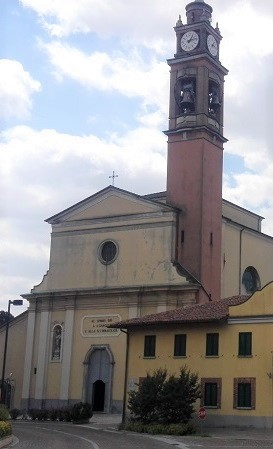
Chiesa san giorgio e maria immacolata carimate.jpg

The Church of St George and the Immaculate Conception is the Roman Catholic parish church of Carimate, province of Como, Lombardy, northern Italy.

== History ==
A church at the site dedicated to St George Martyr had been present since the 14th century. The church had a single nave and one chapel. It was enlarged over the next centuries, but completely rebuilt over the ruins of the earlier church in 1752 to 1755, and rededicated to San Giorgio martire and the Virgin of the Immaculate Conception, whose veneration was growing by this period. The belltower was added in 1932, to replace once erected in 1891, which itself replaced the 14th-century tower that had been razed in the 1750s enlargement of the church.

The interior now contains a number of canvases, including a major work of Stefano Maria Legnani, depicting St Joseph and the Child Jesus with attendant angels (1693). This work was originally painted for the former church of San Marcellino in Milan, but came into the possession of the Brera Academy, and was place at Carimate in 1815 upon request of the parish priest for four works to embellish the church. The church has a chapel dedicated to St Carlo Borromeo (died 1610), with an altarpiece depicting the then-recently canonized bishop of Milan by Giovanni Battista Crespi (1575-1632). Finally, up high in the choir and organ loft, near the organ, is a canvas depicting St Elizabeth in Ecstasy. This painting was moved to Carimate in 1815 from the Brera Academy, who had obtained the painting from the suppressed church of the Capuchin order of Forlì. The work is attributed to a Giuseppe Maria Galeppini.

The organ was built in 1761 by Antonio Fontana of Milan. In 1837, the instrument was refurbished by the brothers Prestinari of Magenta.
