= Como Borghi railway station =

Railway station in Como, Italy

Como Nord Borghi
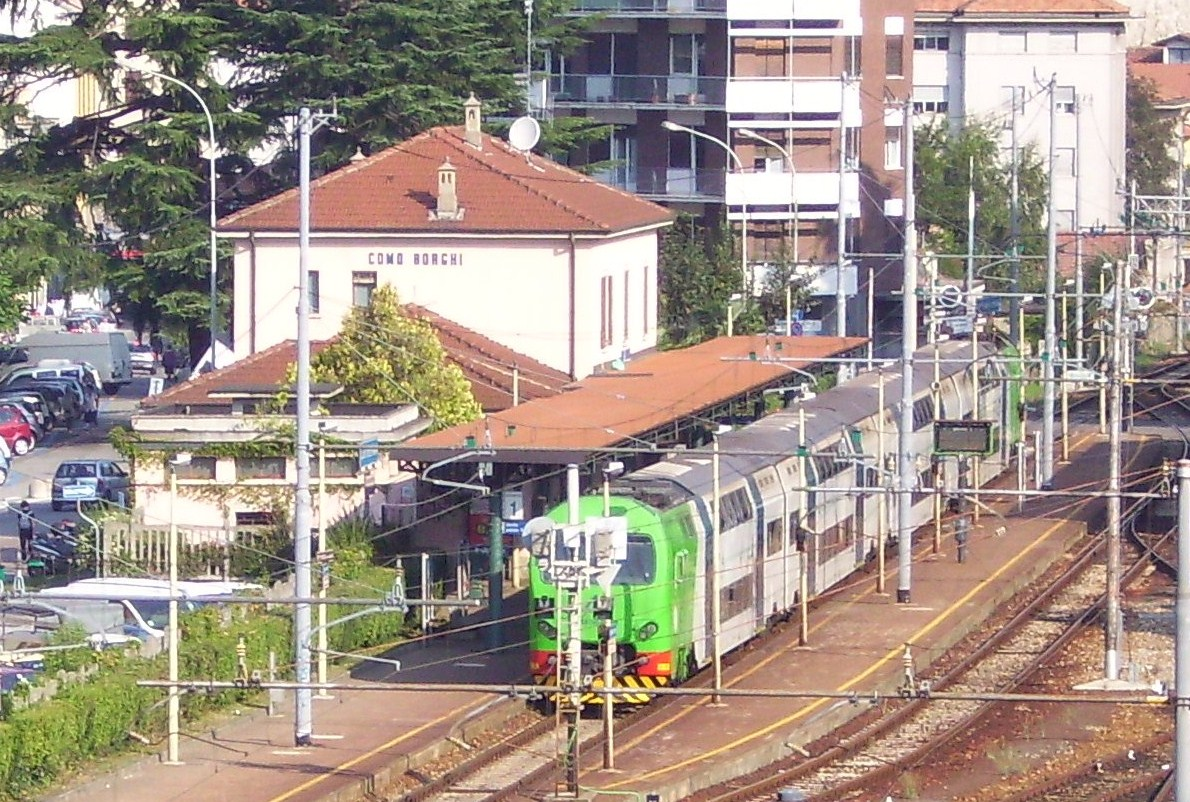
- Panoramic view of the station

General information
- Location: Piazzale Gerbetto, 1, Como, Italy
- Coordinates: 45.8075°N 9.0805°E
- Operator: Ferrovienord
- Line: Saronno–Como railway
- Platforms: 2
- Tracks: 2

Construction
- Structure type: At-grade

History
- Opened: 1885

Services
- Add→{{rail-interchange}}
- Add→{{rail-interchange}}
Location
- Location within Lombardy

Como Nord Borghi railway station (Italian: Stazione di Como Borghi) is a railway station in the city of Como, in the region of Lombardy, northern Italy. It is located on the Saronno–Como railway. The station is operated by Ferrovienord and served by Trenord regional trains.

It is one of several stations in Como, the others being Como San Giovanni and Albate-Trecallo (managed by Rete Ferroviaria Italiana), Como Lago, and the unified Como Camerlata station.

== History ==
The station was inaugurated in 1885 as part of the Como–Varese railway, a line which originally connected Como with Varese and Laveno. (Note: The section of the Como–Varese line between Grandate and Malnate was closed in 1966.) In 1898, the station also became part of the newly constructed Saronno–Como railway.

On 31 July 1966, the section of the Como–Varese railway between Grandate and Malnate was permanently closed, ending direct rail service between Como and Varese on this line. Following the closure, Como Borghi has primarily served the Saronno–Como line.

== Structures and facilities ==
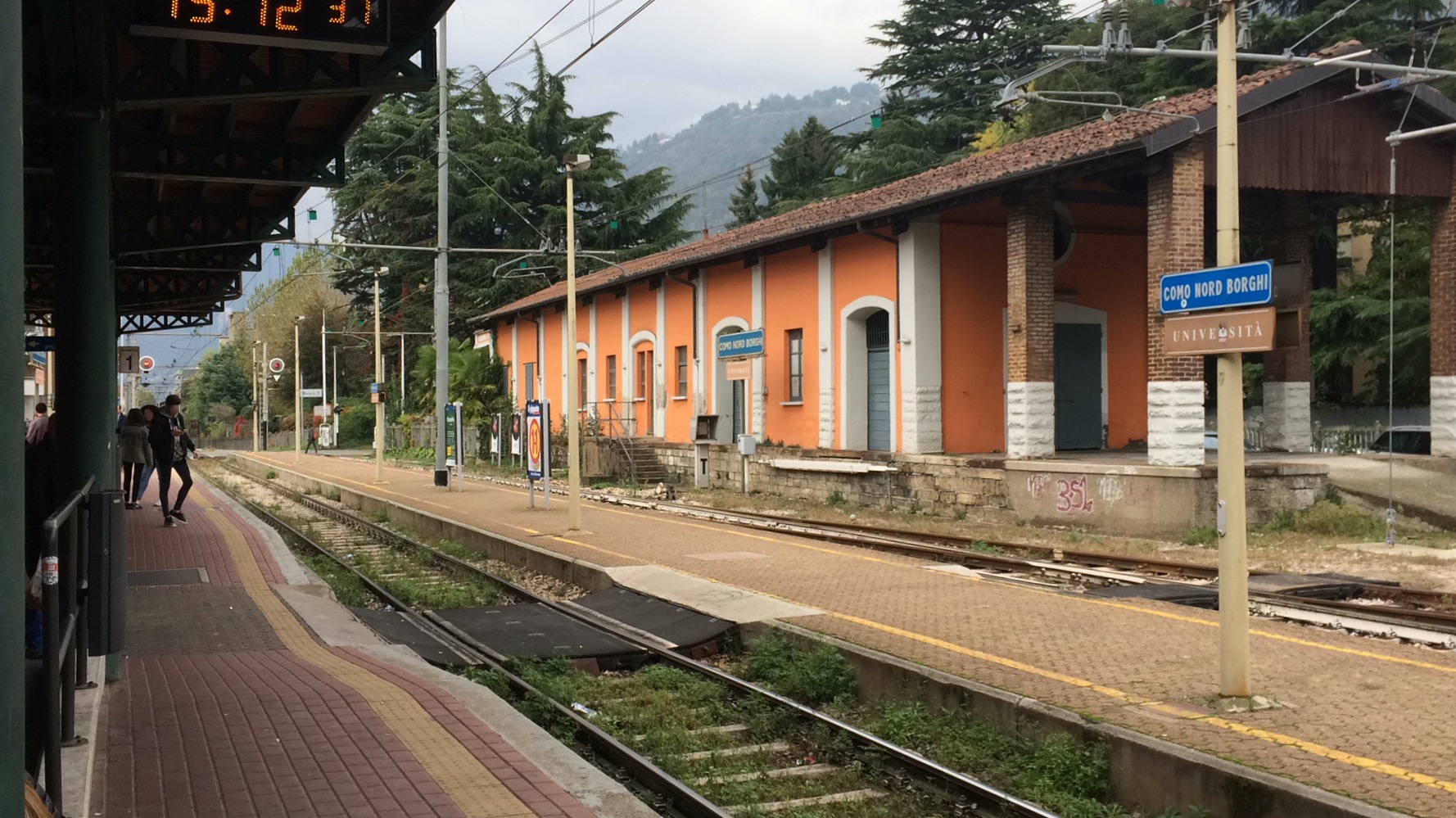
The station's platforms

Managed by Ferrovienord, Como Borghi is classified as a secondary station. The facility includes a passenger building with a waiting room, a bar, and restrooms. The station has two through tracks for passenger service, each with a platform.

The station was historically equipped with a goods yard and several sidings to serve the adjacent textile factories, though this freight activity has ceased. Until 2024, a number of siding tracks were used for the overnight stabling of trains. These were removed in June 2024 to make way for the construction of a new pedestrian underpass.

== Services ==
The station is served by Trenord regional trains, operating on a scheduled timetable as part of the Milan Suburban Railway Service.

- Regionale Operates every 30 minutes, connecting Como Lago to Saronno and Milano Cadorna. These trains stop at all stations between Como Lago and Saronno.
- RegioExpress: Operates during peak hours, providing a faster service to Milano Cadorna with fewer intermediate stops.

== See also ==
- List of railway stations in Lombardy
- Rail transport in Italy
