= Santi Donato e Carpoforo, Novedrate =

Roman Catholic church in Novedrate, Italy

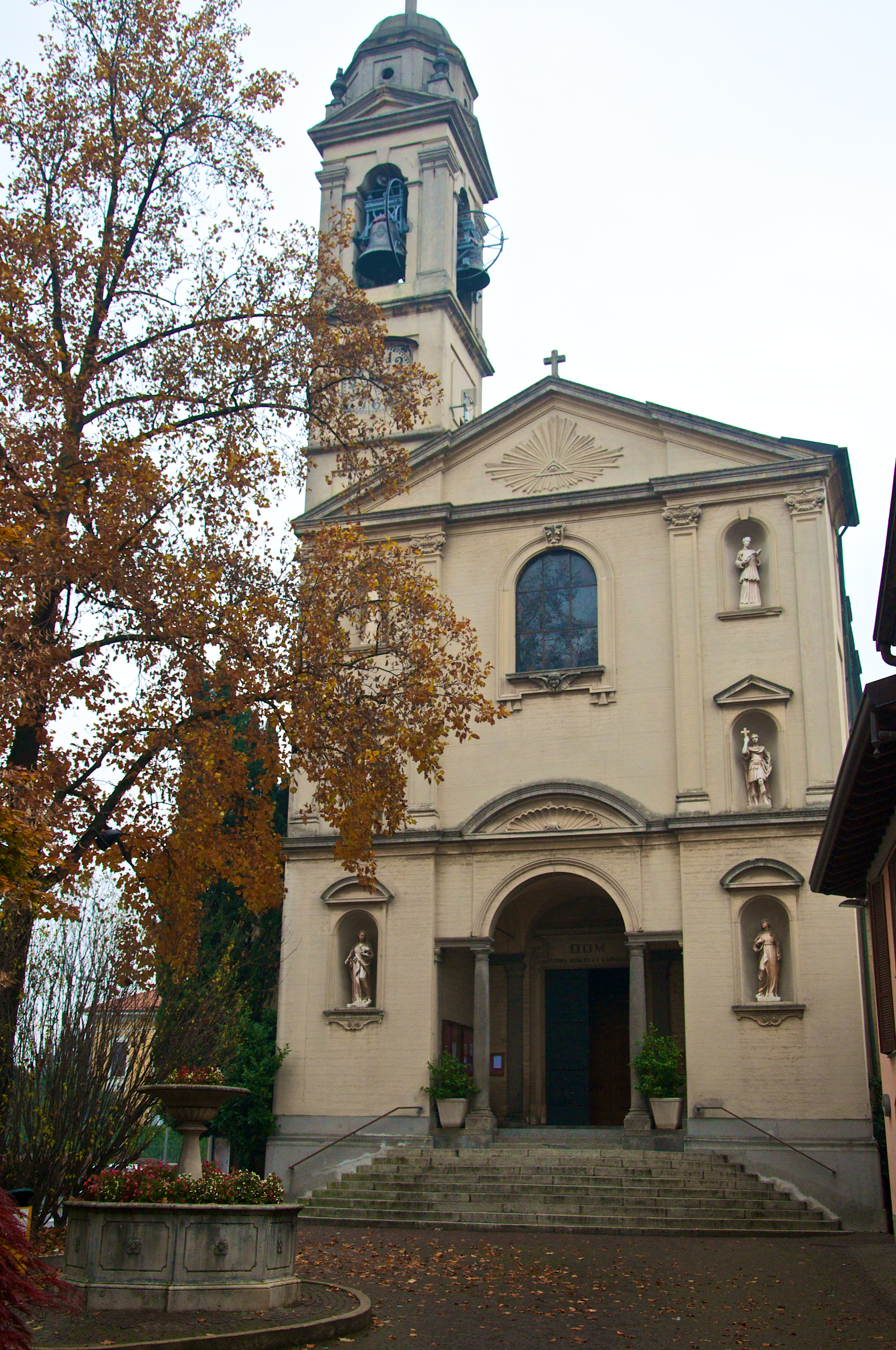
Chiesa di SS. Donato e Carpoforo Novedrate.jpg

Santi Donato e Carpoforo is the Roman Catholic parish church located in Piazza Umberto I in the town of Novedrate, province of Como, region of Lombardy, Italy.

== History ==
A church at the site was present since the 16th century. The present church and belltower was erected in 1902 adding two lateral naves. The ceiling was frescoed in 1906 by Antonio Beghè, while the walls and counterfacade were completed in 1915 by Luigi Morgari. The façade was completed only in 1935.
