= San Vito e Modesto, Cermenate =

Church in Cermenate, Italy

San Vito e Modesto is a Roman Catholic parish church located on Piazza della Pace #3 in Cermenate, province of Como, region of Lombardy, Italy.

== History ==
A church in this parish is first mentioned in 1297; the structure was subsidiary of the Pieve of Fino Mornasco. By the 16th century the present site held a small dilapidated Romanesque building, with rustic stone walls and rubble from other buildings. It was surrounded by a cemetery. The region was decimated by the plague epidemics of the 16th century, and construction in of a new church began in 1612 with a new nave, followed by a choir and transept in 1765. The bell tower was added in the late 18th century. The church underwent refurbishment and reconsecration in 1907, with the addition of a piazza in front,

The interiors contained painted panels depicting scenes in the Life and Martyrdom of Saints Vito and Modesto (1763) by a painter from the Quaglio family.
