= Cucciago railway station =

Railway station in Italy

Cucciago
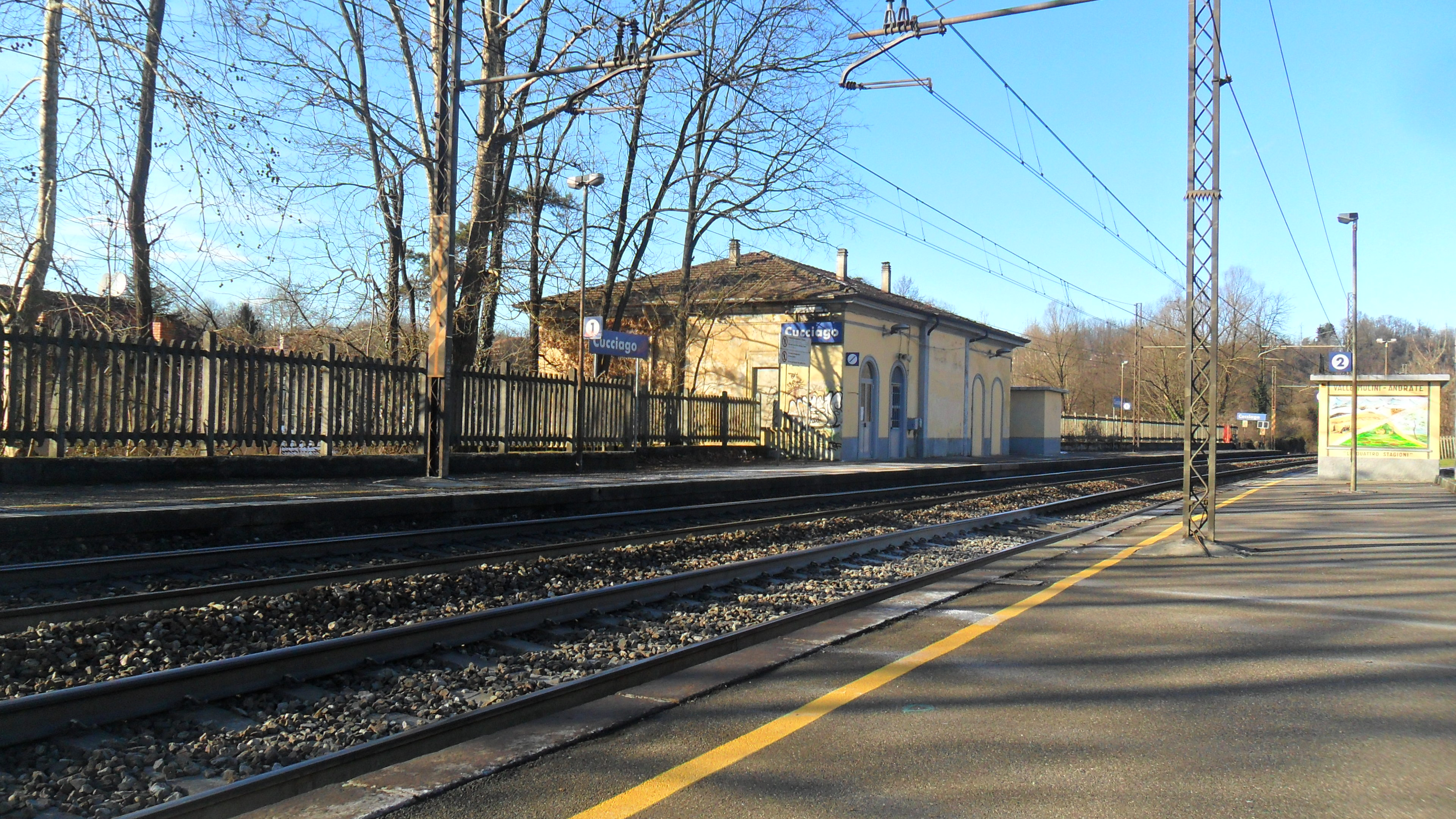

General information
- Location: Via Dogana; Cucciago, Como, Lombardy; Italy
- Coordinates: 45°44′27″N 09°04′55″E
- Operator: Rete Ferroviaria Italiana
- Line: Milan–Chiasso
- Distance: 37.334 km (23.198 mi) from Milano Centrale
- Platforms: 2
- Train operators: Trenord

Other information
- Classification: bronze

History
- Opened: 6 December 1849; 176 years ago
- Electrified: 1939

Services
Preceding station	Trenord	Following station
Como Camerlata towards Chiasso	Line S11 (Milan suburban railway service)	Cantù–Cermenate towards Rho
Location
- Location within Lombardy Location within Northern Italy Location within Italy

Cucciago railway station is a railway station in Italy. Located on the Milan–Chiasso railway, it serves the town of Cucciago.

== Services ==
Cucciago is served by the line S11 of Milan suburban railway service, operated by the lombard railway company Trenord.

== See also ==
- Milan suburban railway service
