= Figino Serenza =

- Comune
- Comune di Figino Serenza
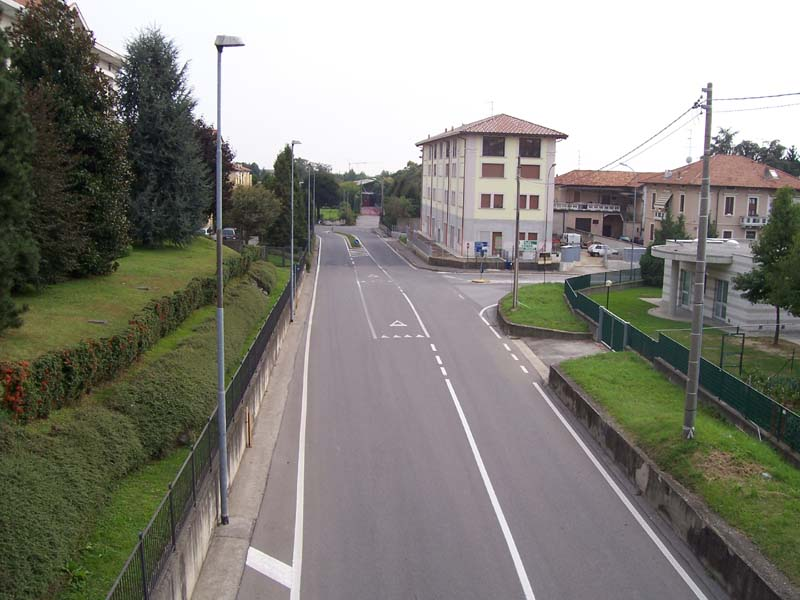

- Location within Italy Location within Lombardy
- Coordinates: 45°43′N 9°8′E
- Country: Italy
- Region: Lombardy
- Province: Como (CO)

Area
  - Total: 4.9 km^{2} (1.9 sq mi)

Population (Dec. 2004)
  - Total: 4,842
  - Density: 990/km^{2} (2,600/sq mi)
- Demonym: Figinesi
- Time zone: UTC+1 (CET)
  - Summer (DST): UTC+2 (CEST)
- Postal code: 22060
- Dialing code: 031
- Website: Official website

Figino Serenza (Brianzöö: Figin [fiˈdʒĩː]) is a comune (municipality) in the Province of Como in the Italian region Lombardy, located about 30 kilometres (19 mi) north of Milan and about 12 kilometres (7 mi) southeast of Como. As of 31 December 2004, it had a population of 4,842 and an area of 4.9 km^{2} (1.9 sq mi).

Figino Serenza borders the following municipalities: Cantù, Carimate, Mariano Comense, Novedrate.

== Demographic evolution ==
Historical population

Year	Pop.	±%
1861	1,290	—
1871	1,374	+6.5%
1881	1,486	+8.2%
1901	1,783	+20.0%
1911	1,826	+2.4%

Year	Pop.	±%
1921	1,927	+5.5%
1931	2,000	+3.8%
1936	2,156	+7.8%
1951	2,416	+12.1%
1961	2,874	+19.0%

Year	Pop.	±%
1971	3,521	+22.5%
1981	4,068	+15.5%
1991	4,522	+11.2%
2001	4,636	+2.5%

Source: Data from ISTAT

== Sports ==
The football team Figino Calcio, which plays in the Seconda Categoria, is based in Figino Serenza. The club is also affiliated with Atalanta BC
