= Carimate =

Carimate Carimaa (Lombard)
- Comune
- Comune di Carimate
- Location within Italy Location within Lombardy
- Coordinates: 45°42′N 9°7′E
- Country: Italy
- Region: Lombardy
- Province: Province of Como (CO)
- Frazioni: Cascina Valle-Stazione di Carimate, Montesolaro

Area
  - Total: 5.2 km^{2} (2.0 sq mi)

Population (Sep 2025)
  - Total: 4,366
  - Density: 840/km^{2} (2,200/sq mi)
- Demonym: Carimatesi
- Time zone: UTC+1 (CET)
  - Summer (DST): UTC+2 (CEST)
- Postal code: 22060
- Dialing code: 031
- Website: Official website

Carimate (Brianzöö: Carimaa [kariˈmaː]) is a comune (municipality) in the Province of Como in the Italian region Lombardy, located about 25 kilometres (16 mi) north of Milan and about 13 kilometres (8 mi) south of Como. As of 9 September 2025, it had a population of 4,366 and an area of 5.2 square kilometres (2.0 mi^{2}).

The municipality of Carimate contains the frazioni (subdivisions, mainly villages and hamlets) Cascina Valle-Stazione di Carimate and Montesolaro.

Carimate borders the following municipalities: Cantù, Cermenate, Figino Serenza, Lentate sul Seveso, Novedrate.

Carimate is served by Carimate railway station. One of the landmarks is the hotel and former castle, Castello di Carimate.

Among the local churches is the parish church of San Giorgio e dell'Immacolata Concezione.

== Demographic evolution ==
Historical population

Year	Pop.	±%
1861	1,341	—
1871	1,354	+1.0%
1881	1,439	+6.3%
1901	1,695	+17.8%
1911	1,887	+11.3%

Year	Pop.	±%
1921	1,854	−1.7%
1931	1,814	−2.2%
1936	1,763	−2.8%
1951	1,900	+7.8%
1961	2,084	+9.7%

Year	Pop.	±%
1971	2,558	+22.7%
1981	3,125	+22.2%
1991	3,469	+11.0%
2001	3,805	+9.7%

Source: Data from ISTAT
