= Cermenate =

Cermenate Cermenaa (Lombard)
- Comune
- Comune di Cermenate
- Location within Italy Location within Lombardy
- Coordinates: 45°42′N 9°5′E
- Country: Italy
- Region: Lombardy
- Province: Como (CO)
- Frazioni: Asnago, Cascina Lavezzari, Freghera, Parmunt, Montesordo

Government
  - Mayor: Luciano Pizzutto

Area
  - Total: 8.18 km^{2} (3.16 sq mi)
- Elevation: 297 m (974 ft)

Population (31 March 2017)
  - Total: 9,204
  - Density: 1,130/km^{2} (2,910/sq mi)
- Demonym: Cermenatesi
- Time zone: UTC+1 (CET)
  - Summer (DST): UTC+2 (CEST)
- Postal code: 22072
- Dialing code: 031
- Website: Official website

Cermenate (Brianzöö: Cermenaa [tʃermeˈnaː]) is a comune (municipality) in the Province of Como in the Italian region Lombardy, located about 25 kilometres (16 mi) north of Milan and about 13 kilometres (8 mi) south of Como.

Cermenate borders the following municipalities: Bregnano, Cantù, Carimate, Lazzate, Lentate sul Seveso, Vertemate con Minoprio.

Cermenate is served by Cantù-Cermenate railway station.

Among the churches are San Vito e Modesto.
