= Saronno–Como railway =

Railway line in Italy

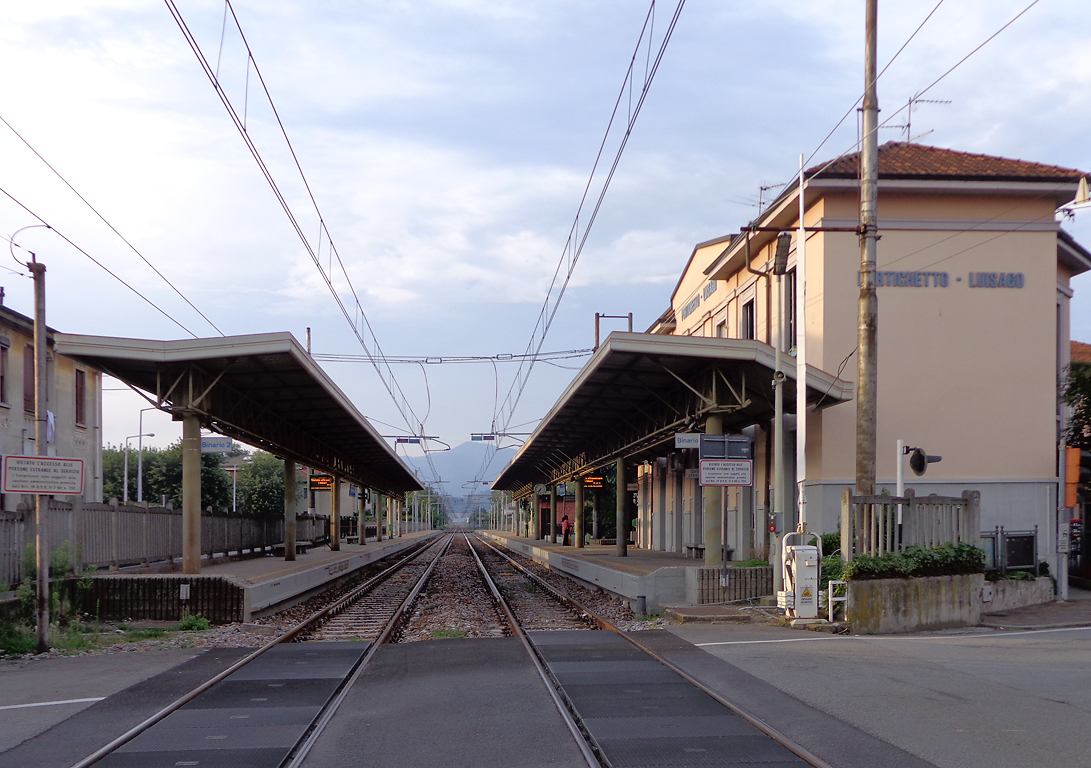
- The line at Portichetto-Luisago station

Overview
- Native name: Ferrovia Saronno-Como
- Owner: Ferrovienord
- Termini: Saronno railway station; Como Lago railway station
- Stations: 12

Service
- Type: heavy rail
- Services: R17, RE7
- Operator(s): Trenord

History
- Opened: 1898

Technical
- Line length: 24.931 km (15.491 mi)
- Number of tracks: 2 (Saronno–Como Camerlata); 1 (Como Camerlata–Como Lago)
- Track gauge: 1,435 mm (4 ft 8 1/2 in)
- Electrification: 3 kV DC, overhead line
- Operating speed: 90 km/h (56 mph)
- Highest elevation: 280 m (920 ft)

Saronno–Como railway is a railway line in Lombardy, Italy.

It is one of the three continuations of the Milan-Saronno railway.

== History ==
The line was opened by the FNM on 1 June 1898 between Saronno and Grandate; the last part, from Grandate to Como Lago, had already been opened on 24 September 1885 as part of the demolished Como–Varese railway.

== See also ==
- List of railway lines in Italy
