= Como San Giovanni railway station =

Railway station in Lombardy, Italy

Como S.G.
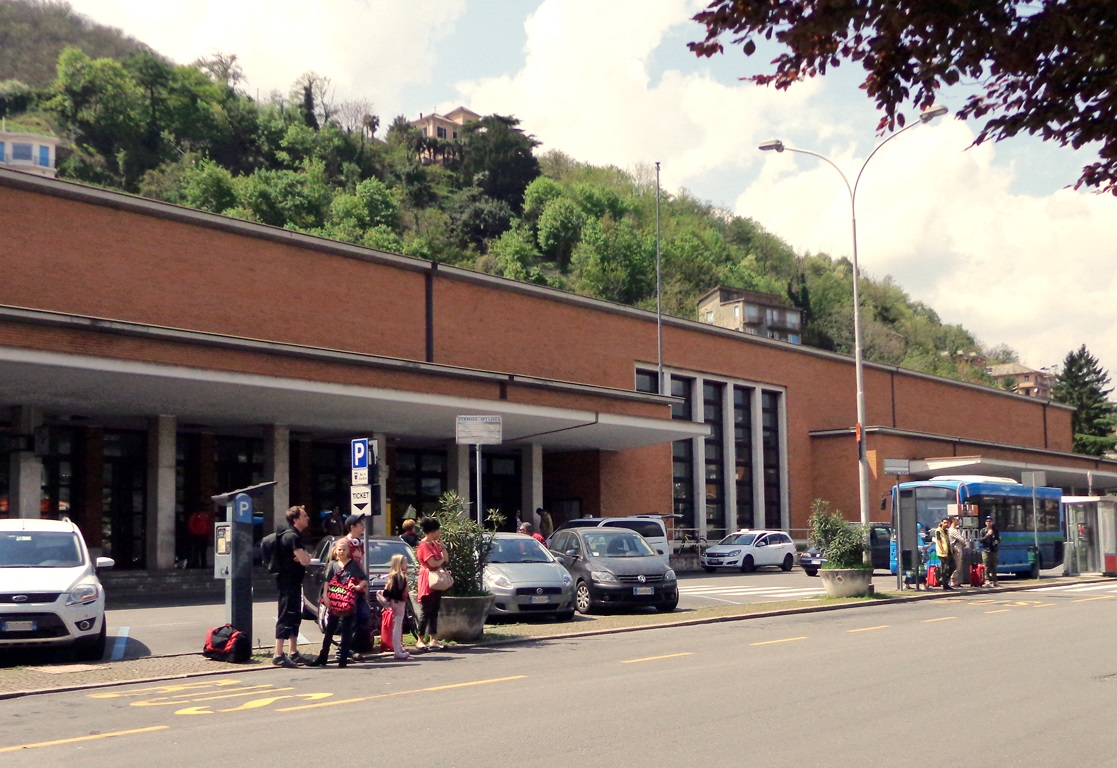
- The station building in 2013

General information
- Location: piazzale San Gottardo; Como; Italy
- Coordinates: 45°48′32″N 9°04′20″E
- Operator: RFI
- Lines: Milan–Chiasso; Como–Lecco
- Tracks: 6

Construction
- Structure type: at-grade

History
- Opened: 27 July 1875
- Rebuilt: 1949
- Electrified: 1939

Services
Preceding station	Trenitalia	Following station
Chiasso towards Frankfurt (Main) Hbf	EuroCity	Monza towards Milano Centrale
Chiasso towards Zürich HB	EuroCity	Monza towards Bologna Centrale, Genova Piazza Principe, Milano Centrale or Venezia Santa Lucia
Preceding station	Trenord	Following station
Chiasso Terminus	Line S11 (Milan suburban railway service)	Como Camerlata towards Rho
Preceding station	TiLo	Following station
Chiasso towards Locarno	RE80	Como Camerlata towards Milano Centrale
Chiasso towards Airolo	S10	Terminus
Chiasso towards Varese	S40	Terminus
Location

Como San Giovanni railway station (Italian: Stazione di Como San Giovanni) is the main station serving the city and comune of Como, in the region of Lombardy, northern Italy. Opened in 1875, it forms part of the Milan–Chiasso railway, and is also a terminus of the Como–Lecco railway, which branches off the main line a few kilometres (miles) to the south, at Albate-Camerlata.

Como San Giovanni is the last Italian station on the line to Chiasso, and therefore fulfils the functions of a border station. However, border checks have not been carried out there since 2008, when Switzerland joined the Schengen Agreement.

The station is currently managed by Rete Ferroviaria Italiana (RFI), but the commercial area of the passenger building is managed by Centostazioni. Train services are operated by Trenitalia. Each of these companies is a subsidiary of Ferrovie dello Stato Italiane (FS), Italy's state-owned rail company.

It is one of four stations in Como, the others being Como Borghi, Como Camerlata and Como Nord Lago.

== Location ==
Como San Giovanni railway station is situated in Piazzale San Gottardo, a 15-minute walk from the city centre.

== History ==
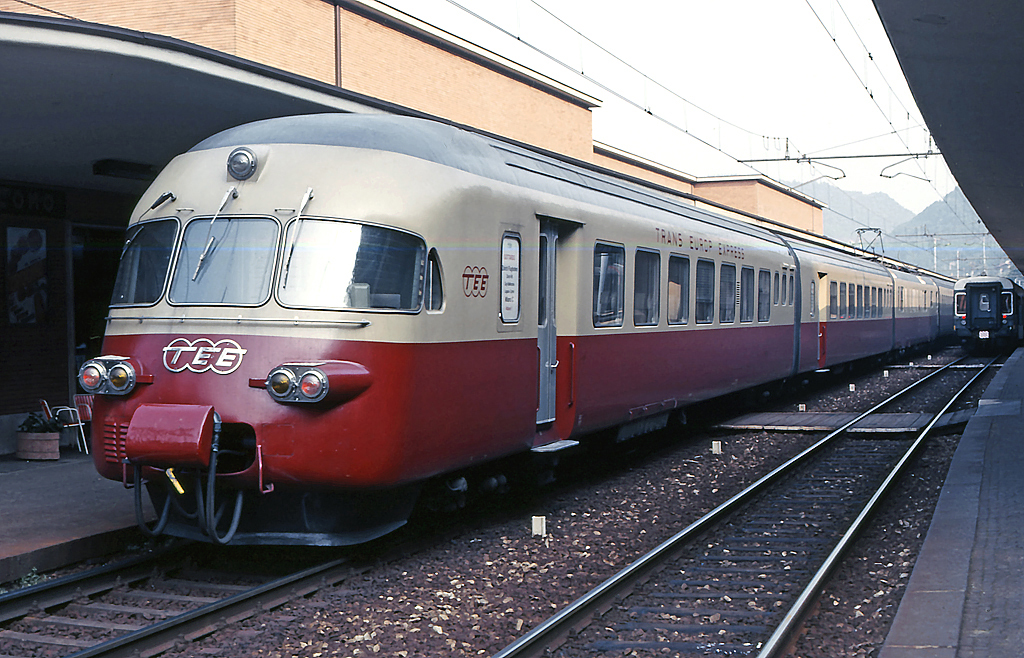
The Trans Europe Express train Gottardo between Zürich HB and Milano Centrale calling at Como San Giovanni station in 1987.

The station was opened on 27 July 1875, upon the inauguration of the Albate–Como section of the Milan–Chiasso railway. It remained the northern terminus of the line until the following year, when the construction of the section from Como under the Monte Olimpinoto to Chiasso in Switzerland was completed. With the opening of the Gotthard Tunnel in 1882, Como San Giovanni became part of an important north-south axis between Northern Italy and Switzerland, as the Milan–Chiasso railway line was one of the southern feeder lines of the Gotthard railway.

In 1888, the railway line from Lecco to Albate was opened, with trains on the line being continued from Albate to Como San Giovanni from the beginning.

== Architecture ==
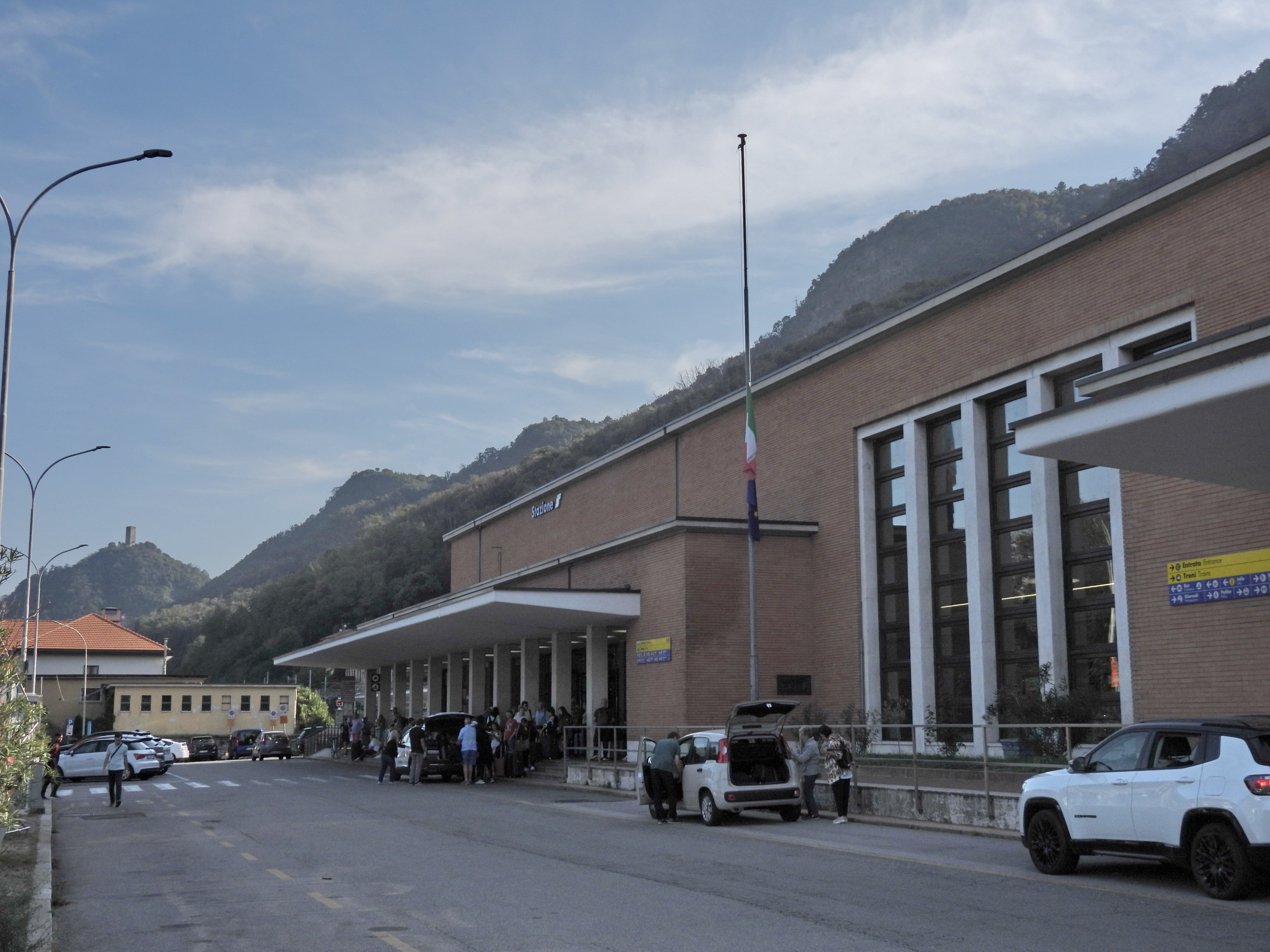
The station building in 2023.

The current passenger building was built after the destruction of World War II, to a design by the Italian engineer and architect Paolo Perilli, known for the numerous railway stations he designed across Italy for the Ferrovie dello Stato. It was inaugurated in 1949. A structure in brick on two levels (of which only the ground floor is accessible to travellers), it consists of three sections joined by a glass wall that provides much of the lighting inside the central hall. It is also attached to shelters facing the station yard.

In 2008, work was completed on a facelift of the station co-financed by Centostazioni and RFI. The project cost 1 million euros, and was subject to cultural heritage constraints. The renovations included the following: restoration and maintenance of buildings, the addition of new businesses dedicated to travelers, the adaptation of plants to legal requirements, removal of architectural barriers, installation of tactile paving for the vision impaired, renovation of public conveniences and the construction of new lifts.

== Layout ==
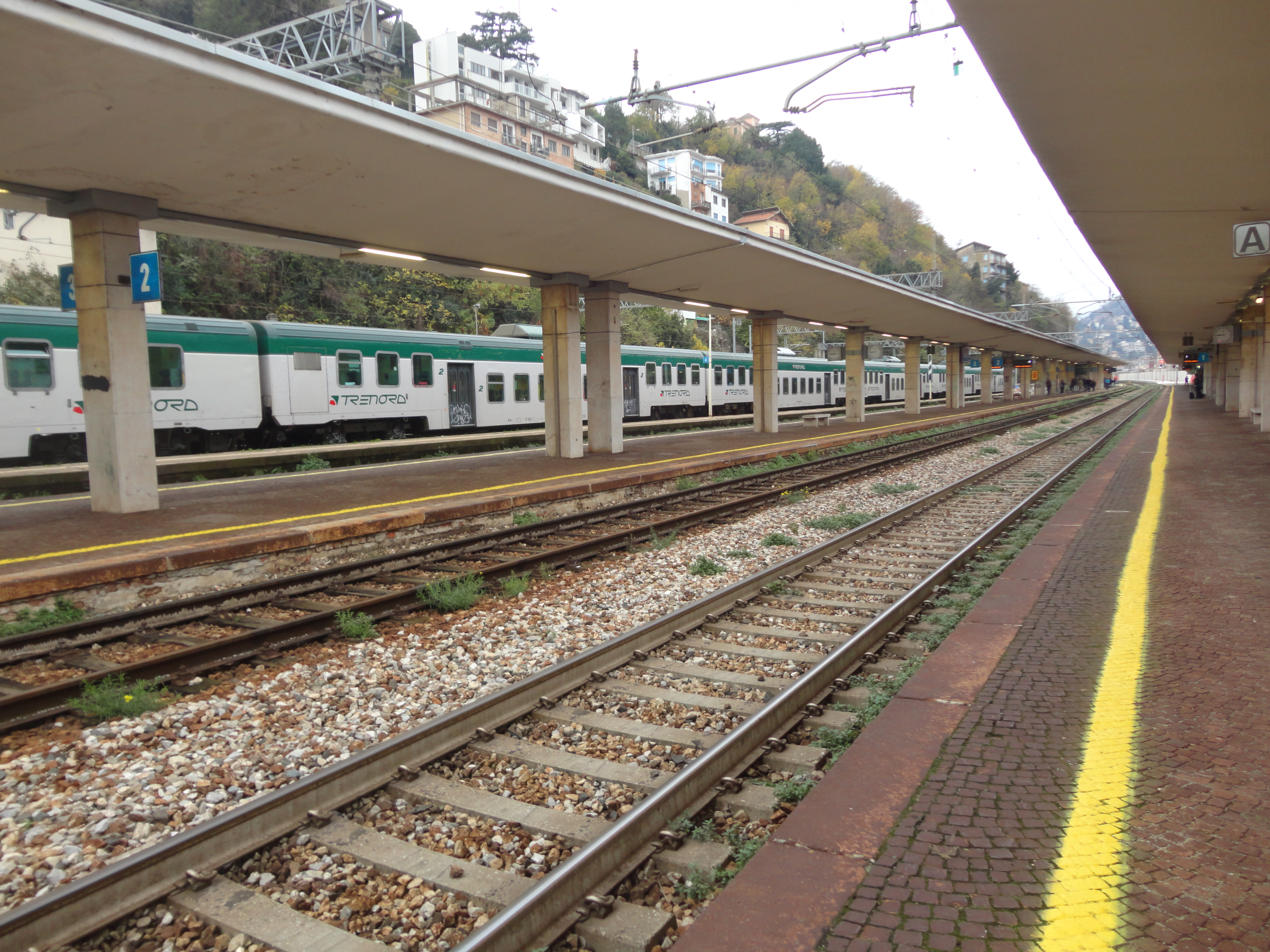
View of the tracks and platforms.

Inside the station yard, there are five through tracks, including four for use by passengers. There are also three dock platforms on the south side of the station (used as the terminus of the line to Lecco) and two on the north side.

Each of the four through tracks dedicated to passenger transport has a platform covered by a concrete shelter. The platforms are connected with each other by a covered walkway and elevators. Track 1 is faced by the main platform, and tracks 2 and 3 by an island platform. Track 4 is seldom used, but is accessible to passengers via a small platform between tracks 3 and 4. To get to that platform, it is necessary to cross track 3.

There is also another track to the north serving the Como railway post office, and, to the south, two tracks connecting the station with its goods yard and the headquarters of the Customs Agency.

== Passenger and train movements ==
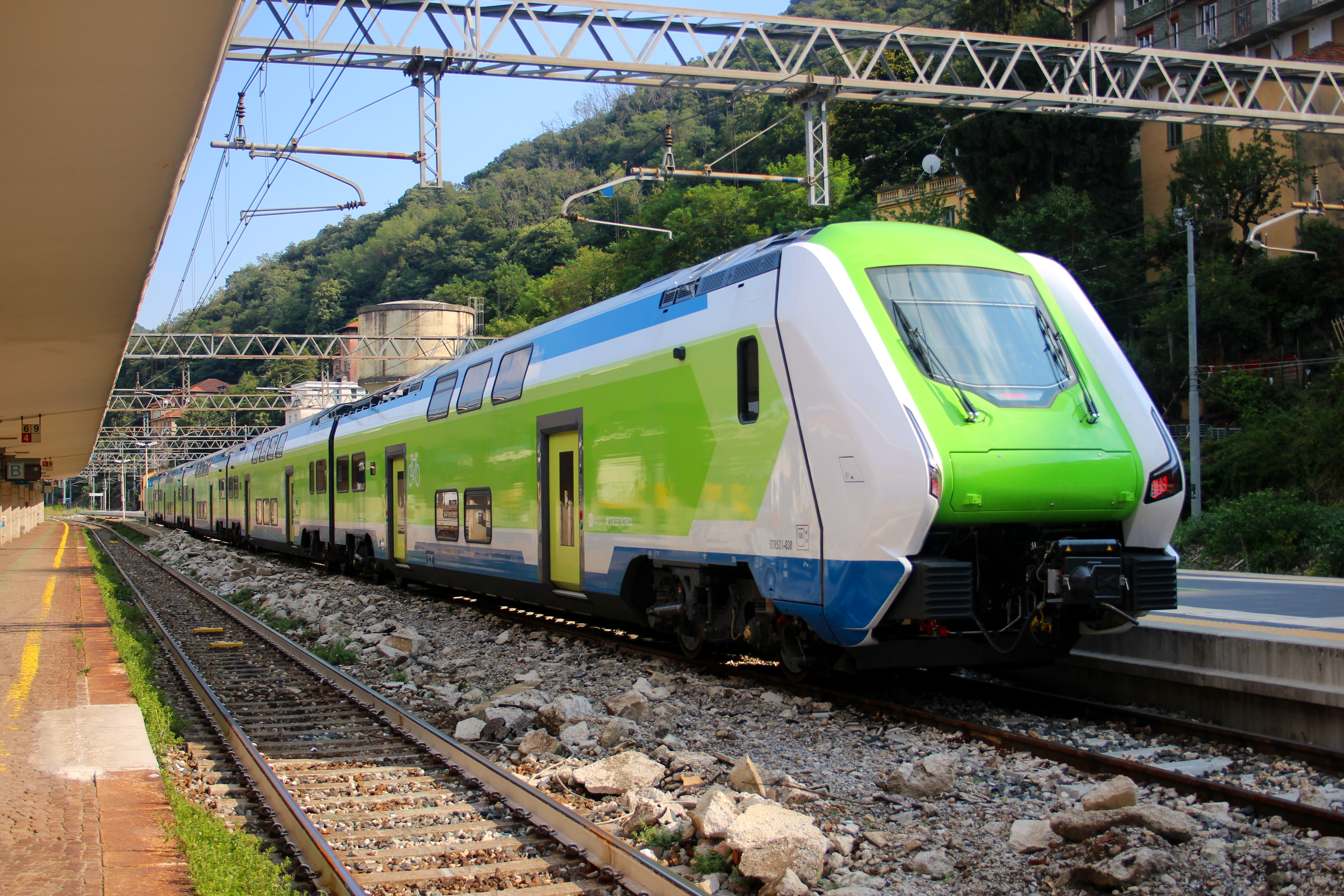
An S11 train of the Milan suburban railway network calling at Como San Giovanni in 2020.

The station has about 1.5 million passenger movements each year.

Como San Giovanni is the border station in Italy before trains enter Switzerland at Chiasso. Following the timetable change in December 2014, only one EuroCity Milan-Zürich train would call at Como instead of all services. The main destinations are Milano Centrale, Milano Porta Garibaldi, Molteno, Lecco, Albate-Camerlata, Bellinzona and Zürich Hauptbahnhof.

The station is also a stop on line S11 of the Milan suburban railway network (Milano Porta Garibaldi–Chiasso; hourly).

== Train services ==
As of the December 2021 timetable change, the following services stop at Como San Giovanni:

- EuroCity:
  - ten trains per day between Zürich Hauptbahnhof and Bologna Centrale, Genova Piazza Principe, Milano Centrale, or Venezia Santa Lucia;.
  - two trains per day between Basel SBB and Milano Centrale or Milano Porta Garibaldi.
- RE80: hourly service between Locarno and Milano Centrale.
- R18: hourly weekday only service to Molteno and rush-hour service to Lecco.
- S10: hourly service to Biasca.
- S11: semi-hourly service between to Milano Porta Garibaldi.
- S40: hourly service to Varese.

== Interchange ==
In front of the passenger building is a small parking lot and a sign indicating the telephone numbers of taxis.

In the square, also in front of the passenger building, is a bus terminal. The operator of the bus service is SPT (Società Pubblica Trasporti, a name of ASF Autolinee), which runs services between 7.20 and 22.15. The main destinations of buses are: Cernobbio, Moltrasio, Argegno, Menaggio, Dongo, San Fedele, Lanzo d'Intelvi, Torno, Asso, Bellagio, Palanzano, Cantù and Appiano Gentile.

== Customs ==
Como San Giovanni is, for customs purposes, a border station for passengers arriving from Switzerland. Customs checks may be performed in the station. Systematic passport controls were abolished when Switzerland joined the Schengen Area in 2008.

== See also ==
- Como Lago railway station
- List of railway stations in Lombardy
- History of rail transport in Italy
- Rail transport in Italy
- Railway stations in Italy
