= Comeaux =

Comeaux is a surname. Notable people with the surname include:

- Amie Comeaux (1976–1997), American country music singer
- Darren Comeaux (born 1960), American football linebacker
- John Comeaux (born 1943), American basketball player

== See also ==
- Ovey Comeaux High School, Lafayette, Louisiana
