= Emanuele da Como =

Italian painter (1625–1701)

Fra Emanuele da Como (1625–1701), was a Franciscan friar, and studied art under the direction of Agostino Scilla at Messina. He distinguished himself by his pure and simple style, which is the more creditable as he flourished at a time when taste for art was in a most deplorable state. In 1672, he executed several frescoes in the Aula Maxima and the cloister of St. Isidore's Franciscan College, Rome, which is part of the Irish Franciscan Province of the Order of Friars Minor. Fra Emanuele da Como.
