= Joan Webster Price =

American artist

Joan Webster Price (born 1931) is an American artist. Her work is included in the collections of the Whitney Museum of American Art, the Smithsonian American Art Museum and the Museum of Modern Art, New York.
