= Komo, Myanmar =

- Location in Myanmar
- Coordinates: 26°14′N 98°13′E
- Country: Myanmar
- State: Kachin State
- District: Myitkyina District
- Township: Hsawlaw Township
- Time zone: UTC+6.30 (UTC + 6:30)

Komo is a village in Hsawlaw Township in Myitkyina District in the Kachin State of north-eastern Myanmar.
