= Vincent Como =

- Born: 1975 (age 50–51)
- Known for: Minimalism, Conceptual Art
- Movement: Color Field Painting
- Website: vincentcomo.com

Vincent Como (born 1975) is a Brooklyn-based visual artist. His work is rooted in Minimalism, Conceptual Art, and Color Field Painting with a specific focus toward Black. Como has referenced the influence of Ad Reinhardt and Kasimir Malevich, as well as movements such as the Italian Arte Povera movement from the 1960s.

Como graduated from the Cleveland Institute of Art's BFA program in 1998 and lived, worked and exhibited widely throughout Chicago and the Midwest from 1998 until relocating to New York in 2006. His 2007 concurrent solo exhibitions “In Praise of Darkness” at Chicago's Western Exhibitions and “Black: Theories and Ongoing Research” at VONZWECK, also in Chicago, were documented in a joint catalog with an essay by artist and curator John Neff and an interview with Phillip von Zweck proprietor of VONZWECK. He was selected as one of the artists representing the United States in the 2nd Vienna Biennale in 2008.

Como's work employs the use of the black field as a meditation on the constituent associations of the color black (Black Holes, Evil, Darkness) sometimes alongside referential diagrams detailing the focus of the Painting/Drawing/Object.

== Solo and Two Person Exhibitions ==
- 2013: Paradise Lost, MINUS SPACE, Brooklyn, NY
- 2012: Correlation of Space: Vincent Como and Gehry Kohler, City Ice Arts, Kansas City, MO
- 2011: Toward Singularity, Sommerkampf, Piermont, NY
- 2010: Haunting Modernity, House Gallery, Salt Lake City, UT
- 2010: Black Mass, Proof Gallery, Boston, MA
- 2009: Vincent Como and Joseph Sabatino, PS 122, New York, NY
- 2008: The Blackening, Secret Project Robot, Brooklyn, NY
- 2007: In Praise of Darkness, Western Exhibitions, Chicago, Illinois
- 2007: Black: Theories and Ongoing Research, VONZWECK, Chicago, Illinois
- 2006: As Defined By Our Surroundings, Presented by Dogmatic at ArtLA, Santa Monica, CA
- 2004: Object (Subject), Standard, Chicago, Illinois
- 2002: Untitled (Dogmatic Exhibition), Dogmatic, Chicago, Illinois
- 1998: Untitled (Inflated Space), Southside Gallery, Cleveland, OH

== Group exhibitions ==
- 2016: Fabulous You, TSA New York, Brooklyn, NY
- 2016: Death: A Summer Show, Trestle Projects, Brooklyn, NY, curated by Melissa Staiger
- 2016: On Paper, MINUS SPACE, Brooklyn, NY
- 2016: After; Curious Matter, Jersey City NJ, curated by Arthur Bruso
- 2015: The Violent Study Club, Stout Projects, Brooklyn, NY
- 2015: Dreams Were Made For Mortals VI, St. Vitus, Brooklyn, NY curated by Karlynn Holland
- 2015: 10 Part Invention, JAUS Gallery, Los Angeles, CA
- 2015: Matters of the Jugular, SUGAR, Brooklyn, NY
- 2015: Improvised Showboat #12, Curated by Lauren Britton and Zachary Keeting, Gary Stephan Studio, New York, NY
- 2015: Nothing = Everything, c2c/wc Project Space, San Francisco, CA
- 2015: Elements, MINUS SPACE, Brooklyn, NY
- 2014: Triangles, Ventanna 244, Brooklyn, NY curated by Melissa Staiger
- 2014: Painting Black, Sylvia Wald and Po Kim Art Gallery, New York, NY, curated by Ivo Ringe and Joe Barnes, with among others Ivo Ringe, Heiner Thiel etc.
- 2014: About a Mountain, Asya Geisberg Gallery, New York, NY, curated by Holly Jarrett
- 2014: Reductions, City Ice Arts, Kansas City, MO
- 2014: To TSA, With Love, Tiger Strikes Asteroid, Philadelphia, PA
- 2014: Keyed up in Bushwick, 56 Bogart, Brooklyn, NY curated by Key Projects, hosted by Carol Salmanson
- 2014: The Heroic Object, Parallel Art Space, Ridgewood, NY
- 2014: Make/Shift, Folioleaf, Brooklyn, NY
- 2013: Half Life, The Prayzner Residence, Brooklyn, NY
- 2013: Paint it Black, Guest Spot, Baltimore, MD
- 2013: Meta Vista, 16 Wilson (formerly Storefront Bushwick), Brooklyn, NY curated by Matthew Neil Gehring, hosted by Deborah Brown
- 2013: Makers Manual, The Institute Library, New Haven, CT organized by Melanie Carr
- 2013: That Summer Feeling, Sweatshop Studios, Brooklyn, NY curated by George Terry
- 2013: Baracca: Ritual and Practice, BuroRotterdam, Rotterdam, Netherlands, curated by Yvo van der Vat and Ibrahim Ineke
- 2013: Correspondence I, Tiger Strikes Asteroid, Philadelphia, PA
- 2012: Neither Here Nor There But Anywhere and Everywhere, MINUS SPACE, Brooklyn, NY
- 2012: We Have Relocated To Our New Location, Picture Farm, Brooklyn, NY organized by Karl LaRocca and Kayrock Screenprinting
- 2012: MINUS SPACE en Oaxaca, Multiple Cultural Venues, Oaxaca, Mexico, curated by Matthew Deleget and Emi Winter
- 2012: Possibly the Last Postcard Show, Gallery Wolfy Part II, Cleveland, OH
- 2012: Brucennial 2012, 159 Bleeker St, NYC, organized by the Bruce High Quality Foundation
- 2012: (No) Vacancy, Carrie Secrist Gallery, Chicago, Illinois
- 2012: Black Thorns in the White Cube, Paragraph Gallery, Kansas City, MO and Western Exhibitions, Chicago IL, curated by Amelia Ishmael
- 2012: Dreams Were Made For Mortals III, St Vitus, Brooklyn, NY curated by Karlynn Holland
- 2012: Lineup, SUGAR, Brooklyn, NY (Rounds 3 and 4 of a season-long rotating exhibition)
- 2011: Ritual Aesthetics, Tompkins Projects, Brooklyn, NY, curated by Progress Report
- 2011: Lineup, SUGAR, Brooklyn, NY (Rounds 1 and 2 of a season-long rotating exhibition)
- 2011: We Still See The Black, New Art Center, Newtonville, MA, curated by Alexander DeMaria and Owen Rundquist
- 2011: Brandt 21, Brandt Gallery, Cleveland, OH
- 2011: Chain Letter, Samson Projects, Boston, MA
- 2011: Salt Lake City Biennial, House Gallery, Salt Lake City, UT
- 2011: Chinese Take Out, Art in General, New York, NY, organized by Jason Bailer Losh
- 2011: Heads on Poles, Western Exhibitions, Chicago IL, curated by Paul Nudd and Scott Wolniak
- 2010: Ace of Spades: Alexander Binder, Vincent Como, and Hilda Shen, SUGAR, Brooklyn, NY
- 2010: Ah Wilderness!, Ebersmoore, Chicago, Illinois
- 2010: Psychopomp, Curious Matter, Jersey City, NJ
- 2010: Black Lab, The Lab, San Francisco, CA
- 2010: Drawing on Drawing, Deep Space New York, curated by Rory Donaldson and Erica Mercado
- 2010: Art/Value/Currency, the Pigeon Wing, London, England and Eastern District, Brooklyn, NY curated by Isobel Shirley
- 2010: The Artists Guide to the L.A. Galaxy, West Los Angeles College Art Gallery, Culver City, CA curated by Michael Arata and qi peng
- 2009: Artist Books and Prints, Central Booking, Brooklyn, NY
- 2009: A Book About Death, Emily Harvey Foundation Gallery, New York, NY
- 2009: Human Craters, BRIC Rotunda Gallery, Brooklyn, NY curated by Andrea Horisaki-Christens
- 2009: Infinite Possibilities, MomentaArt, Brooklyn, NY
- 2009: Alchemy, Hudson Guild Galleries. New York, NY
- 2008: Black, G Fine Art, Washington DC
- 2008: VIENNABiennale2, Vienna, Austria
- 2008: VONZWECK at the Barn, Chicago, Illinois
- 2008: Hocus Pocus, Curious Matter, Jersey City, NJ
- 2008: New American Paintings, Exhibition in Print, Issue #74 Northeastern edition
- 2007: New York, NY 2007, McCormack Gallery, New York, NY
- 2007: If Then, As If, One Night Stand, Brooklyn, NY
- 2006: Contemporary Works on Paper, Barrow and Juarez Gallery, Milwaukee, WI
- 2006: Under Cover, Urban Institute for Contemporary Arts, Grand Rapids, MI
- 2006: Evanston+Vicinity Biennial, Evanston Art Center, Evanston, IL
- 2006: Group Exhibition, Drawing and Book Art gallery of Western Exhibitions, Chicago, Illinois
- 2006: Fresh A.I.R., Noyes Cultural Arts Center, Evanston, IL
- 2006: Perfect, a Group Exhibition, through the Illinois State Museum: Southern Illinois Art Gallery, Whittington, IL; Illinois State Museum, Lockport, IL
- 2005: Drawn Out, Gallery 400, University of Illinois at Chicago, Chicago, Illinois
- 2005: Perfect, the Petite Selection, Fermilab National Accelerator Laboratory Art Gallery, Batavia, IL
- 2005: Perfect, a Group Exhibition, traveling exhibition shown at: Urban Institute for Contemporary Arts, Grand Rapids, MI; Art Museum of the University of Memphis, Memphis, TN
- 2005: Artists in Residence, Anchor Graphics, Chicago, Illinois
- 2004: Varied Marks: Contemporary Drawings and Works on Paper, Moser Performing Arts Center Gallery, University of St. Francis, Joliet, IL
- 2004: Perfect, a Group Exhibition, Chicago Cultural Center, Chicago, Illinois
- 2004: Art Miami, with Schopf Gallery on Lake, Miami, FL
- 2003: Pyramid Scheme (a curatorial project and exhibition), Schopf Gallery on Lake, Chicago, Illinois
- 2003: Art Boat, with Dogmatic, Chicago, Illinois
- 2003: Stray Show, with Dogmatic, Chicago, Illinois
- 2002: Selections I, SPACES Gallery, Cleveland, OH
- 2001: Traumaspace3, Traumaspace, Chicago, Illinois
- 2000: Multiples4, NFA Space, Chicago, Illinois
- 2000: 48 Hours of Making Art, B.K. Smith Gallery, Lake Erie College, Painsville, OH
- 1999: Hot Beats and Renditions, Butcher Shop, Chicago, Illinois
- 1999: Squirrels on Parade, Suitable, Chicago, Illinois
- 1998: The Artist Book II, FACET, Taos, NM
