= Como Nord Lago railway station =

Railway station in Como, Italy

Como Nord Lago
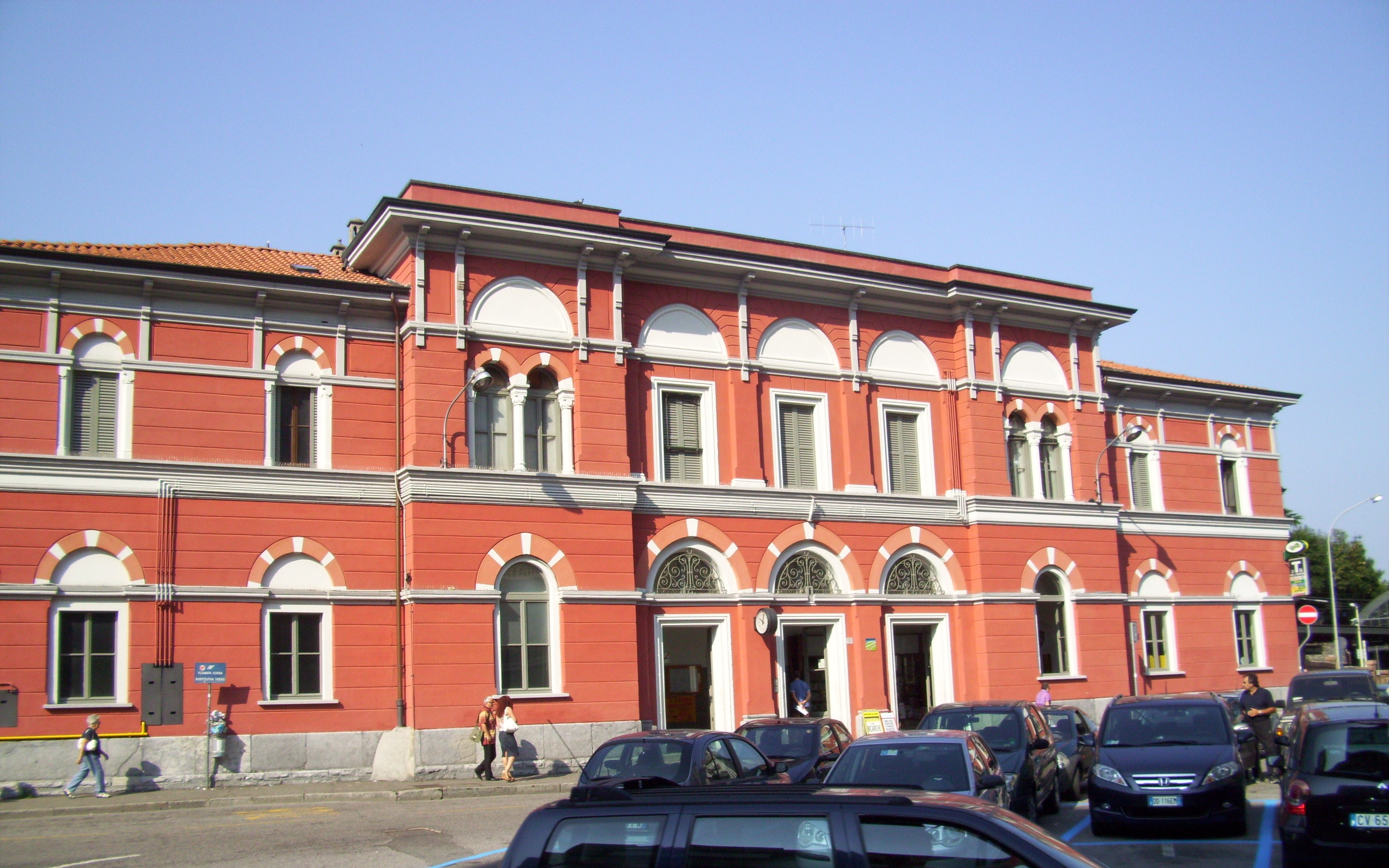
- Exterior view of Como Nord Lago station

General information
- Location: Largo Leopardi, 3, Como, Italy
- Coordinates: 45.814169°N 9.084197°E
- Operator: Ferrovie Nord Milano (infrastructure)
- Line: Saronno–Como railway
- Tracks: 4

Construction
- Structure type: At-grade

History
- Opened: 1885
Location
- Location within Lombardy Location within Northern Italy Location within Italy

Como Nord Lago railway station (also known as Como Lago) is a railway station in Como, Lombardy, northern Italy. It is near the shore of Lake Como, a short walk from the town center. The station serves as the northern terminus of the Saronno–Como railway, a branch of the Milan–Saronno railway. Passenger train services are operated exclusively by Trenord and connect Como Nord Lago with Milano Cadorna railway station.

It is one of four stations in Como, the others being Como Borghi, Como Camerlata and Como San Giovanni.

== History ==
The station was opened in 1885 as the terminus of the newly constructed Saronno-Como railway. The line was intended to provide a direct link between Como and Milan, bypassing the existing line through Monza. The original station building, still in use today, features a neoclassical design, typical of late 19th-century Italian railway architecture.

== Station layout ==
The station building is situated on the western side of the tracks. It houses a ticket office, waiting room, and other passenger facilities. The platforms are accessible via a pedestrian underpass. The station is adjacent to a bus terminal, providing connections to local and regional bus services. There is also a ferry terminal nearby, providing boat services across Lake Como.

== See also ==
- History of rail transport in Italy
- Rail transport in Italy
- Railway stations in Italy
- List of railway stations in Lombardy
