= COMOS =

Plant engineering software

COMOS is a plant engineering software from Siemens. The applications for this software are in the process industries for the engineering, operation, and maintenance of process plants as well as their asset management.

== History ==
The COMOS (acronym for Component Object Server) software system was originally developed and sold by the Logotec Software GmbH, then by the innotec GmbH (founded in 1991 with headquarters in Schwelm, Germany). The first version hit the market in 1996. In 2008, the innotec GmbH was taken over by the Siemens Corporation COMOS is developed further and marketed by a subsidiary, the Siemens Industry Software GmbH. The current status is COMOS Generation 10.

== Product characteristics ==
Originally, COMOS was developed as an integrated CAE system for engineering in plant construction: all process engineering trades and the involved disciplines of the Electrical, Instrumentation & Control system engineering should be able to work together seamlessly on one system platform.

The system incorporates the characteristics of object orientation, central data administration, and open system architecture. Interfaces enable the integration into existing IT infrastructures or cooperation with supplementary software systems. The COMOS software system is based on a central data platform and includes applications that can be combined. They help with the engineering and set-up, operation, and shut-down of industrial plants.

== Applications ==
The software is used by plant developers (e.g. EPC) to plan process plants (chemical, energy, water / waste water, pharmaceuticals, oil, natural gas, food, etc.). It is also used by plant owner/operators in the mentioned industries, since COMOS not only supports engineering but also operational processes. There are regular user conferences. Its architecture makes COMOS suitable for engineering: it can manage large quantities of data and provide it on an integrated basis. Siemens cooperates in the standardization of export and import interfaces (DEXPI - Data Exchange in the Process Industry), an initiative together with BASF, Bayer, and Evonik.

== Scope of functions ==
The software system is modular. The functionalities of the COMOS platform support the digital transformation of a plant via the object-oriented database and a special layer technology that permits joint and consistent work on data and documents. Object properties or attributes can be changed in data sheets and various entry masks. Batch queries and changes are also possible.

The system is used to design process engineering. Integration into standard process simulators results in the definition of process data at an early planning stage using process flow diagrams and combination with the engineering of processing plants. Another module is used to make this data more precise. The pipework engineering based on piping and instrumentation diagrams followed specified industry standards for the respective pipe classes. Data is exchanged in the further geometrical planning using isometries based on ISO 15926. At the end one gets the virtual 3D design of the plant.

The system serves for the electrical engineering of plants all the way to their complete automation: it covers electrical, measurement, control, and regulation (EMSR) processes. Functional plans and sequences can be generated based on common standards. Sequence controls can also be represented graphically. This information can be exchanged directly with distributed control system (DCS) process control systems such as Simatic PCS 7.

It supports plant operation after start-up. Engineering data can be used and expanded in the operating phase. Repairs or maintenance work can be reported directly from the field to the central system using mobile maintenance processes. It permits traceable document and data management. It meets the strict requirements of the FDA. Secure access possibilities permit work with distributed information all over the world. It also makes it possible to train plant personnel with visualization and simulation in 3D VR models combined with corresponding training scenarios. Walkinside was developed by the 3D specialist VRcontext and was integrated into the software after the takeover of the company by Siemens in 2011.
