= Minus Space =

Minus Space is an art gallery located in Dumbo, Brooklyn, NY. It specializes in abstract art and reductive art.

== History ==
Minus Space began as an online curatorial and critical project presenting reductive and concept based art. Reductive art includes geometric abstraction, artwork that deals with repetition, monochrome or limited color, seriality. and minimalism. It is also characterized by the use of plain-spoken materials, precise craftsmanship and intellectual rigor.

It was launched as an online curatorial project in August 2003 by Brooklyn artists Matthew Deleget and Rossana Martinez, and gradually developed into a showcase for dozens of artists. They began by putting portfolios and curating exhibitions online. Minus Space published interviews of artists, reviews and critical essays. At this point project was only online, literally minus space.

Minus Space then started to produce physical exhibitions in their Brooklyn project space. These included one person shows of abstract painting, installations and performance art. In addition they began to curate exhibitions nationally and internationally at universities, galleries, artist-run spaces and nonprofit spaces located in Manhattan; St. Mary's City, Maryland; Sydney, Australia; Houston, Texas; Brussels, Belgium.

Minus Space opened their initial gallery space at 98 Fourth Street in Gowanus in April 2006. In September 2011, they relocated to a gallery-filled building at 111 Front Street in Dumbo.

Hyperallergic selected the Minus Space exhibition Roberta Allen: Works from the 1970s as "Best of 2014: Top 10 Brooklyn Art Shows."

== Exhibitions and curatorial projects ==
In 2008, MoMA PS1 exhibited Minus Space – The Art of Reduction, a survey of 54 artists from 14 countries affiliated with Minus Space. The exhibition was curated by Phong Bui, publisher of the Brooklyn Rail and P.S. 1 curatorial advisor. The exhibition marked the 5th anniversary of Minus Space.

In 2008 Minus Space also curated an exhibit to re-present abstract shaped canvas paintings as new, made by Mark Dagley first shown with Tony Shafrazi Gallery 20 years earlier in 1987. Most of the exhibition of was painted in William S. Burroughs Bunker in the Bowery in New York City.

They curated a traveling exhibition Machine Learning which was shown at the Boyden Gallery of St. Mary's College of Maryland, The Painting Center in New York City, Gallery Sonja Roesch in Houston, TX in 2007 and 2008. The title of the exhibition was inspired by a subfield of artificial intelligence concerned with the design and development of algorithms that allow computers to learn. Machine learning algorithms recognize patterns within massive sets of data. Real world applications include the internet search engine. This exhibition examined new pattern painting in the information age.

Minus Space organized the group exhibition, Escape from New York, which originated at Sydney Non Objective, Sydney, Australia, in 2007, later traveled to Curtin University in Perth in 2008, Project Space Spare Room, RMIT University in Melbourne in 2009, and then to The Engine Room, Massey University, Wellington, New Zealand in 2010.

In 2009, Minus Space exhibited album covers designed by Josef Albers along with ephemera and documentation from the Josef and Anni Albers Foundation demonstrating the record jackets as firsthand projects in abstract applied art.

In 2011, Minus Space exhibited a collection of vintage issues of Life (magazine) representing the magazine's historical coverage of modern art, including the 1949 article, “Jackson Pollock: Is he the greatest living painter in the United States?,” alongside works by the artist Loren Munk addressing both the history of New York School (art) and the field of art criticism.

In 2013, Minus Space organized, in collaboration with artist John Zinsser, a large survey exhibition examining the history and legacy of gallerist Julian Pretto (1945-1995) and his downtown New York galleries, active during the mid-1970s through the mid-1990s. The exhibition featured the work of more than 40 national and international artists in an array of different media, including painting, drawing, sculpture, installation, video, and poetry.

== Artists ==
Represented artists and estates:

- Roberta Allen
- Hartmut Böhm
- Sharon Brant
- Michael Brennan
- Bibi Calderaro
- Vincent Como
- Mark Dagley
- Julian Dashper
- Gabriele Evertz
- Linda Francis
- Cris Gianakos
- Daniel Göttin
- Julio Grinblatt
- Lynne Harlow
- Gilbert Hsiao
- Ward Jackson
- Kyle Jenkins
- Russell Maltz
- John Nixon
- Carrie Pollack
- Leslie Roberts
- Michael Rouillard
- Erik Saxon
- Robert Swain
- Tilman
- Li Trincere
- Jan van der Ploeg
- Sanford Wurmfeld

Minus Space has also exhibited work by Josef Albers, Rene Pierre Allain, Taka Amano, Carl Andre, Stephen Antonakos, Robert Barry (artist), Tom Brazelton, Farrell Brickhouse, Rosemarie Castoro, Peter Downsbrough, Kathy Drasher, Anoka Faruqee, Gail Fitzgerald, Suzan Frecon, Michelle Grabner, Christian Haub, Nancy Haynes, Marcia Hafif, Betsy Kaufman, Melissa Kretschmer, Gary Lang, Ellen Lanyon, Christopher Lea, Julian Lethbridge, Daniel Levine, Sol LeWitt, Tom Martinelli, Douglas Melini, Gregory Montreuil, Olivier Mosset, Victoria Munro, Mary Obering, Antonella Piemontese, Donald Powley, Lucio Pozzi, Daniel Reynolds, Stephen Rosenthal, Michael Scott, DM Simons, Phil Sims, Cary Smith, Ted Stamm, Steven Steinman, Ted Victoria, Merrill Wagner, Oliver Wasow, Stephen Westfall. Robert Yasuda, and John Zinsser

== Presence online ==
Minus Space has a space on the internet enabling it to collaborate with other institutions. The web site has an online log that functions as a web portal for information on exhibitions of reductive art internationally. There is also a comprehensive directory of related web sites for reductive art including galleries, museums and related publications, a directory of artists affiliated with Minus Space, and also artist interviews.

Minus Space maintains a comprehensive chronology of reductive and concept-based art. The chronology includes major events, exhibitions, and writings in the development of reductive and concept-based art in Europe, South and North America from 1800 to date.
