= Milan–Chiasso railway =

Railway line in Italy and Switzerland

Milan-Chiasso railway

Overview
- Status: Operational
- Owner: RFI
- Locale: Italy - Switzerland
- Termini: Milan; Chiasso

Service
- Operator(s): Trenitalia; Swiss Federal Railways

History
- Opened: 1840

Technical
- Line length: 51 km (32 mi)
- Track gauge: 1,435 mm (4 ft 8 1/2 in) standard gauge
- Electrification: Electrified at 3000 V DC

The Milano–Chiasso railway line is an Italian state-owned railway connecting Milan to Como and Chiasso, Switzerland.

It is electrified at 3000 volts DC. Between Milan and Monza it has four tracks and is used not only by trains operating to and from Como, but also by freight and passenger trains connecting Milan with Bergamo and Lecco, either directly or routed via Molteno. North of Monza, it has two tracks, but between the junction "Bivio Rosales" and Chiasso there is a parallel double track line (used mainly by freight trains to bypass the steep incline to Como) including Monte Olimpino 2 tunnel (7207 m).

== History ==
The first section of the line is the Milan–Monza line, which was opened by the Kingdom of Lombardy-Venetia (part of the Austrian Empire) as the Imperiale Regia Privilegiata Strada Ferrata da Milano a Monza ("Imperial Royal Privileged Railway from Milan to Monza") on 18 August 1840, the second railway opened in Italy after the Naples–Portici railway line. The government originally intended to permit the line to be extended to Bergamo, but had intended that a separate concession be granted for a line from Milan to Como. Instead, it decided to scale down the project by allowing the Monza line to be extended to Como. On 10 October 1849 line was opened from Monza to Camnago in Lentate sul Seveso and it was extended to Camerlata on 6 December. The line was completed to Como in 1875. It was part of the Società per le strade ferrate dell'Alta Italia (Upper Italian Railways) from 1865, the Società per le Strade Ferrate del Mediterraneo (Mediterranean Railway Company) from 1885 and Ferrovie dello Stato from 1905.

== Services ==
Since 14 December 2008 suburban services on this line between Como and Milano Porta Garibaldi have been operated hourly by Trenitalia as line S11 of the Milan Suburban Railway Network. From 12 December 2004 regional passenger trains had been operated by TiLo ("Treni Regionali Ticino Lombardia", a joint venture of Ferrovie dello Stato and Swiss Federal Railways). Line S11 runs, as of 2024, every 30 minutes per direction, alternatively with terminus at Como San Giovanni or Chiasso; it is operated by Trenord, as most of Milan S lines.

Line S9 operates between Saronno and Albairate-Vermezzo via the ring railway. Camnago-Lentate station is the northern terminus of line S4, using the Camnago–Seveso link of the Milan–Asso line, and provides a link to Milan Cadorna station and the lines of Ferrovie Nord Milano (FNM); lines S4 and S11 are scheduled in order to allow for interchange in both directions at Camnago-Lentate.

Additionally, regional express trains run hourly from Locarno to Milano Centrale, using this railway for part of their route and calling only at Chiasso, Como San Giovanni, Como Camerlata, Seregno and Monza.

The section between Milan and Monza is also used by lines S7 and S8 of Milan suburban network to Lecco, respectively via Molteno and via Carnate, regional trains to Bergamo and RegioExpress trains to Lecco, Sondrio and Tirano, while the short section between Como and Chiasso is used by lines S10 and S40 of the "Rete celere ticinese", managed by TiLo.

In 2006 integrated ticketing and subscriptions allowing travel using a single ticket on trains of both LeNord, now Trenord (FNM passenger services) and TiLo were introduced to facilitate rail traffic between Brianza and Milan. In 2019, integrated tickets were extended to include every form of public transport in Monza-Brianza and Milano provinces.

The line is also used by long-distance Eurocity trains to and from Basel and Zürich.

The line is used by many railway companies to transport goods to and from Switzerland and northern Europe.

== See also ==
- List of railway lines in Italy
