= Maccagno railway station =

Railway station in Italy

Maccagno
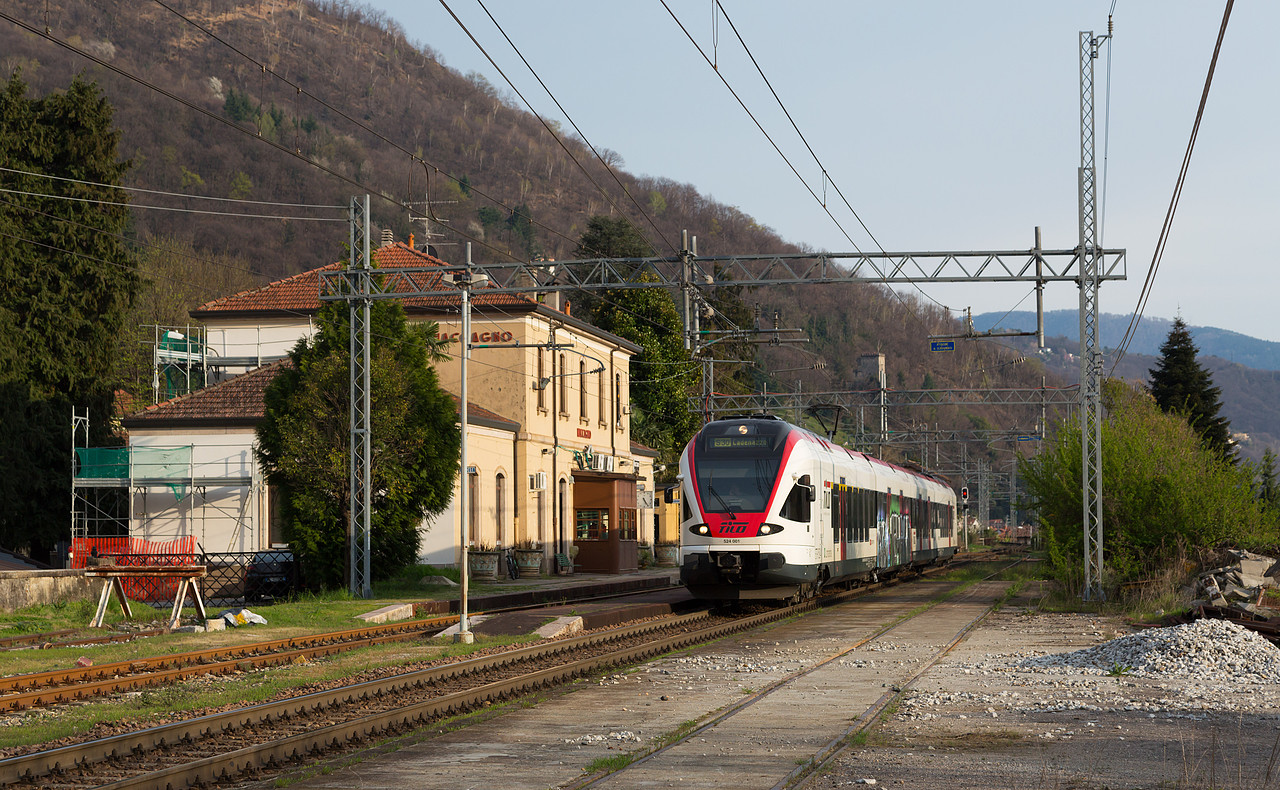
- An S30 at the station in 2014

General information
- Location: Maccagno con Pino e Veddasca, Lombardy; Italy
- Coordinates: 46°02′43″N 8°44′08″E
- Elevation: 218 m (715 ft)
- Line: Cadenazzo–Luino line
- Distance: 56.7 km (35.2 mi) from Oleggio
- Train operators: Treni Regionali Ticino Lombardia
- Connections: CTPI buses

Services
| Preceding station | TiLo | Following station |
|---|---|---|
| Pino-Tronzano towards Cadenazzo | S30 | Colmegna towards Gallarate |
Location

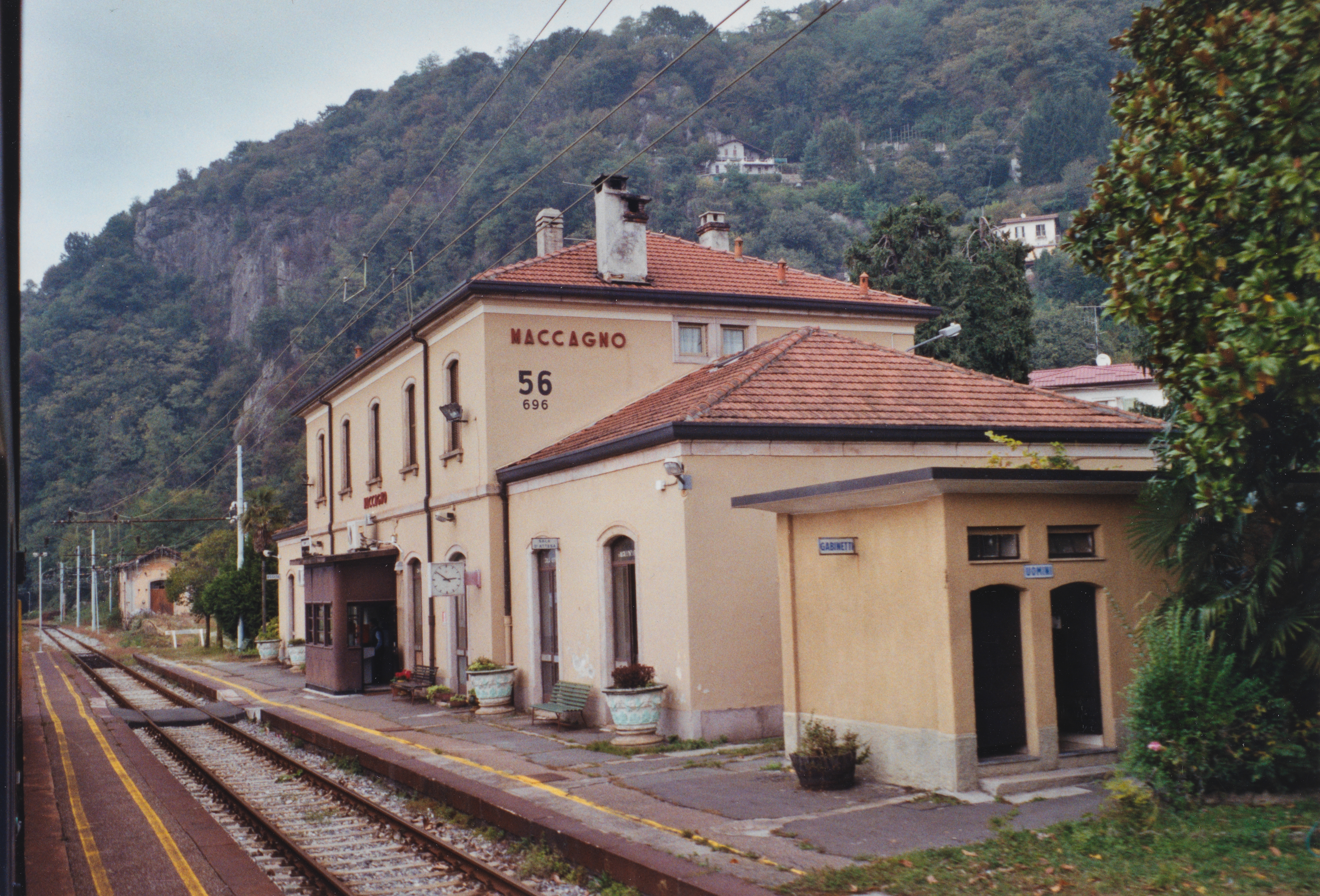
The station in 2002

Maccagno railway station (Italian: Stazione di Maccagno) is a railway station in the comune of Maccagno con Pino e Veddasca, in the Italian region of Lombardy. It is an intermediate stop on the standard gauge Cadenazzo–Luino line of Rete Ferroviaria Italiana.

== Services ==
As of the December 2021 timetable change, the following services stop at Maccagno:

- S30: service every two hours between Cadenazzo and Luino or Gallarate.
