= Caldè railway station =

Railway station in Italy

Caldè
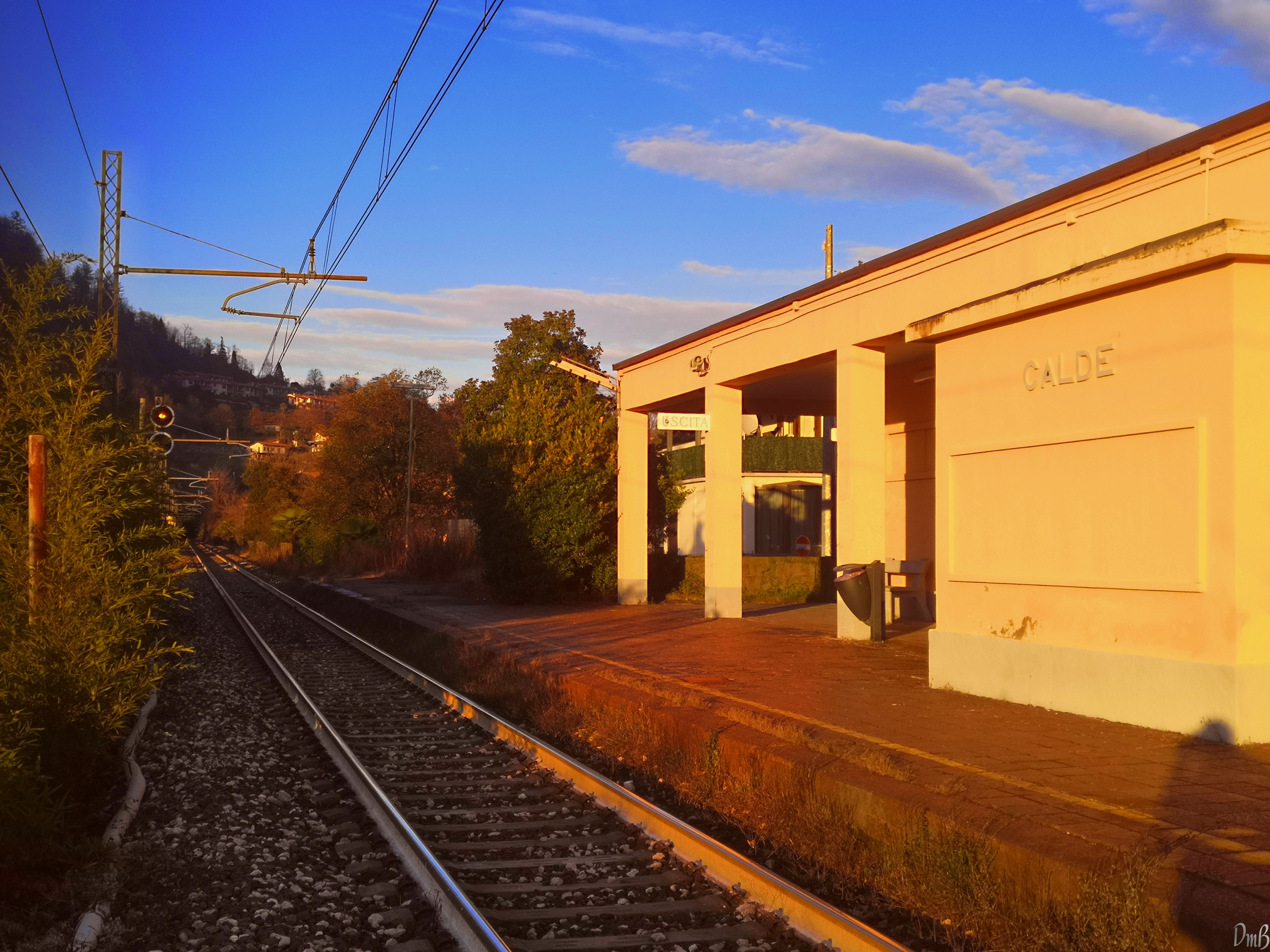
- The station in 2020

General information
- Location: Castelveccana, Lombardy; Italy
- Coordinates: 45°56′44″N 8°39′48″E
- Elevation: 213 m (699 ft)
- Lines: Luino–Milan line; Luino–Oleggio line
- Distance: 42.1 km (26.2 mi) from Oleggio
- Train operators: Treni Regionali Ticino Lombardia
- Connections: CTPI buses

Services
Preceding station	Trenord	Following station
Porto Valtravaglia towards Luino	R21	Laveno-Mombello towards Milano Porta Garibaldi
Preceding station	TiLo	Following station
Porto Valtravaglia towards Cadenazzo	S30	Laveno-Mombello towards Gallarate
Location

Caldè railway station (Italian: Stazione di Caldè) is a railway station in the comune of Castelveccana, in the Italian region of Lombardy. It is an intermediate stop on the standard gauge Luino–Milan and Luino–Oleggio lines of Rete Ferroviaria Italiana.

== Services ==
As of the December 2021 timetable change, the following services stop at Caldè:

- Regionale: regular service between Luino and Gallarate and rush-hour service to Milano Porta Garibaldi.
- S30: rush-hour service between Cadenazzo and Gallarate.
