= Laveno-Mombello railway station =

Railway station in Italy

Laveno-Mombello
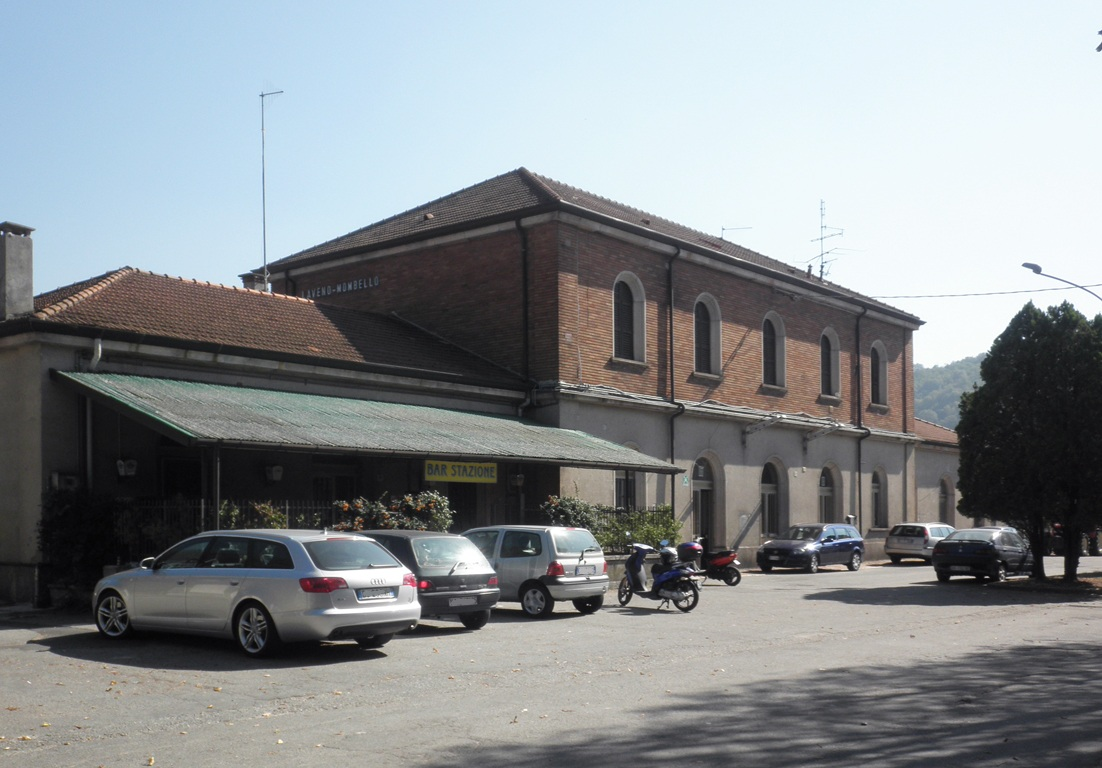
- The station building in 2011

General information
- Location: Via Diaz 21; Laveno-Mombello, Varese, Lombardy; Italy
- Coordinates: 45°54′12″N 8°37′29″E
- Elevation: 206 m (676 ft)
- Owner: Rete Ferroviaria Italiana
- Lines: Luino–Milan line; Luino–Oleggio line
- Distance: 31.2 km (19.4 mi) from Gallarate; 36.1 km (22.4 mi) from Oleggio
- Train operators: Treni Regionali Ticino Lombardia; Trenord
- Connections: CTPI buses

Other information
- Classification: silver

History
- Opened: 4 December 1882

Services
Preceding station	Trenord	Following station
Caldè towards Luino	R21	Sangiano towards Milano Porta Garibaldi
Leggiuno towards Sesto Calende	R24	Terminus
Preceding station	TiLo	Following station
Caldè towards Cadenazzo	S30	Sangiano towards Gallarate
Location

Laveno-Mombello railway station (Italian: Stazione di Laveno-Mombello) is a railway station in Italy. It is junction of the lines Luino–Milan and Luino–Oleggio. It serves the town of Laveno-Mombello, and is joined by a junction track to the Laveno-Mombello Lago railway station, managed by Ferrovienord. No trains operate between the two stations, which are located less than 1 kilometre (0.62 mi) apart.

== Services ==
As of the December 2021 timetable change, the following services stop at Porto Valtravaglia:

- Regionale: regular service between Luino and Gallarate and rush-hour service to Milano Porta Garibaldi.
- S30: rush-hour service between Cadenazzo and Gallarate.

Until December 2013 there were also a few regional trains to Novara, operated by the Italian railway company Trenitalia. A replacement bus service, designated R24, runs every few hours to Sesto Calende.
