= Pino–Tronzano railway station =

Railway station in Italy

Pino–Tronzano
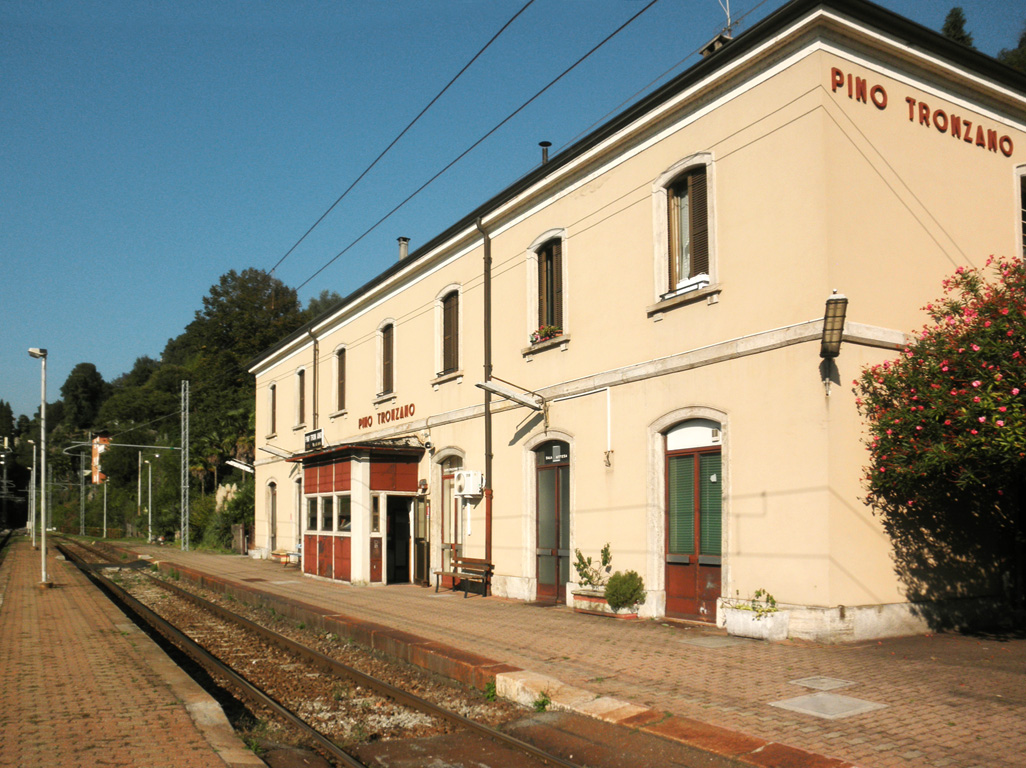
- The station building in 2011

General information
- Location: Maccagno con Pino e Veddasca, Lombardy; Italy
- Coordinates: 46°05′56″N 8°44′13″E
- Elevation: 220 m (720 ft)
- Line: Cadenazzo–Luino line
- Distance: 63.7 km (39.6 mi) from Oleggio
- Train operators: Treni Regionali Ticino Lombardia
- Connections: CTPI buses

Services
| Preceding station | TiLo | Following station |
|---|---|---|
| Ranzo-Sant'Abbondio towards Cadenazzo | S30 | Maccagno towards Gallarate |
Location

Pino–Tronzano railway station (Italian: Stazione di Pino–Tronzano) is a railway station in the comune of Maccagno con Pino e Veddasca, in the Italian region of Lombardy. It is an intermediate stop on the standard gauge Cadenazzo–Luino line of Rete Ferroviaria Italiana and is final station south of the border between Switzerland and Italy.

== Services ==
As of the December 2021 timetable change, the following services stop at Pino–Tronzano:

- S30: service every two hours between Cadenazzo and Luino or Gallarate.
