= Colmegna railway station =

Railway station in Italy

Colmegna
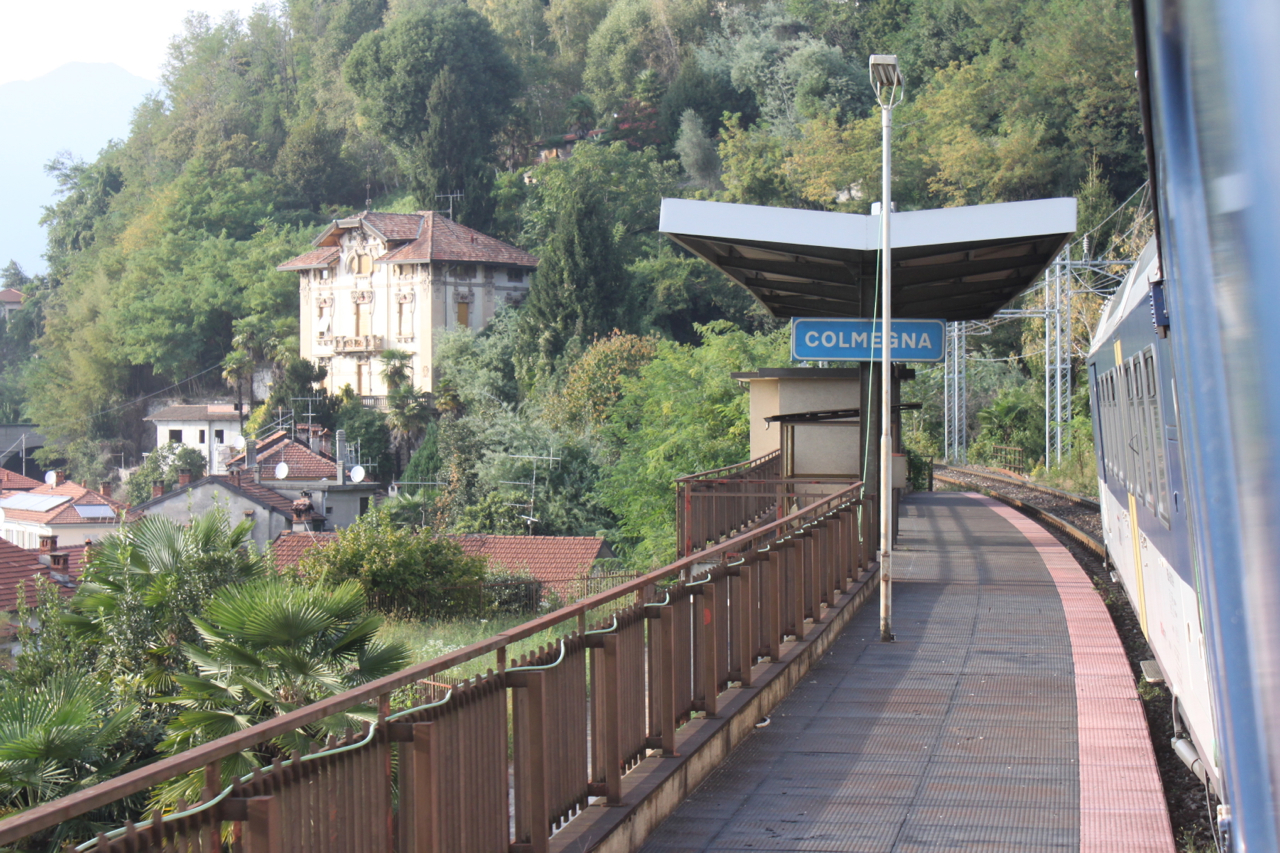
- The station platform in 2011

General information
- Location: Luino, Lombardy; Italy
- Coordinates: 46°01′29″N 8°45′07″E
- Elevation: 210 m (690 ft)
- Line: Cadenazzo–Luino line
- Distance: 54.3 km (33.7 mi) from Oleggio
- Train operators: Treni Regionali Ticino Lombardia
- Connections: CTPI buses

Services
Preceding station	TiLo	Following station
Maccagno towards Cadenazzo	S30	Luino towards Gallarate
Location

Colmegna railway station (Italian: Stazione di Colmegna) is a railway station in the comune of Luino, in the Italian region of Lombardy. It is an intermediate stop on the standard gauge Cadenazzo–Luino line of Rete Ferroviaria Italiana.

== Services ==
As of the December 2021 timetable change, the following services stop at Colmegna:

- S30: service every two hours between Cadenazzo and Luino or Gallarate.
