= Besozzo railway station =

Railway station in Italy

Besozzo
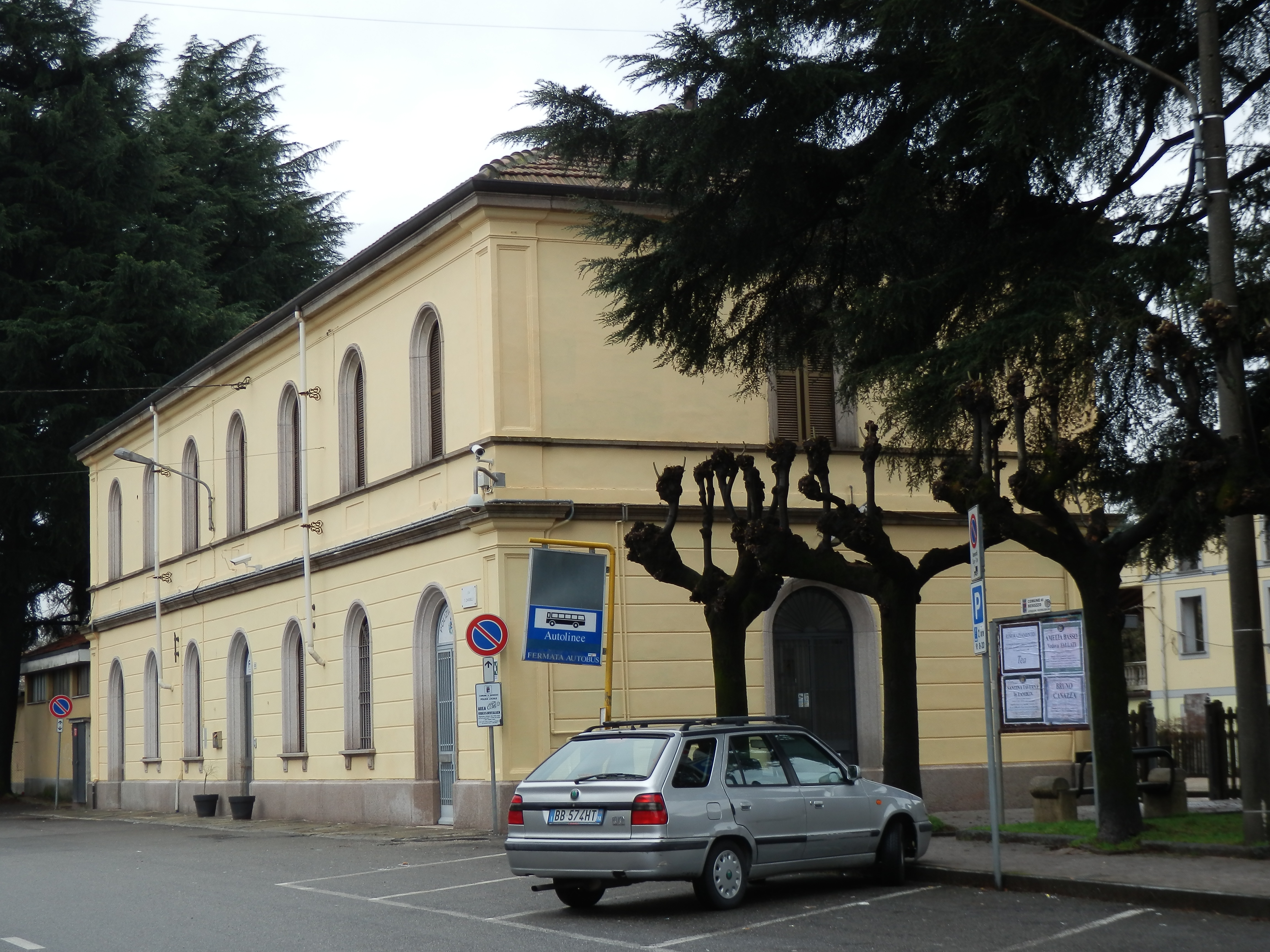
- The station building in 2014

General information
- Location: Besozzo, Varese, Lombardy; Italy
- Coordinates: 45°50′32″N 8°39′47″E
- Elevation: 231 m (758 ft)
- Line: Luino–Milan line
- Distance: 23.6 km (14.7 mi) from Gallarate
- Train operators: Treni Regionali Ticino Lombardia; Trenord
- Connections: CTPI buses

Services
Preceding station	Trenord	Following station
Sangiano towards Luino	R21	Travedona-Biandronno towards Milano Porta Garibaldi
Preceding station	TiLo	Following station
Sangiano towards Cadenazzo	S30	Travedona-Biandronno towards Gallarate
Location

Besozzo railway station (Italian: Stazione di Besozzo) is a railway station in the comune of Besozzo, in the Italian region of Lombardy. It is an intermediate stop on the standard gauge Luino–Milan line of Rete Ferroviaria Italiana. The station was also a stop on the Varese–Angera tramway from 1914 to 1940.

== History ==
In 1881, due to pressure from entrepreneurs and administrators, aware of the need to develop the railway network, it took shape the construction project of the Gallarate-Laveno line, which passed through Besozzo. A horizon of new activity was seen open: the citizens found themselves in conditions to be able to use that very powerful vehicle promptly and without serious difficulties trade, that was the railway.

There is no design documentation in our archives regarding the station building Besozzo railway station, however we can see the similarity of the buildings built on the Luino-Gallarate line to the Varano Borghi or Besnate stops, built by the railway administration of the State. The construction project of the access road was entrusted to the engineer Alessandro Besozzi in 1883, but, in a short time, the intensification of passenger and goods traffic made it necessary the purchase of land to build a sidewalk on the side of the road. Subsequently, in 1905 engineer Berrini from Angera designed a new access road, so wide that it required works demolition of some blocks of flats.

== Services ==
As of the December 2021 timetable change, the following services stop at Besozzo:

- Regionale: regular service between Luino and Gallarate and rush-hour service to Milano Porta Garibaldi.
- S30: rush-hour service between Cadenazzo and Gallarate.
