= Mornago–Cimbro railway station =

Railway station in Italy

Mornago–Cimbro
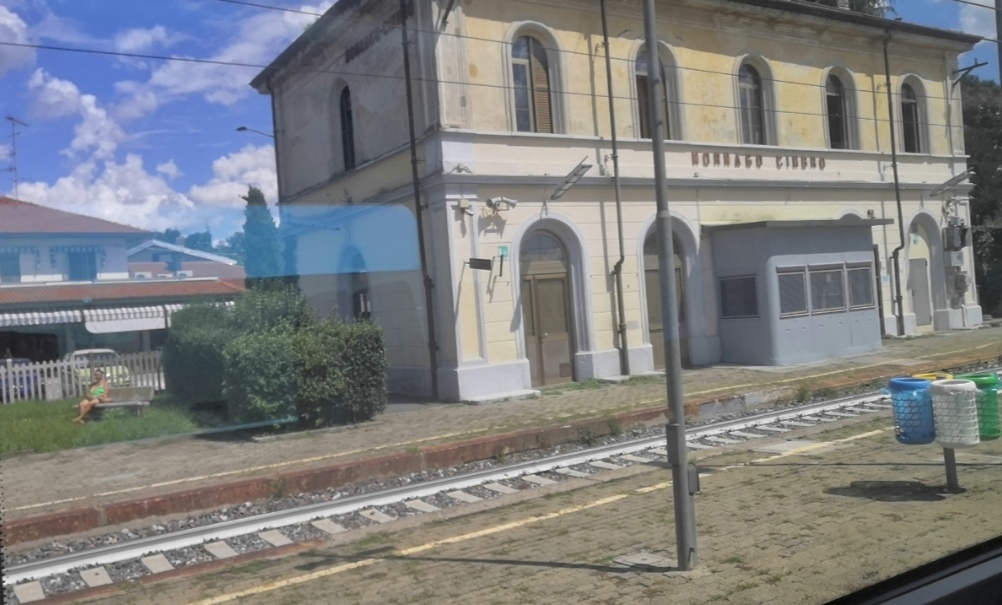
- The station in 2022

General information
- Location: Mornago, Varese, Lombardy; Italy
- Coordinates: 45°43′47″N 8°44′03″E
- Elevation: 274 m (899 ft)
- Line: Luino–Milan line
- Distance: 9.5 km (5.9 mi) from Gallarate
- Train operators: Treni Regionali Ticino Lombardia; Trenord
- Connections: CTPI buses

Services
Preceding station	Trenord	Following station
Ternate-Varano Borghi towards Luino	R21	Besnate towards Milano Porta Garibaldi
Preceding station	TiLo	Following station
Ternate-Varano Borghi towards Cadenazzo	S30	Besnate towards Gallarate
Location

Mornago–Cimbro railway station (Italian: Stazione di Mornago–Cimbro) is a railway station in the comune of Mornago, in the Italian region of Lombardy. It is an intermediate stop on the standard gauge Luino–Milan line of Rete Ferroviaria Italiana.

== Services ==
As of the December 2021 timetable change, the following services stop at Mornago-Cimbro:

- Regionale: regular service between Luino and Gallarate and rush-hour service to Milano Porta Garibaldi.
- S30: rush-hour service between Cadenazzo and Gallarate.
