= Porto Valtravaglia railway station =

Railway station in Italy

Porto Valtravaglia
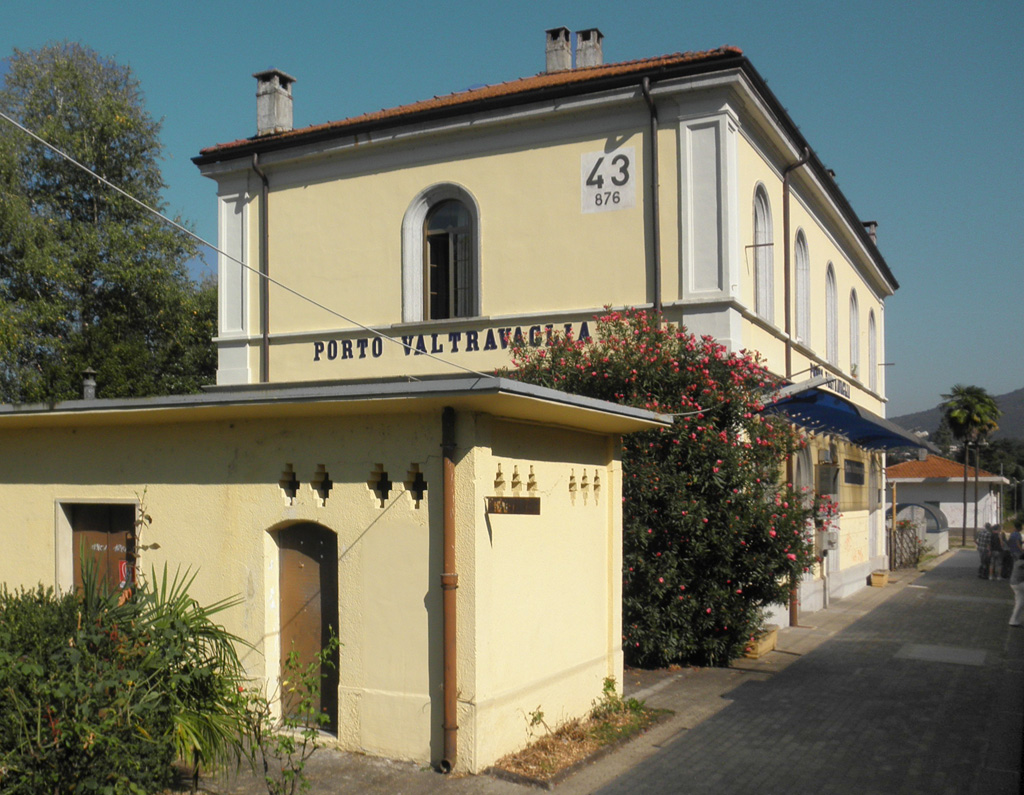
- The station building in 2011

General information
- Location: Porto Valtravaglia, Lombardy; Italy
- Coordinates: 45°57′30″N 8°40′27″E
- Elevation: 216 m (709 ft)
- Lines: Luino–Milan line; Luino–Oleggio line
- Distance: 43.9 km (27.3 mi) from Oleggio
- Train operators: Treni Regionali Ticino Lombardia
- Connections: CTPI buses

Services
Preceding station	Trenord	Following station
Luino Terminus	R21	Caldè towards Milano Porta Garibaldi
Preceding station	TiLo	Following station
Luino towards Cadenazzo	S30	Caldè towards Gallarate
Location

Porto Valtravaglia railway station (Italian: Stazione di Porto Valtravaglia) is a railway station in the comune of Porto Valtravaglia, in the Italian region of Lombardy. It is an intermediate stop on the standard gauge Luino–Milan and Luino–Oleggio lines of Rete Ferroviaria Italiana.

== Services ==
As of the December 2021 timetable change, the following services stop at Porto Valtravaglia:

- Regionale: regular service between Luino and Gallarate and rush-hour service to Milano Porta Garibaldi.
- S30: rush-hour service between Cadenazzo and Gallarate.
