= Ternate–Varano Borghi railway station =

Railway station in Italy

Ternate–Varano Borghi
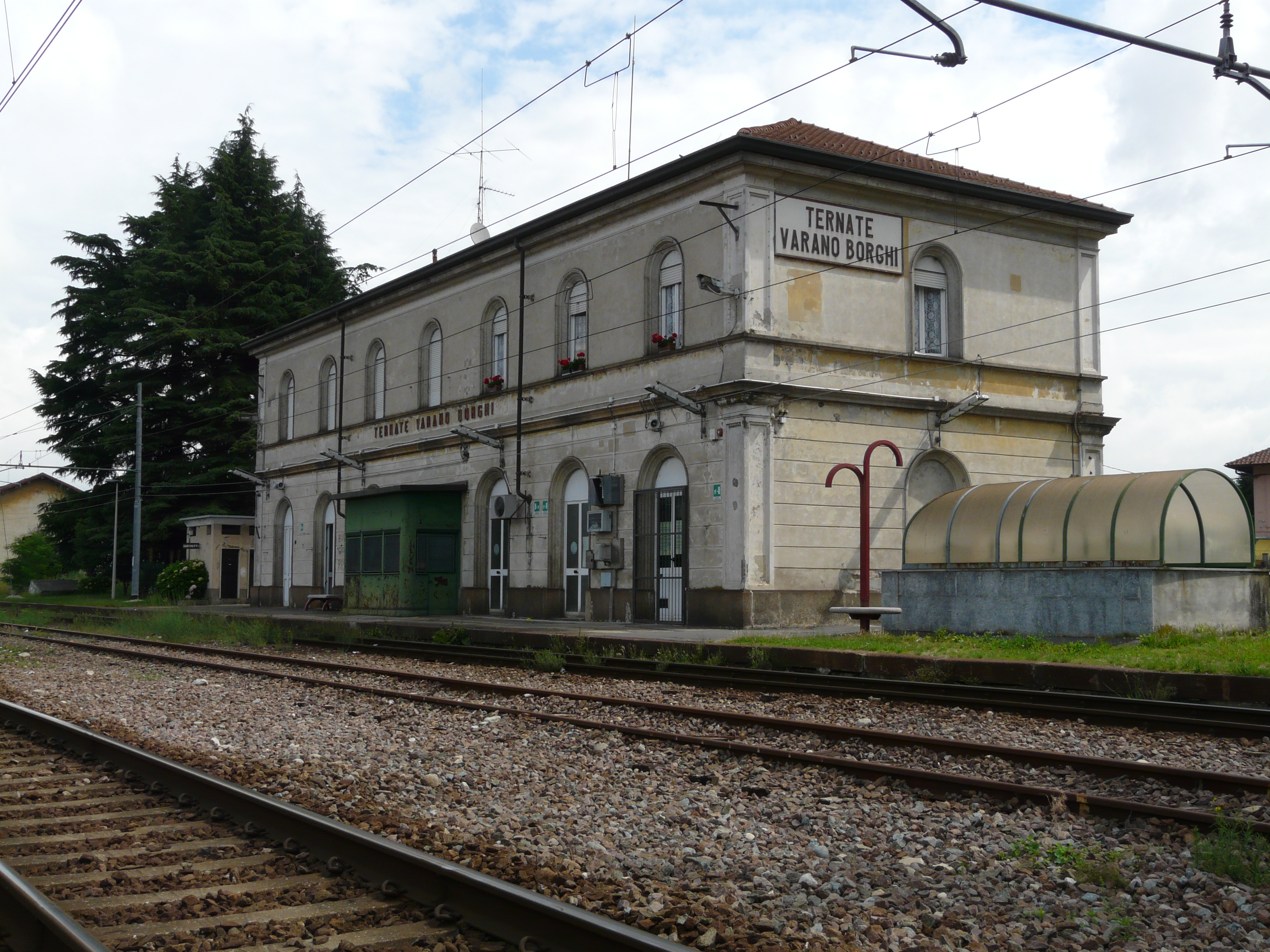
- The station in 2011

General information
- Location: Ternate, Varese, Lombardy; Italy
- Coordinates: 45°46′54″N 8°42′01″E
- Elevation: 258 m (846 ft)
- Line: Luino–Milan line
- Distance: 16 km (9.9 mi) from Gallarate
- Train operators: Treni Regionali Ticino Lombardia; Trenord
- Connections: CTPI buses

Services
Preceding station	Trenord	Following station
Travedona-Biandronno towards Luino	R21	Mornago-Cimbro towards Milano Porta Garibaldi
Preceding station	TiLo	Following station
Travedona-Biandronno towards Cadenazzo	S30	Mornago-Cimbro towards Gallarate
Location

Ternate–Varano Borghi railway station (Italian: Stazione di Ternate–Varano Borghi) is a railway station in the comune of Ternate, in the Italian region of Lombardy. It is an intermediate stop on the standard gauge Luino–Milan line of Rete Ferroviaria Italiana.

== Services ==
As of the December 2021 timetable change, the following services stop at Ternate–Varano Borghi:

- Regionale: regular service between Luino and Gallarate and rush-hour service to Milano Porta Garibaldi.
- S30: rush-hour service between Cadenazzo and Gallarate.
