= Besnate railway station =

Railway station in Italy

Besnate
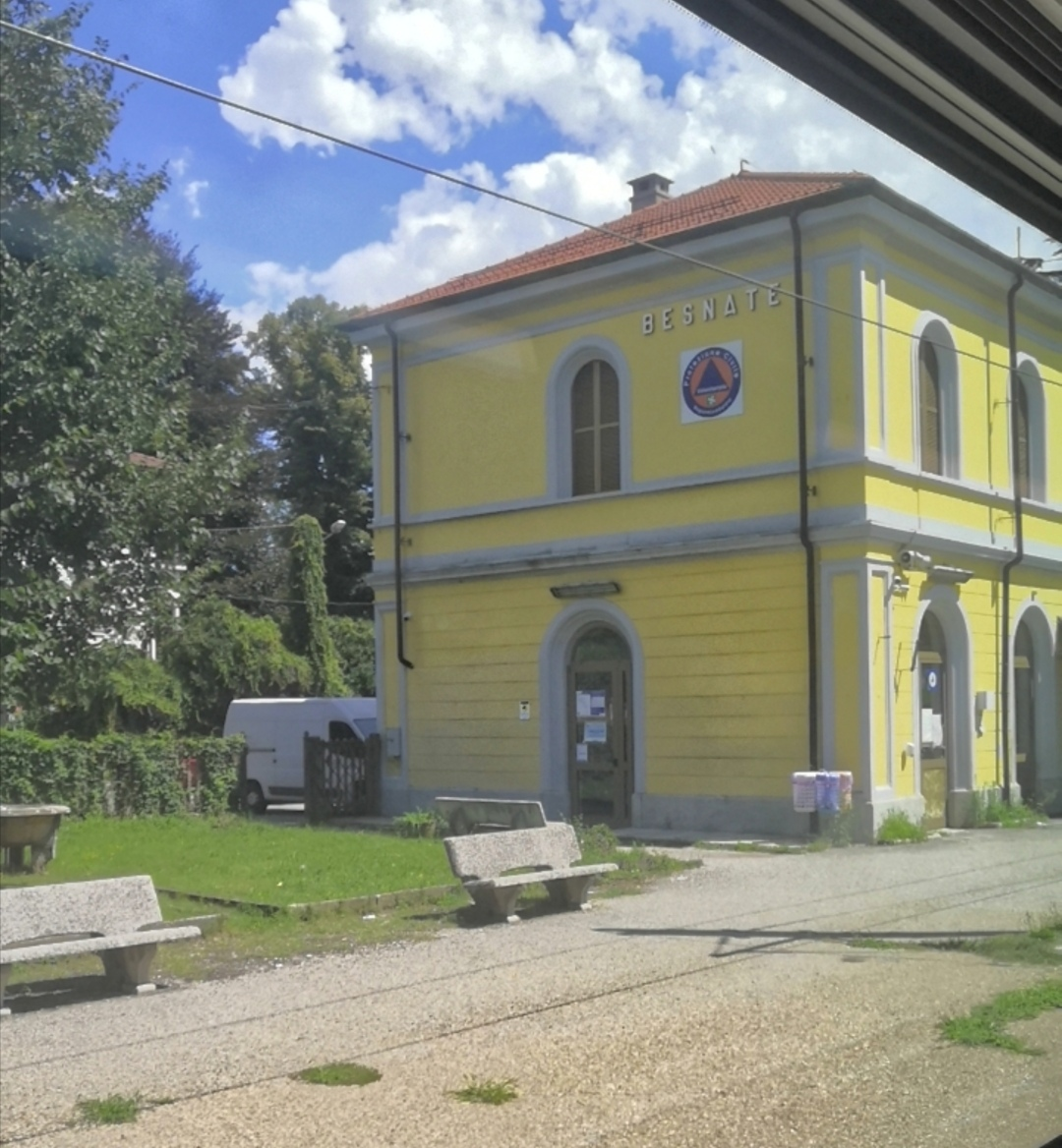
- The station in 2022

General information
- Location: Besnate, Varese, Lombardy; Italy
- Coordinates: 45°41′43″N 8°45′40″E
- Elevation: 277 m (909 ft)
- Line: Luino–Milan line
- Distance: 5.1 km (3.2 mi) from Gallarate
- Train operators: Treni Regionali Ticino Lombardia; Trenord

Services
Preceding station	Trenord	Following station
Mornago-Cimbro towards Luino	R21	Gallarate towards Milano Porta Garibaldi
Preceding station	TiLo	Following station
Mornago-Cimbro towards Cadenazzo	S30	Gallarate Terminus
Location

Besnate railway station (Italian: Stazione di Besnate) is a railway station in the comune of Besnate, in the Italian region of Lombardy. It is an intermediate stop on the standard gauge Luino–Milan line of Rete Ferroviaria Italiana.

== Services ==
As of the December 2021 timetable change, the following services stop at Besnate:

- Regionale: regular service between Luino and Gallarate and rush-hour service to Milano Porta Garibaldi.
- S30: rush-hour service between Cadenazzo and Gallarate.
