= Travedona–Biandronno railway station =

Railway station in Italy

Travedona–Biandronno
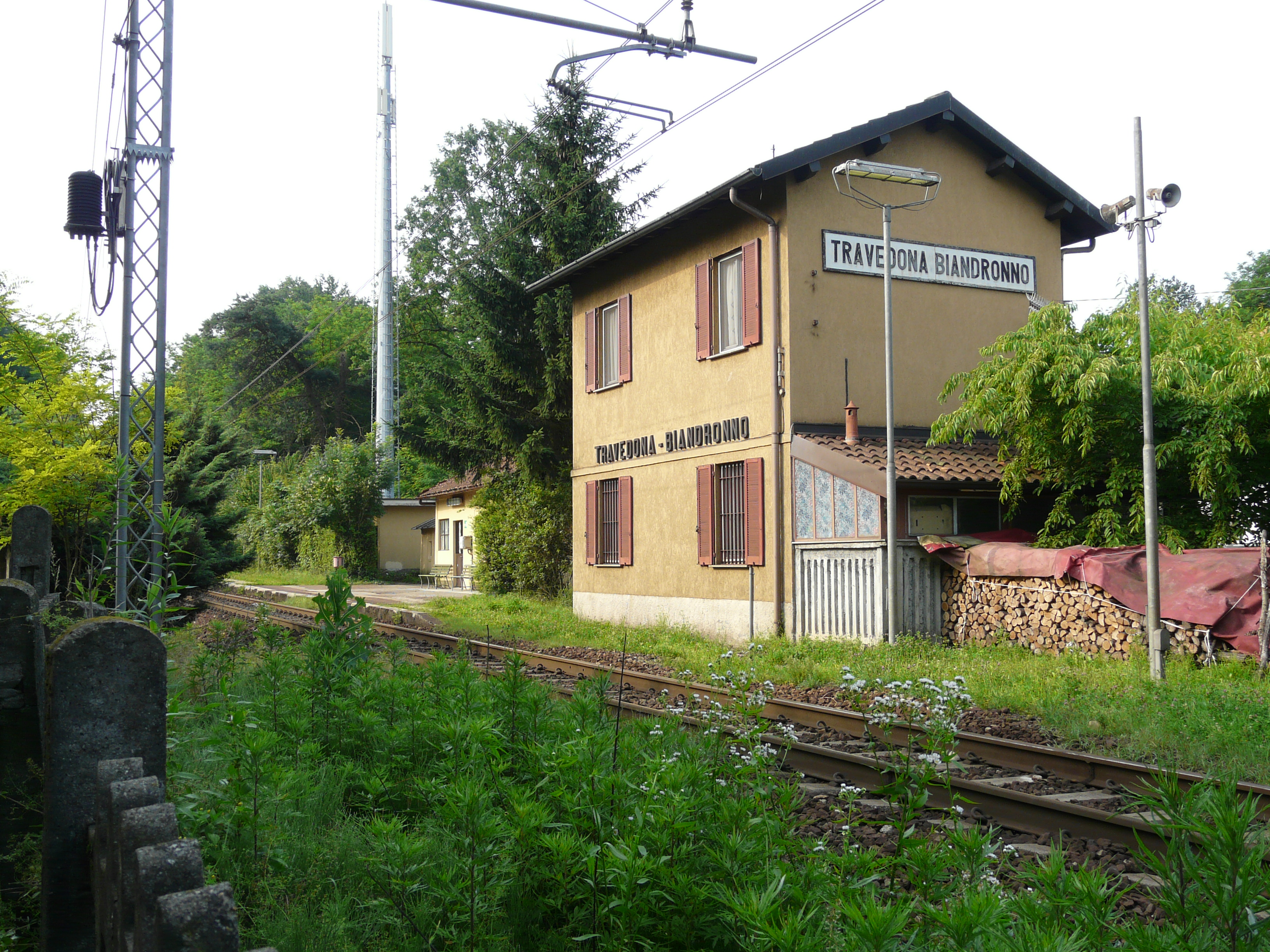
- The station in 2011

General information
- Location: Travedona-Monate, Varese, Lombardy; Italy
- Coordinates: 45°48′35″N 8°41′47″E
- Elevation: 249 m (817 ft)
- Line: Luino–Milan line
- Distance: 19.1 km (11.9 mi) from Gallarate
- Train operators: Treni Regionali Ticino Lombardia; Trenord

Services
Preceding station	Trenord	Following station
Besozzo towards Luino	R21	Ternate-Varano Borghi towards Milano Porta Garibaldi
Preceding station	TiLo	Following station
Besozzo towards Cadenazzo	S30	Ternate-Varano Borghi towards Gallarate
Location

Travedona–Biandronno railway station (Italian: Stazione di Travedona–Biandronno) is a railway station in the comune of Travedona-Monate, in the Italian region of Lombardy. It is an intermediate stop on the standard gauge Luino–Milan line of Rete Ferroviaria Italiana.

== Services ==
As of the December 2021 timetable change, the following services stop at Travedona–Biandronno:

- Regionale: regular service between Luino and Gallarate and rush-hour service to Milano Porta Garibaldi.
- S30: rush-hour service between Cadenazzo and Gallarate.
