= Giona (river) =

Stream in Switzerland

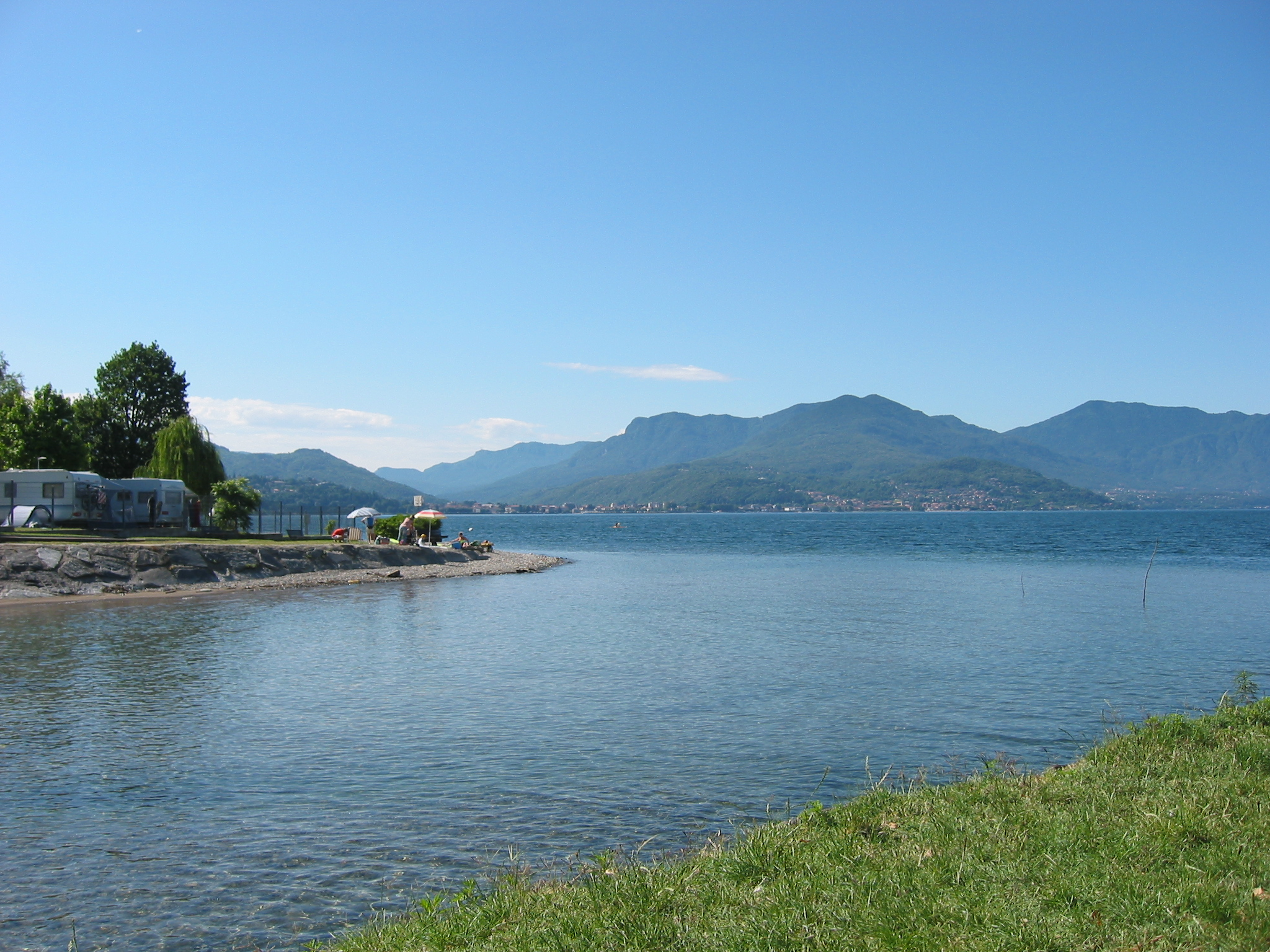

Location
- Country: Switzerland, Italy

Physical characteristics
- Source
  - location: Monte Tamaro
  - elevation: 1,100 m (3,600 ft)
- Mouth
  - location: Lago Maggiore at Maccagno
  - coordinates: 46.0390°N 8.7325°E
- Length: 10.2 km (6.3 mi)

Basin features
- Progression: Lake Maggiore→ Ticino→ Po→ Adriatic Sea

The Giona is a ‘torrent’, or intermittent stream, which rises on the slopes of Monte Tamaro, in the Swiss canton of Ticino. After about 2 kilometres (1.2 mi), it enters the Italian province of Varese, forming the Val Veddasca before entering Lake Maggiore at Maccagno. Its course passes through the communes of Indemini in Switzerland and Veddasca, Curiglia con Monteviasco, Dumenza and Maccagno in Italy.

The fish found in the river are predominantly Salmonidae, Cyprinidae and Cottidae, in particular brown trout, grayling, chub, vairone and European bullhead.

The river is put to use as a source of hydropower.
