= Sangiano railway station =

Railway station in Italy

Sangiano
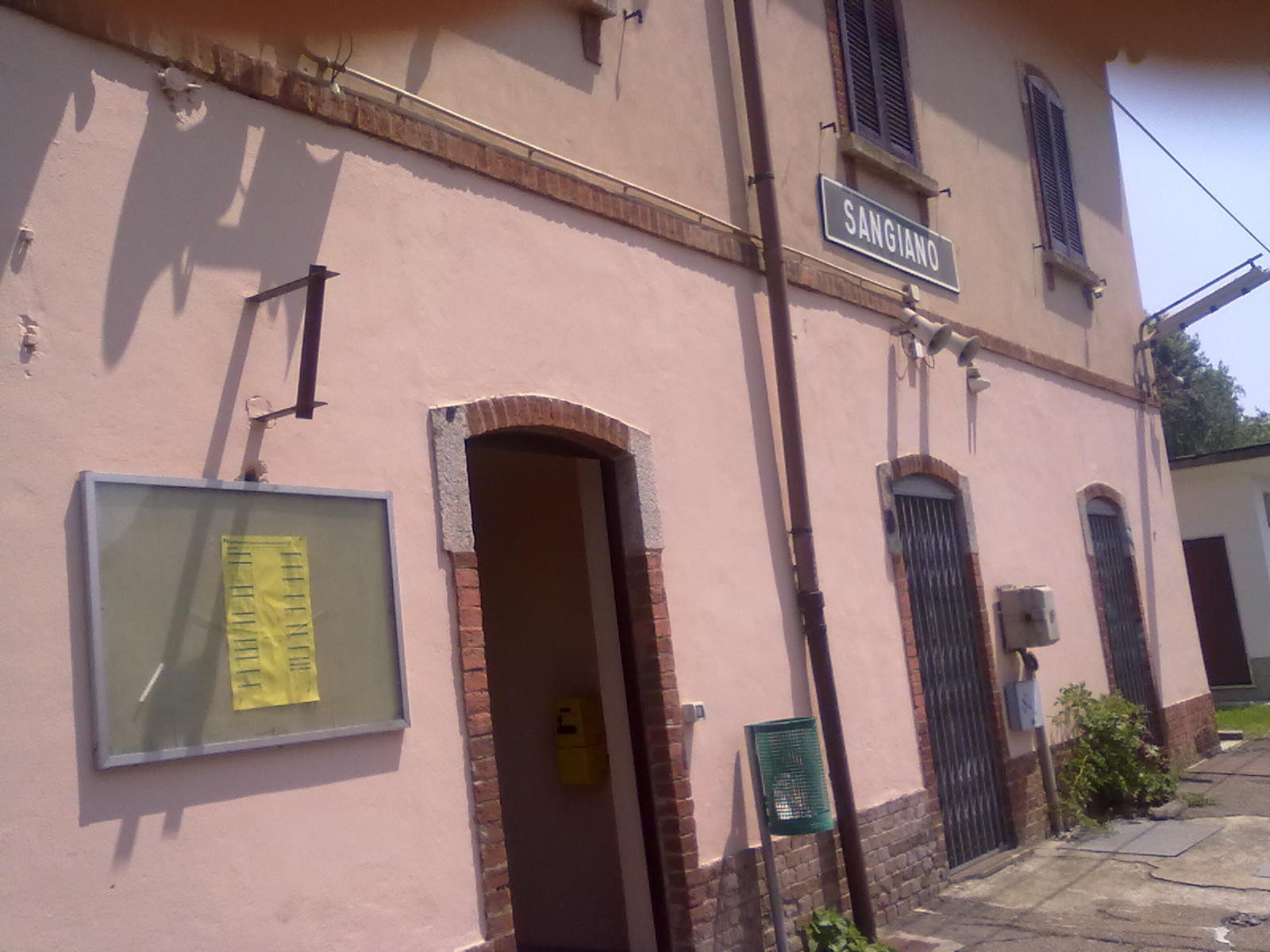
- The station in 2010

General information
- Location: Sangiano, Varese, Lombardy; Italy
- Coordinates: 45°52′28″N 8°37′51″E
- Elevation: 223 m (732 ft)
- Line: Luino–Milan line
- Distance: 28.0 km (17.4 mi) from Gallarate
- Train operators: Treni Regionali Ticino Lombardia; Trenord

Services
Preceding station	Trenord	Following station
Laveno-Mombello towards Luino	R21	Besozzo towards Milano Porta Garibaldi
Preceding station	TiLo	Following station
Laveno-Mombello towards Cadenazzo	S30	Besozzo towards Gallarate
Location

Sangiano railway station (Italian: Stazione di Sangiano) is a railway station in the comune of Sangiano, in the Italian region of Lombardy. It is an intermediate stop on the standard gauge Luino–Milan line of Rete Ferroviaria Italiana.

== Services ==
As of the December 2021 timetable change, the following services stop at Sangiano:

- Regionale: regular service between Luino and Gallarate and rush-hour service to Milano Porta Garibaldi.
- S30: rush-hour service between Cadenazzo and Gallarate.
