= Biegno =

Coordinates: 46.0850°N 8.8178°E

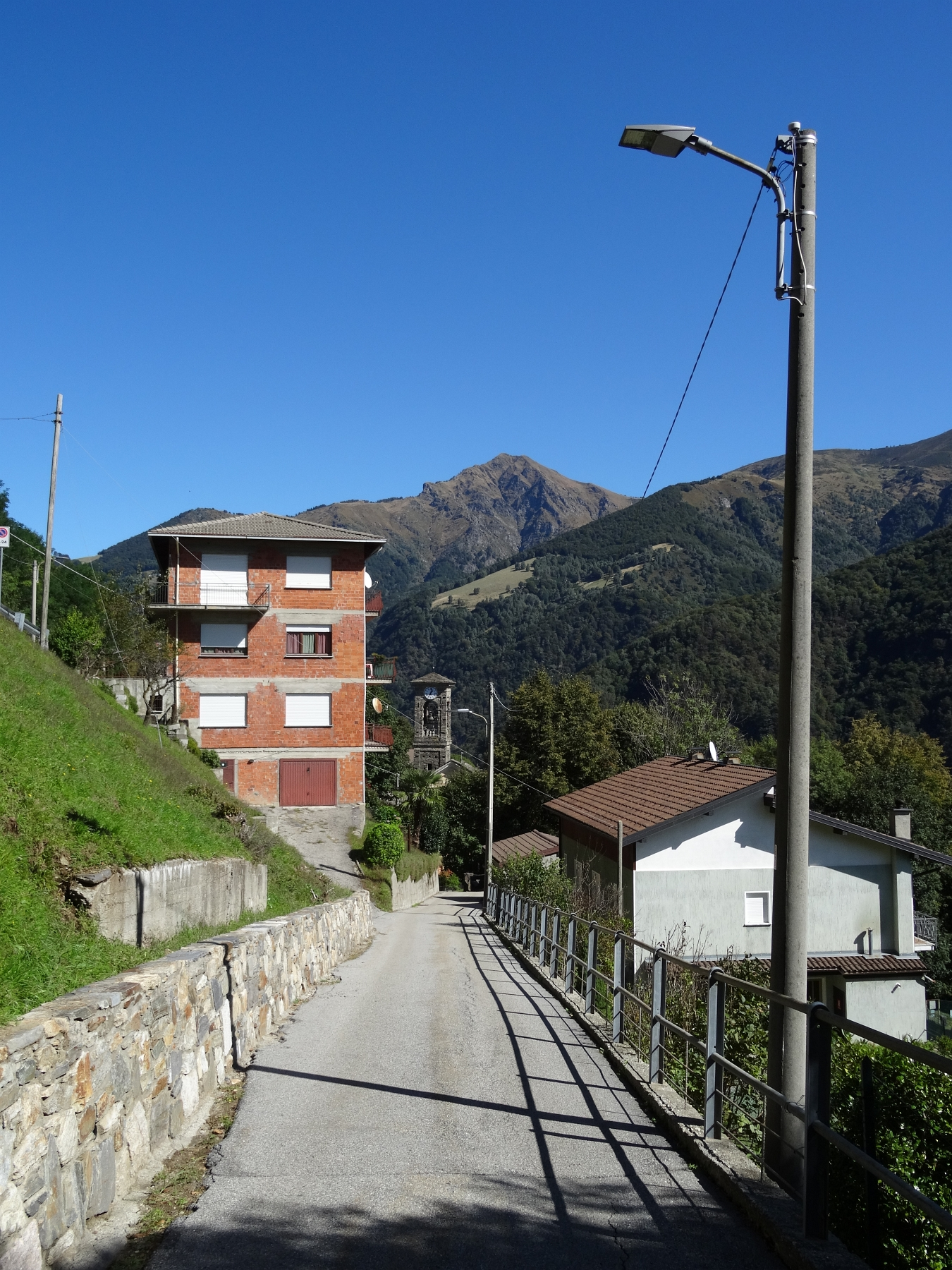

Biegno is a village in the comune of Maccagno con Pino e Veddasca in the Province of Varese in Italy. In 2001 it had a population of 90.
