= Luino–Milan railway =

Railway line in Italy

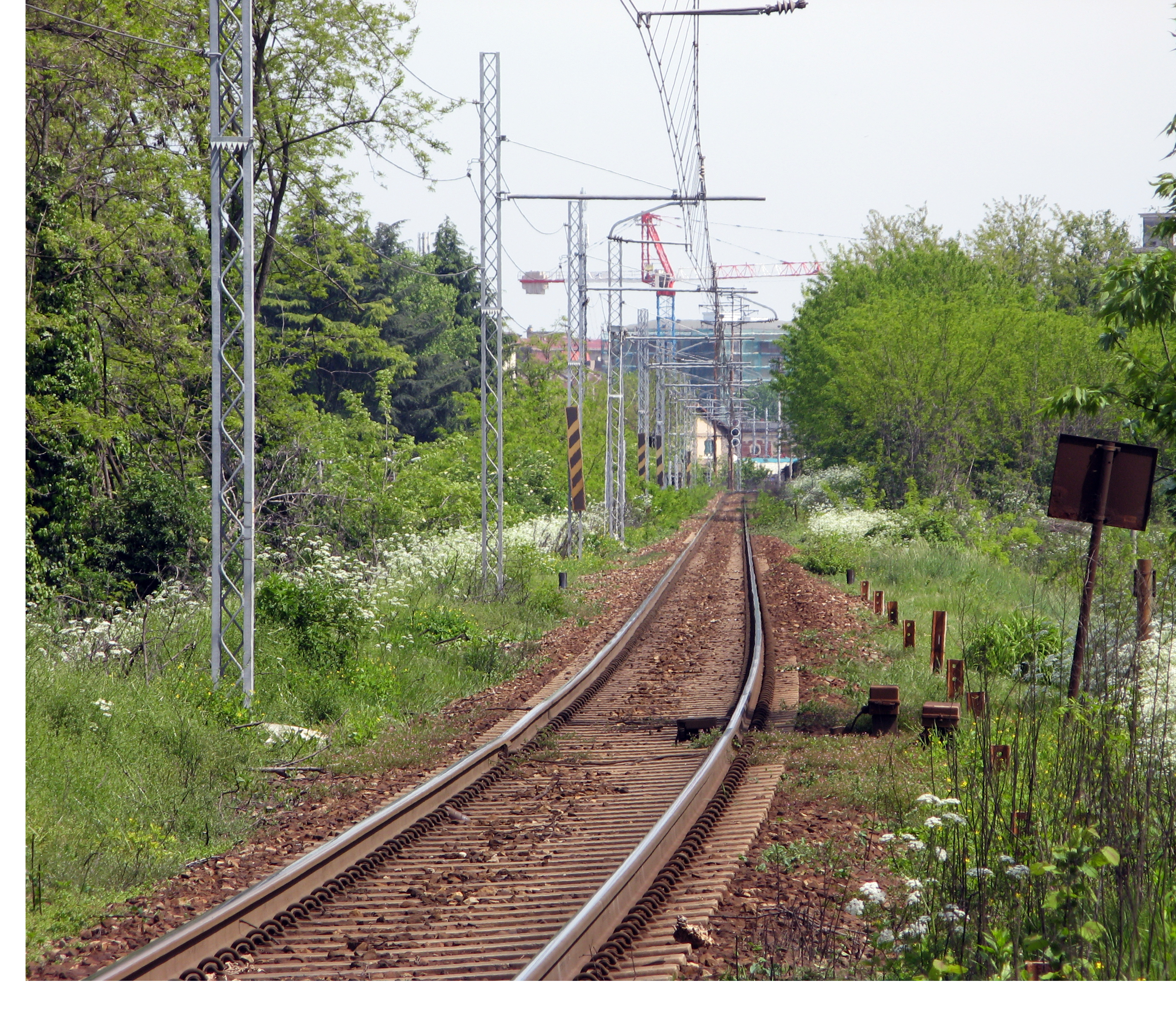

Overview
- Native name: Ferrovia Milano-Luino
- Status: in use
- Owner: RFI
- Locale: Lombardy, Italy
- Termini: Luino railway station; Milan Porta Garibaldi railway station

Service
- Type: heavy rail
- Services: R21
- Operator(s): TiLo, Trenord

History
- Opened: 17 March 1884

Technical
- Track gauge: 1,435 mm (4 ft 8 1/2 in) standard gauge
- Electrification: 3 kV DC

Luino–Milan railway is a railway line in Lombardy, Italy. It uses the tracks of the Milan–Arona railway until Gallarate.

The railway line was opened on 17 March 1884, to provide, together with the Luino–Oleggio railway, a second access to the Gotthard railway.

== Route ==
The Luino-Milan railway line spans 69km, and the journey takes an average of 2 hours and 2 minutes. The train line is operated by Trenord, who operate an average of 37 trains per day. The train stops at Luino, Porto Valtravaglia, Caldè, Laveno-Mombello FS, Sangiano, Besozzo, Bibbiena, Travedona-Biandronno, Ternate-Varano Borghi, Mornago-Cimbro, Besnate, Gallarate, Busto Arsizio, Milano Porta Garibaldi.

== See also ==
- List of railway lines in Italy
