= CTPI =

CTPI could refer to:

- Centre for Theology and Public Issues, a research centre at the University of Edinburgh
- Consorzio Trasporti Pubblici Insubria, a transport company in Italy
