= Tronzano =

Tronzano may refer to:

- Tronzano Lago Maggiore, Italian municipality in the province of Varese
- Tronzano Vercellese, Italian municipality in the province of Vercelli
