= Veddasca =

Former comune in Lombardy, Italy

- Comune
- Comune di Veddasca
- Coat of arms

- Location within Italy Location within Lombardy
- Coordinates: 46°4′N 8°48′E
- Country: Italy
- Region: Lombardy
- Province: Varese (VA)
- Frazioni: Alpe Cadrigna, Alpe Cangei, Alpe Casmera, Alpe Comendone, Alpe Feed, Alpe Prà del Cotto, Alpe Quadra, Alpe Rassini, Armio, Bacinetto, Biegno, Cadero, Caldera, Cangili, Costa del Fajetto, Fontana, Graglio, Lozzo, Monte Cadrigna, Monte Paglione, Monterecchio, Monte Sirti, Nove Fontane, Passo della Forcora, Passo Fontana Rossa, Pian della Croce, Pian Poso, Ponte Delà, Sasso Corbaro

Government
  - Mayor: Roberto Calebasso

Area
  - Total: 16.6 km^{2} (6.4 sq mi)
- Elevation: 896 m (2,940 ft)

Population (Dec. 2004)
  - Total: 315
  - Density: 19.0/km^{2} (49.1/sq mi)
- Demonym: Veddaschesi
- Time zone: UTC+1 (CET)
  - Summer (DST): UTC+2 (CEST)
- Postal code: 21010
- Dialing code: 0332

Veddasca was a comune (municipality) in the Province of Varese in the Italian region Lombardy, located about 70 kilometres (43 mi) northwest of Milan and about 30 kilometres (19 mi) north of Varese in the Val Veddasca, on the border with Switzerland. In 2014 it merges with Maccagno and Pino sulla Sponda del Lago Maggiore in the new municipality of Maccagno con Pino e Veddasca
