= Piero Folli =

Italian antifascist parish priest

The Reverend Fr. Piero Folli
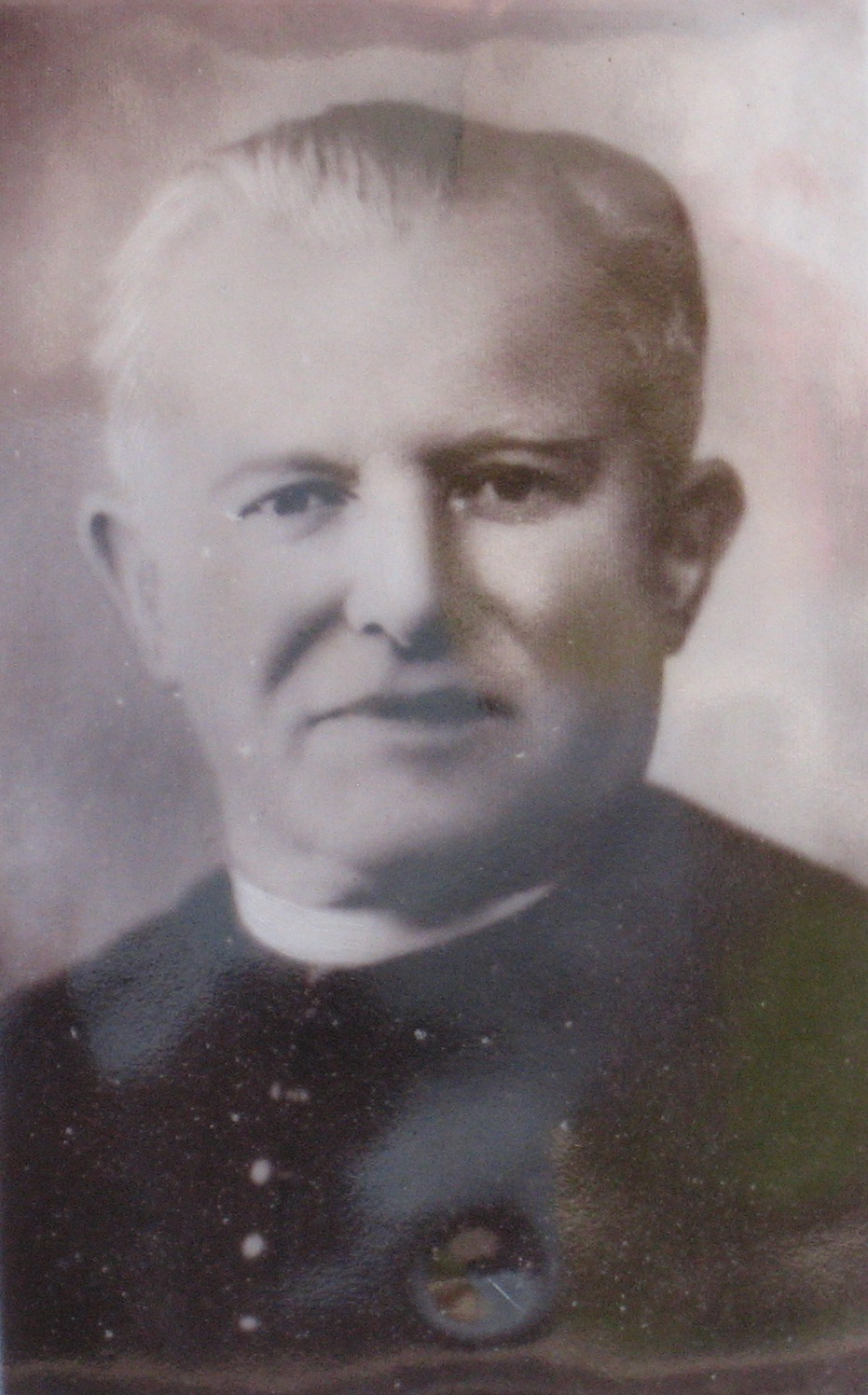
- Don Piero Folli, photo on his tomb in Voldomino
- Church: Roman Catholic Church

Personal details
- Born: 18 September 1881 Premeno, Italy
- Died: 8 March 1948 (aged 66) Voldomino, Luino, Italy

Don Piero Folli (18 September 1881 in Premeno – 8 March 1948 in Voldomino, Luino) was an Italian antifascist parish priest.

== Biography ==
Since the years in seminary he shows his opening and sensitivity to social and political problems, sympathizing with workers fights of 1898.

In open reaction against any abuse of power and injustice, declared antifascist, since 1923 he suffers every type of harassment, including the fascist punishment of castor oil.

In 1923 he arrives in Voldomino near Luino, where he often denounces in his sermons the abuses of power and wrongs of fascist dictatorship.

After 8 September 1943 many allied prisoners escaped from concentration camps arrive in the village, young Italian soldiers who failed to report for military service in Italian Social Republic, victims of political persecution (Mauro Scoccimarro, Guido Miglioli, Piero Malvestiti), Jewish sought after. His house, the sacristy, the oratory, the old nursery school of Santa Liberata are literally invaded by hundreds of escaped people who are welcomed, given hospitality, fed, and helped to cross the nearby Swiss border until his arrest on 3 December 1943.

After three months of hard prison in San Vittore, thanks to the intervention of Card. Alfredo Ildefonso Schuster he is freed and confined first in Cesano Boscone, then in Vittuone. After the war he returned to Voldomino and resumed his life as parish priest, dying after three. He is buried in Voldomino cemetery, on his tomb stone it is written that he was given the treasures of «faith science altruism» that made him «dear to God and his people».

A memorial tablet was put on 3 December 1983 on the vault of Piazza Piave in Voldomino.

== The arrest ==
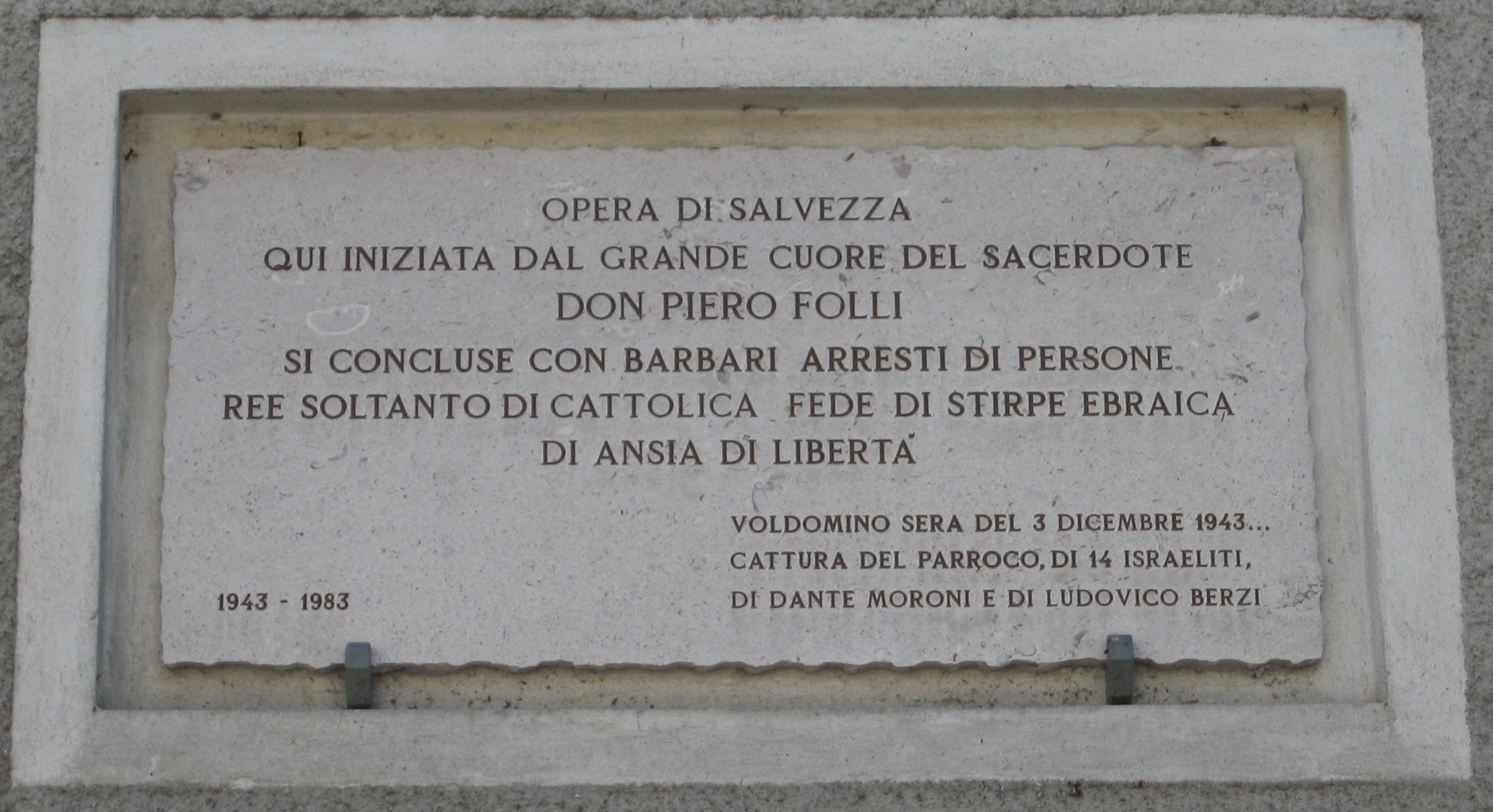
Memorial tablet of don Piero Folli in Voldomino

3 December 1943. Voldomino near Luino.

A nazi-fascist breaks punishment expedition breaks in the rectory and arrests don Piero Folli together with a group of 14 Jewish people sent from Genova archbishop Pietro Boetto, who had been just rejected form the Swiss at the border. Thirty other Jewish people, coming from Saint-Martin-Vésubie near Besançon, had already been saved in three or four trips, accompanied by Don Rotondi, but their names have not been found.

Don Piero, tied to the grate, in spite of the undergone tortures to make him talk, still has the strength to react strongly when he sees Jewish women and children hit and loaded on a truck. To make him silent they turn his head backwards against the grate, seizing him by his hair and pulling out a lock. Only one girl named Myriam Pirani succeeds in hiding and returning to Genova to give the alarm to Massimo Teglio of DELASEM, who organized the escape of the Jews to Switzerland. We don't know where the girl ended to.

1943–44. San Vittore. Don Folli succeeds in keeping silent and doesn't reveal the names of the people who helped him in his activity, he is beaten and tortured but he doesn't talk. One day, during the hour of air he sees a line of prisoners who is being deported to Germany. As he is unable to send his word of support he doesn't hesitate to bless them. The fascist guard who sees him hits him hard with the butt of his gun and throws him to the ground.

== See also ==
- Catholic Church in Italy

== Bibliography ==
- G.De Antonellis (care of), Cattolici ambrosiani per la libertà, Milano, Ned, 1995, pp. 98–102
- Don G.Barbareschi (care of), Memorie di sacerdoti ribelli per amore, Milano, Centro di Documentazione e Studi Religiosi, 1986, pp. 162–166
- Travalia, Studi su Luino e gli immediati dintorni, edito a cura della biblioteca civica di Luino, aprile 1975
- Rosa Paini, Sentieri della speranza, Xenia editrice, Milano, 1988
- Letter to cardinal Schuster from Don Enrico Longoni, 4 December 1943
- Mario E. Macciò, Genova e "ha Shoah" Salvati dalla Chiesa, Il Cittadino, Genova, 2006
- Documentation conserved by the Archivio storico della Diocesi di Milano – sezione Resistenza
- Vittoria Folli, Storia e vita ambrosiana, maggio 1982, pp. 233–234
- Prealpina, 3 December 1981, Pitigrilli braccato dai fascisti trovò a Luino la via dell'espatrio
- Luce, Luino, 27 November 1983, Una sera di 40 anni fa in "Santa Liberata", la spedizione punitiva di quel drammatico 3 December 1943
- Aldo Mongodi, A San Vittore 37 anni fa il prete dei perseguitati ed il fabbro comunista, personaggi illustri, intere famiglie di ebrei ed ex prigionieri di guerra passarono dalla canonica di un coraggioso prete di Voldomino, Avvenire, 5 December 1980
- Dino Segre, Mosè e il cav. Levi, Milano, 1948
