= Tronzano Lago Maggiore =

- Comune
- Comune di Tronzano Lago Maggiore
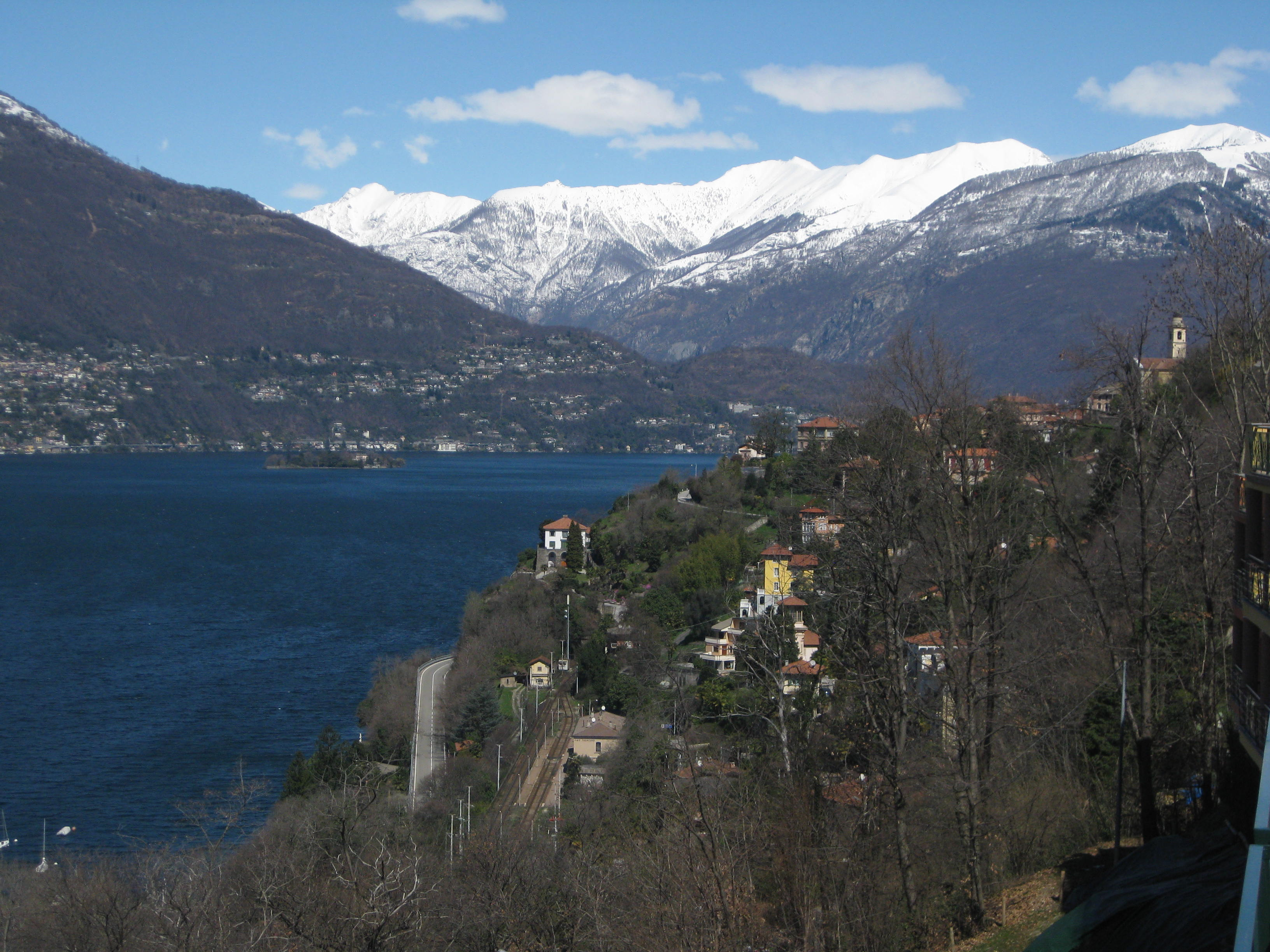

- Coat of arms

- Location within Italy Location within Lombardy
- Coordinates: 46°5′N 8°44′E
- Country: Italy
- Region: Lombardy
- Province: Varese (VA)
- Frazioni: Bassano, la Costa, la Mora, Riva, Lanterna, Poggio, il Bersagliere, Ronco Scigolino, Monti di Bassano, Monte Borgna, la Crocetta, Santa Maria di Lourdes, Porto

Government
  - Mayor: Roberto Stangalini

Area
  - Total: 11.0 km^{2} (4.2 sq mi)
- Elevation: 342 m (1,122 ft)

Population (Dec. 2004)
  - Total: 270
  - Density: 25/km^{2} (64/sq mi)
- Demonym: Tronzanesi
- Time zone: UTC+1 (CET)
  - Summer (DST): UTC+2 (CEST)
- Postal code: 21010
- Dialing code: 0332

Tronzano Lago Maggiore (Lombard: Tronscian, Tronzan, all names from Latin Tronsianum) is a comune (municipality) in the Province of Varese in the Italian region Lombardy, located about 80 km (50 mi) northwest of Milan and about 30 km (19 mi) north of Varese, on the border with Switzerland.

Tronzano Lago Maggiore borders the following municipalities: Brissago (Switzerland), Cannobio, Maccagno con Pino e Veddasca.

== Demographic evolution ==
Historical population

Year	Pop.	±%
1861	519	—
1871	449	−13.5%
1881	388	−13.6%
1901	361	−7.0%
1911	354	−1.9%

Year	Pop.	±%
1921	340	−4.0%
1931	351	+3.2%
1936	310	−11.7%
1951	279	−10.0%
1961	269	−3.6%

Year	Pop.	±%
1971	305	+13.4%
1981	340	+11.5%
1991	302	−11.2%
2001	257	−14.9%

Source: Data from ISTAT
