= Maccagno =

- Comune
- Comune di Maccagno
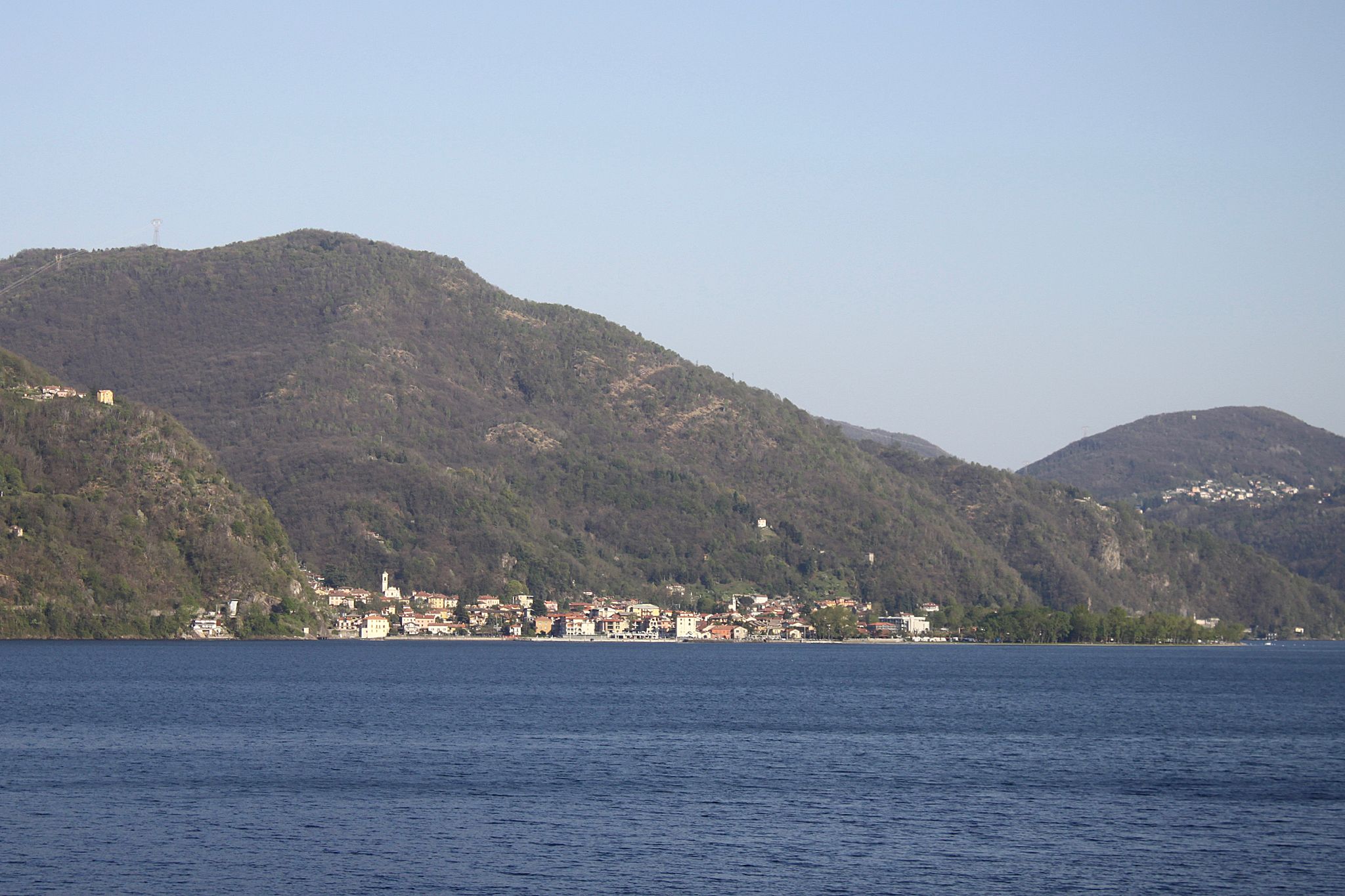

- Coat of arms

- Location within Italy Location within Lombardy
- Coordinates: 46°3′N 8°44′E
- Country: Italy
- Region: Lombardy
- Province: Varese (VA)
- Frazioni: Alpe Dei, Alpe Inent, Bosco Nassa, Campagnano, Case Venere, Caviggia, Garabiolo, Lago Delio, Monte Borgna, Musignano, Orascio, Sarangio, Entiglio, Ronco delle Monache, Ronco Valgrande, San Rocco, Sasso della Nonna, Veddo

Government
  - Mayor: Fabio Passera

Area
  - Total: 17.0 km^{2} (6.6 sq mi)
- Elevation: 210 m (690 ft)

Population (Dec. 2004)
  - Total: 2,028
  - Density: 119/km^{2} (309/sq mi)
- Demonym: Maccagnesi
- Time zone: UTC+1 (CET)
  - Summer (DST): UTC+2 (CEST)
- Postal code: 21010
- Dialing code: 0332
- Website: Official website

Maccagno was a comune (municipality) of 2,000 inhabitants located in the province of Varese in the Italian region Lombardy, located in the Val Veddasca about 70 km northwest of Milan and about 25 km northwest of Varese.

On 1 January 2014, the municipalities of Maccagno, Pino sulla Sponda del Lago Maggiore and Veddasca merged into the municipality of Maccagno con Pino e Veddasca.

== History ==
The Southern part of the Town became an imperial Fief by Emperor Otto during the Middle Ages. In 1622, Giacomo III Mandelli - count of Southern Maccagno - got from the emperor Ferdinand II of Habsburg the privilege to mint coins in its fief.

== Geography ==
Maccagno is located by the lake shore of the Lake Maggiore, on the east side. Not far from the town center there is a cliff that is used for rock climbing activities. The cliff is called "Il Cinzanino" and it is managed by the Club Alpino Italiano, departement of Luino.

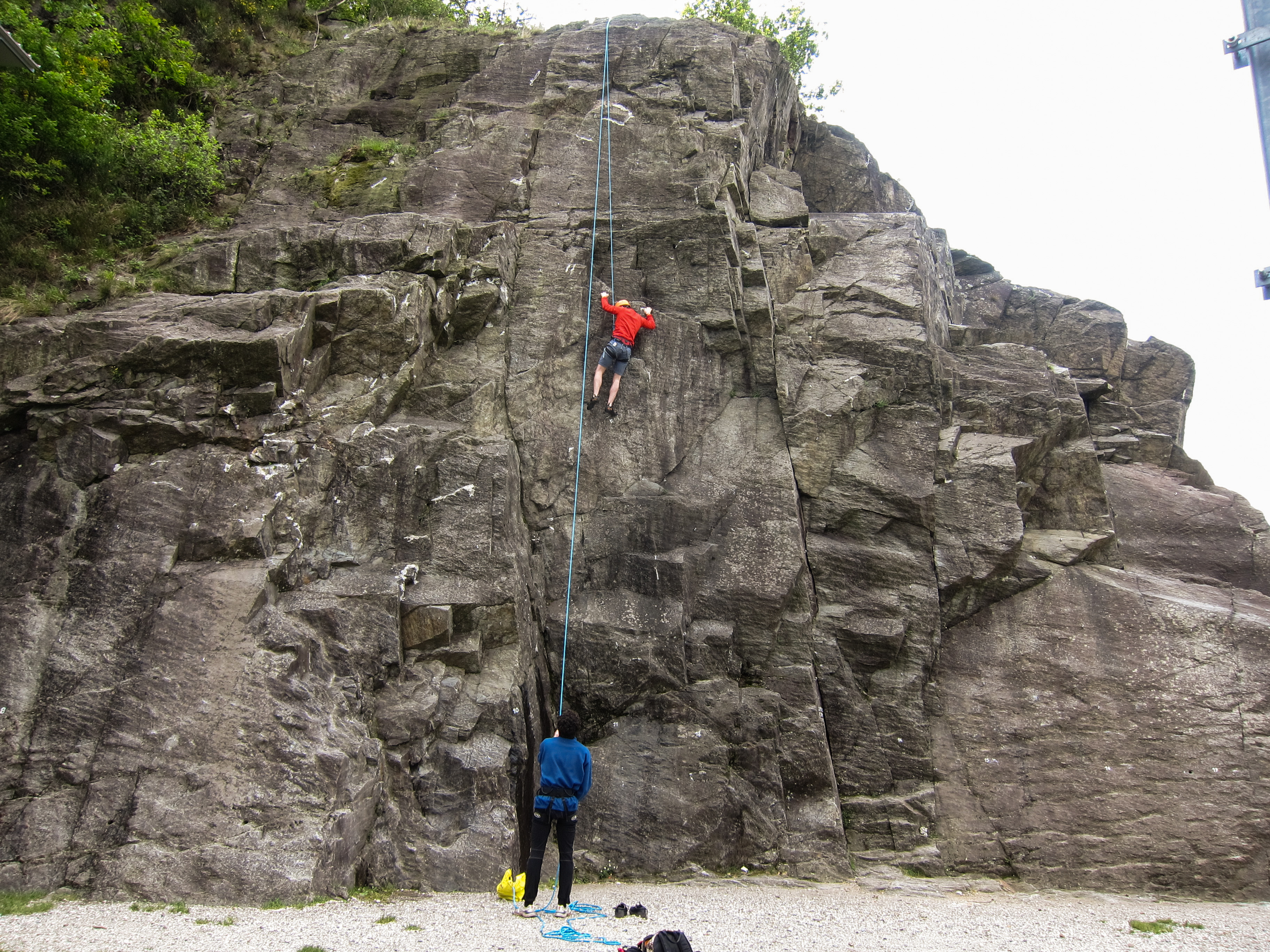
Rock climbing in Maccagno

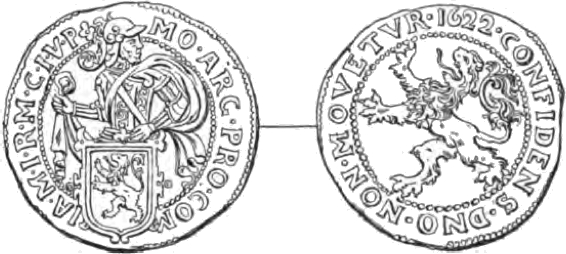
a Thaler of Maccagno of 1622

== Bibliography ==
- Luca Gianazza, La zecca di Maccagno Inferiore e le sue monete, Libraio Alberti Editore, Verbania-Intra, 2003, ISBN 978-88-72451-21-2.
