= Pino sulla Sponda del Lago Maggiore =

- Comune
- Comune di Pino sulla Sponda del Lago Maggiore

- Location within Italy Location within Lombardy
- Coordinates: 46°6′6″N 8°44′23″E
- Country: Italy
- Region: Lombardy
- Province: Varese (VA)
- Frazioni: Zenna, Monti di Pino, Alpe Cortiggia, Piano Volpera, Bersona, Mulinaccio, Alpe Tabia, Piano della Rogna, Alpe di Piero

Area
  - Total: 7.1 km^{2} (2.7 sq mi)
- Elevation: 289 m (948 ft)

Population (Dec. 2004)
  - Total: 251
  - Density: 35/km^{2} (92/sq mi)
- Demonym: Pinesi
- Time zone: UTC+1 (CET)
  - Summer (DST): UTC+2 (CEST)
- Postal code: 21010
- Dialing code: 0332

Pino sulla Sponda del Lago Maggiore (lit. 'Pino on the shore of Lake Maggiore'; Pin in Varesino dialect) is a former municipality of Italy, now frazione of the municipality of Maccagno con Pino e Veddasca in the Province of Varese.

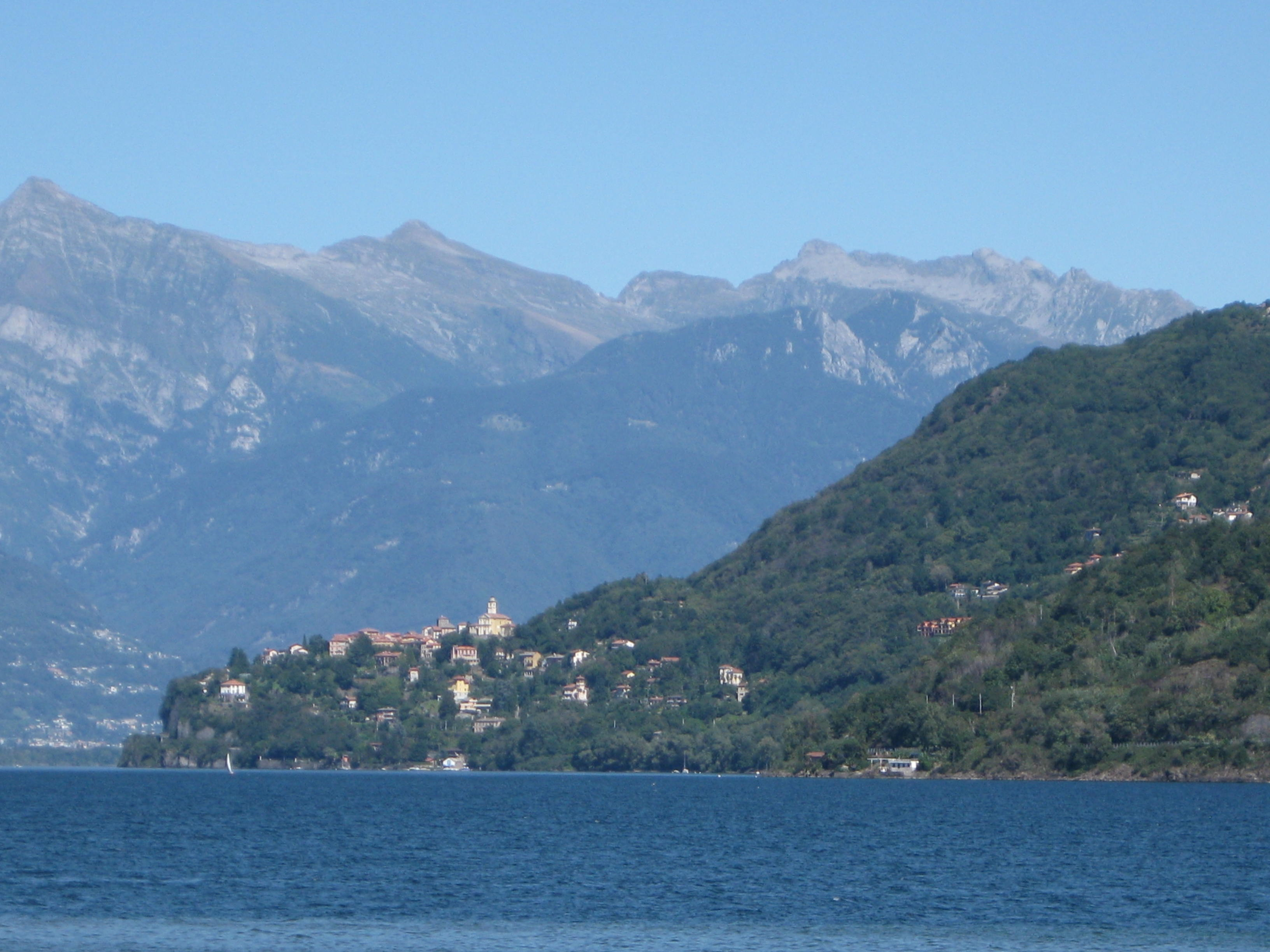
Pino sulla Sponda del Lago Maggiore as seen from the western side of the lake

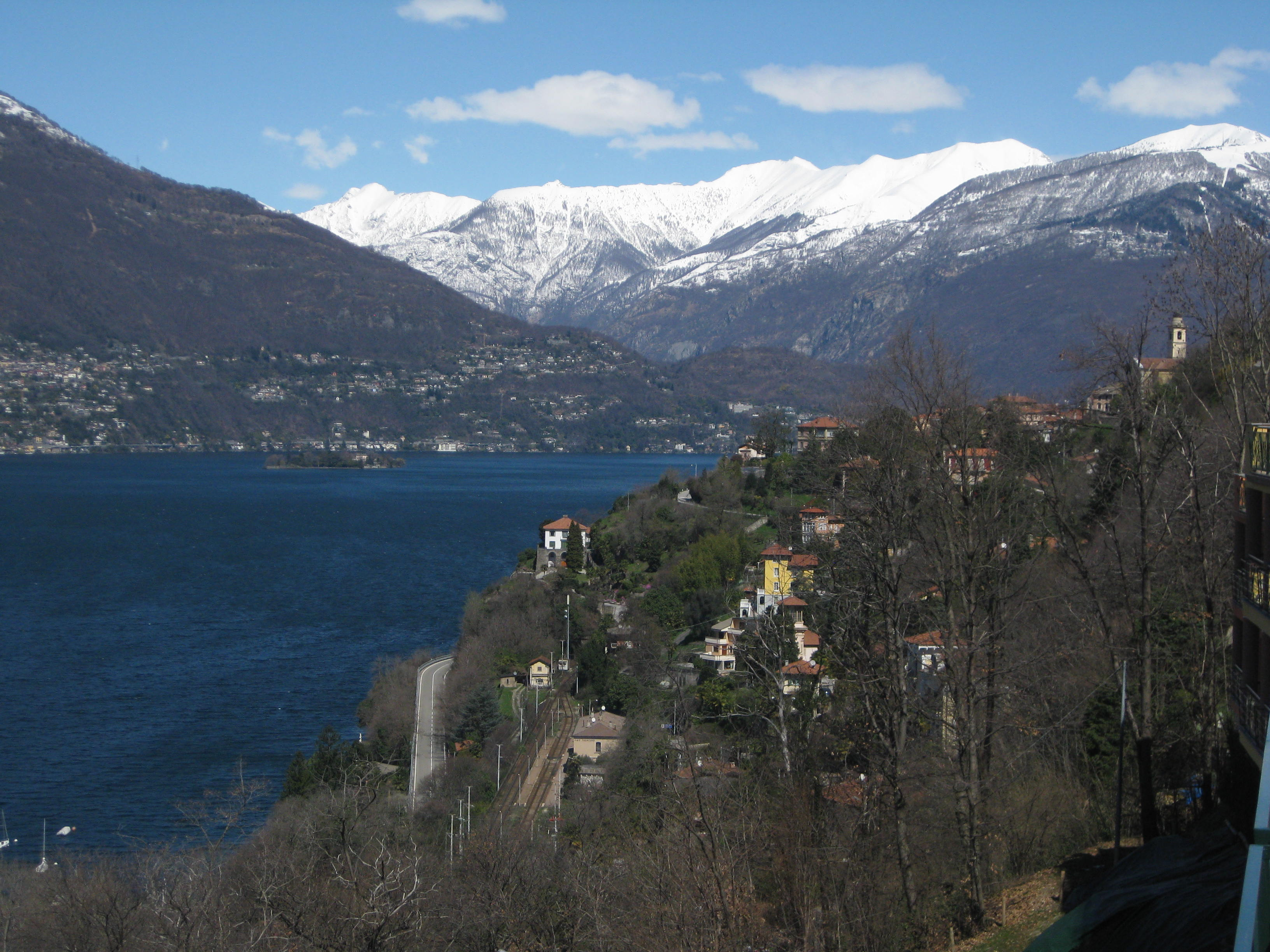
View to the north, Pino sulla Sponda del Lago Maggiore and train station Pino-Tronzano

It held the status of comune until 2014 when it was merged with Maccagno and Veddasca to form the new municipality.

It lies about located about 110 km (68 mi) northwest of Milan and about 70 km (43 mi) northwest of Varese, on the border with Switzerland.

Until its suppression, Pino sulla Sponda del Lago Maggiore held along with San Valentino in Abruzzo Citeriore, the record of Italian comune with the longest name (30 letters).

== Demographic evolution ==
Historical population

Year	Pop.	±%
1861	329	—
1871	292	−11.2%
1881	236	−19.2%
1901	289	+22.5%
1911	285	−1.4%

Year	Pop.	±%
1921	250	−12.3%
1931	240	−4.0%
1936	267	+11.3%
1951	265	−0.7%
1961	295	+11.3%

Year	Pop.	±%
1971	363	+23.1%
1981	304	−16.3%
1991	290	−4.6%
2001	247	−14.8%

Source: Data from ISTAT
