= Maccagno con Pino e Veddasca =

Maccagno con Pino e Veddasca Macagn cont Pin e Vedasca (Lombard)
- Comune
- Comune di Maccagno con Pino e Veddasca
- Location within Italy Location within Lombardy
- Coordinates: 46°04′30″N 8°46′15″E
- Country: Italy
- Region: Lombardy
- Province: Province of Varese (VA)
- Founded: 4 February 2014
- Frazioni: Armio, Biegno, Cadero, Campagnano, Caviggia, Entiglio, Garabiolo, Graglio, Lozzo, Maccagno (municipal seat), Monte Venere, Musignano, Monti di Pino, Orascio, Pianca, Piantonazzo, Pino sulla Sponda del Lago Maggiore, Ronchi, Sarangio, Veddo, Zenna.

Government
  - Mayor: Fabio Passera

Area
  - Total: 30.06 km^{2} (11.61 sq mi)
- Elevation ISTAT: 210 m (690 ft)

Population (31-3-2018)ISTAT
  - Total: 2,616
  - Density: 87.03/km^{2} (225.4/sq mi)
- Time zone: UTC+1 (CET)
  - Summer (DST): UTC+2 (CEST)
- Postal code: 21061
- Dialing code: 0332
- ISTAT code: 012142

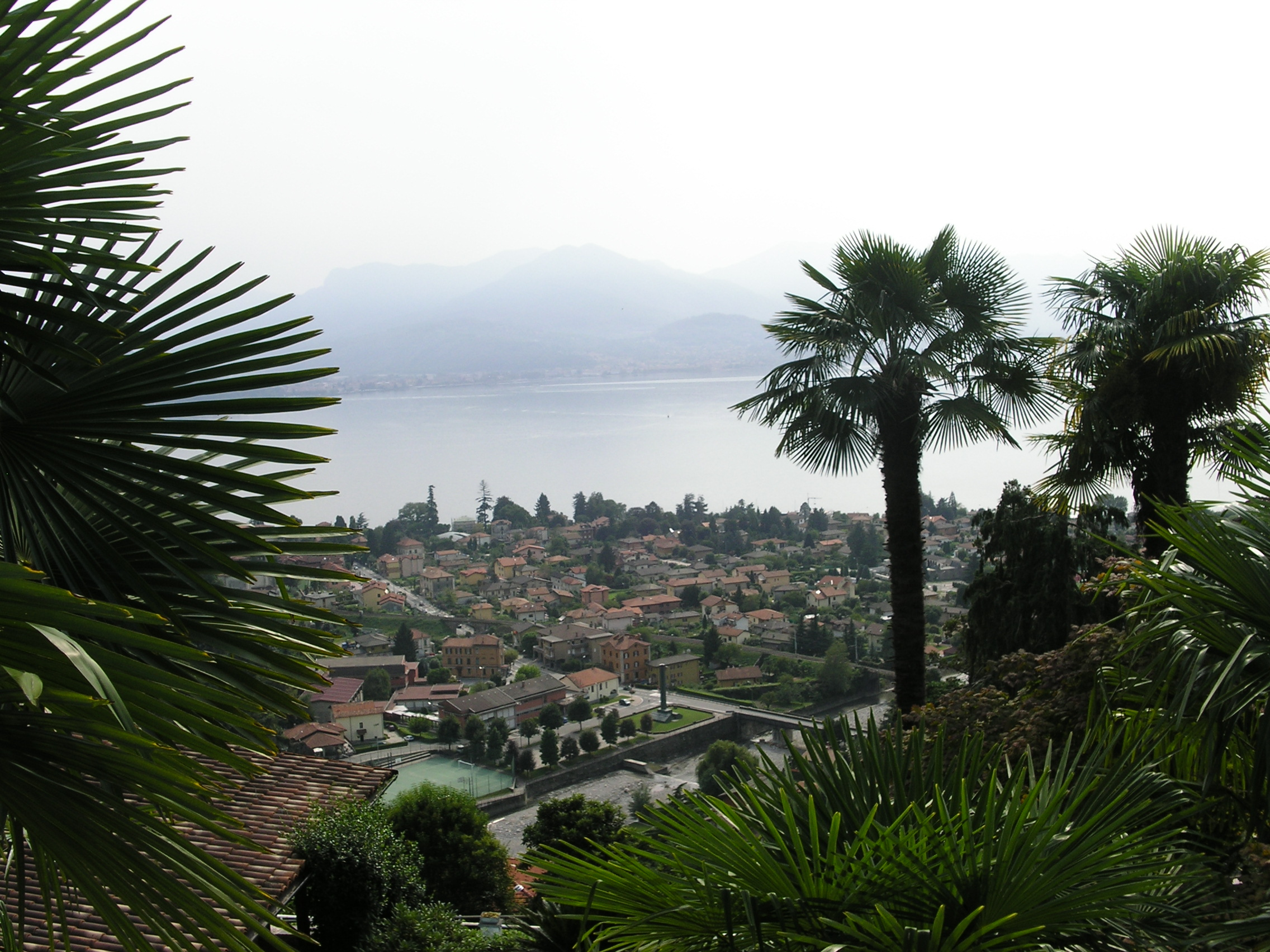
Maccagno con Pino e Veddasca panorama, Italy

Maccagno con Pino e Veddasca (Ticinese: Macagn cont Pin e Vedasca) is a comune in the province of Varese, in Lombardy, Italy, that was formed on 25 May 2014 from fusion of the communes of Maccagno, Pino sulla Sponda del Lago Maggiore and Veddasca.

A referendum to create this comune was held on 1 December 2013. The referendum was passed with 77% yes and 33% no votes.

Maccagno con Pino e Veddasca borders the following municipalities: Brissago (Switzerland), Cannobio (VB), Curiglia con Monteviasco, Dumenza, Gambarogno (Switzerland), Luino, Ronco sopra Ascona (Switzerland), Tronzano Lago Maggiore. Its neighborhood of Maccagno Imperiale is one of I Borghi più belli d'Italia ("The most beautiful villages of Italy").
