= Luino =

- Comune
- Comune di Luino
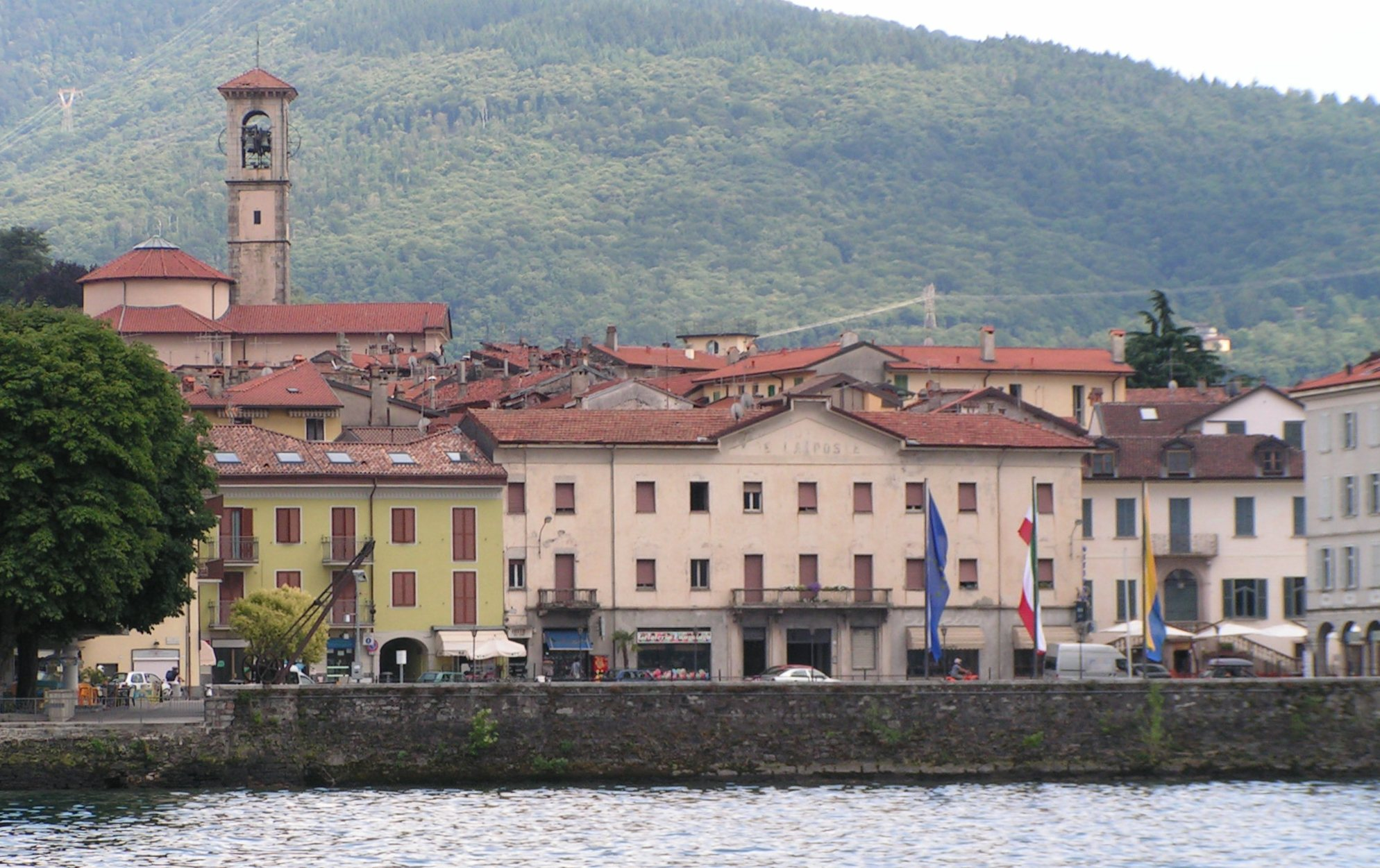
- Panorama of Luino

- Location within Italy Location within Lombardy
- Coordinates: 46°00′N 08°45′E
- Country: Italy
- Region: Lombardy
- Province: Varese (VA)
- Frazioni: Baggiolina, Biviglione, Bonga, Casa Colombaro, Casa Demenech, Casa Donato, Casa Ferrario, Casa Ferrattina, Casa Pozzi, Cascina Pastore, Case Mirabello, Colmegna, Creva, Fornasette, Girasole, Il Gaggio, Il Valdo, La Brughiera, La Speranza, Longhirolo, Molino, Monte Bedea, Motte, Pezza, Pezzalunga, Pezze, Pianazzo, Poppino, Roggiolo, Ronchi, San Pietro, Tecco, Torretta, Trebedora, Vignone, Voldomino

Government
  - Mayor: Enrico Bianchi (since September 2021)

Area
  - Total: 20.95 km^{2} (8.09 sq mi)
- Elevation: 202 m (663 ft)

Population (31 January 2009)
  - Total: 14,324
  - Density: 683.7/km^{2} (1,771/sq mi)
- Demonym: Luinesi
- Time zone: UTC+1 (CET)
  - Summer (DST): UTC+2 (CEST)
- Postal code: 21016
- Dialing code: 0332
- Website: Official website

Luino (Western Lombard: Lüin) is a small town and comune near the border with Switzerland on the eastern shore of Lake Maggiore, in the province of Varese, in the Italian region of Lombardy.

Luino received the honorary title of city with a presidential decree in 1969.

Luino is well known for its weekly market, currently held on Wednesdays, which is purportedly one of the largest of its kind in Europe. It is also a popular destination for tourists, especially from Switzerland, Germany and the Netherlands.

== History ==
Although a Roman necropolis has been excavated in the area, Luino is mentioned by documents only in 1169 AD, as Luvino. In the Middle Ages it was contested between powerful families from Como and Milan, but was able to maintain its status as a free commune. As part of the Duchy of Milan, it was acquired by Spain in the early 16th century and, in 1541, king Charles V gave it right to hold a market in alternance with Maccagno, who had been enjoying it alone so far. The concession was confirmed in 1786.

Here in 1848 Italian patriots from Piedmont rose against the Austrian occupation. Giuseppe Garibaldi fought here against the Austrians, and Luino later was the first city in Italy to erect a monument to him (1867).

The area of Luino underwent a high industrialization process, starting from the late 19th century, which caused significant ecological damage to the eponymous Lake.

== Transport ==
The town's railway station, located on the Oleggio–Pino line, is an important border stop, especially for freight trains to the Gotthard railway.

Passenger traffic is served by the line S30 of the Ticino railway network, operated by the international company TiLo, and by the regional trains to Gallarate, operated by the Lombard railway company Trenord.

To arrive to the small town there're many busses even from Switzerland starting from Ponte Tresa's train station near the customs.

Luino is also served by a regular boat service that takes passengers from Luino to a number of other towns and villages around Lake Maggiore.

== Economy ==
By the end of the 19th century, Luino was a heavily industrialised town; the textiles industry being particularly strong here, due to the many water courses which could be used to power the machinery and many textile factories were set up in the local area by Swiss industrialists. Although some shadows of this past trade do remain in the names of local streets and villas (Villa Hussy, via Stehli in the neighbouring Germignaga), the activity in this sector has now diminished considerably.

Many local residents travel every day to work in Switzerland. These so-called frontalieri (i.e. 'borderers') make Luino and neighbouring towns and villages dormitory towns to some extent.

== Notable people ==
Two notable figures of 20th century Italian literature, Piero Chiara and Vittorio Sereni, were born in Luino.

The Nobel Prize for Literature–winning playwright Dario Fo also spent part of his youth here and in the nearby Porto Valtravaglia.

The antifascist catholic priest Piero Folli was parish priest in Voldomino, a part of Luino, from 1923 to 1948, and was arrested there by the fascists on 3 December 1943 for having helped a group of Jews to escape to Switzerland.

== International relations ==
=== Twin towns — Sister cities ===
Luino is twinned with:

- Sanary-sur-Mer, France, since 2001
