= Luino–Oleggio railway =

Railway line in Italy

Overview
- Status: in use
- Owner: Rete Ferroviaria Italiana
- Locale: Lombardy and Piedmont, Italy
- Termini: Luino; Oleggio

Service
- Operator(s): TiLo, Trenitalia, Trenord

History
- Opened: 4 December 1882

Technical
- Line length: 51 km (32 mi)
- Number of tracks: 1
- Track gauge: 1,435 mm (4 ft 8 1/2 in) standard gauge
- Electrification: 3 kV DC

Luino–Oleggio railway is a railway line in Lombardy, Italy.

The railway line was opened on 4 December 1882, in order to provide a second access to the Gotthard railway.

The Novara–Laveno segment was closed to passenger traffic from 12 December 2013. A replacement bus now only serves the section between Sesto Calende and Laveno.

== See also ==
- List of railway lines in Italy
