= Luino railway station =

Railway station in Italy

Luino
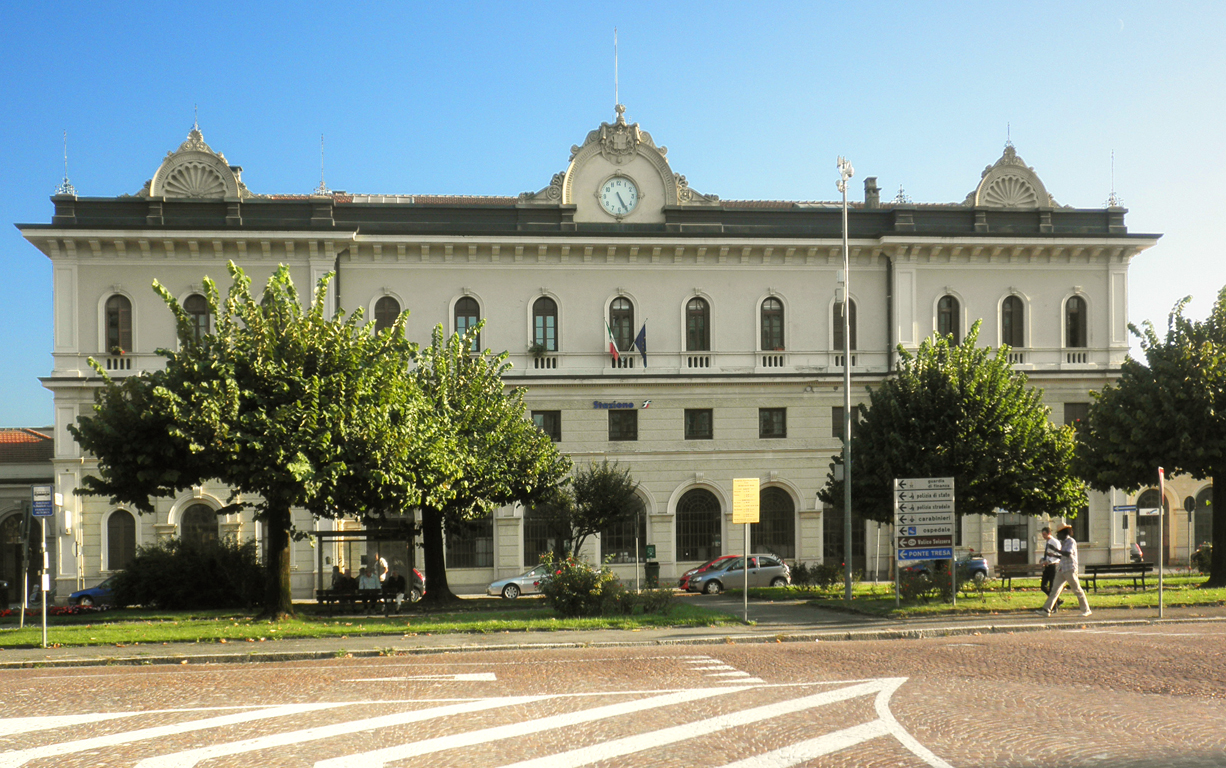
- The station building in 2010

General information
- Location: Piazza Marconi; Luino, Varese, Lombardy; Italy
- Coordinates: 45°59′49″N 8°44′14″E
- Elevation: 204 m (669 ft)
- Operator: Rete Ferroviaria Italiana
- Lines: Cadenazzo–Luino line; Luino–Milan line; Luino–Oleggio line
- Distance: 50.7 km (31.5 mi) from Oleggio
- Train operators: Treni Regionali Ticino Lombardia; Trenord
- Connections: CTPI buses

Other information
- Classification: silver

History
- Opened: 4 December 1882
- Electrified: 11 June 1960 (Swiss part)

Services
Preceding station	Trenord	Following station
Terminus	R21	Porto Valtravaglia towards Milano Porta Garibaldi
Preceding station	TiLo	Following station
Colmegna towards Cadenazzo	S30	Porto Valtravaglia towards Gallarate
Location

Luino railway station (Italian: Stazione di Luino) is a border railway station in Italy. It divides the Swiss network (line to Cadenazzo) with the Italian one (line to Milan and line to Oleggio).

Luino is a frontier station between the Italian network, managed by Rete Ferroviaria Italiana, and the Swiss network, managed by Swiss Federal Railways.

== Services ==
As of the December 2021 timetable change, the following services stop at Luino:

- Regionale: regular service to Gallarate and rush-hour service to Milano Porta Garibaldi.
- S30: service every two hours to Cadenazzo and rush-hour service to Gallarate.
