= Consorzio Trasporti Pubblici Insubria =

CTPI
- Company type: società consortile a responsabilità limitata
- Founded: Varese, Italy 2002
- Headquarters: Varese, Italy
- Area served: Province of Varese
- Services: Bus lines operation
- Website: www.ctpi.it

Consorzio Trasporti Pubblici Insubria, better known as CTPI, is a mixed consortium society (Società consortile mista) of public transport that manages the urban and suburban transport of Varese, Italy.
