= Gallarate railway station =

Railway station in Italy

Gallarate
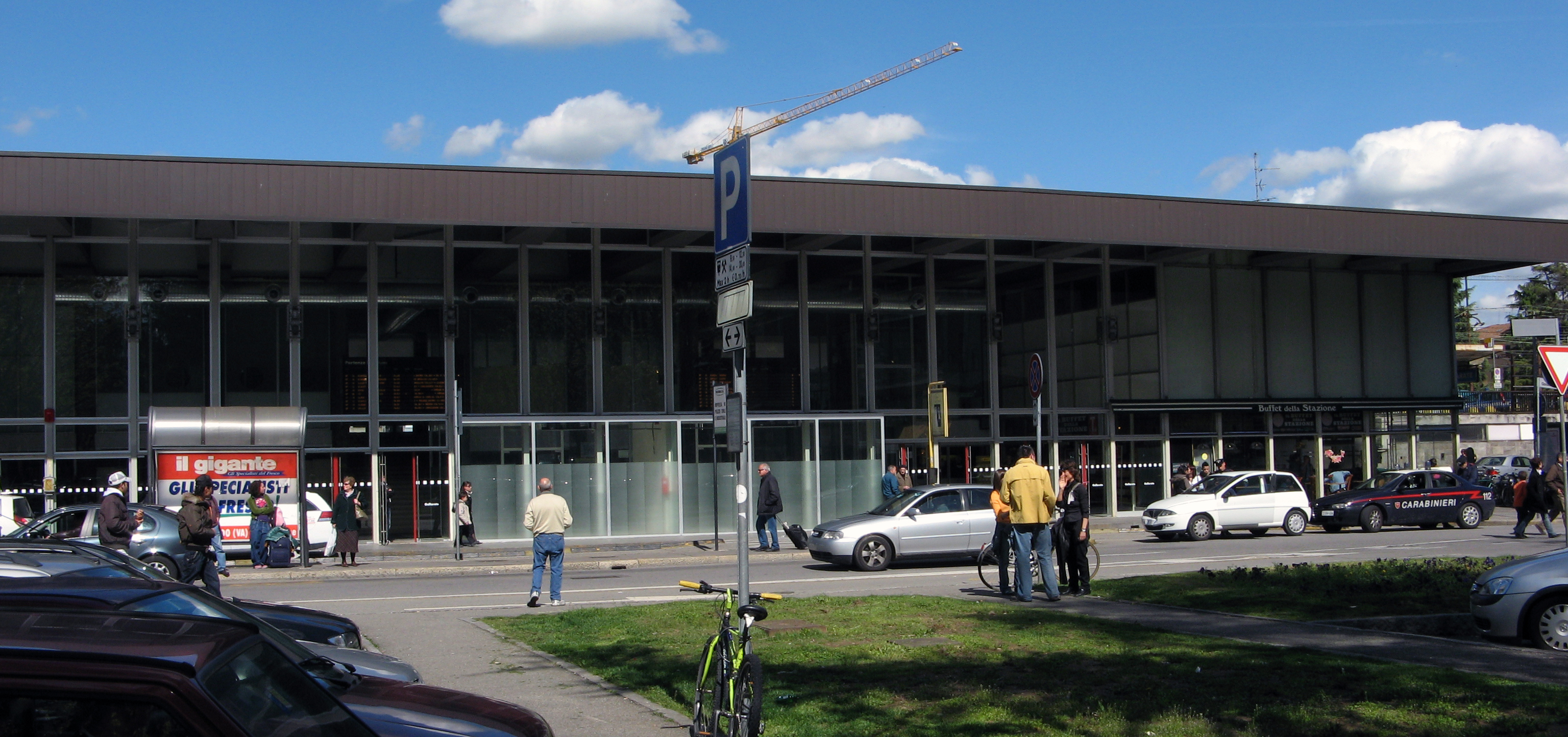
- The station in 2008

General information
- Location: Piazza Giovanni XXIII; Gallarate, Varese, Lombardy; Italy
- Coordinates: 45°39′35″N 8°47′54″E
- Elevation: 242 m (794 ft)
- Operator: Rete Ferroviaria Italiana; Centostazioni
- Lines: Domodossola–Milan line; Luino–Milan line; Porto Ceresio–Milan line
- Tracks: 8
- Train operators: Treni Regionali Ticino Lombardia; Trenitalia; Trenord
- Connections: Urban and suburban buses

Other information
- Classification: Gold

History
- Opened: 21 June 1873
- Electrified: 14 October 1901

Services
Preceding station	Trenord	Following station
Cavaria–Oggiona–Jerago towards Varese	Line S5 (Milan suburban railway service)	Legnano towards Treviglio
Location

Gallarate railway station (Italian: Stazione di Gallarate) serves the town and comune of Gallarate, in the region of Lombardy, northern Italy. Opened in 1860, it is part of the Domodossola–Milan railway, and is a terminus of two secondary railways, Luino–Milan railway and Porto Ceresio–Milan railway.

The station is currently managed by Rete Ferroviaria Italiana (RFI). However, the commercial area of the passenger building is managed by Centostazioni. Each of these companies is a subsidiary of Ferrovie dello Stato (FS), Italy's state-owned rail company.

Train services are operated by Trenitalia, Trenord and TILO.

== Location ==
Gallarate railway station is situated at Piazza Giovanni XXIII, on the southeastern edge of the city centre.

== History ==
The station was opened on 20 December 1860, together with the Rho–Gallarate section of the Rho–Arona railway.

On 24 July 1865, the next section of the Rho–Arona railway, from Gallarate to Sesto Calende, went into operation. Two months later, on 26 September 1865, Gallarate became a junction station, for the newly opened Gallarate–Varese railway.

On 17 March 1884, another secondary line, the Gallarate–Laveno railway, commenced operations into Gallarate.

== Features ==
The station yard has eight tracks, including five through tracks equipped with platforms:

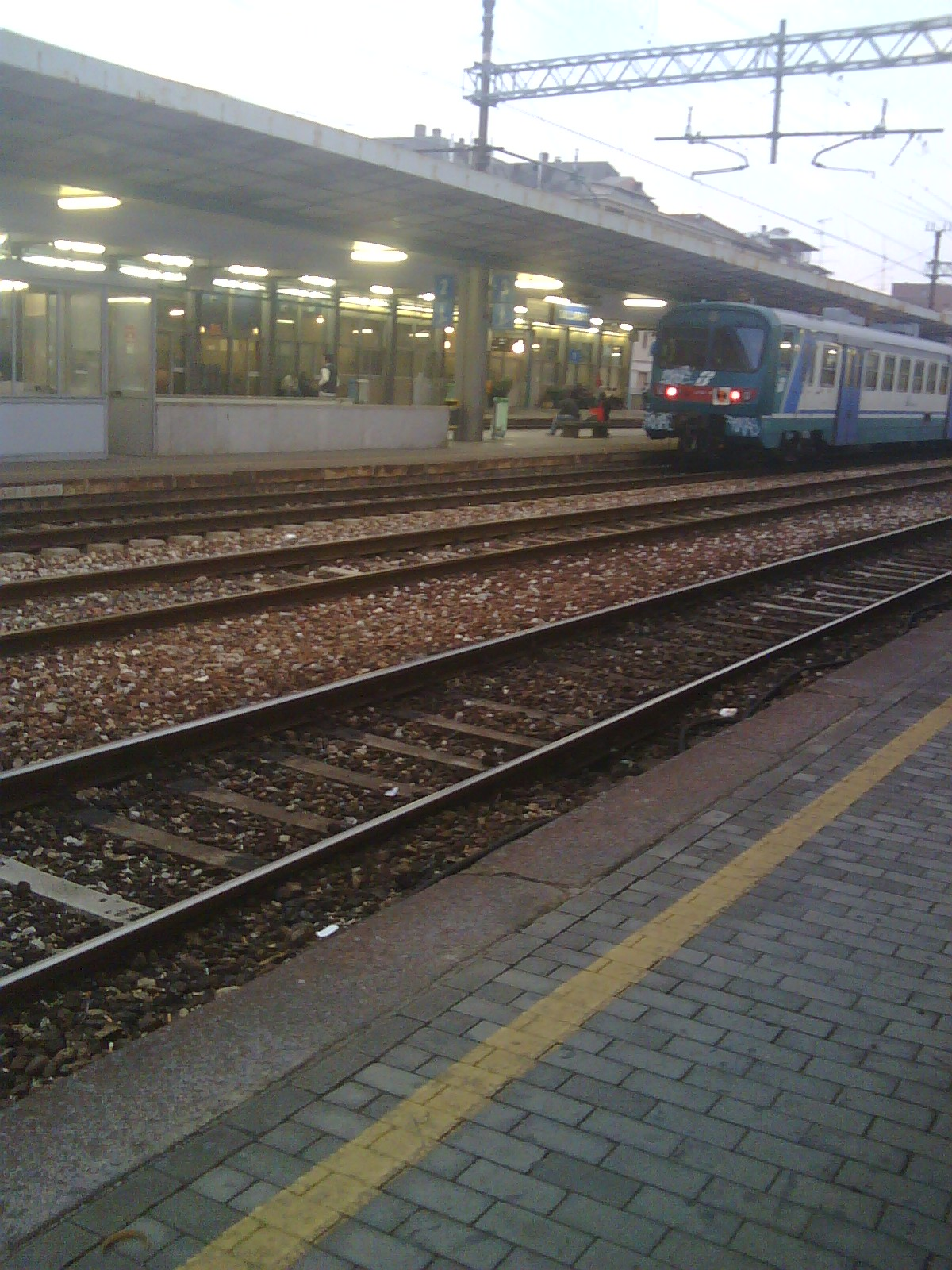
View of the station yard.

- Track 1 is for direct trains to Domodossola, Geneva and Basel.
- Track 2 is for direct trains to Milano Centrale, Milano Porta Garibaldi coming from Domodossola/Luino.
- Track 3 is a through track used for terminating trains from Luino (via Gallarate–Laveno railway).
- Track 4 is a service track.
- Track 5 is used mainly by trains on line S5 of the Milan suburban railway network, and regional trains direct to Varese.
- Track 6 is used by trains on line S5 and regional trains from Varese.
- Tracks 7 and 8 are used by goods trains direct to Hupac's Busto Arsizio Terminal and to Switzerland via Luino or Domodossola.

Just beyond the station, towards Milan, is a goods yard, now abandoned, and a workshop for the maintenance of rolling stock. The workshop has been closed for over ten years, but may eventually reopen.

Adjacent to track 1 is a State Police station, close to the Commissariat.

== Passenger and train movements ==
The station has about 6.6 million passenger movements each year.

The passenger trains calling at the station are mainly regional services and Line S5 Milan suburban services. The station is also served by two pairs of EuroCity trains providing connections between Milan and either Geneva or Basel.

== See also ==
- History of rail transport in Italy
- List of railway stations in Lombardy
- Rail transport in Italy
