= Laveno-Mombello =

- Comune
- Comune di Laveno-Mombello
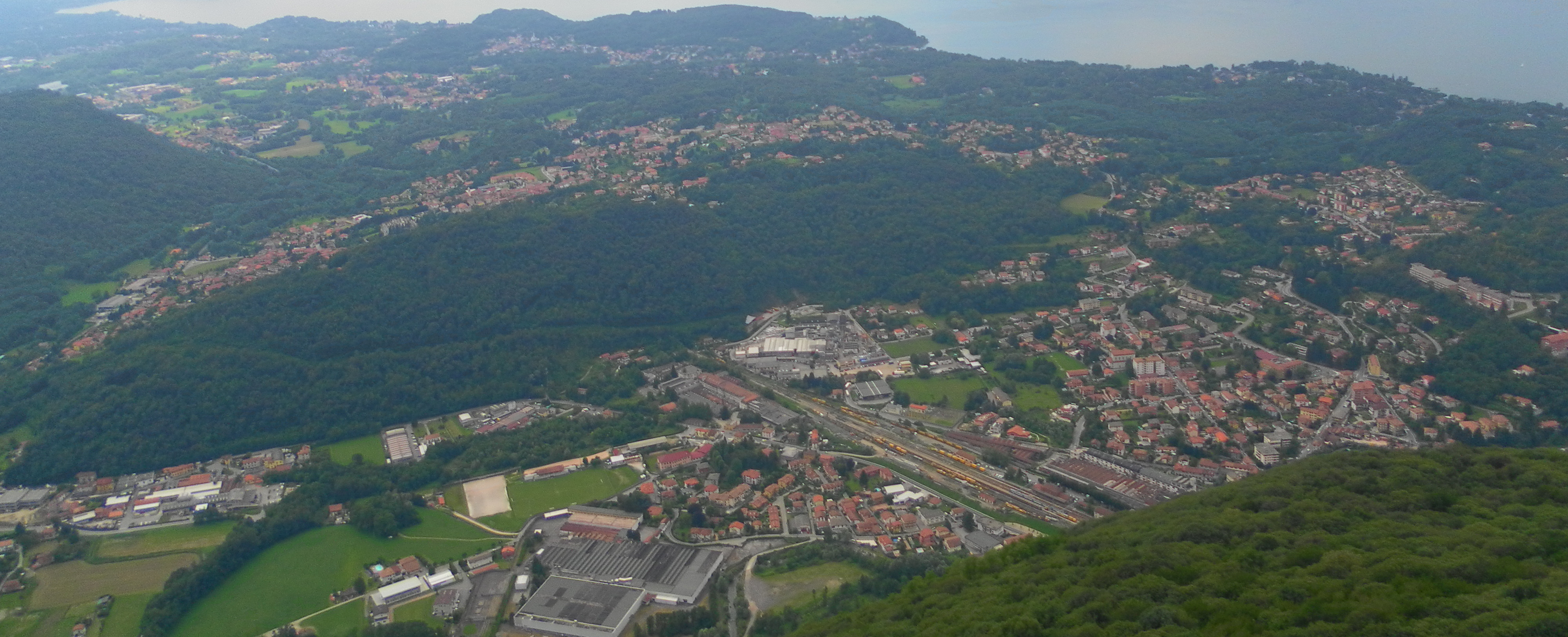

- Location within Italy Location within Lombardy
- Coordinates: 45°54′N 8°37′E
- Country: Italy
- Region: Lombardy
- Province: Province of Varese (VA)

Area
  - Total: 25.9 km^{2} (10.0 sq mi)

Population (December 2004)
  - Total: 8,991
  - Density: 347/km^{2} (899/sq mi)
- Demonym(s): Lavenesi, mombellesi, cerresi
- Time zone: UTC+1 (CET)
  - Summer (DST): UTC+2 (CEST)
- Postal code: 21014
- Dialing code: 0332

Laveno-Mombello is a comune (municipality) in the Province of Varese in the Italian region Lombardy, located about 75 kilometres (47 mi) northwest of Milan and about 25 kilometres (16 mi) northwest of Varese. As of 2024, it had a population of 8,424 and an area of 25.9 square kilometres (10.0 mi^{2}). It sits at the foot of Sasso del Ferro and on the border of the lake maggiore.

== History ==
The earliest evidence of Mombello dates back to primitive settlements, presumably from 5500 to 4500 BC. In 1864, the remains of a Neolithic village built on stilts was discovered in the marshland area known as the "Torbiera". The settlements of Laveno and Cerro are more recent. The first references to Laveno date to Roman times.

Initially dominated by the Lombards and Franks, Laveno and Mombello later became part of the Seprio district. They subsequently came under the feudal control of the Visconti, Sforza, Borromeo, and Besozzi families. After the Spanish domination, Laveno passed under Austrian rule, which continued even after the Napoleonic period.

In May 1859, Laveno Mombello became the scene of significant historical events involving Giuseppe Garibaldi. His Alpine Hunters troops were repelled by Austrian forces around the gulf and on San Michele hill. Evidence of those battles remains in the ossuary tower, the "Fortino" and the San Michele barracks.

The name of Laveno comes from two denominations: the first is from the Latin word "labes", which means "landslide"; the second denomination is from the Roman general Titus Labienus, that gives his name to the port (Portus Labienus) and subsequently to the surrounding area. The radix of the name is actually just in the main road of the town, via Labiena. Titus Labienus is considered responsible for naming Mombello too, after a battle against the Gauls ("mons belli" means "war hill"). A different interpretation says that the meaning is "monte bello", which is "beautiful hill".

The municipality was formed in 1927 to encompass the previously separate centres of Laveno, Mombello and Cerro. The municipality also includes smaller settlements such as Ceresolo and Ponte, as well as panoramic hillside localities including Cascine, Monteggia, Montecristo and Brena, and Casere.

Laveno-Mombello borders the following municipalities: Caravate, Castelveccana, Cittiglio, Ghiffa, Leggiuno, Sangiano. Stresa and Verbania are in front of the town across the lake.

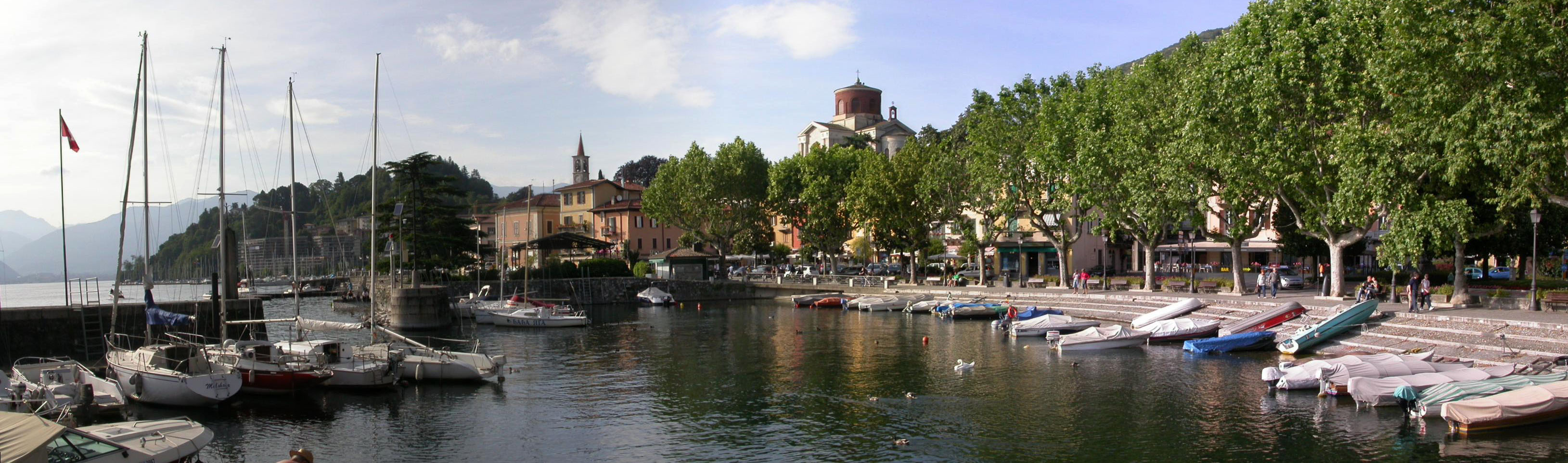
The harbour at Laveno Mombello

== Economic Activity ==
The town became an important trade center around 1800, when besides being a community of fishermen and farmers, it started hosting a major grain exchange market, serving Milan, Canton Ticino, and the lakeside towns. A modern reminder of this trading tradition is its weekly Tuesday market, which continues that legacy in a different form.

In the 19th century, Laveno Mombello was home to important ceramic industries with the foundations of the Laveno ceramic era laid in 1856 and concluded in 1997 (after 141 years) when the last of the Laveno industrial ceramic companies, the Cooperativa Ceramiche Industriali, closed.

== Heritage ==
- International Museum of Ceramic Design: A collection founded in 1971 and housed in the Palazzo Perabò.
- Oratory of Santa Maria di Corte: A small church situated in Mombello with a 16th-century fresco.

== Transport ==
Laveno-Mombello is served by Laveno-Mombello railway station, managed by Rete Ferroviaria Italiana, and by Laveno-Mombello Nord railway station, managed by Ferrovienord. A car ferry links the town with Intra (Verbania) on the western side of Lago Maggiore.

In 1963, Laveno-Mombello inaugurated its cable car system, connecting in about 15 minutes visitors from the center of Laveno to the summit area of Mount Sasso del Ferro, reaching the locality commonly referred as “Poggio Sant’Elsa.”

From 1965 to 1980 , a small ski area existed on Mount Sasso del Ferro, consisting of a rope tow, a snow cannon and a ski lift. The ski lift started from Poggio Sant’Elsa at an altitude of 1,000 meters and reached the summit of Mount Sasso del Ferro at 1,062 meters above sea level. The ski resort closed in the early 1980s, due to insufficient snowfall and the low altitude.

== Demographic evolution ==
Historical population

Year	Pop.	±%
1861	3,136	—
1871	3,368	+7.4%
1881	3,843	+14.1%
1901	4,277	+11.3%
1911	5,050	+18.1%

Year	Pop.	±%
1921	5,133	+1.6%
1931	5,798	+13.0%
1936	5,954	+2.7%
1951	6,749	+13.4%
1961	7,399	+9.6%

Year	Pop.	±%
1971	8,695	+17.5%
1981	9,037	+3.9%
1991	8,883	−1.7%
2001	8,736	−1.7%
2011	8,905	+1.9%

Source: Data from ISTAT
