= Caravate =

- Comune
- Comune di Caravate
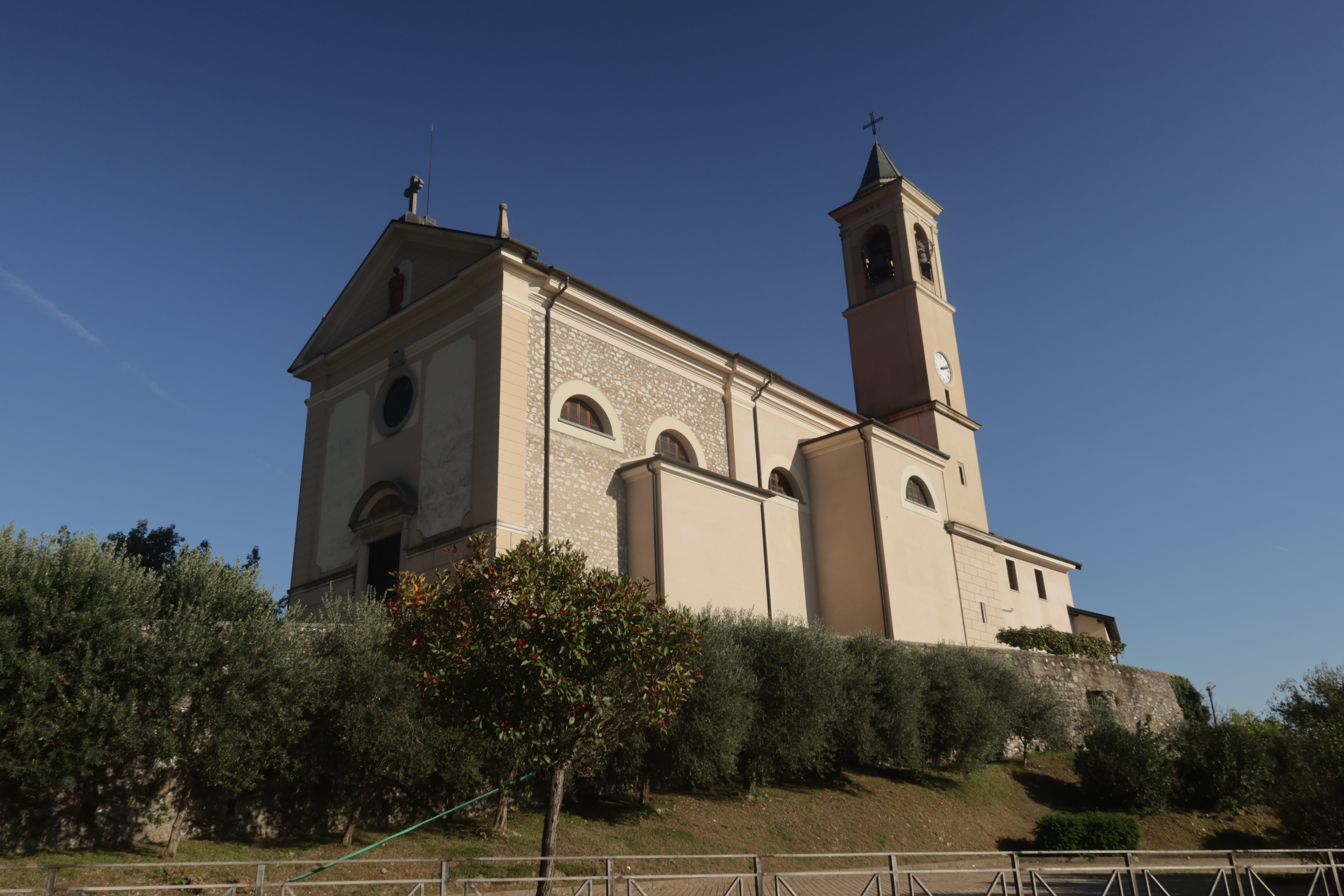
- Church of San Giovanni Battista and San Maurizio

- Location within Italy Location within Lombardy
- Coordinates: 45°53′N 8°39′E
- Country: Italy
- Region: Lombardy
- Province: Province of Varese (VA)
- Frazioni: Stallazzo, San Clemente, Fornazze, Canton d'Oro, Canton Chiedo, Cadè, Castello, Cà Stecco, Pozzei, Monte San Giano, Santa Maria del Sasso, Virolo, Fornace Farsani

Government
  - Mayor: Nicola Tardugno

Area
  - Total: 5.1 km^{2} (2.0 sq mi)
- Elevation: 296 m (971 ft)

Population (Gen. 2013)
  - Total: 2,590
  - Density: 510/km^{2} (1,300/sq mi)
- Demonym: Caravatesi
- Time zone: UTC+1 (CET)
  - Summer (DST): UTC+2 (CEST)
- Postal code: 21032
- Dialing code: 0332

Caravate is a comune (municipality) in the Province of Varese in the Italian region Lombardy, located about 60 kilometres (37 mi) northwest of Milan and about 15 kilometres (9 mi) northwest of Varese. As of 31 December 2004, it had a population of 2,569 and an area of 5.1 square kilometres (2.0 mi^{2}).

The municipality of Caravate contains the frazioni (subdivisions, mainly villages and hamlets) Stallazzo, San Clemente, Fornazze, Canton d'Oro, Canton Chiedo, Cadè, Castello, Cà Stecco, Pozzei, Monte San Giano, Santa Maria del Sasso, Virolo, and Fornace Farsani.

Caravate borders the following municipalities: Besozzo, Cittiglio, Gemonio, Laveno-Mombello, Leggiuno, Sangiano.

== Demographic evolution ==
Historical population

Year	Pop.	±%
1861	1,273	—
1871	1,419	+11.5%
1881	1,525	+7.5%
1901	1,622	+6.4%
1911	1,821	+12.3%

Year	Pop.	±%
1921	1,643	−9.8%
1931	1,410	−14.2%
1936	1,263	−10.4%
1951	1,560	+23.5%
1961	1,982	+27.1%

Year	Pop.	±%
1971	2,145	+8.2%
1981	2,201	+2.6%
1991	2,471	+12.3%
2001	2,607	+5.5%
