= Icaro 2000 =

Italian aircraft manufacturer

Coordinates: 45.8783089°N 8.6278972°E

- Company type: Private company
- Industry: Aerospace
- Founded: 1973
- Founder: Alfio Caronti and Peter Skarupp
- Headquarters: Sangiano, Italy
- Products: Hang gliders Ultralight trikes
- Website: www.icaro2000.com

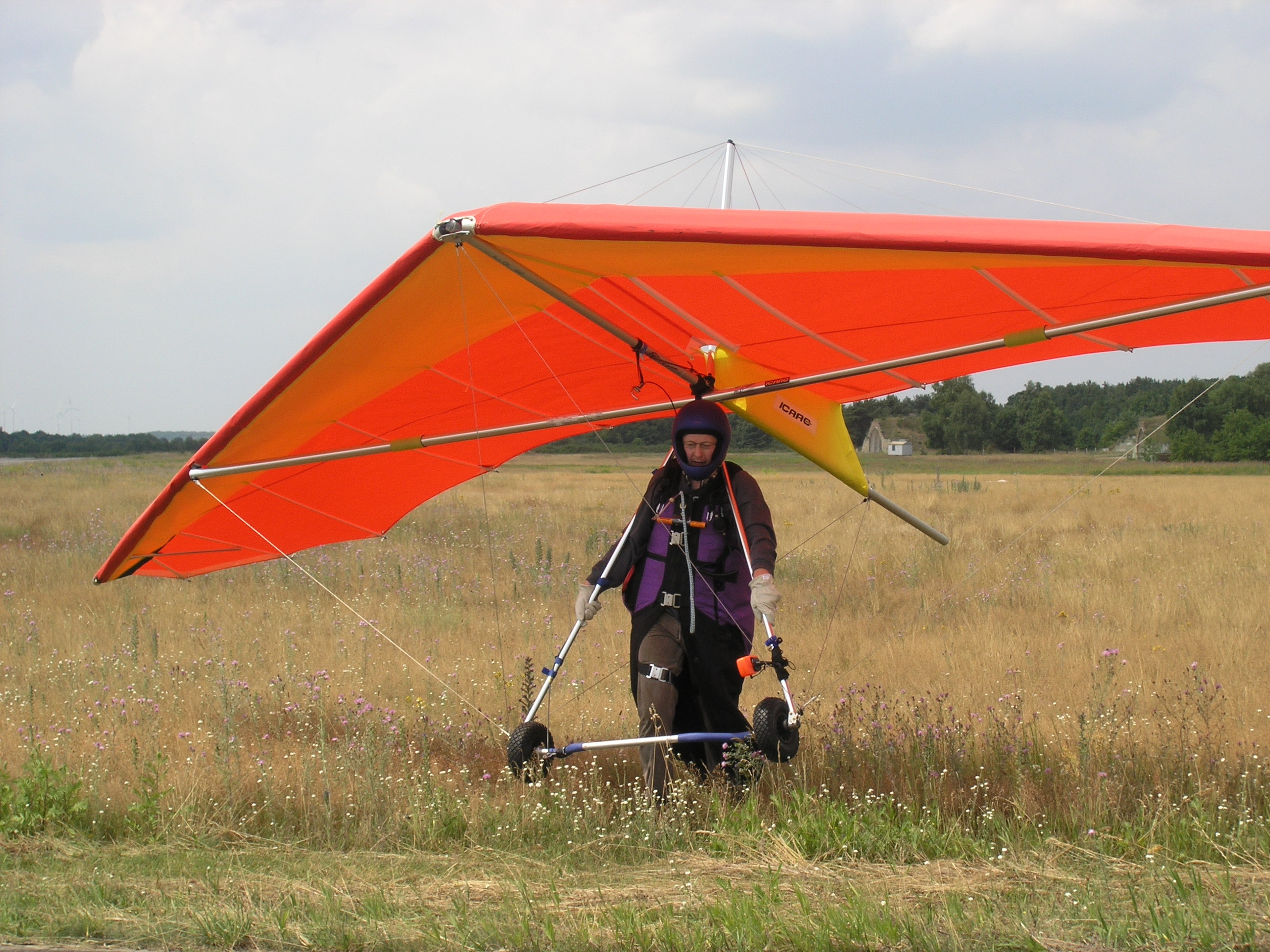
Icaro Mars 170 hang glider

Icaro 2000 is an Italian aircraft manufacturer, based in Sangiano. The company specializes in the design and manufacturer of hang gliders, ultralight trikes and hang gliding helmets.

By the end of 2010, the company had sold over 9,000 hang gliders, including many used by world champions.

== History ==
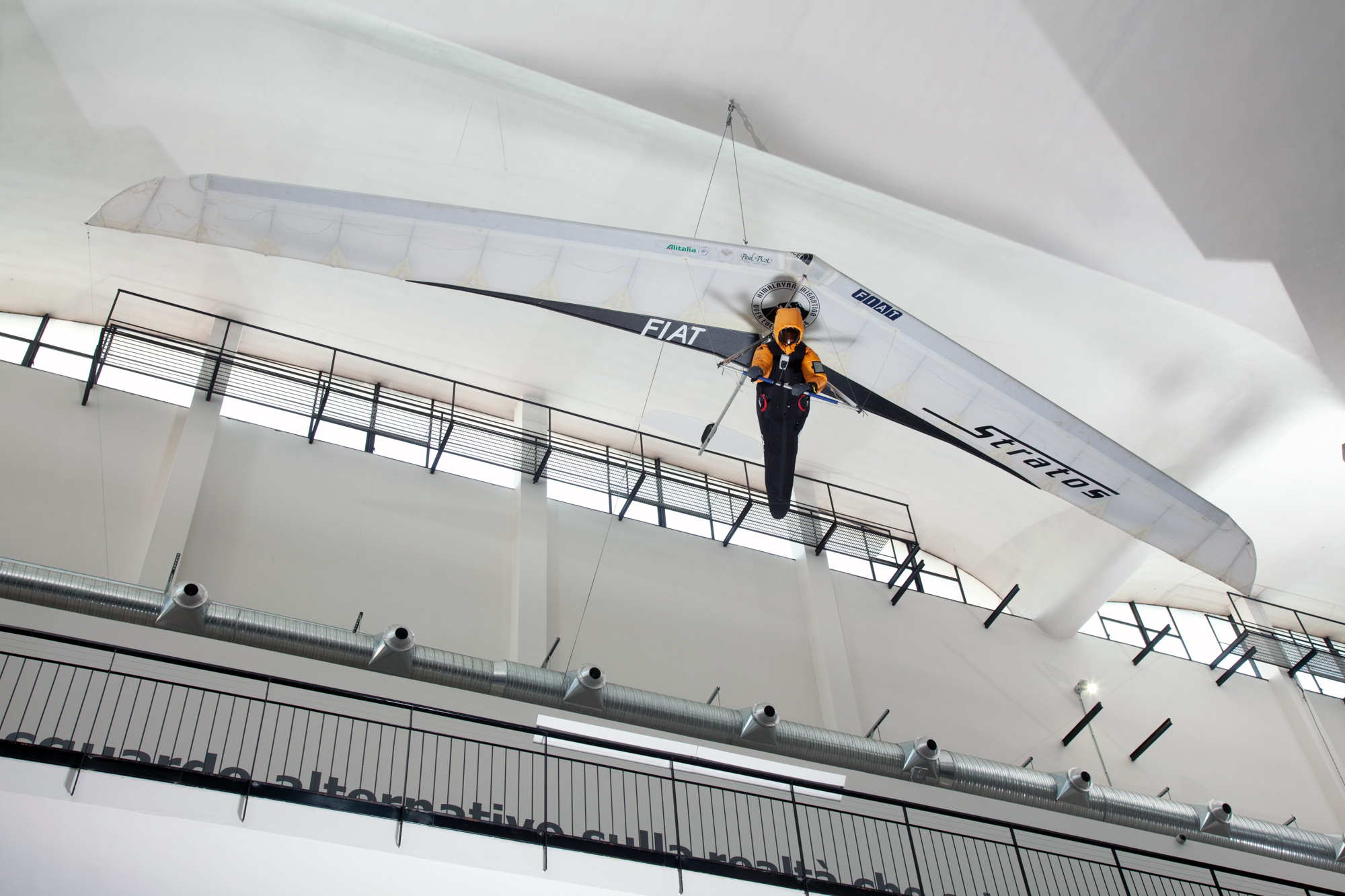
The Icaro Stratos exhibited at the Museo Nazionale della Scienza e della Tecnologia "Leonardo da Vinci", Milan

The company was founded in 1973 by Alfio Caronti and Peter Skarupp to produce Bill Moyes' hang glider designs under licence for boat towing. Franco Garzia & Gianni Hotz bought the company in 1981 and continued to produce Moyes' designs. By 1991, the company had sold more than 3,000 hang gliders and decided to develop its own designs and have each one DHV certified.

In 1992, Icaro 2000 introduced its first model, the Icaro Brazil. The highly successful Icaro Laminar was introduced in 1994 and remained in production in 2016, having been used by many world champions. The company introduced its first "topless" design, lacking a kingpost in 1996.

In 1998, the company starting making hang gliding helmets under the brand name 4fight.

During the mid-2000s, the company also produced paragliders, including the Icaro Cyber and Force. The company no longer sells paragliders.

== Aircraft ==
Summary of aircraft built by Icaro 2000
Model name	First flight	Number built	Type
Icaro Bip			hang glider
Icaro Brazil			hang glider
Icaro E-trike			electric powered ultralight trike
Icaro Laminar			hang glider
Icaro Mars			hang glider
Icaro MastR			hang glider
Icaro Orbiter			hang glider
Icaro Pit-Trike			electric powered ultralight trike designed by Manfred Ruhmer
Icaro Twin Electric			electric powered two-seat ultralight trike designed by Manfred Ruhmer
Icaro Relax			hang glider
Icaro RX2			hang glider
Icaro RXB			hang glider
Icaro Stratos			rigid-wing hang glider
Icaro Cyber	2001		paraglider
Icaro Force	mid-2000s		paraglider
Icaro Play	mid-2000s		paraglider

== See also ==
- List of Italian companies
