= Stefan Milenkovich =

Serbian violinist (born 1977)

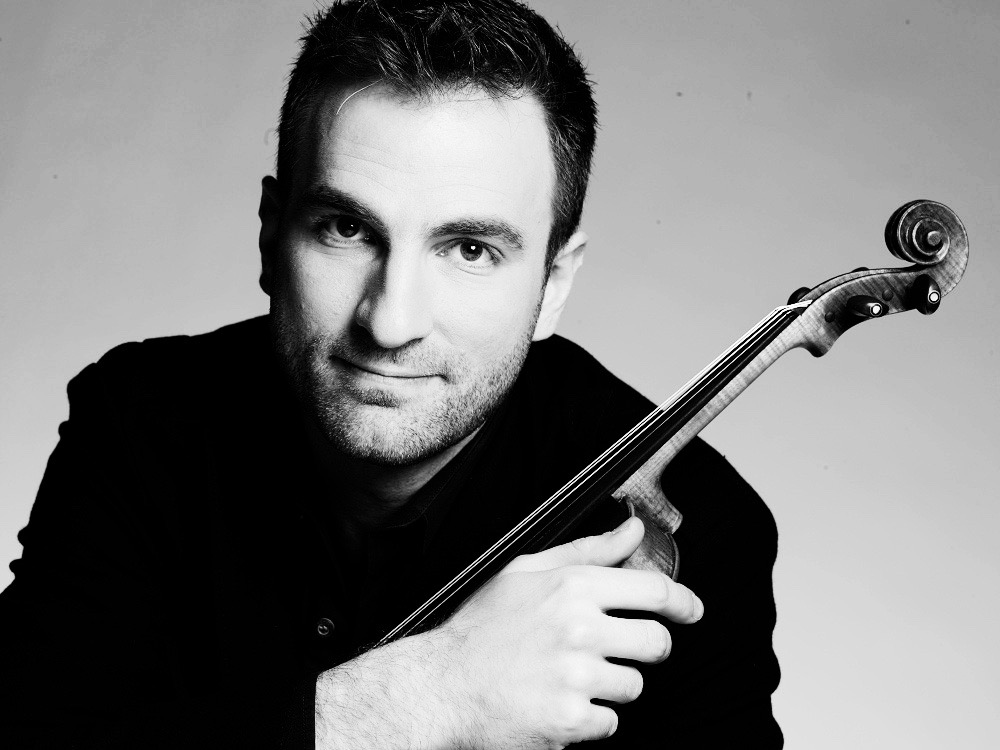

Background information
- Born: 25 January 1977 (age 49); Belgrade, SR Serbia, Yugoslavia
- Genre: Classical
- Occupation: Violinist
- Label: Dynamic
- Website: stefanmilenkovich.com

Stefan Milenkovich (Serbian: Stefan Milenković, Стефан Миленковић; born 25 January 1977) is a Serbian violinist.

== Early life ==
Milenković was born to a Serbian father, Zoran Milenković, and a Serbian-born mother of Italian descent, Lidija Kajnaco (Lidia Caenazzo). He started playing violin in 1980, at age three, taught by his father and often accompanied by his mother. His first public performance, in 1980, was followed by numerous youthful performances, including the Newport Rhode Island Music Festival and an appearance at a Reagan holiday special when he was ten years old, as well as a performance for Mikhail Gorbachev in 1988 and an appearance before Pope John Paul II when he was fourteen.

He participated in numerous international violin competitions, starting with the Jaroslav Kozian International Violin Competition before he was ten. Then, in rapid succession during 1993 and 1994, at age sixteen and seventeen, he took high prizes in ten international violin competitions. In 1993 he took third prize in the Menuhin Competition (England), reached the finalist level at the Queen Elisabeth Competition (Belgium), and won the Rodolfo Lipizer Prize (Italy). He entered the Paganini Competition (Italy) twice and the Tibor Varga Competition (Switzerland) twice, in 1993 and 1994, taking one fourth-place and three second-place prizes. Also in 1994 he took fourth place in the International Joseph Joachim Violin Competition, won the Louis Spohr International Violin Competition (both, Germany), and won Silver at the International Violin Competition of Indianapolis.

== Academics ==
Milenkovich studied at the Music Academy of Belgrade, receiving his master's degree in 1995. His successes on the competition circuit, along with winning Young Concert Artists status at the 1997 YCA auditions, led to his New York City recital debut at the 92nd Street Y in 1997, and his undertaking studies at the Juilliard School with Dorothy DeLay. He was awarded a violin degree at Juilliard in 1998 and taught in various roles at Juilliard over the next decade in collaboration with Ms. DeLay, in the Perlman Music Program on Shelter Island, and as assistant to Itzhak Perlman at the Juilliard School. In 2006 he joined the faculty of the University of Illinois, where he is an associate professor in the Instrumental Performance Division of the School of Music. Since 2011 he also teaches on the faculty of the University of Belgrade as visiting professor, and since 2021 as full professor of violin at the Novi Sad Academy of Arts.

== Performances ==
Milenkovich has performed extensively as a solo artist, in duets, in a wide variety of other small groups, and as a soloist with orchestra. For example, he recently performed Bach, Paganini, Ysaye and Kreisler solo works at the Hermitage of Santa Caterina del Sasso. He has recorded the Bach solo violin Sonatas and Partitas and the complete solo violin music of Niccolò Paganini.

The 92nd Street Y recital in 1997 was one event in a long-running collaboration with pianist Rohan de Silva, for example, a 1999 concert at the Kennedy Center and three concerts in Sri Lanka. A long-term collaboration with pianist Adam Neiman goes back at least as far as 2001. He has also collaborated with pianist Lera Auerbach and pianist Srebrenka Poljak and, working with Massimo Paderni, recorded selected Paganini violin/piano works. Other duo performances include Kenji Bunch's Three American Folk Hymn Settings for Two Violins with Viviane Hagner and a recording of Bunch's Paraphraseology with marimbist Makota Nakura on the Kleo Classics label.

Milenkovich, cellist Ani Aznavoorian and pianist Adam Neiman formed the Corinthian Trio in 1998 while they were students at the Juilliard School and this trio performed extensively for the next decade. The collaboration of Milenkovich and Adam Neiman continues, often with violist Che-Yen (Brian) Chen. For example, these three were joined by cellist Bion Tsang for the opening concert of the 2017 Manchester Music Festival. In addition to this, Milenkovich was once a member of the Formosa Quartet. The Jupiter Symphony Chamber Players series is an important outlet for Milenkovich's performance of chamber music, including a 2006 performance of an octet by Joachim Raff and a 2017 concert which featured Beethoven's second Razumovsky quartet and a Spohr quintet. Milenkovich played lead violin at a concert in the 2010 Naumburg Orchestral Concerts, consisting of Bach's D minor keyboard concerto with pianist Stephen Beus, Mendelssohn's E-flat Major Octet, and a cello quintet by Friedrich Dotzauer with cellist David Requiro, a co-winner of the 2008 International Naumburg Competition. Beus, Requiro and Milenkovich continue to collaborate in Jupiter Symphony Chamber Players concerts. Milenkovich, cellist Riccardo Agosti, and violinist Pier Domenico Sommati have recorded selected Paganini chamber works and Milenkovich participated in recording CD #8 in 10-CD set of the complete Paganini chamber music oeuvre. He sometimes dances as he plays the violin, especially in non-classical settings. Milenkovich has played tango concerts both in Europe and in the United States.

Milenkovich has performed the solo part in the violin concertos of Beethoven, Bruch (G minor), Dvořák, Mendelssohn (E minor), Sibelius and Tchaikovsky. He has recorded the violin concertos by Brahms and by Glazunov with the Slovenia Symphony Orchestra conducted by En Shao. Orchestras with whom Milenkovich has appeared include the Aspen Chamber Symphony, the Bacău Filarmonica, the National Orchestra of Belgium, the Berlin Symphony Orchestra, the Bolshoi Theatre Orchestra, the Orchestra of Radio-France, the Helsinki Philharmonic Orchestra, the Illinois Philharmonic Orchestra, the Indianapolis Symphony Orchestra, the Lake Forest Symphony, the National Symphony Orchestra of Mexico, the Odessa Philharmonic Orchestra, the Orpheus Chamber Orchestra, the São Paulo State Symphony, the Sarajevo Philharmonic Orchestra, and the Utah Symphony chamber orchestra. And recently, Milenkovich made his debut with the Orchestra RAI of Turin.

In 2020 Milenković started living in Serbia with his family, and he started to work as the artistic director of the concert hall of the city of Novi Sad., as well as teach as professor of violin at the Novi Sad Academy of Arts.

== Instruments ==
Milenkovich has performed on the “Lyall” Stradivari violin (1702) and the “Sennhauser” Guarneri del Gesú (1735) on loan from the Stradivari Society. From 2006 until 2017, he performed on a violin by Peter Aznavoorian (Chicago, 2006). Currently, Milenkovich owns and plays a violin by Giovanni Battista Guadagnini (Turin, 1783), as well as 2024 violin by Philip Ihle.

== Awards and Competitions ==
- 2023 "February Award", the city of Novi Sad
- 2021 "Stefan Prvovenčani" award by Raška Music Festival
- 2021 Order of Karađorđe's Star First Degree
- 2018 "Career Award" by Emilia Romagna Festival
- 2017 „Dimitrije Mitrinović” award for contribution to Serbian culture and dedication to fine arts
- 2010 Serbia's Brand Personality of the Year
- 2003 Humanitarian of the Year (Serbia)
- 2002 Artist of the Century (Serbia)
- 2002 Lifting Up the World With a Oneness Heart, awarded by Sri Chinmoy
- 1997 Winner of Young Concert Artists
- 1994 1st Prize Winner of Ludwig Spohr International Violin Competition

== Discography ==
- Beethoven and Bruch Violin Concertos, RTV Slovenia Symphony Orchestra, conductor Vladimir Kulenović (ZKP RTVS, 2019)
- Brahms and Glazunov Violin Concertos, RTV Slovenia Symphony Orchestra, En Shao conductor (ZKP RTVS, 2015)
- Vittorio Giannini: Quintet for Piano and Strings; Trio for Piano and Strings [World Premiere Recordings]
- Niccolò Paganini: Complete Music for Solo Violin (Dynamic 1996)
- Niccolò Paganini: In cor più non mi sento (Dynamic 1996) First Recording
- Niccolò Paganini: Recital (Dynamic 1996)
- J.S. Bach: Sonatas and Partitas for Solo Violin, BWV 1001–1006
- Stefan Milenkovich and Marko Hatlak "Tango Compás" (Klopotec, 2014)
