= Icaro Stratos =

Italian hang glider

Stratos
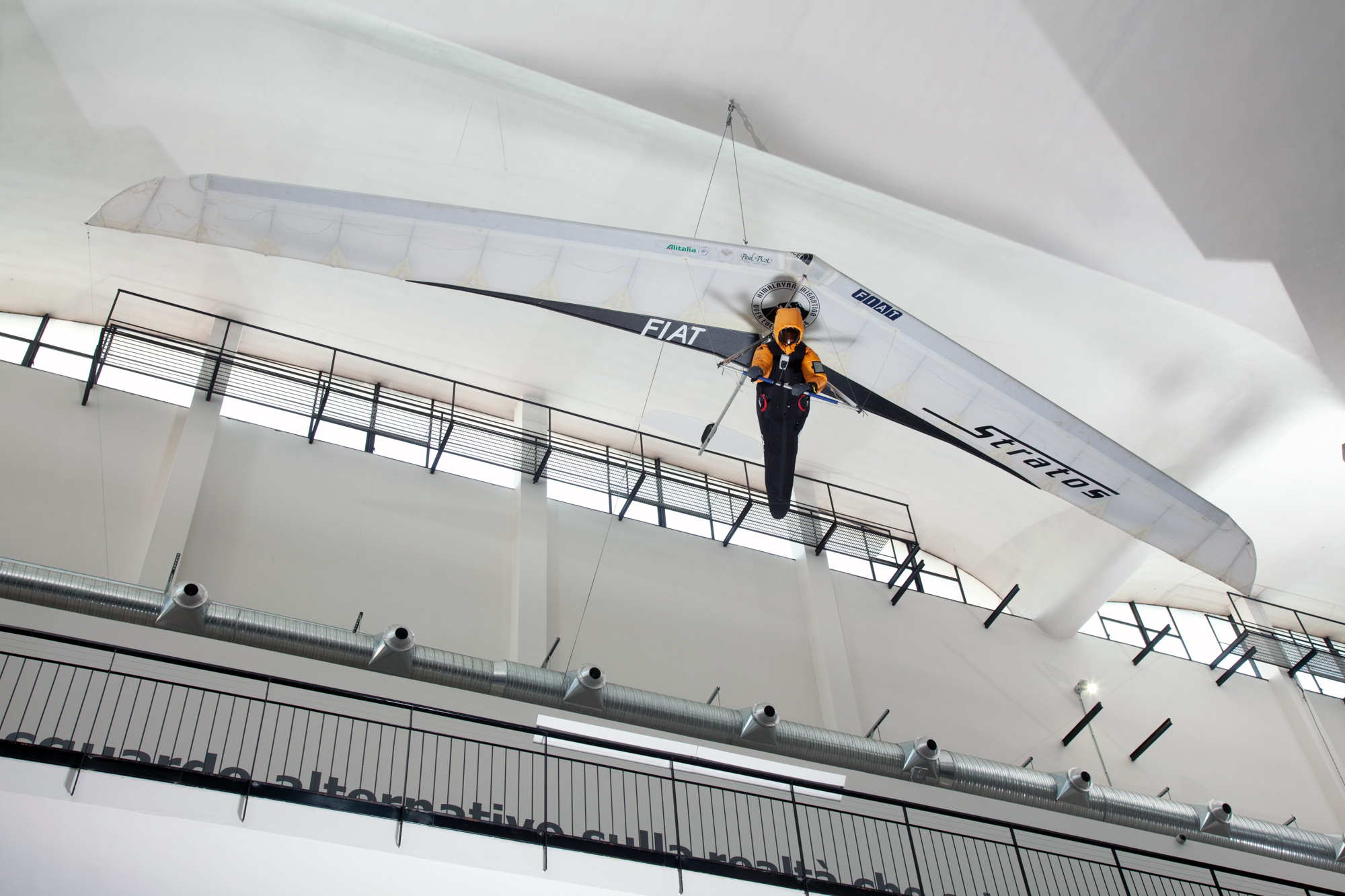
- The Icaro Stratos at Museo Nazionale della Scienza e della Tecnologia "Leonardo da Vinci", Milan

General information
- Type: Hang glider
- National origin: Italy
- Manufacturer: Icaro 2000
- Status: Production completed

The Icaro Stratos is an Italian high-wing, single-place, rigid-wing hang glider that was designed by Icaro 2000 in conjunction with A-I-R GmbH and Felix Ruhle and produced by Icaro 2000, of Sangiano, circa 2003.

== Design and development ==
The Stratos was a collaborative project between A-I-R GmbH and Icaro 2000. Following the launch of this model both companies pursued their own directions on rigid wing design, although they continued to collaborate on parts manufacture.

The aircraft is made from tubing, with the wing covered in Dacron sailcloth. The Stratos was built in two sizes to accommodate differing pilot weights, "L" and "M".

== Operational history ==
The Laminar was used to win the World Hang Gliding Championships in 2002 in Class 5, Rigid Wing.

Angelo d'Arrigo flew a Stratos on the first flight over Mount Everest (8848 m), on 24 May 2004, setting an altitude record for hang gliders.

== Variants ==
Stratos L
Large sized model for heavier pilots. Its 13.25 m (43.5 ft) span wing has an aspect ratio of 11.9 and a wing area of 13.8 m^{2} (149 sq ft). Pilot hook-in weight range is 80 to 110 kg (176 to 243 lb). Certified as DHV Class 3.
Stratos M
Small sized model for lighter pilots. Its 11.8 m (38.7 ft) span wing has an aspect ratio of 12.7 and a wing area of 11.8 m^{2} (127 sq ft). Pilot hook-in weight range is 60 to 90 kg (132 to 198 lb).

== Aircraft on display ==
- Museo Nazionale della Scienza e della Tecnologia "Leonardo da Vinci", Milan, Italy

== Specifications (Stratos L) ==
Data from Bertrand

General characteristics

- Crew: one
- Wingspan: 13.25 m (43 ft 6 in)
- Wing area: 13.8 m^{2} (149 sq ft)
- Aspect ratio: 11.9:1
