= Cittiglio =

- Comune
- Comune di Cittiglio
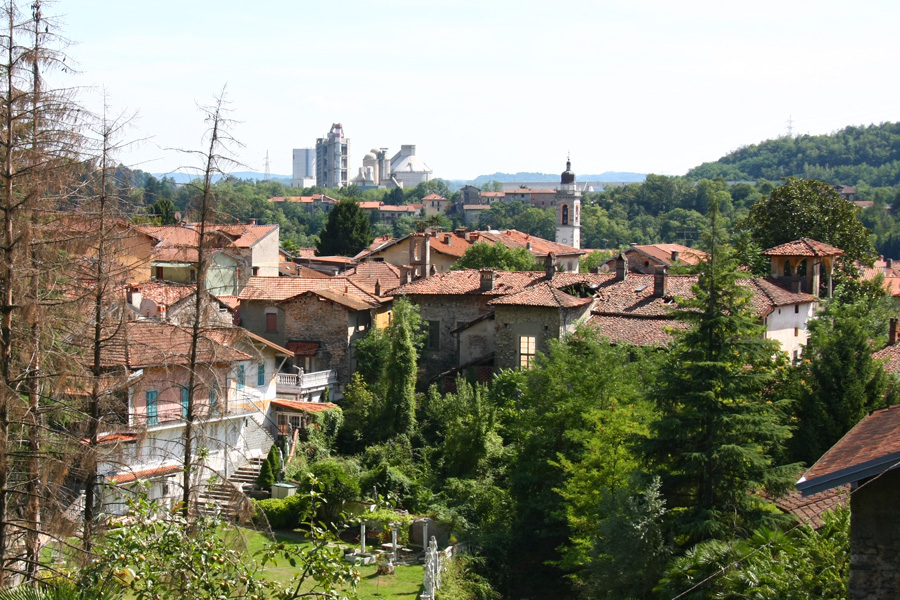

- Location within Italy Location within Lombardy
- Coordinates: 45°54′N 8°40′E
- Country: Italy
- Region: Lombardy
- Province: Province of Varese (VA)

Area
  - Total: 11.5 km^{2} (4.4 sq mi)

Population (Dec. 2004)
  - Total: 3,817
  - Density: 332/km^{2} (860/sq mi)
- Time zone: UTC+1 (CET)
  - Summer (DST): UTC+2 (CEST)
- Postal code: 21033
- Dialing code: 0332
- Website: Official website

Cittiglio is a comune (municipality) in the Province of Varese in the Italian region Lombardy, located about 60 kilometres (37 mi) northwest of Milan and about 15 kilometres (9 mi) northwest of Varese. As of 31 December 2004, it had a population of 3,817 and an area of 11.5 square kilometres (4.4 mi^{2}). The town is known as the birthplace of Alfredo Binda, a world-class bicycle racer in the 1920s and 1930s.

Cittiglio borders the following municipalities: Brenta, Caravate, Castelveccana, Gemonio, Laveno-Mombello.

The elite women's professional road bicycle racing event Trofeo Alfredo Binda-Comune di Cittiglio is held annually here.

== Demographic evolution ==
Historical population

Year	Pop.	±%
1861	1,380	—
1871	1,531	+10.9%
1881	1,624	+6.1%
1901	1,589	−2.2%
1911	1,615	+1.6%

Year	Pop.	±%
1921	1,647	+2.0%
1931	1,755	+6.6%
1936	1,733	−1.3%
1951	2,014	+16.2%
1961	2,417	+20.0%

Year	Pop.	±%
1971	3,079	+27.4%
1981	3,634	+18.0%
1991	3,564	−1.9%
2001	3,718	+4.3%

Source: Data from ISTAT

== Twin towns ==
Cittiglio is twinned with:

- Camerota, Italy
