= San Pietro, Gemonio =

Church in Gemonio, Italy

Coordinates: 45.874615154388934°N 8.673866657386931°E

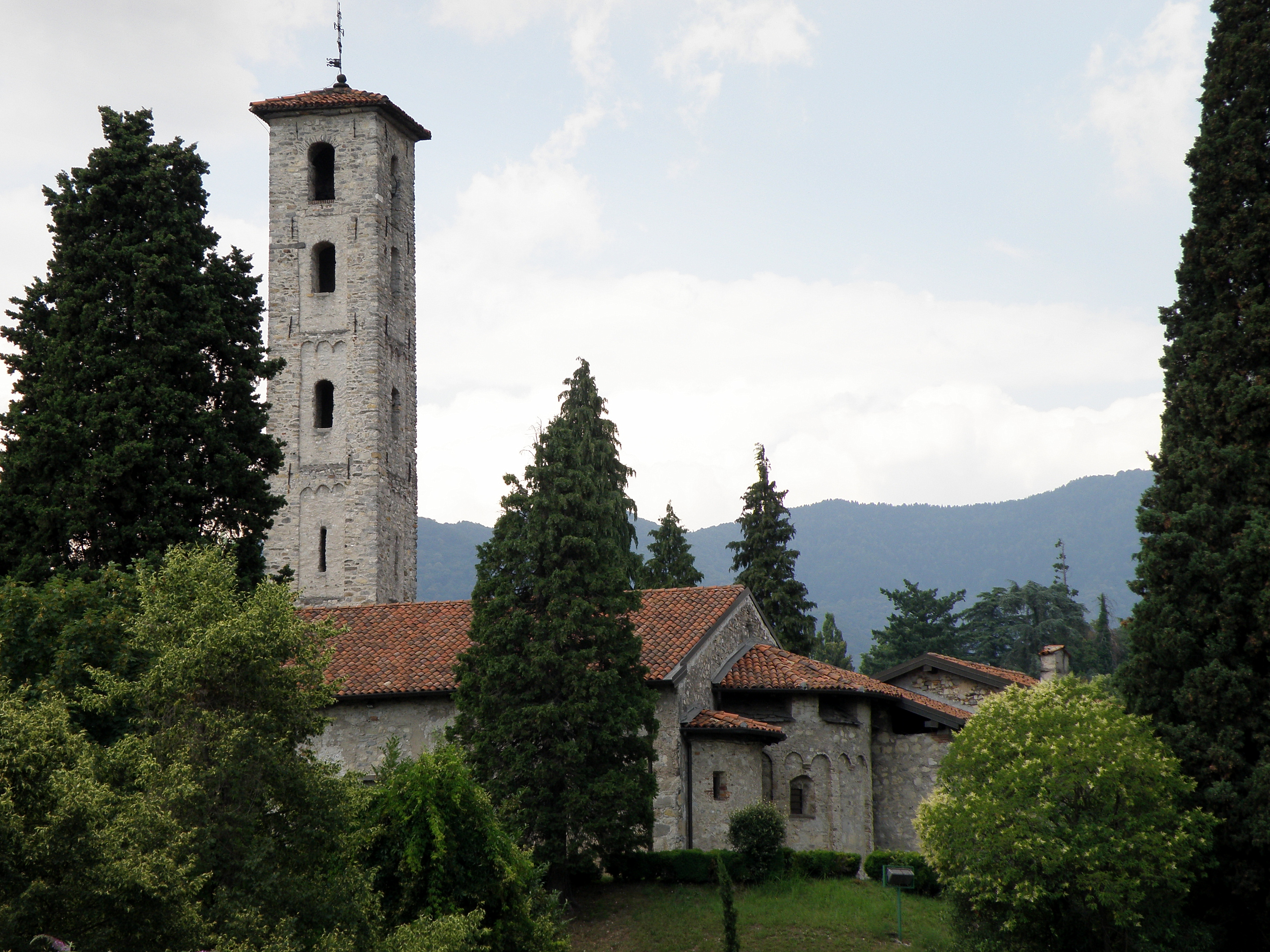
Church and bell-tower

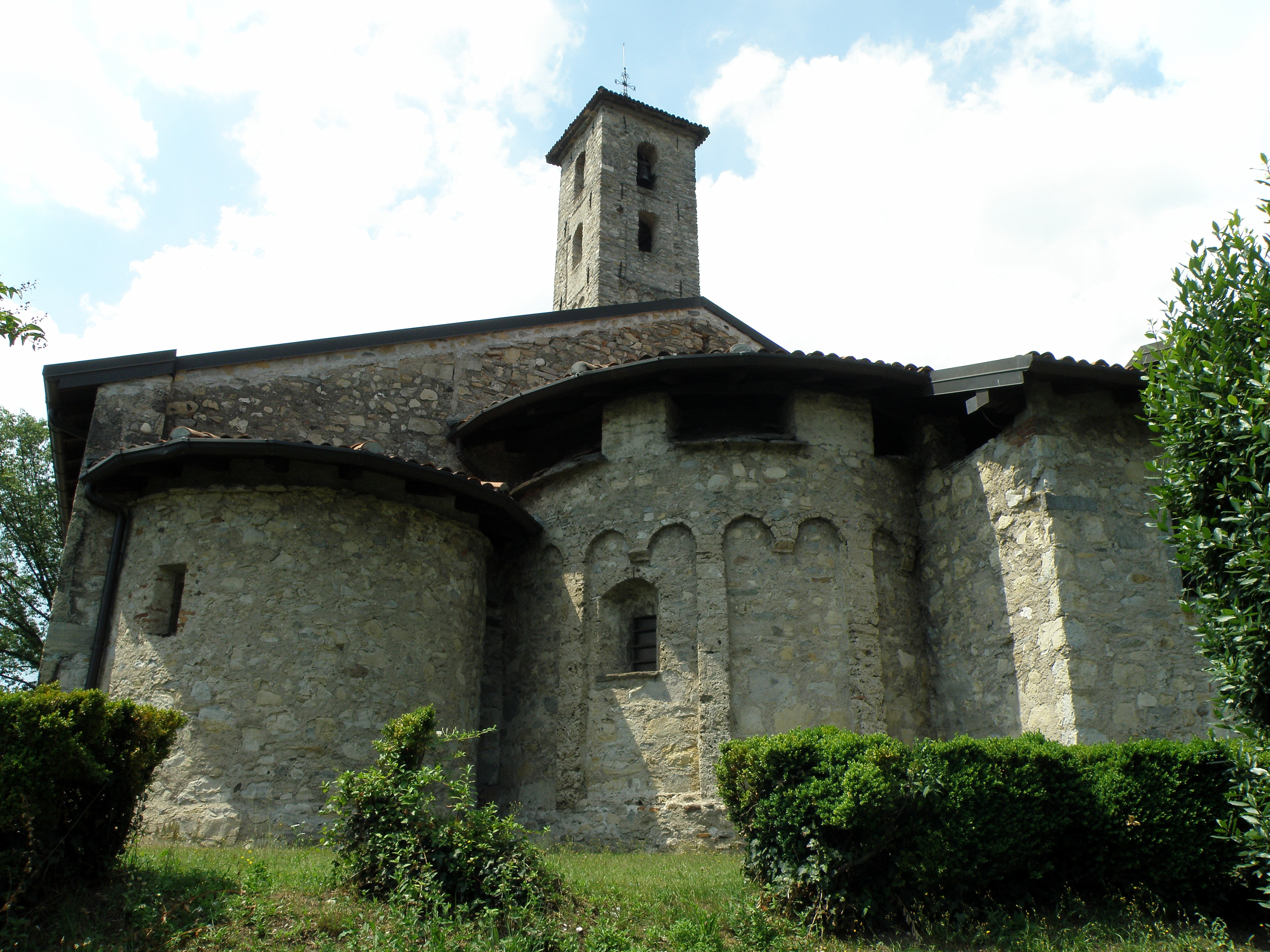
Apse of church

San Pietro is a Romanesque Roman Catholic church in Gemonio, Varese, region of Lombardy, Italy. It is in the jurisdiction of deanery of Cittiglio, in the Diocese of Como.

== History ==
The stone church has been refurbished and enlarged over the years, but retains some of the early Romanesque elements. It is suspected that the apse dates to a grant in 712 by King Liutprand for the refurbishment of a chapel. The original church had a single nave with small windows. The tall bell tower was added in 1010–1020.

Fresco in the church of San Pietro, on a pillar of the central nave, representing Saint Peter

The second nave was likely added in the 11th century, but the third was not added until the 15th century.

In the 21st century, the church is still used for religious services, concerts, as well as festivals.
