= Sasso del Ferro =

Mountain in Italy

Coordinates: 45°54′42″N 8°38′37″E

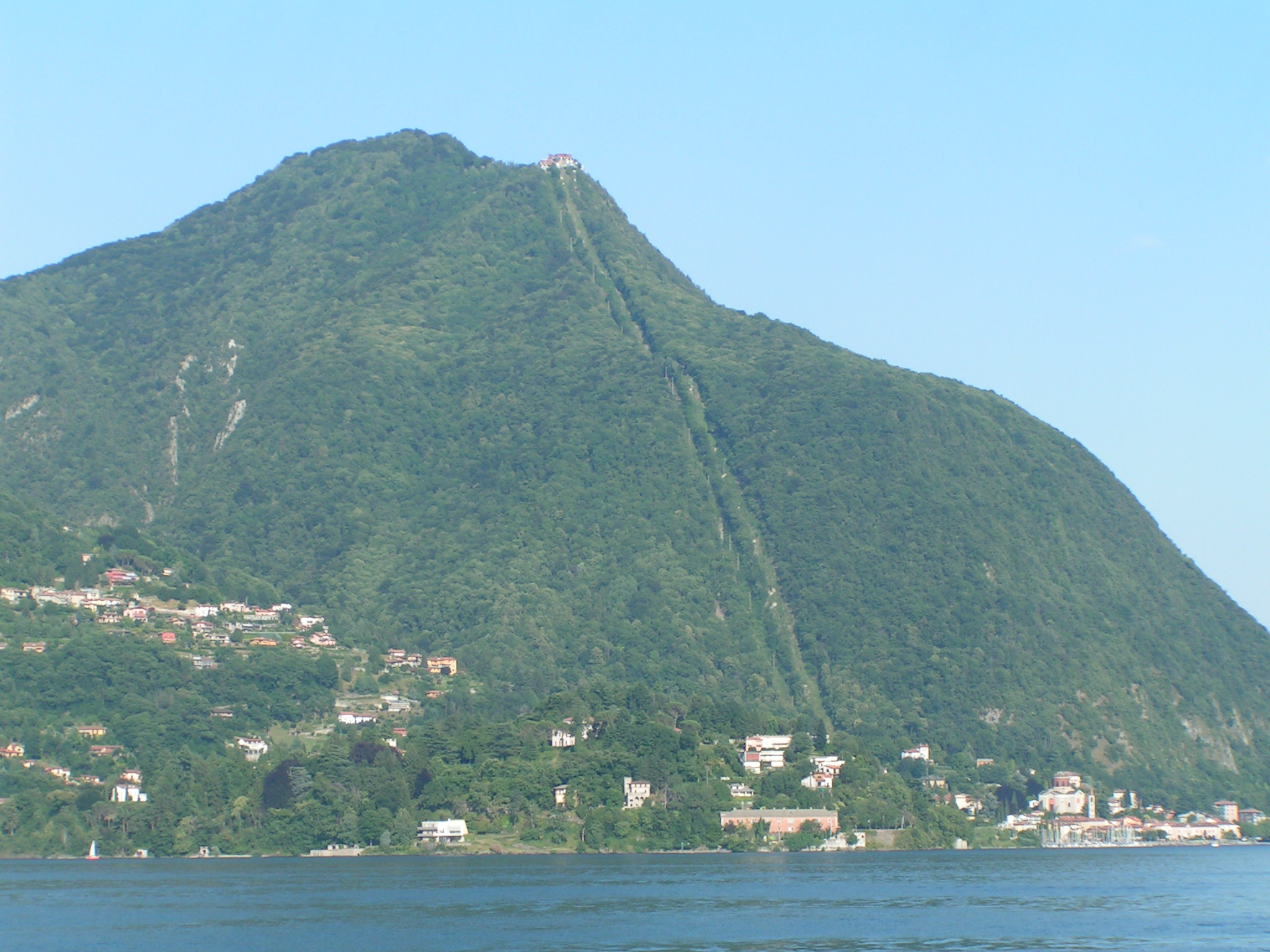

Highest point
- Elevation: 1,062 m (3,484 ft)
- Prominence: 323 m (1,060 ft)

Geography
- Location: Lombardy, Italy

Sasso del Ferro is a mountain of Lombardy, Italy. It has an elevation of 1,062 metres above sea level.

At its base sits the town of Laveno-Mombello, from which the mountain is served by a funicular cable ride to the top. The top of the mountain has a hotel and restaurant popular among tourists, along with a launch board for hang gliders and, alternatively, a hiking path to descend the mountain.
