= Gemonio =

- Comune
- Comune di Gemonio
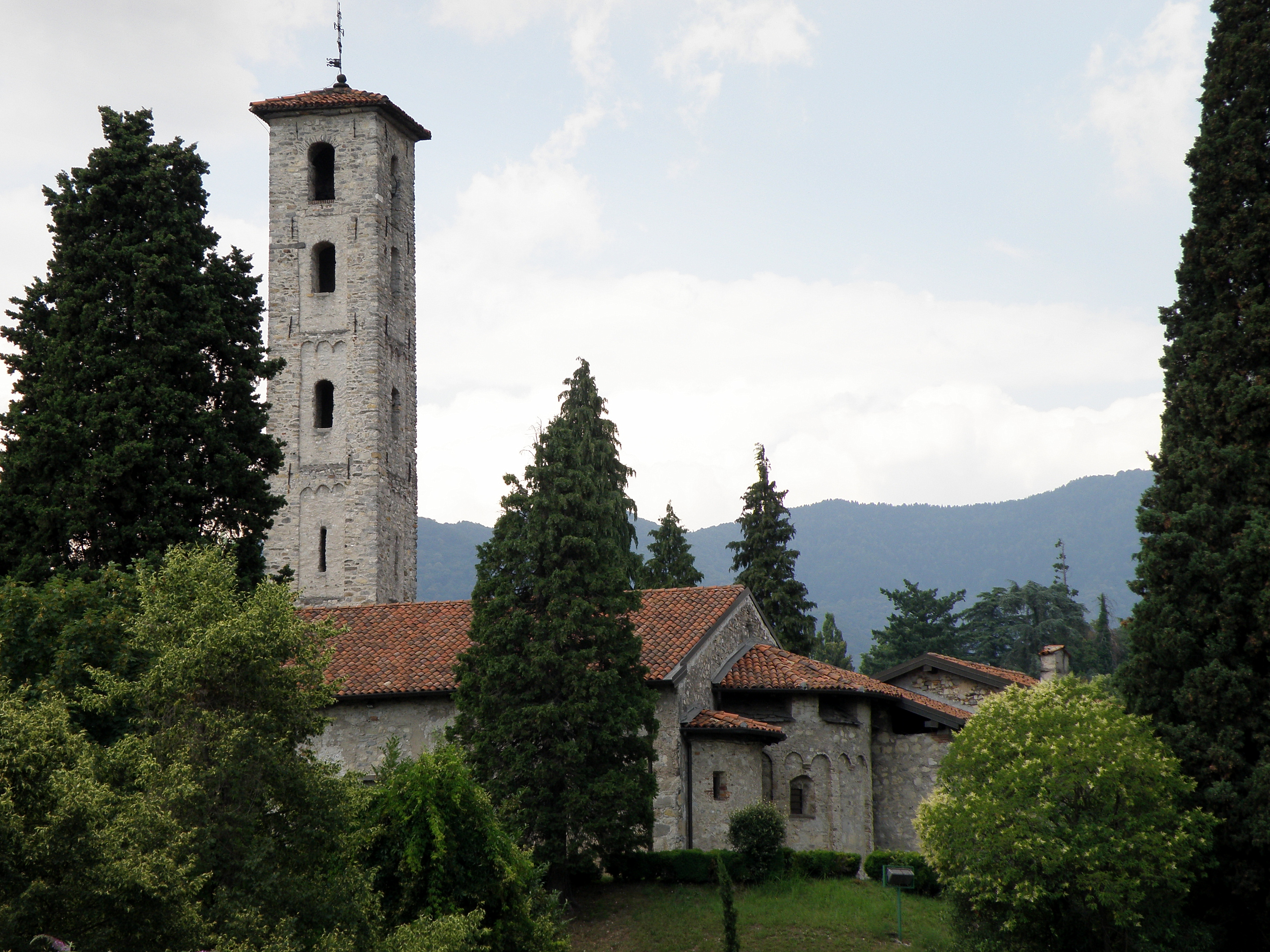
- Romanesque church of San Pietro

- Location within Italy Location within Lombardy
- Coordinates: 45°53′N 8°41′E
- Country: Italy
- Region: Lombardy
- Province: Province of Varese (VA)
- Frazioni: Martit, Conficùra, San Pietro, Mirabella, Brosch, Galizia

Government
  - Mayor: Samuel Lucchini

Area
  - Total: 3.7 km^{2} (1.4 sq mi)
- Elevation: 303 m (994 ft)

Population (Dec. 2017)
  - Total: 2,878
  - Density: 780/km^{2} (2,000/sq mi)
- Demonym: Gemoniesi
- Time zone: UTC+1 (CET)
  - Summer (DST): UTC+2 (CEST)
- Postal code: 21036
- Dialing code: 0332

Gemonio is a comune (municipality) in the Province of Varese in the Lombardy region of Italy, located about 60 kilometres (37 mi) northwest of Milan and about 14 kilometres (9 mi) northwest of Varese. As of 31 December 2022, it had a population of 2,851 and an area of 3.7 square kilometres (1.4 mi^{2}).

Gemonio borders the following municipalities: Azzio, Besozzo, Brenta, Caravate, Cittiglio, Cocquio-Trevisago.

In Gemonio lives Umberto Bossi, an Italian politician.

== Demographic evolution ==
Historical population

Year	Pop.	±%
1861	1,056	—
1871	1,062	+0.6%
1881	1,180	+11.1%
1901	1,182	+0.2%
1911	1,380	+16.8%

Year	Pop.	±%
1921	1,407	+2.0%
1931	1,398	−0.6%
1936	1,383	−1.1%
1951	1,709	+23.6%
1961	1,964	+14.9%

Year	Pop.	±%
1971	2,227	+13.4%
1981	2,232	+0.2%
1991	2,393	+7.2%
2001	2,552	+6.6%

Source: Data from ISTAT
