= Santa Caterina del Sasso =

Roman Catholic monastery in Lombardy, Italy

Hermitage of Santa Caterina del Sasso (Eremo di Santa Caterina del Sasso)
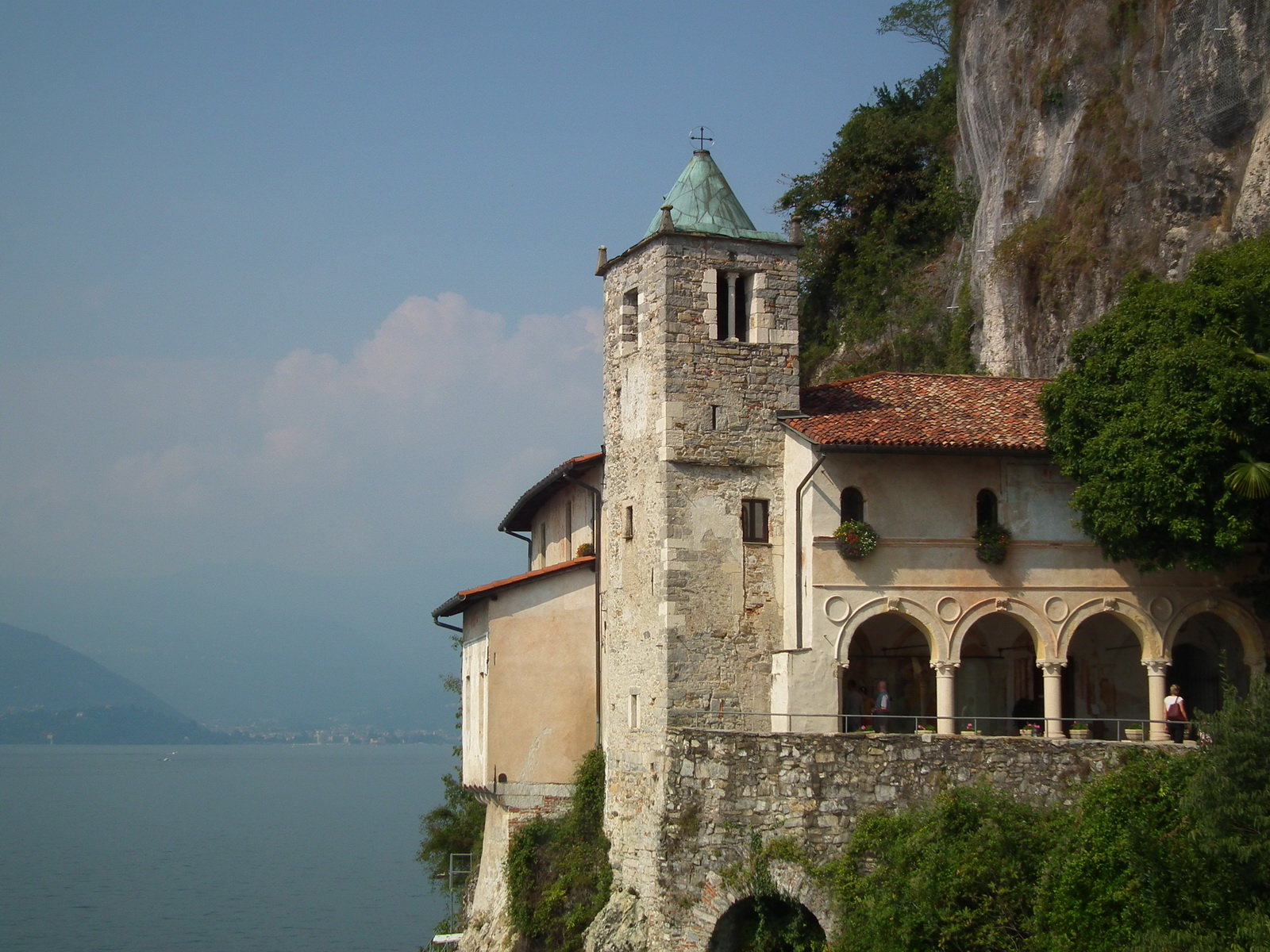
- Façade and the bell tower of the church.

Religion
- Affiliation: Roman Catholic
- Province: Varese
- Ecclesiastical or organisational status: National monument
- Status: Active

Location
- Location: Leggiuno, Italy
- Interactive map of Hermitage of Santa Caterina del Sasso (Eremo di Santa Caterina del Sasso)
- Coordinates: 45.877411°N 8.596887°E

Architecture
- Type: Church
- Style: Romanesque
- Groundbreaking: 1170
- Completed: 19th century

Website
- santacaterinadelsasso.com

Hermitage of Santa Caterina del Sasso (Italian: Eremo di Santa Caterina del Sasso) is a Roman Catholic monastery located in the municipality of Leggiuno, in the Province of Varese and the region of Lombardy, Italy. It is perched on a rocky ridge on the eastern shore 16m above Lake Maggiore.

The monastery can be reached on foot by descending down a long winding stairway or by taking an elevator or by a number of ferry services or boats that dock at the pier.

The construction of the monastery dates from the 14th century, although the more recent frescos are from the 19th century. It consists of three buildings: the southern convent, the convent and the main church. In 1914 it was declared a national monument. You get the best view of Santa Caterina from the ferry boat on the Lago Maggiore, and the first thing you see is that the monastery consists of three chapels.

== History ==
Alberto Besozzi founded Santa Caterina del Sasso, a wealthy cloth merchant who survived a violent storm at sea. After that experience, he lived as a hermit in a grotto at exactly this place. In 1195 he was asked for spiritual support by the residents of Lago Maggiore. In return, he asked to construct a chapel, Santa Caterina del Sasso. Alberto Besozzi died in 1205 and was buried there. This was the beginning of this fascinating monastery, and it was extended over the centuries. Inside are excellent frescoes from the 13th to the 17th century. The first chapel, the chapter house, was extended by an additional floor in the 17th century, and the famous frescoes of the great crucifixion got heavily damaged. The main chapel is the most beautiful, with frescoes in the baroque vault in the nave. You will also find a wooden replica of the eremite in the back of the main chapel.

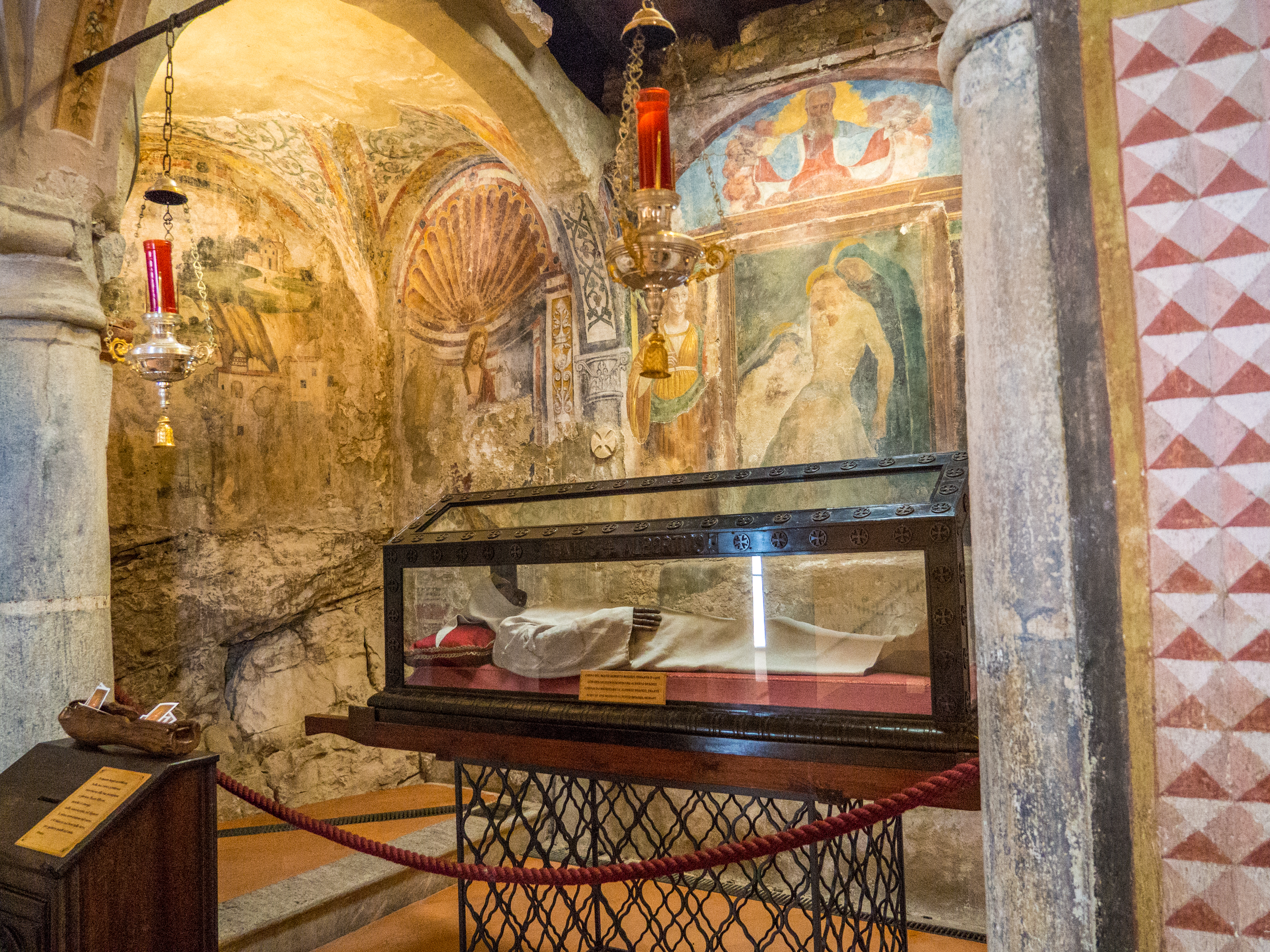
The wooden replica of the eremite, the blessed Alberto Besozzi of Arolo, died Sep. 3rd, 1205
