= Sangiano =

- Comune
- Comune di Sangiano

- Location within Italy Location within Lombardy
- Coordinates: 45°52′N 8°38′E
- Country: Italy
- Region: Lombardy
- Province: Province of Varese (VA)

Area
  - Total: 2.2 km^{2} (0.85 sq mi)

Population (Dec. 2004)
  - Total: 1,345
  - Density: 610/km^{2} (1,600/sq mi)
- Demonym: Sangianesi
- Time zone: UTC+1 (CET)
  - Summer (DST): UTC+2 (CEST)
- Postal code: 21038
- Dialing code: 0332

Sangiano is a comune (municipality) in the Province of Varese in the Italian region Lombardy, located about 60 kilometres (37 mi) northwest of Milan and about 15 kilometres (9 mi) northwest of Varese. As of 31 December 2004, it had a population of 1,345 and an area of 2.2 square kilometres (0.85 mi^{2}).

Sangiano borders the following municipalities: Besozzo, Caravate, Laveno-Mombello, Leggiuno. In the area of Sangiano there's a limestone rock wall called "falesia del Picuz" prepared for sport climbing with fixed bolts and belays.

The Nobel Prize Winner of Literature in 1997, Dario Fo, was born here.

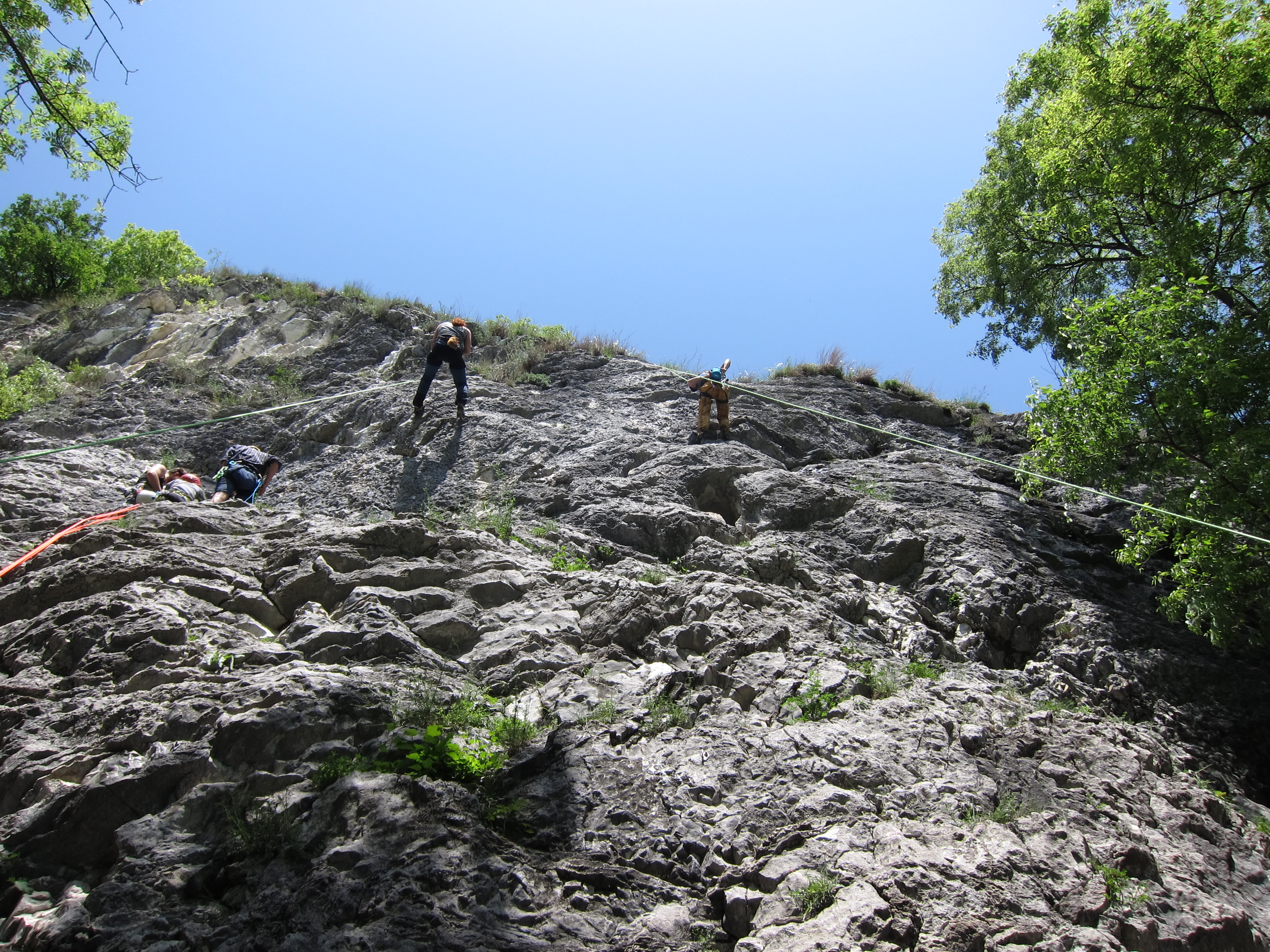
Rock climbing in Sangiano

== Demographic evolution ==
Historical population

Year	Pop.	±%
1861	478	—
1871	526	+10.0%
1881	651	+23.8%
1901	826	+26.9%
1911	932	+12.8%

Year	Pop.	±%
1921	955	+2.5%
1931	800	−16.2%
1936	731	−8.6%
1951	1,071	+46.5%
1961	1,044	−2.5%

Year	Pop.	±%
1971	1,123	+7.6%
1981	1,233	+9.8%
1991	1,167	−5.4%
2001	1,247	+6.9%

Source: Data from ISTAT
