= Leggiuno =

- Comune
- Comune di Leggiuno
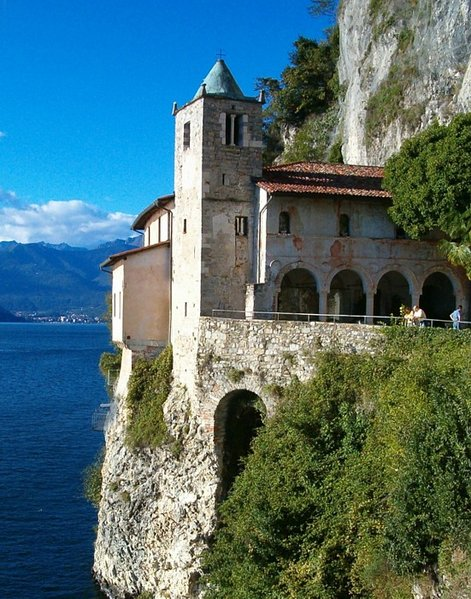
- Hermitage of Santa Caterina del Sasso, at Reno.

- Coat of arms

- Location within Italy Location within Lombardy
- Coordinates: 45°52′36.48″N 8°37′18.12″E
- Country: Italy
- Region: Lombardy
- Province: Varese (VA)
- Frazioni: Arolo, Ballarate, Baraggia, Bosco, Casa Motta, Campagna, Cellina, Cobbione, Ghirate, La Gesiola, Marzaro, Mirasole, Quicchio, Reno, Roncaccio, Rozzoni, Santa Caterina del Sasso, Santa Maria, Sasso Moro

Government
  - Mayor: Adriano Costantini

Area
  - Total: 13 km^{2} (5.0 sq mi)
- Elevation: 240 m (790 ft)

Population (2018-01-01)
  - Total: 3,405
  - Density: 260/km^{2} (680/sq mi)
- Demonym: Leggiunesi
- Time zone: UTC+1 (CET)
  - Summer (DST): UTC+2 (CEST)
- Postal code: 21038
- Dialing code: 0332
- Patron saint: St. Stephen
- Saint day: 26 December
- Website: Official website

Leggiuno is a town and comune in the province of Varese, Lombardy, Italy.

It is the birthplace of Gigi Riva, a footballer of AC Legnano, Cagliari Calcio and the Italy national football team. The operatic tenor Giuseppe Borgatti died there in retirement in 1950.

== Main sights ==
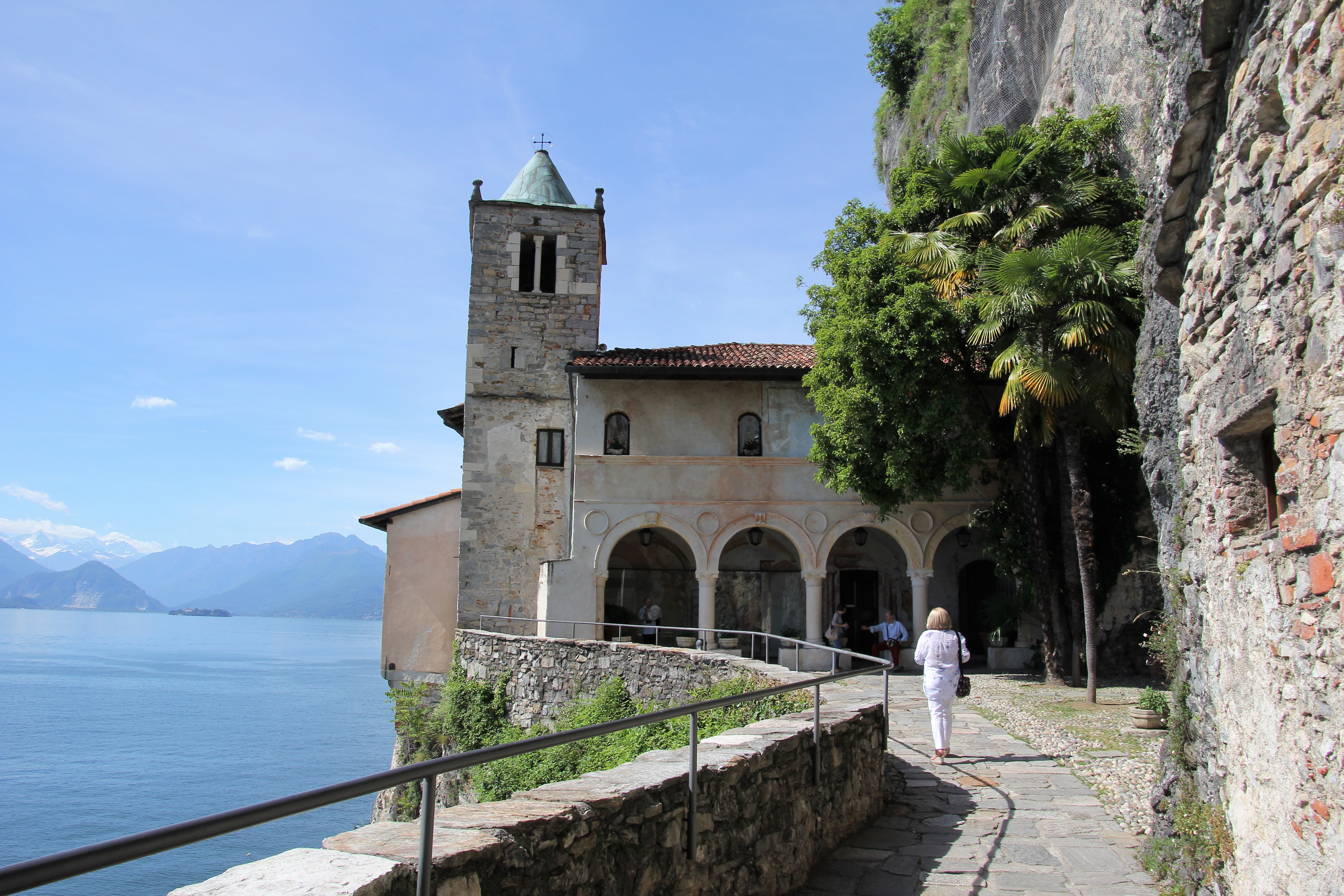
Santa Caterina del Sasso

The frazione of Reno is home to the hermitage of Santa Caterina del Sasso, which overlooks Lake Maggiore. Local tradition has it that it dates back to the 12th century and was founded by the hermit Alberto Besozzi. Though still in use as a monastery, it serves mainly as a tourist attraction and pilgrimage site.
