= Canzo =

Canzo Canz (Lombard)
- Comune
- Comune di Canzo
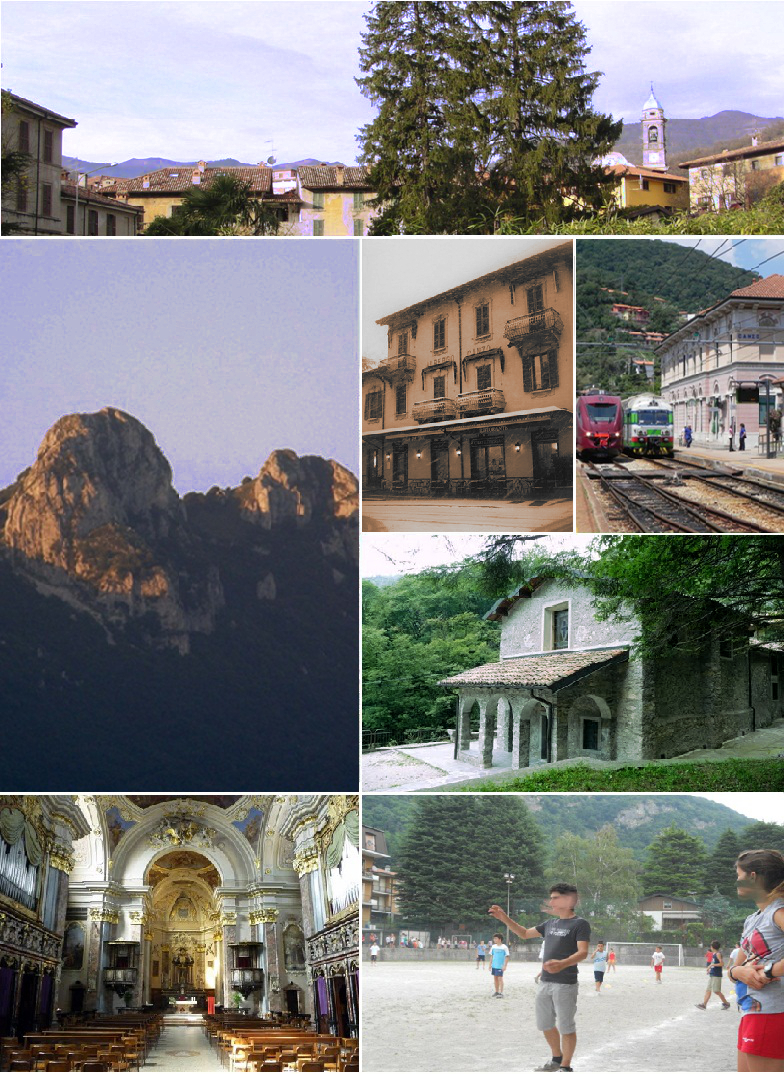
- Clockwise from top: Canzo skyline; an historical hotel; Canzo-Asso railway station; Saint Mir's hermitage; Catholic youth summer camp near Canzo; Saint Stephen parish church (interior); and Corni di Canzo (Canzo's Horns) mountain top
- Nickname: The last town of Brianza
- Location within Italy Location within Lombardy
- Coordinates: 45°51′N 09°16′E
- Country: Italy
- Region: Lombardy
- Province: Como (CO)
- -Settled by Celts: -Incorporated in Roman Republic (later: Empire): -Communal sovereignty: -Adhesion to Italian unification (Risorgimento): c. 450 BC fl. 194 BC; 800?–1414 c. 1830

Government
  - Mayor: Giulio Nava

Area
  - Total: 12 km^{2} (4.6 sq mi)
- Elevation: 402 m (1,319 ft)

Population (2018-01-01)
  - Total: 5,192
  - Density: 430/km^{2} (1,100/sq mi)
- Demonym(s): Canzés (Lombard); Gosdacaanz (West. Lomb.); Matèll (in Canzo's dialect); Canzese (Italian)
- Time zone: UTC+1 (CET)
  - Summer (DST): UTC+2 (CEST)
- Postal code: 22035
- Dialing code: 031
- Patron saint: Saint Steven
- Saint day: 26 December
- Website: Official website

Canzo (Italian: [ˈkantso]; Lombard: Canz, Lombard: [ˈkãː(t)s]; locally: Lombard: [ˈkaːnts]) is a comune (municipality) of the Italian province of Como. It is the last town north of the historical Brianza region of Lombardy, capital of the Lake Como Triangle community and a regional tourism destination.

It has 5,192 citizens and an area of 11.8 square kilometres (4.6 mi^{2}), a density of 445 persons/km^{2} (1,100/sq mi).

Its history began in the 5th century BC, when it was founded by Celts and Gaulish Insubres. Prehistoric settlements date to the Mesolithic period and the Copper Age. The name of the town comes from the Latin Cantius, itself from the Celtic root meaning edge.

It is known in Lombardy for its mountains, particularly the Corni di Canzo (Canzo's Horns) and the Cornizzolo. The surroundings are rich in watercourses and springs. Lago del Segrino is a glacial lake fed by underground springs. Canzo hosts BIOFERA, one of the main organic farming events in Italy.

According to a statistic of the major financial newspaper of Italy, Canzo is a leader place of hobbies and security and the 1st borough for social vitality in the Italian mountains.

== History ==
=== Founding and pre-Christian period ===
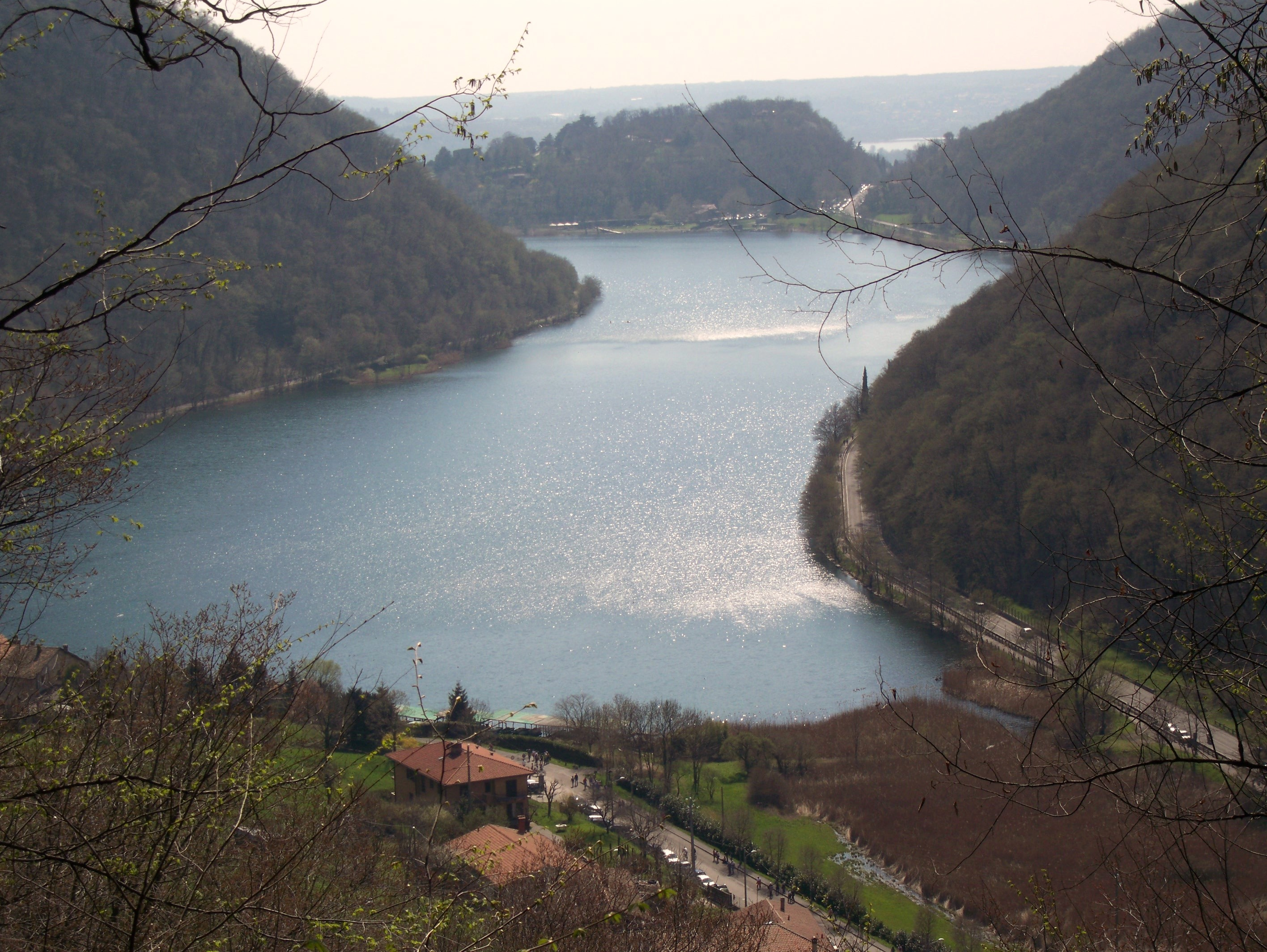
Lago del Segrino from the Budracch path, one of the first places near Canzo that was colonized during the Mesolithic

The first settlements were between Cornizzolo, Mount Raj and Segrino Lake. This site remained inhabited until the 1950s, under the later names of Canza and Sitt di Budracch. The later Celtic and first Roman foundation were transferred to the valley under the Corni di Canzo (Canzo's Horns), formed by the course of the river Ravella.

The ancient town was on the right side of this river. The oldest extant streets are: Lunaa (from a Celtic root meaning "swampland" was nearest to the river); Casargh (probably from Casearium, place for production of cheese and milk-derivatives) was where people lived and Sumbich (summum vicum – the elevated camp) was where the Roman cohorts settled.

The presence of Roman soldiers and their integration within the Insubric/Lepontian (partially Orobic) population is still evidenced by toponyms such as Castelmarte ("the Castle of Mars", the Roman god of war) and Martesana (possibly the root of the cult of St. Michael, as in the lazzaretto near to the springs of the river Valett). Evidence of pre-Roman cults is found at mountain sites, including stones dedicated to propitiatory fertility rites and to female divinities of the waters (see water sprite).

=== 4th to 10th centuries ===
A legend says that the Church of Milan was founded by St. Barnabas. This is commonly rejected by historians (because apparently St. Barnabas never left Cyprus after St. Paul's departure), archaeological proof of a Christian presence in Milan during apostolic times has been found. The conversion of rural areas came after that of the cities: missionaries were sent into the country where they founded religious colleges called pieve that supplied priests and deacons for the countryside.

From the 3rd to the 5th centuries, Christianity was consolidated across Canzo. A church was dedicated to St. Stephen. Another product of this period was widespread veneration of St. Maternus, one of the bishops under whom the area had been converted. During the 3rd century, Bishop Monas organized the diocese.

At this time Canzo probably belonged to Incino's pieve, but later the Curtis Casalensis (or Canzo's Team) confederation was established and retained relative political autonomy throughout the Middle Ages. This pieve or confederation of communes comprised the villages of Caslino, Castelmarte, Proserpio, Eupilio, Longone and some frazioni (hamlets) of the current commune of Erba, with Canzo as its capital.

The Old Town of Canzo preserves the sites of the ancient communal and pieval system: the seat of the governor and of the federal jails were in the street later named Cuntrada dal pretòri; the communal assembly was in a place that gave its name to the Cuntrada dal cuèrc (street of the porch); a fort, later occupied by the Spanish rulers in their first phase, was probably not far from the pretòri, in the street now known as Turèta (little tower street); another tower was on an elevated site looking toward Crann and the little valley in front of it.

The coat of arms of Corte di Casale was similar to others of the zone (such as pieve Vallassina), with diagonal white and red stripes, forming peaks with the top upward and the imperial eagle at the top.

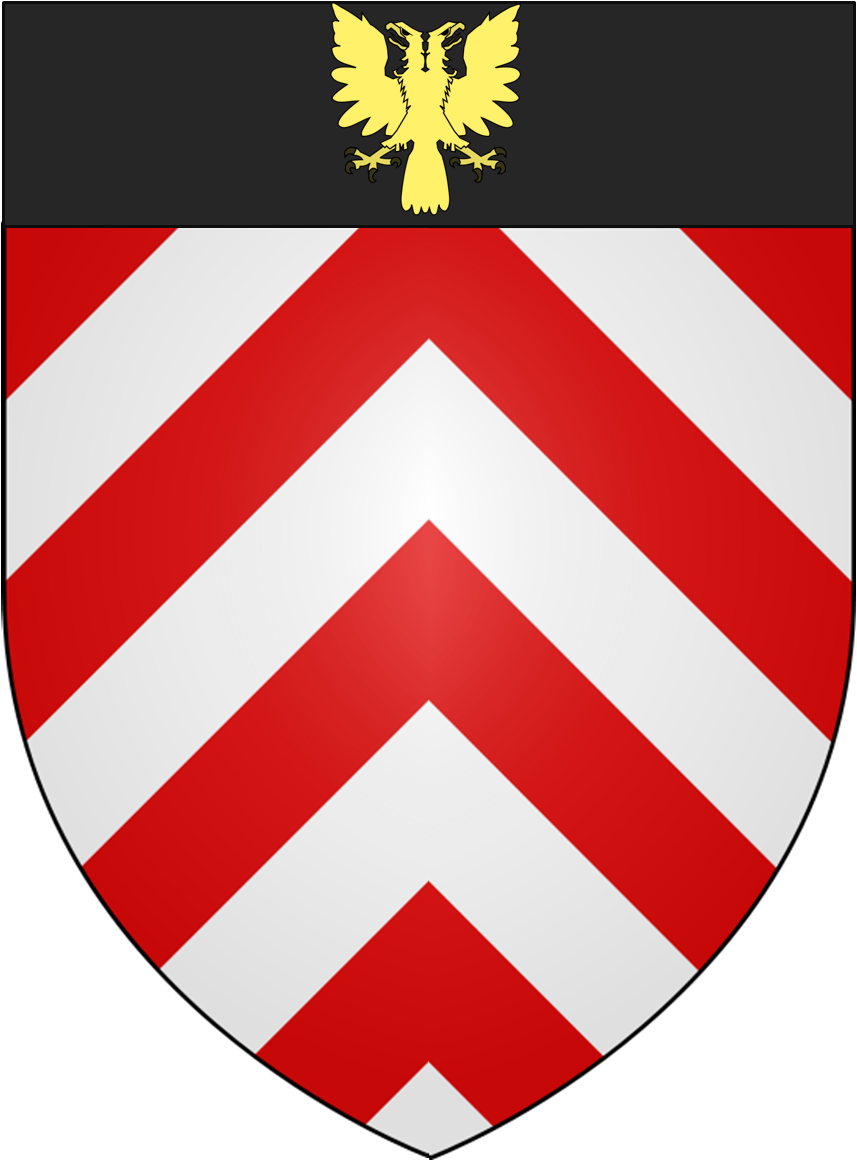
Coat of arms of Corte di Casale, the confederation led by Canzo during the Middle Ages

=== 11th to 14th century ===
During these centuries the rule of Corte di Casale continued. On 27 April 1162, in an act signed in Pavia, Frederick I, Holy Roman Emperor, recognized that the possessions of St. Peter's Abbey (built on the east side of mount Cornizzolo) included some fields in Canzo. Contemporaneous documents attest that other acreages formally belonged to Monza's chapter; one of them was rented by Nicola Prina. Most of the toponyms remained unchanged until modern times, such as Gèpp longh and Ravèl(a). The documents testify to the limitation of the feudal power of the dukes and archbishops of Milan in favour of the communal autonomy of the Corte di Casale, until 1414. This is the reason why this pieve had a different name from the others of western Lombardy: "corte" is the term for a system of families, farms and possessions established from below, rather than a district established by a superior power.

In the 14th century Canzo's history was dominated by the life of the Blessed Mir, a hermit and pilgrim recognized as a saint by the population of Canzo and by those he visited during his travels. He was born in Canzo, in the mountainous frazione of Segunt Alp, to the family of Paredis (meaning relatives), probably a hybrid of Welsh with the local people who settled on Canzo's Horns and still widely present. After the death of his elderly parents, he was educated by an older hermit who lived in the frazione named Scarenna. In Canzo he served as a spiritual father and peacekeeper, living in the mountains near the springs of the River Ravella, where a church was posthumously dedicated to him. He dedicated a long period to a walking pilgrimage in total poverty to Rome, where he is said to have visited the Pope and (possibly) Saint Bridget of Sweden. He then returned to Canzo, passing by the Lomellina region near Pavia, where he worked his first attested miracle, summoning rain by his prayers. He worked the same miracle in Canzo when he started toward the north side of Lake Como (where his mother was born). He died in Sorico, where another church was dedicated to him. He may have belonged to the newborn movement of St. Francis of Assisi.

=== Renaissance and Spanish rule ===
On 7 July 1414, Filippo Maria Visconti, duke of Milan, brought the former Corte di Casale under the temporal jurisdiction of the Archbishop, and it ceased to be an autonomous authority. This happened with the consent of the men of Canzo, who swore fidelity to the legitimate Archbishop, Giovanni Visconti and provided him a refuge after he was forced to flee by a pretender to his office. Thus Canzo became the seat of the Archbishop and his court for at least five years.

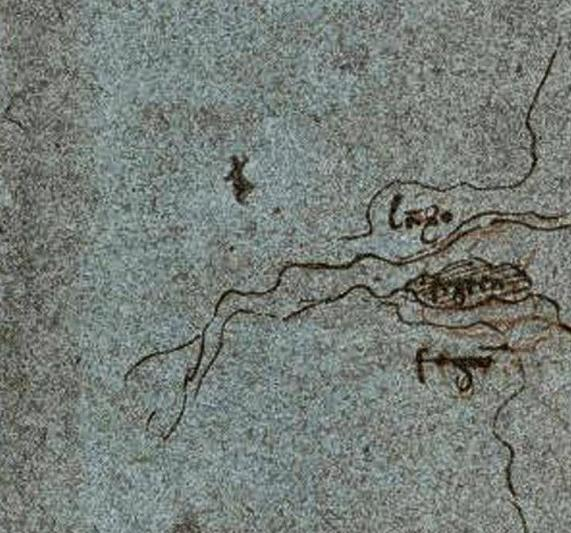
Canzo and Lake Segrino represented in a manuscript by Leonardo da Vinci (mirrored). Notice the mysterious shape of a (flying?) person where Canzo lies.

Canzo's economy had been based on wool weaving, but under its vassalship to the Negronis family, nicknamed "Missaglia", it became the official source of iron for the Duchy of Milan's army, enriching the town. Two schools were established. In this period the commune devised a coat of arms (which had previously used that of the Corte di Casale): a blue field (also found in Prina's coat of arms) with golden stars and hooves for iron transformation, shaped like beehives.

While Leonardo da Vinci was painting The Last Supper in Milan, the artistic wave of the Renaissance was represented in Canzo by wood carver Giovanni da Canzo and his colleagues Giovanni Ambrogio da Longone, Cristoforo da Proserpio and Francesco Vignarca. They were employed in the construction of the pipe organ for the Duomo of Milan. Other wood artists of the former Squadra di Canzo were the Contis from Mariaga and Stefano de Bernardi from Caslino.

The wealth of Lombardy attracted the armies of France and Austria into a lengthy battle there in the late 15th and early 16th century. In this period Niccolò Pelliccione, the Canzese captain of a free company, fought under the sight of Francesco Sforza and Gian Giacomo Medici. In 1526 Canzo was the theatre of a clash between his company and the arquebusiers sent by Antonio de Leyva. After the decisive Battle of Pavia, the Duchy of Milan became a possession of the Habsburgs. Canzo became part of "the empire where the sun never sets" (after the conquest of the Americas). The new rulers did little to improve the economy, instead imposing taxes to support their wars. Spanish soldiers had a base in Canzo. Three tales of rebellion against Spanish rule by Canzo's population have been handed down from this period. One tells about a man who became a hero, Mornerin, whose name is preserved as the name of a street in the Old Town.

=== 18th and 19th centuries ===
Canzo became a centre of iron production for Europe in the 18th and 19th centuries. Thereafter Canzo became an art centre known for its quality of life. In 1728 the construction of the baroque Parochial Basilica started, expanding an existing church. Its realistic wooden crucifix was praised by St. Charles Borromeo of Milan during his pastoral visit. The church displayed marble confessionals, three monumental marble statues by Elia Vincenzo Buzzi (an artist of the Duomo of Milan), a triumphal arch and frescos representing the Trinity, St. Stephen and the four evangelists. It also had three portals, two pulpits, two sacristies, many marble balusters and several reliquary busts. In the 19th century it was enriched by its pipe organ (1828) provided by Serassi from Bergamo and by the mural pictures of David Beghè. On 21 April, the pope enlarged the titles granted to the parish, giving its vicars the titles of provost and monsignore and encouraging the Archbishop of Milan, Andrea Carlo Ferrari, to revive Corte di Casale's rule in matters of ecclesiastical administration. Two important painters of the later 19th century, Carlo Gerosa and Giovanni Segantini, lived and worked in Canzo. Artistic chapels and monumental graves of the 18th and 19th century are visible in the cemetery. Poets and writers like Alessandro Manzoni and Carlo Porta were inspired by this place during visits to their friends' villas.

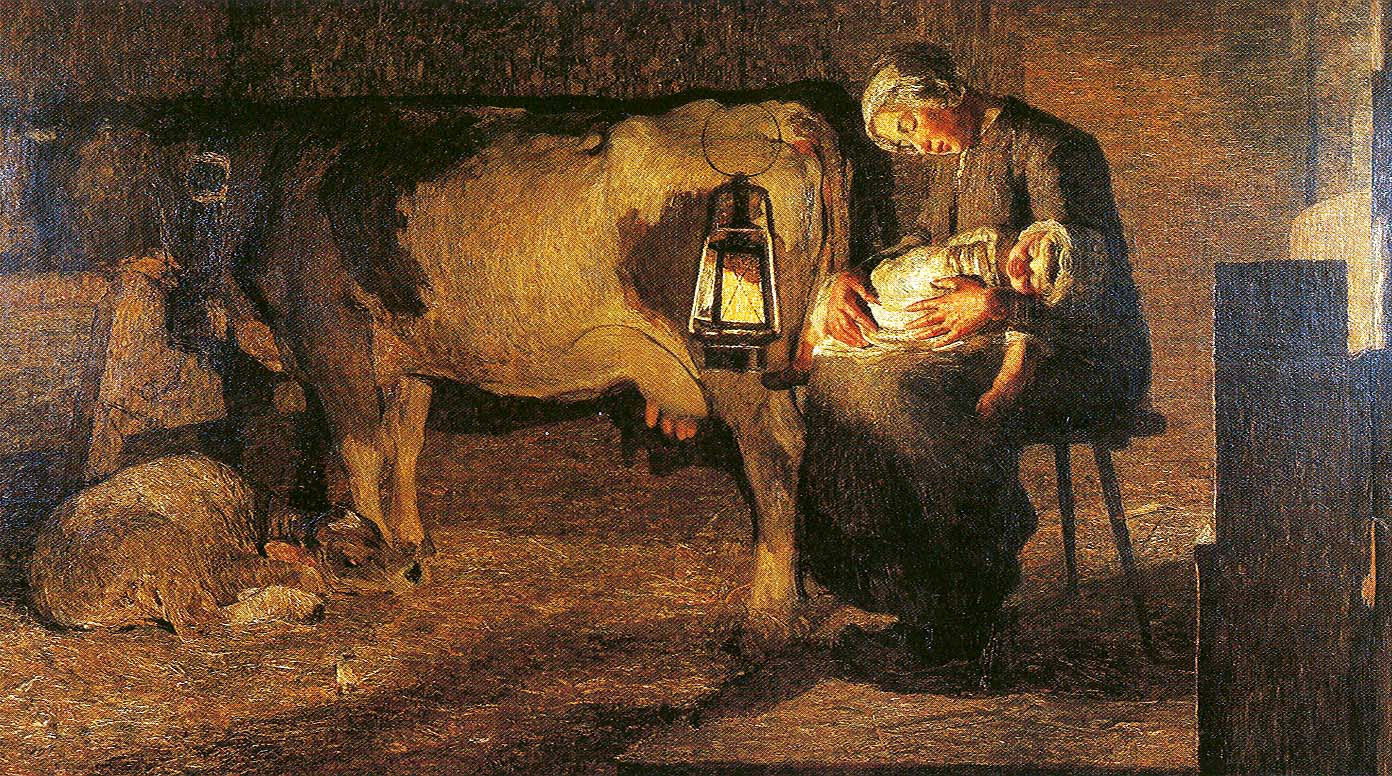
"The two mothers", painting by Giovanni Segantini, made within the boundaries of Canzo during his residence

Canzo became one of the major sites of silk production in the Western world, led by the Marques Crivelli. Spinning mills belonging to the Gavazzi and especially the Verza families were central to this development. Entire families moved there from Brescia and Veneto as manpower for these factories, receiving an education in the small workers' city created by Giuseppe and Alessandro Verza.

In the 19th century the Vallassinese Bank arose from the capital of the Prina family and silk worker Magno Magni who pioneered the Italian chemical industry. In Vicenza he founded the society that later invented commercial plastics.

The strong moral ideas of Giuseppe Parini, educated in this district, encouraged economist Verri to explain the laws of supply and demand and elaborate the system of modern revenue service, later adopted across the globe. He was a precursor of both Adam Smith and marginalism. Philosopher Beccaria published his theory about "punishment as reeducation", proposing the abolition of capital punishment. The linguistic work of Manzoni and the syndical/political work of Filippo Turati, born in Canzo in 1857, contributed to the moral unification of Italy that followed the 1861 political change. Many Canzese soldiers participated in the unification under the orders of Giuseppe Garibaldi. During the 1848 revolution against Austria, Duroni, a patriot from Canzo, was the first to hoist the Italian flag on the highest spire of the Duomo di Milano.

=== 20th and 21st centuries ===
In 1904, deputy Filippo Turati's party's support in Parliament to Giovanni Giolitti's Italian Government led to the approval of important innovations: laws for the protection of female and young workers, on work accidents, illness, old age, data collection/analysis and acceptance of cooperative societies. In 1915, Italy entered the World War I in alliance with France and Great Britain, reconquering the Italian territories of Trentino and Friuli, then occupied by the Austro-Hungarian empire. Many Canzeses died and a monument to them was built in Garibaldi square. Patriotism was strong just after the war. In 1924 veterans' club Gruppo Alpini Canzo was founded, serving as a major cultural, recreational and social feature. It is also involved in ministering to the natural environment.

The autarky stimulated the creation of many urban vegetable gardens in Canzo. After Mussolini's alliance with Hitler, Italy enacted race laws, but the population of Canzo, like those of many other Italian cities, acted to protect their Jewish neighbors. Orlando Prina, official of the Alpini, served in the Greek campaign, then returned to Canzo after the armistice. He worked clandestinely in the Resistance against German occupation, in spite of the presence of two headquarters of SS corps. After the Nazi's retreat he organized the new Commune, providing for displaced persons (sfollati) bombed out of their homes. The Canzese welcomed those searching for refuge. A moral example was given by parish priest don Pozzoli, when he assisted deserters destined for execution just a few days before Liberation.

After the war, the educated class of Canzo restored its quality of life, adding infrastructure and restarting production. Despite a national battle between Catholics and Marxists, in Canzo moderate and peaceful freedom of thought was maintained, together with honest collaboration in social matters. The population grew and its density increased, so new districts and houses were built, especially in the plain of the River Ravella, in the areas known as Parisùn and Gerètt. New enterprises were opened, such as the Porroni stone carving company (which created the capitals for Como's Portici Plinio), and manufacturing industries, such as iron scissors. Canzo became Italy's centre of this kind of production together with the nearby village of Premana. Every street had at least one scissor maker.

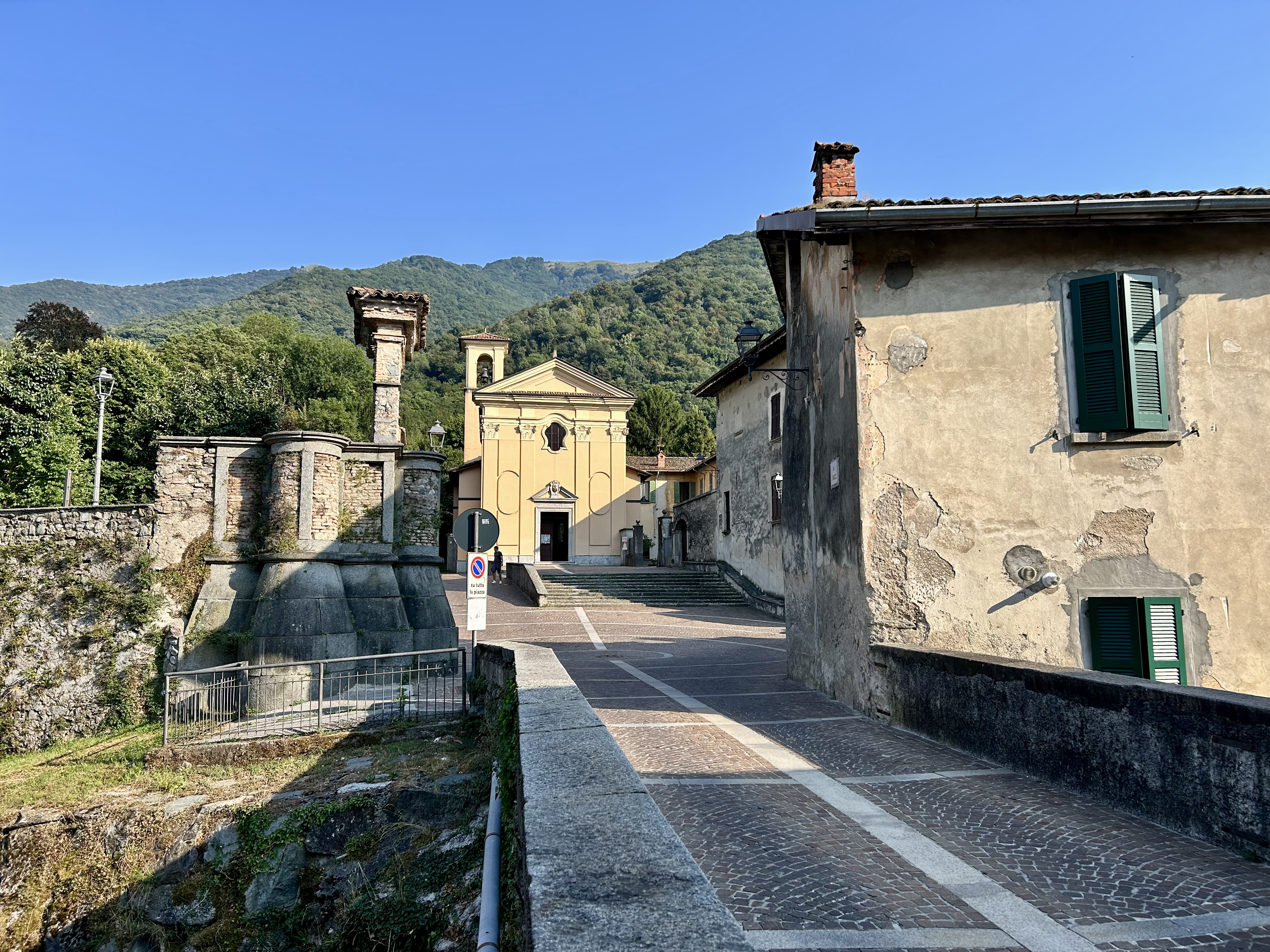
Chiesa di San Francesco

At the same time sensibility to nature grew. In particular, Lake Segrino was protected by ceasing an international water skiing competition, at the expense of immediate financial advantage.

In the last quarter of the century Canzo became a centre for organic farming. In 1984 the first example of what would become the BIOFERA began. In 1987, the oldest of Italy's three major "organic festivals" launched.

Historic buildings were restored, including St. Francis church, St. Mir's hermitage and Villa Meda. A new chapel was built by the Hunters' Association near the site of the hamlet where Blessed Mir was born.

In the 2000s the Alpini founded a polyphonic chorus, and a solidarity fund was established for people touched by the international financial crisis.

== Geography ==
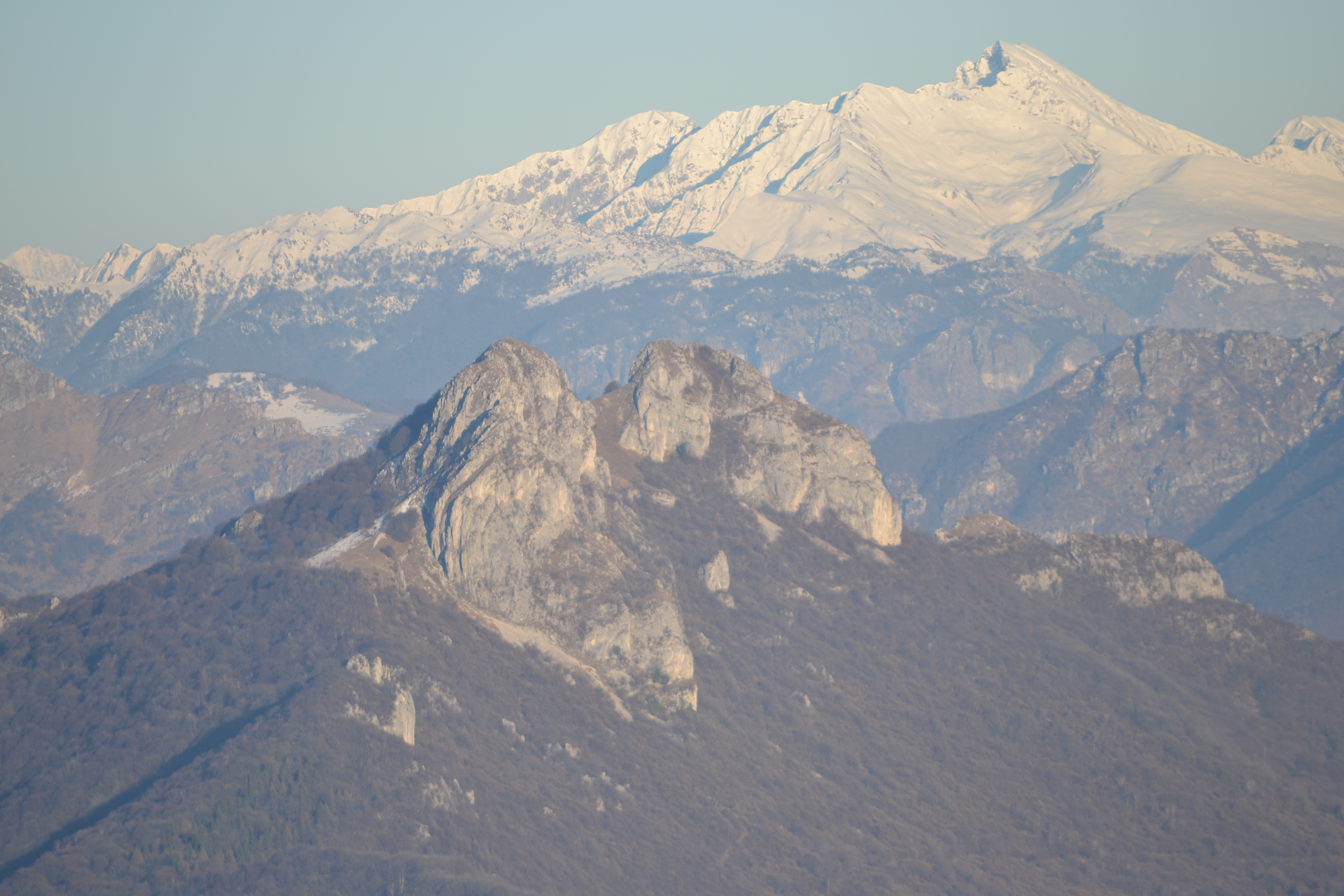
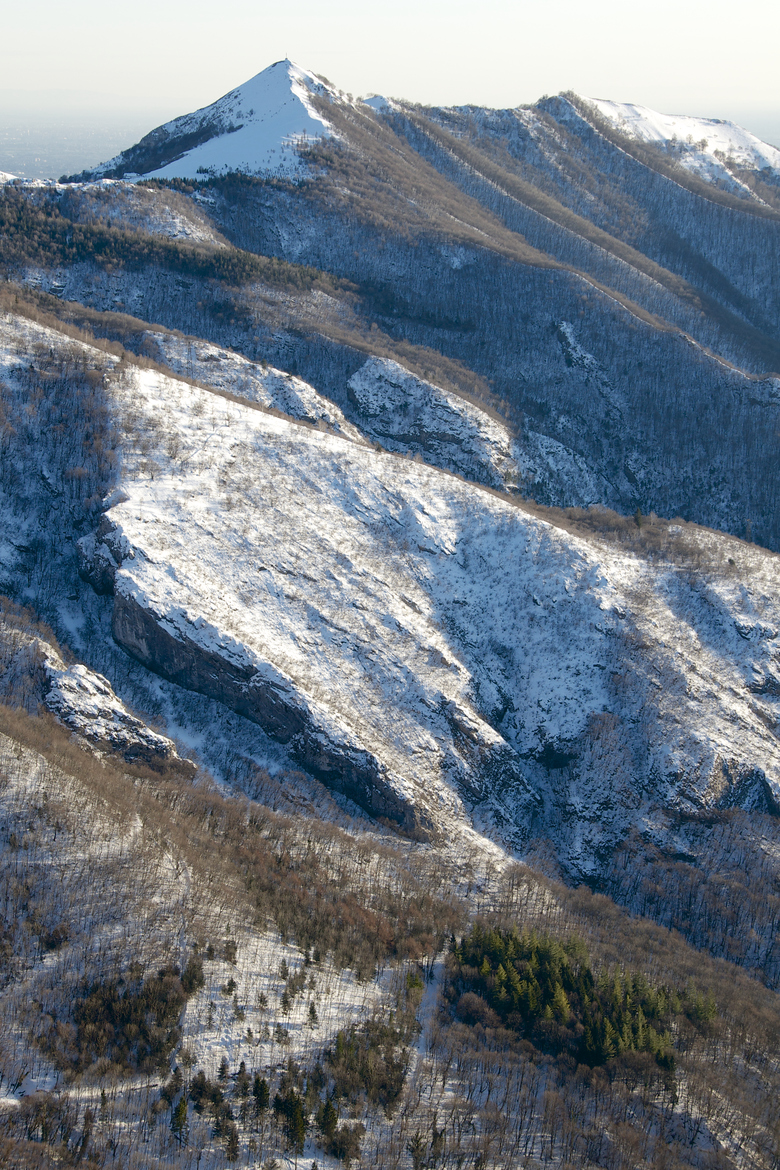
Left: sight of Corni di Canzo from mount Bollettone; and panoramic view of the valley where Canzo is collocated. Right: nature reserve in Canzo, between Canzo's Horns, Mount Raj and Mount Cornizzolo.

=== Topography ===
The borough of Canzo is situated in front of the Valassina valley, beginning at the foot of the Corni di Canzo mountain, so called (Corni meaning Horns) for its crest, as bifurcate and rocky, ash-grey, in the shape and color of two horns. After the plain of Erba, Canzo is at the confluence of the two small valleys formed by Mount Barzaghino, Mount Scioscia and Mount Cornizzolo. The first is the site of Lake Segrino, formed by glacial movements. The second hosts the town of Caslino. An intermittent spring rises from the side of Corni di Canzo and flows into the river Lambro, whose waters flow south to the Brianza region, pass Milan and reach the Po River. Elevations range from 360 to 1,371 m above sea level.

Geographically, Canzo is roughly the centre of the Larian peninsula (or Lake Como Triangle). The land lies between the two ramifications of Lake Como. One leads to Como and one goes straight south and, within the boundaries of Lecco, transforms itself into the second part of the Adda River. The third side of the triangle consists of many small lakes, of which Lake Segrino is smallest. The mountains of the triangle are pre-Alpine, topped by Mount San Primo at 1,686 m.

The classification of the Larian peninsula's mountain range is: Western Alps > North-Western Alps > Lugano Pre-Alps > Como Pre-Alps > Larian Triangle. The chain is divided into three groups: the Mount Palanzone group; Mount San Primo's massif (with sub-group Oriolo) and the Corni group, comprising the Corni di Canzo (with the surrounding mountains) and the sub-group of Mount Barro and Mount Crocione (situated over the boundaries of the Larian peninsula). Other mountains are Mount Bollettone, Mount Moregallo, Pizzo dell'Asino, Mount Raj, Mount Boletto, Punta Tre Termini and Mount Broncino.

The terrain is mainly composed of limestone strata, rich in caves and caverns, the most famous of which is the "Lead Hole" (Bus del Piomb, Buco del Piombo in Italian). A particular characteristic of this area is the presence of isolated erratic boulders, pushed down by glaciers that in prehistory occupied the Valmasino and Valmalenco valleys. Some were excavated by the primitive population to make tombs ("massi avelli").

=== Climate ===
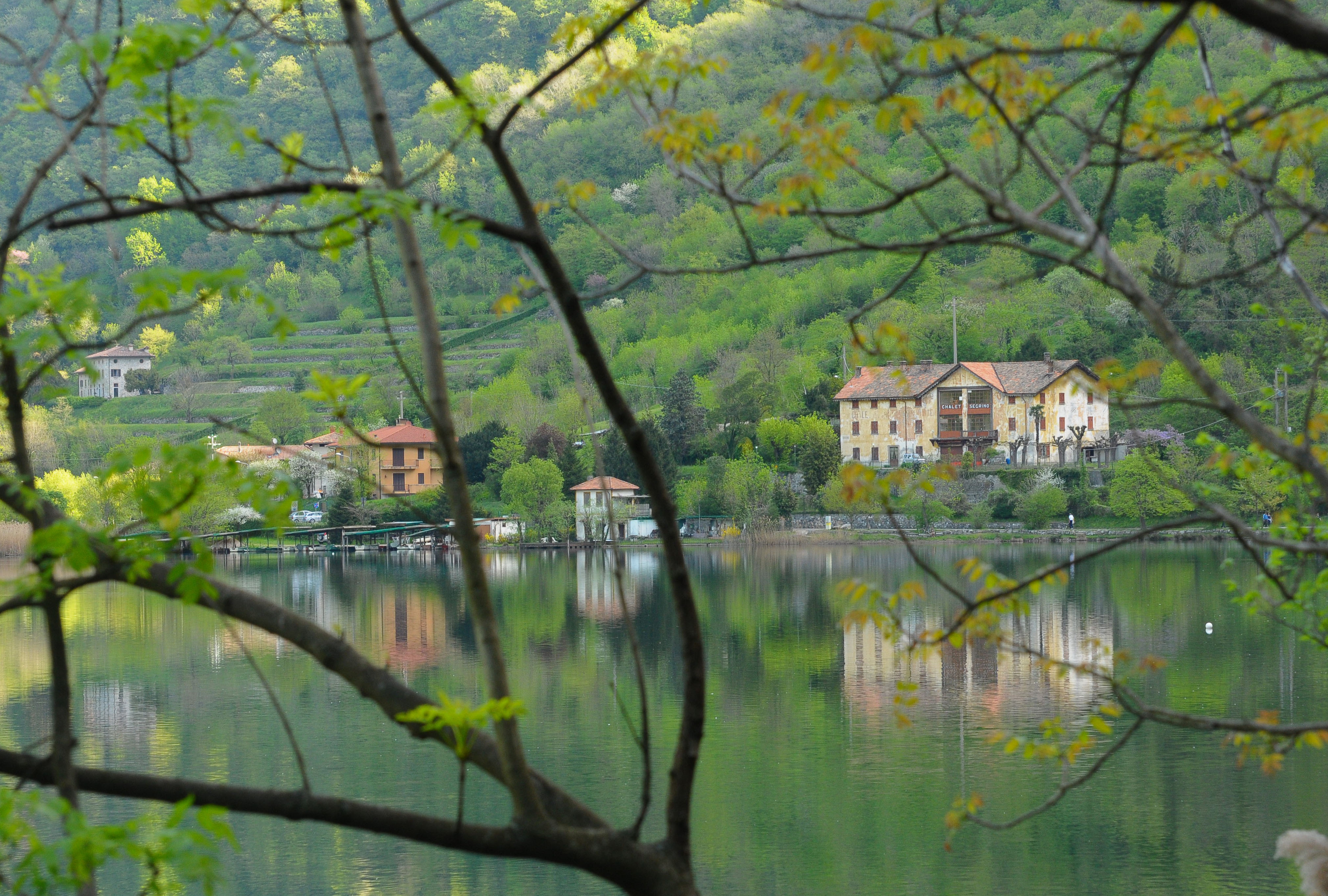
Lake Segrino has a role in moderating hot temperatures in summer and in tempering cold ones during winter.

Canzo lies on a boundary between three climatic typologies: continental climate of Brianza, alpine climate produced by the presence of mountains over 1,500 m, and Mediterranean climate of Lake Como.

Rains are abundant, exceeding 2 m a year. The rainfall is caused by the Stau effect that occurs within depressions, causing strong southern winds and forcing air to rise along the slopes of mountains and to release its humidity as precipitation. During the winter precipitation often falls as snow. Winter is a relatively drier season, while the other three seasons have a uniformly high humidity, with the exception of the dry month of July. Fog may appear for a few days a year.

The most frequent winds are from the West. During the spring and autumn, southern winds are responsible for massive precipitation. During winter, winds from the north or east bring dry and cold days; sometimes their interaction with wet tepid masses from the Atlantic or Mediterranean creates the conditions for heavy snowfall. Foehn is a fall or winter wind that can provoke sudden higher temperature. The main local winds are: Breva dal Segrin (from the south), Breva da Caslin (from the west), Vent dal Sant Prim (from the north), and Ariasc di Alp (from the east).

Summer is warm, with temperatures around 30 °C. Winters are cold on the whole, and by night the temperature goes below 0 °C, but the protective effect of surrounding mountains and the mitigating effect of Lake Como make the winter cold less severe, with temperatures only a few degrees below 0. During spring and autumn temperatures vary suddenly, but generally are moderate.

The flora is composed of oaks, chestnut trees, ironwoods, alders, elms, maples, spruce and firs, with a particularly rich underbrush: strawberries, blueberries and mushrooms. Veronica is relatively warm and suitable for cultivation of grapevines.

=== Lake and rivers ===
==== Lake Segrino ====
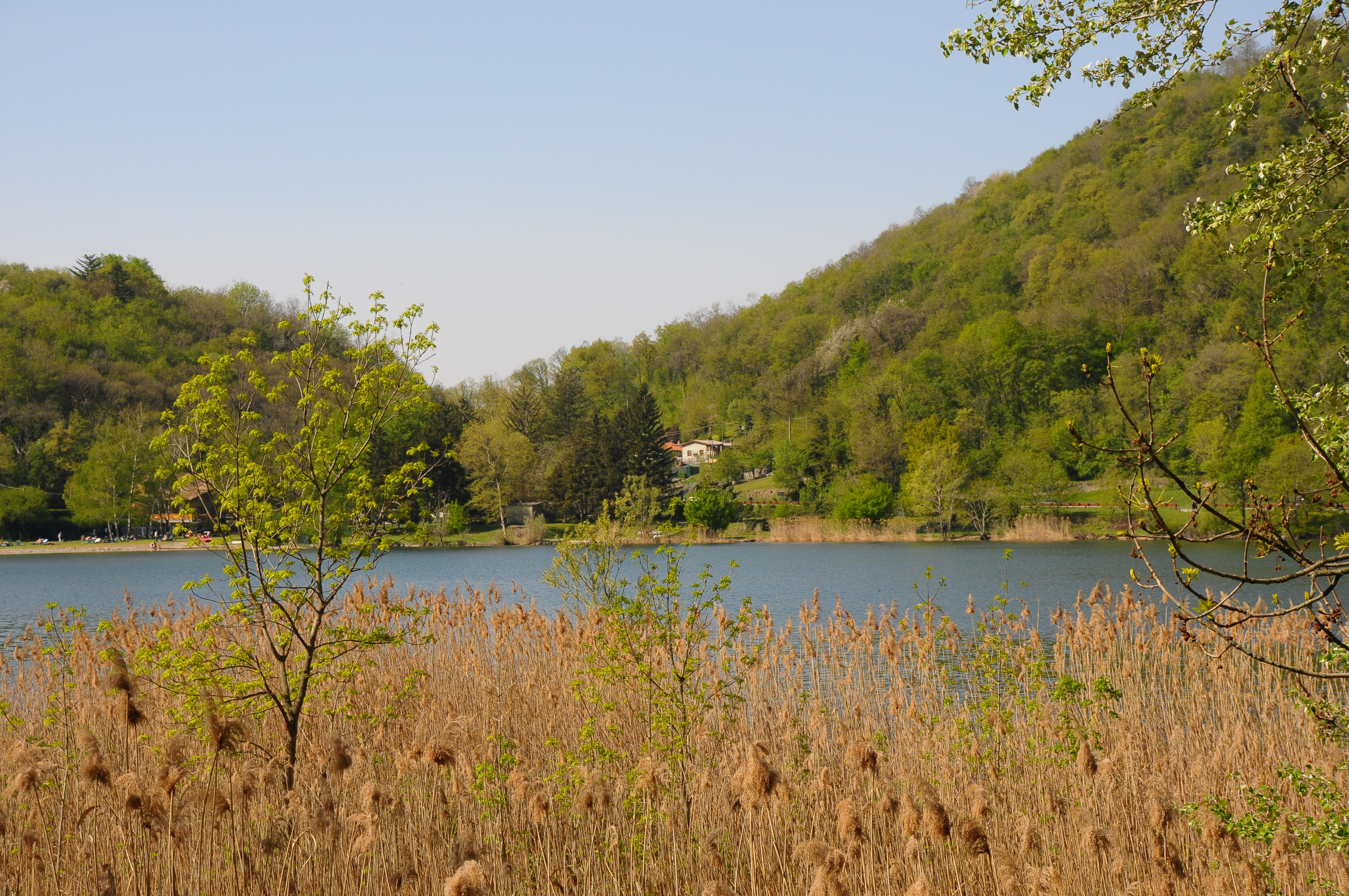
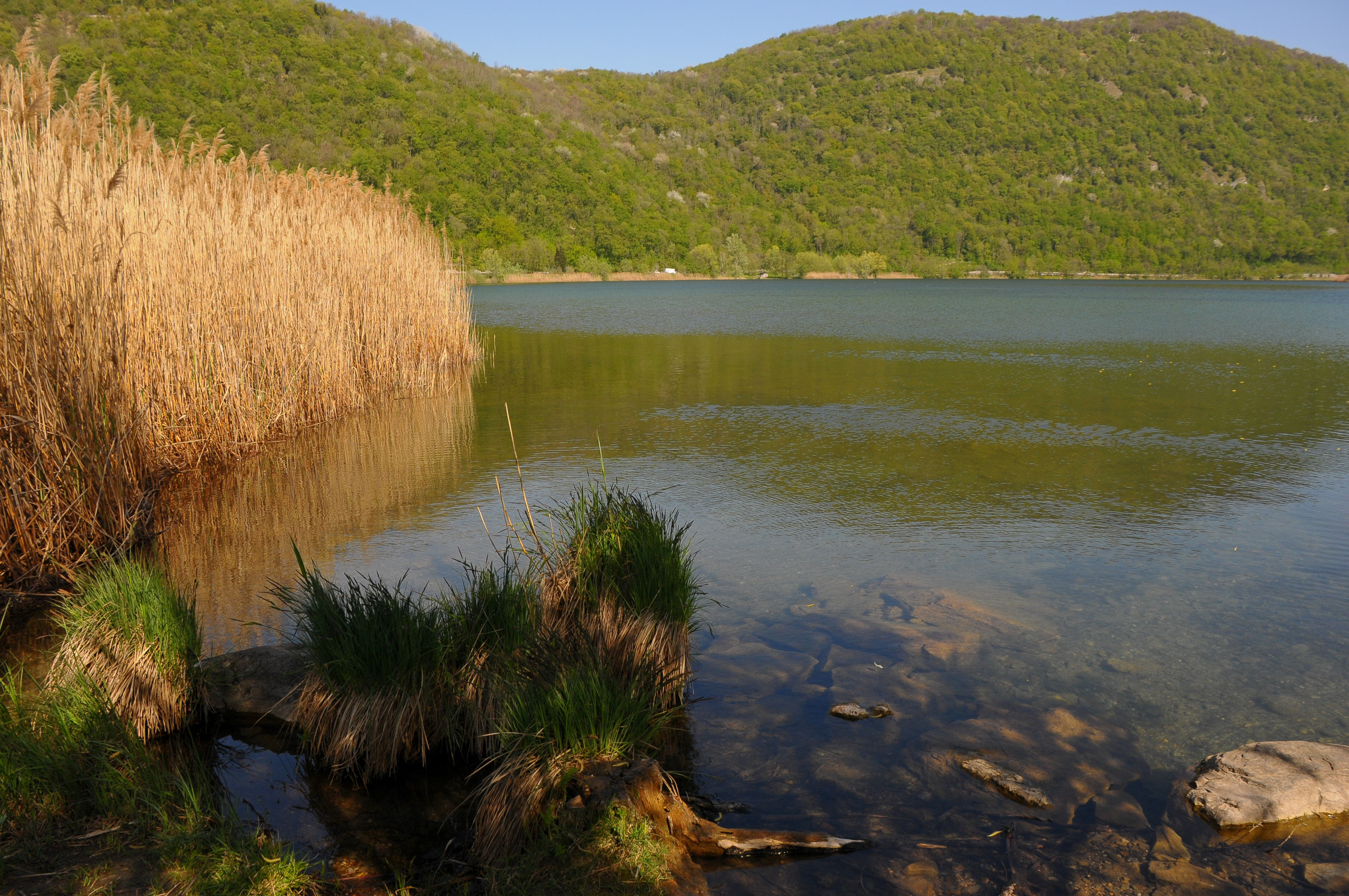
Lake Segrino shores with reed thickets

The rocks of Lake Segrino are calcareous, produced by the gradual solidification of an ancient seabed. Afterwards, with the continents' geological motion and with the push of Africa against the European plate, the rocks were raised into mountains. "Flutes" are signs of the channels of sediment flow that formed these rocks. Lake Segrino was appreciated by Leonardo da Vinci, and by the Italian writers Ippolito Nievo and Antonio Fogazzaro, who set some of their romances there. At the bridge called Punt d'Inach, the habitat is rich in plant and animal species. In June and August waterlilies bloom on the surface and a community of reed-maces diffuses on the shores. In a place called Schiuntina, on the eastern side of the lake, water birds such as coots, gallinules, wild ducks, herons, night herons, cannareccione, dunnocks, nightingales and bitterns live. Emis orbicularis is the indigenous green turtle. Myriophylla in the deeper water offer food for birds and a nesting site for perch, jackfish, rudd, savettas, tench, carp and eel. In late summer, myriophylla bloom on the surface. The shelter in the middle of the road offers a panoramic view of the lake's western part. This lake is one of the few habitats of the Lataste frog (protected by the EU and UN). The former presence of the sea is revealed by fossils of radiolarians and ammonites. The Fons Sacer, or sacred spring, the main underground source of Lake Segrino's water, gave its name to the entire lake. In this part of the lake common toads nest, and grebes (or loons) swim with their joeys and nightingales sing. In the air are kestrels (or windhovers), hawks and buzzards and eagles. This lake is the clearest and least polluted lake in Europe, due to the absence of influent rivers and the advanced plant-based purification system installed on the northern side. The north end of the lake is marked by the Roman milestone, on which a two sided niche has been constructed, a memorial of the time (in the early 19th century, during the so-called Little Ice Age) when a carter fell asleep and his oxen carried his wagon, loaded with stone, onto the ice-covered lake, but the ice did not break.

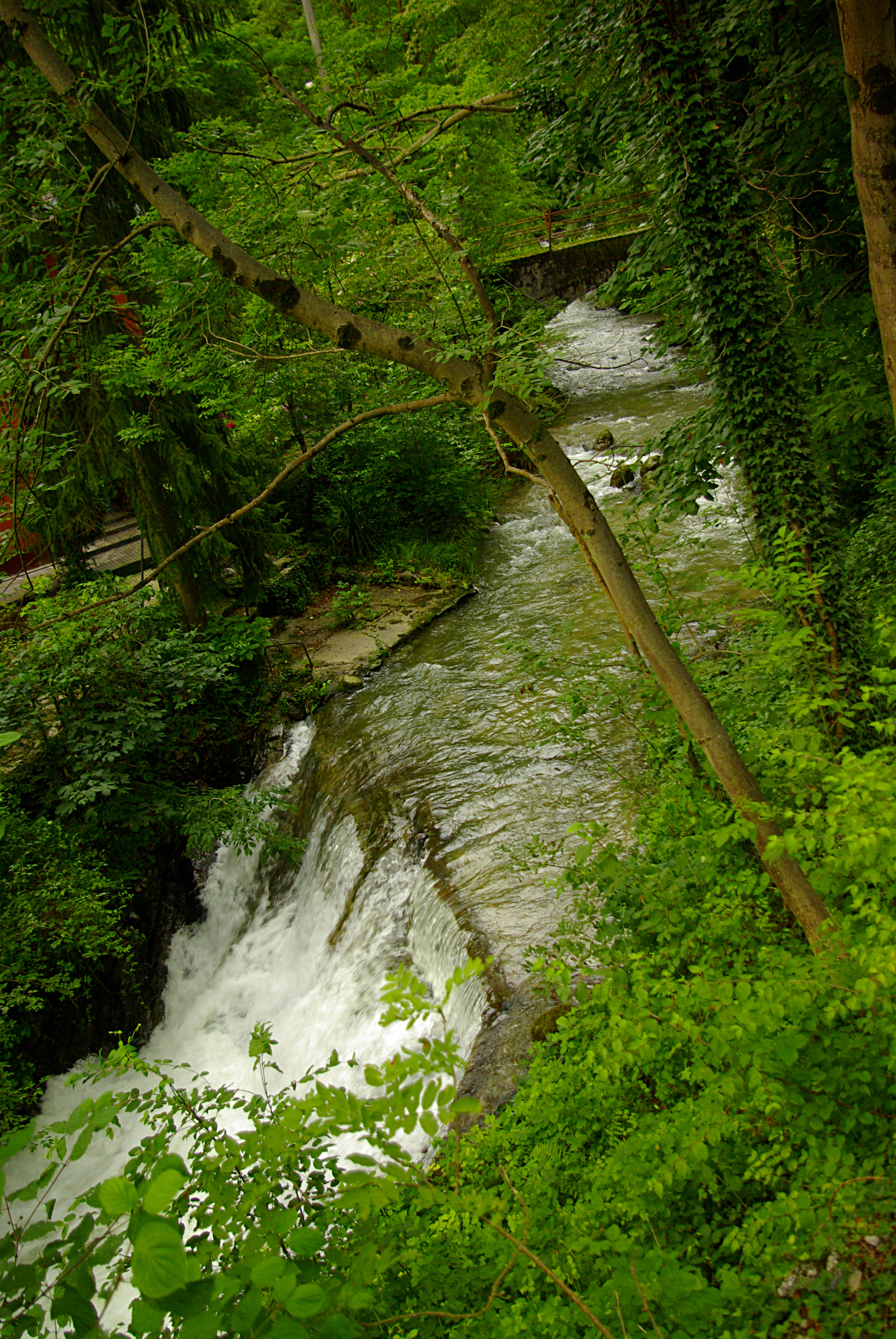
The River Ravella, a mountain stream ideal for climbing and for geological excursions, photographed not far from Gajum springs

==== River Lambro and River Ravella ====
The River Lambro rises in the mountains of the Mt. San Primo group, not far from Madonna del Ghisallo. The springs are karstic and their name Menaresta means "flows and stops". They rise from a particular stone siphon, situated underground in calcareous rock. Every eight minutes, as observed by Pliny the Elder, the water fills the siphon and then flows out, producing an intermittent stream for the village of Magreglio.

The first affluent of Lambro is called Lambretto (coming from Crezzo). It enters Lambro by the village of Lasnigo. It then runs faster and "cuts" the Vallassina valley, leading to Asso, where it drives three old flour mills. The Vallassina ends when it receives the flow of the River Foce (coming from Valbrona), which descends in an unexpected waterfall that also marks the beginning of the commune of Canzo.

In Canzo the peripheral course of the River Lambro is an important source of irrigation for the Canzese plain frazione of Terra Rossa and for the Canzese part of Scarenna, extending to the edge of Caslino. In Canzo, as in many boroughs of Brianza, the word Lambar became a synonym of "river". Its clarity is proverbial. "Clear as Lambro" is a common saying. Its waters are relatively fresh and constant, compared with those of Ravella.

Ravella is a stream from the southern side of the Corni di Canzo, at about 1,000 m altitude, on the lower edge of Colma dei Corni, where glacial clay crops out from under a mantle of alluvial sediment. It flows down into the Old Town of Canzo. Its basin, lengthened in an east-west direction, is bounded by Cranno's crest, Colletta, Corni, Colma dei Corni (north), and by Maschèrpa and Mt. Prasanto (east). To the south, the basin of Ravella includes parts of Mount Raj, Mount Cornizzolo and Pesora. Its affluents are the small rivers of St. Mir and of Valett, the last flowing down from Pesora and entering Ravella not far from St. Francis' church, passing between the convent's lands and the curt di Sant, flowing under an ancient bridge and entering Ravella between the former Prina and Arcellazzi palaces. The River Ravella, in its upper course, often flows through steep limestone canyons, resulting in small waterfalls and with characteristic "giants' mufflers", produced by the action of glaciers, parallel to the anticline and syncline folds forming the structure of the Lombard pre-Alps.

The environment is completely wild as far as Gajum, and is made up of coppices; the quality of its waters is demonstrated by the presence of stream trout, sometimes also visible under the town bridges in Canzo. The view of the river valley is dominated by the promontory named Cepp da l'Angua or Scalfìn dal diaul, in the shape of an enormous heel, while on the right side you can see, although covered by vegetation, the terraces of the moraines, where Prim Alp, Segunt Alp and Terz Alp are built. A geological nature trail traces the valley, whose attractions are the green rocks ("massi erratici") of serpentite and serizz. After passing the town, the River Ravella flows through the plain of Lambro, and in the frazione of Castelmarte, also called Ravella, it flows into the Lambro River.

==== Gajum Springs ====
The springs of Gajum at 485 m are a source of quality drinking water, in the past bottled by a local cooperative. Their water is distributed freely to the local population from one fountain, near to the source . The springs have been a famous resort for excursionists since the 19th century. Tables and chairs were carved from rocks, built by early tourists. In the woods above the source an ancient chapel is dedicated to Our Lady of Sorrows (Madòna di Sètt Duluur). The springs are at the crossroads of the Alp path and St. Mir's path. Their name comes from the local Lombard word gaumm /ga'ym/ (from Celtic ga-, womb), meaning "husk, walnut husk or hull", because a walnut tree overlooked the main fountain. Its nuts fell into the basin of water, floating on it and when ripe, coloring it black. The water attracts people from southern Brianza and the Province of Milan to take quantities home with them. Gajum subsoil is the main reference for the chronology of Toarcian age worldwide.

== Townscape ==
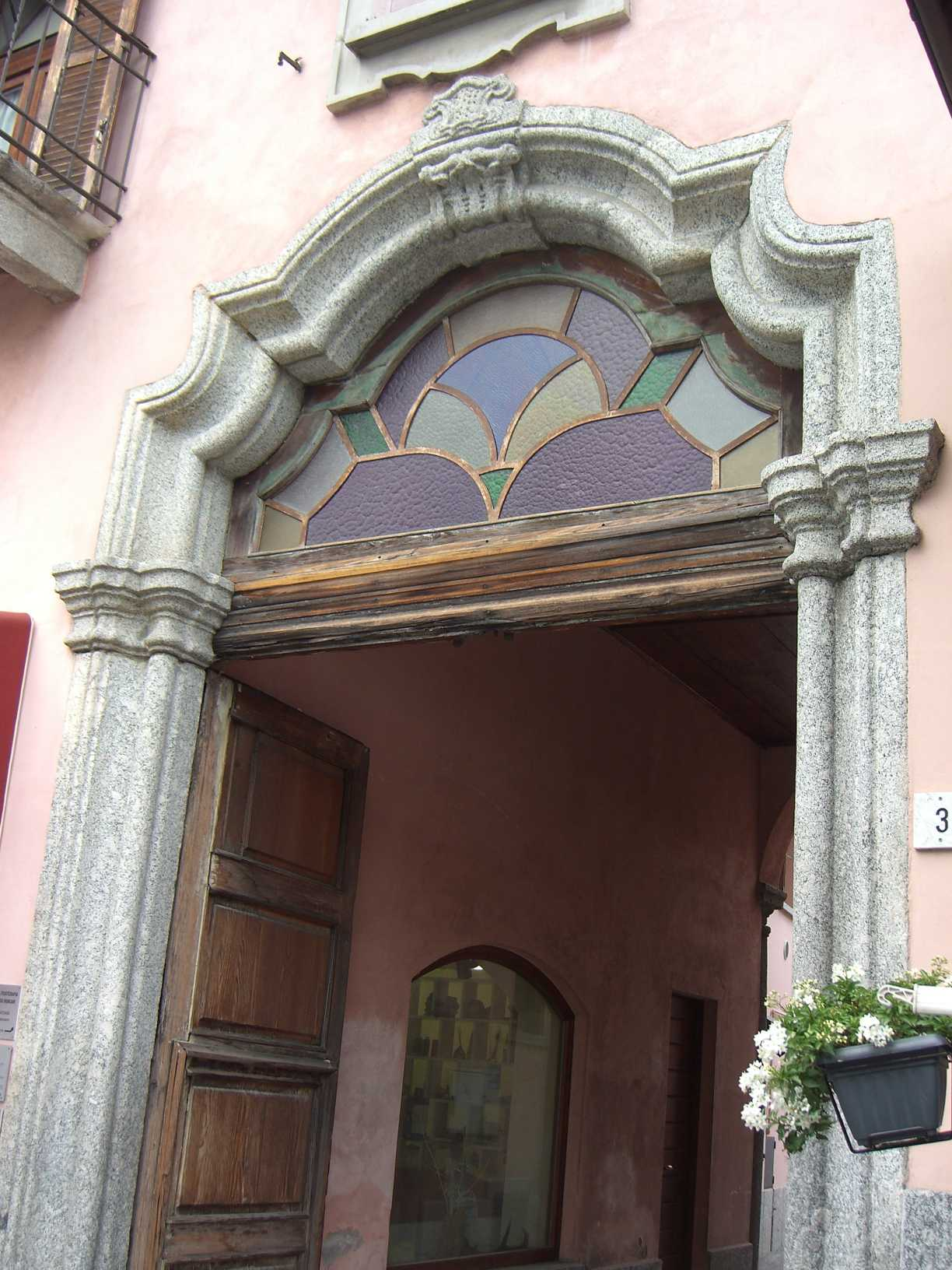
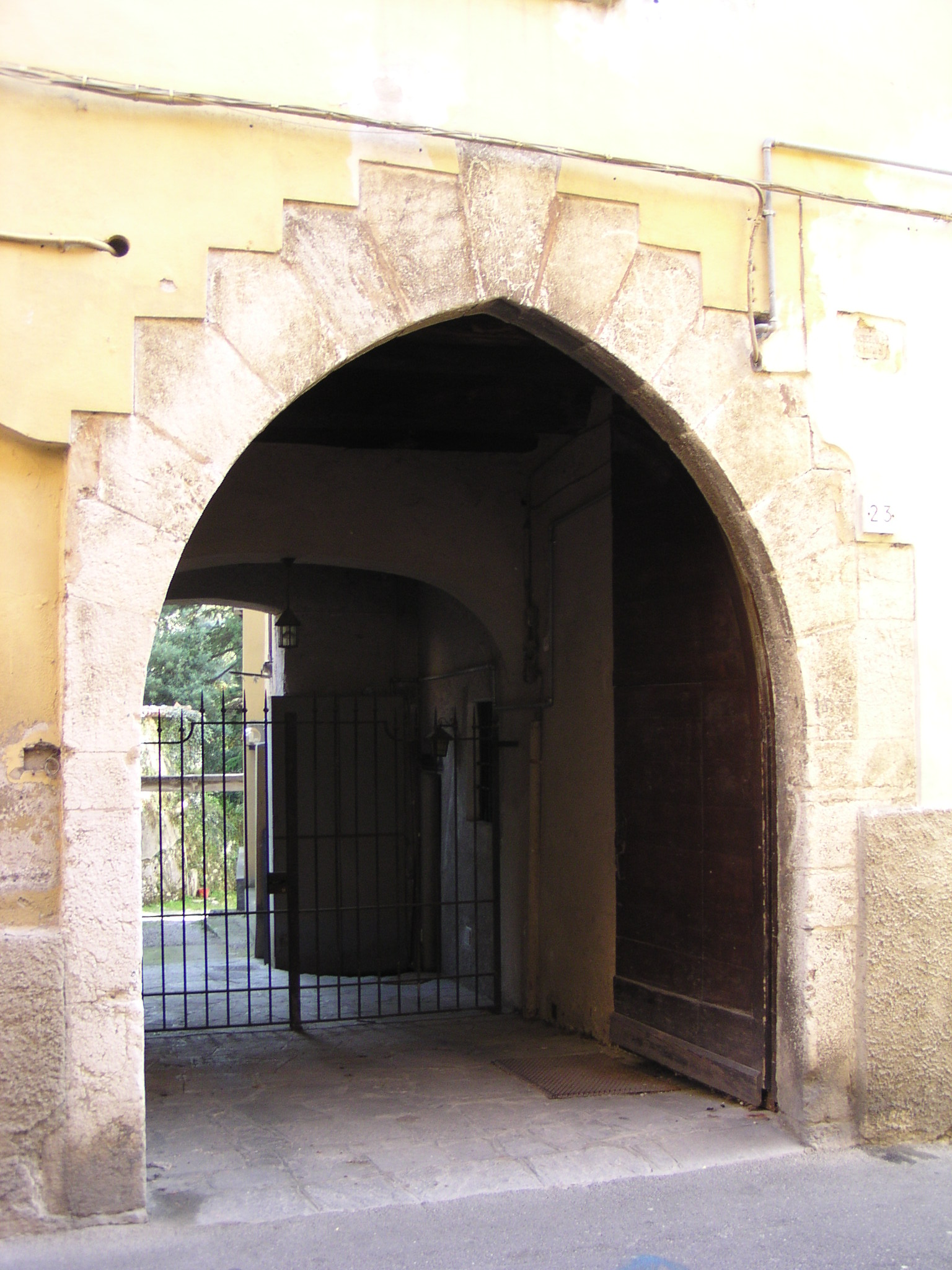
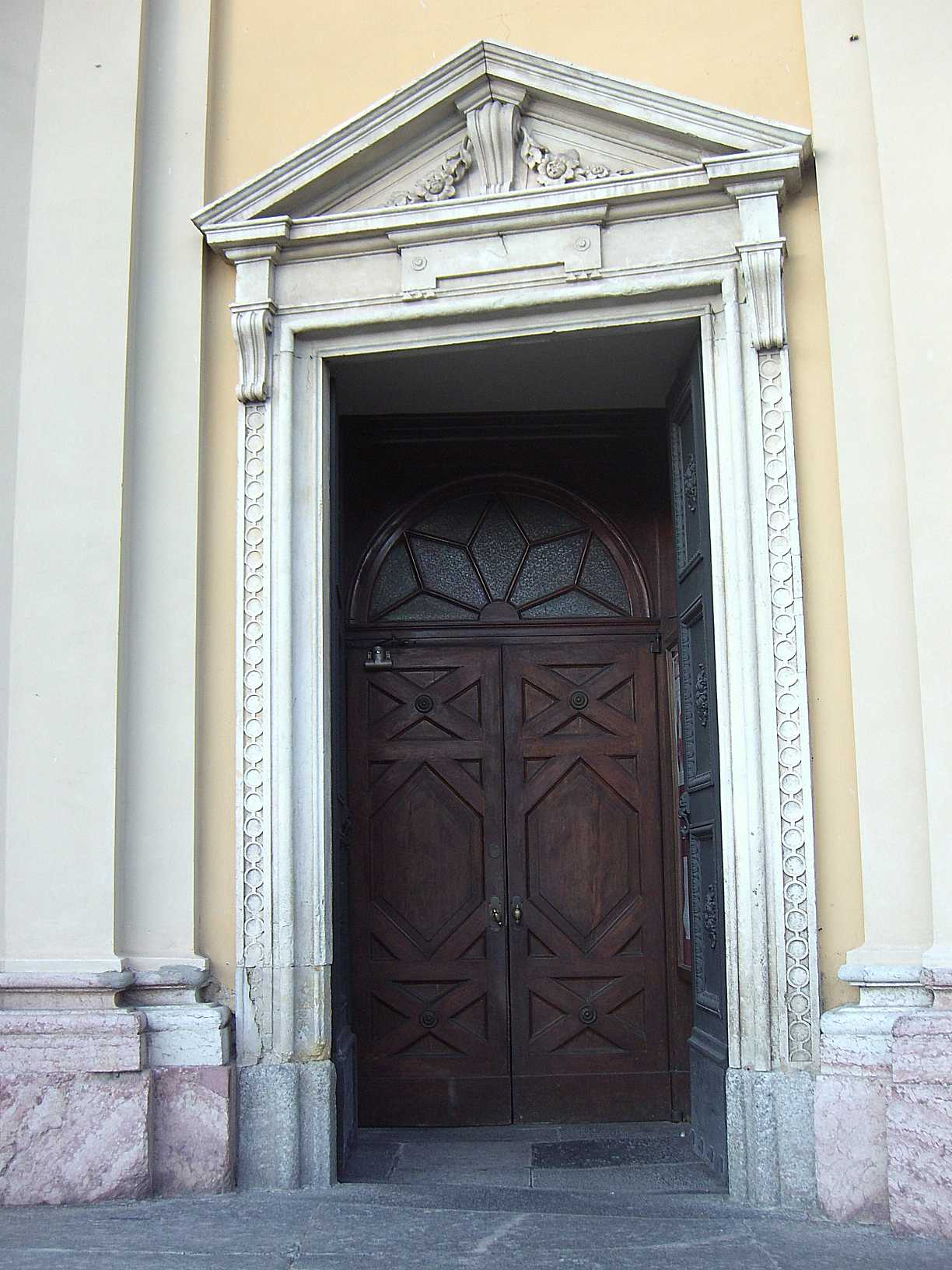
Left: a Barocchetto-style courtyard door in Garibaldi square. Centre: a Medieval door of a noble's courtyard in Cuèrc street (Senate street), in the Old Town. Right: one of the two lateral portals of St. Stephen's parish church, in the centre of Canzo.

=== Architecture ===
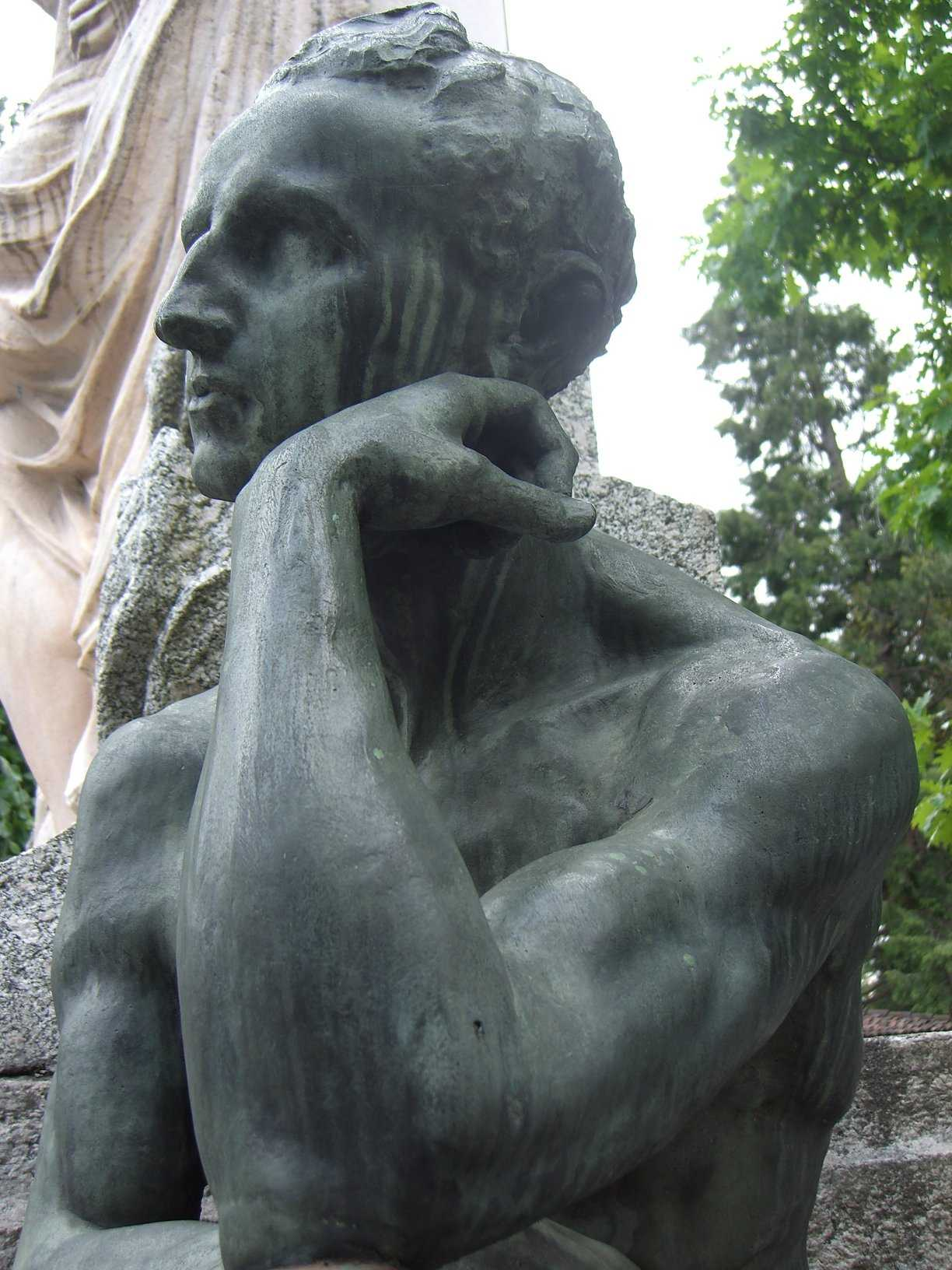
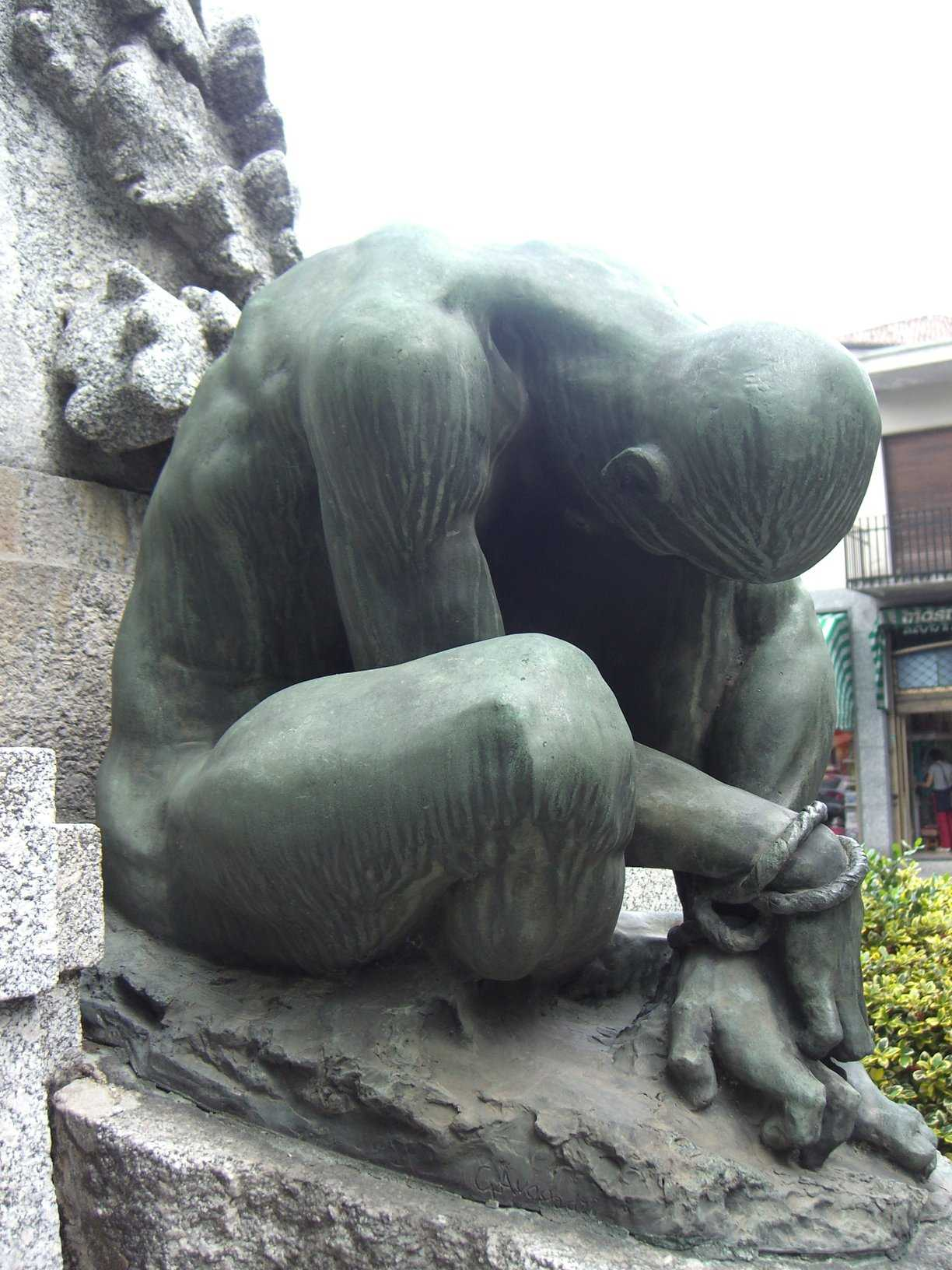
Bronze statues at the Monuments to the Canzese fallen in World War I

Villa Meda is composed of two neoclassical courtyards. St. Francis square features buildings from many architectural periods, particularly the Baroque church, the curt da Pinòla (a medieval poor courtyard), and the ramparts and arch of Villa Meda.

The chapel of St. Stephen's church hosts relics and a Renaissance crucifix.

The area has two war memorials. City Hall was designed as a modern Broletto with a massive freestone civil clock tower linked to the ancient Palazzo Tentorio and its park. Old Town is formed by streets called cuntrada, of different ages. Structures feature a variety of portals and other particulars such as mullioned windows, ogives, ribbings, tower-shaped garrets and the Old Theatre.

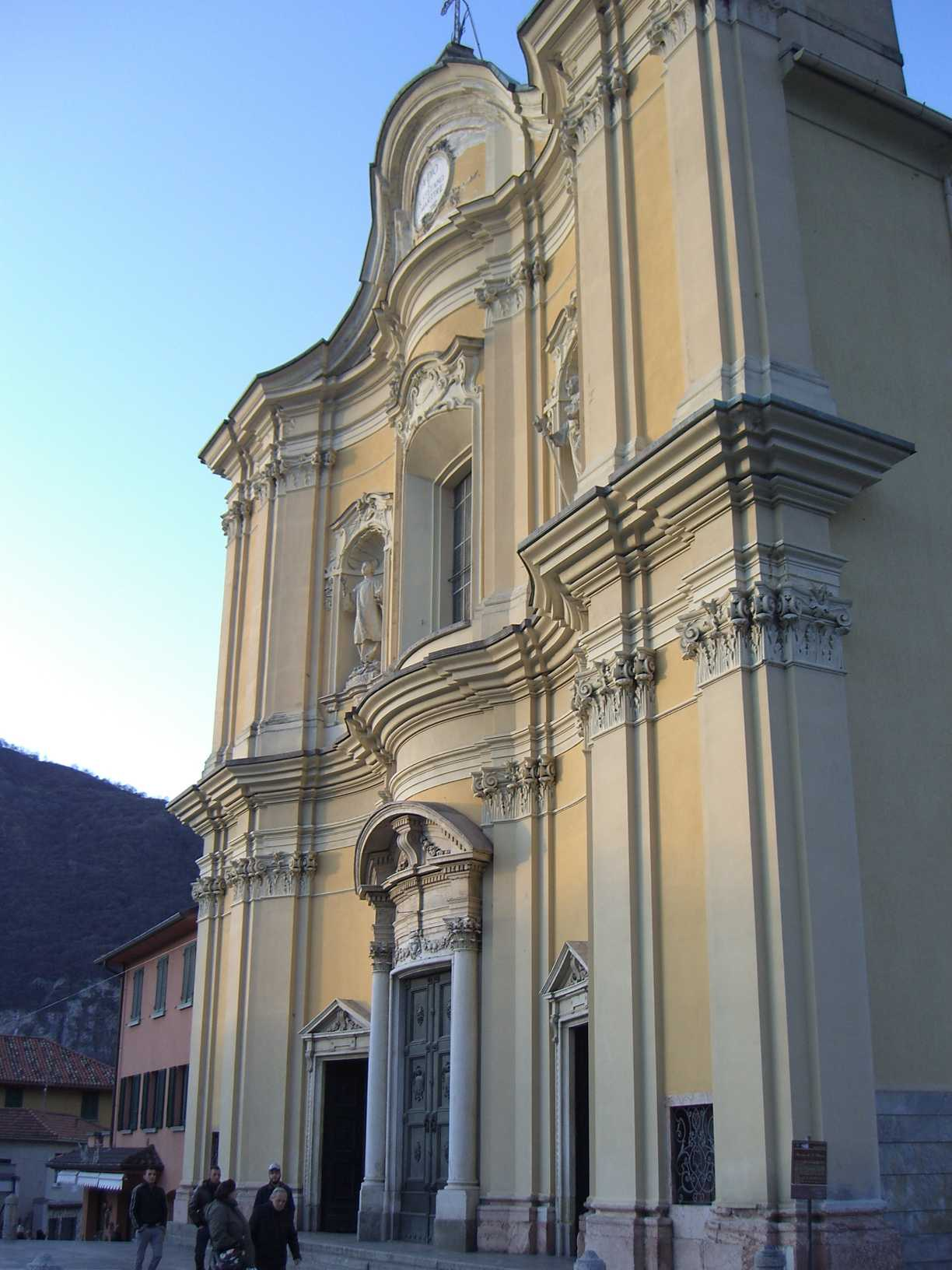
Façade of St. Stephen's parish church

The surviving 18th-century silk factory is informally known as Filandùn (with the annexed Villa Verza). Other factories include the Pellizzoni factory and the spinning mill near to the water hammer, now a Youth Oratory and Park.

Nearby land is terraced with farm cottages named Fabrica, Cà Quarantina, Cà Duglia and Cà Miglia, Cà Bianca. Notable sights include the old market's facade and portico and the block of houses facing the church. The church's main part is now the Convent of the Nuns, but in the past was composed of notables' palaces (generally 18th century businessmen).

Notable villas include Villa Zucchelli, Villa Conti-Ponti, Villa Raverta, Villa Arcellazzi, Villa Gavazzi.

Local lifestyles include a reproduction of Milanese living, as in cafés such as Albergo Canzo, Ponti and Citterio. Neoclassical villas span the last three centuries, especially near the boundaries of the southern train station. The stations themselves are neoclassical, with Liberty influences, built around 1900. Another major building of this style is the Teatro Sociale (Social Theatre), built at the end of the 18th century (during Austrian domination) by the architects and artists of Milan's La Scala. Many palaces in the Old Town preserve on their walls accurate engravings and the typical ochre colour. The Magno Magni villa (1903–1906), built into a park extending from Mirabèla and Grimèll, is a product of the architect Pietro Fenoglio, in a neo-medieval style; the exterior is characterized by its Vicentine stones and by the garden, which contains structures such as medieval-style towers surrounding an elaborate interior. Another style is that of "new urbanization", called Parisùn or Parisone.

=== Parks ===
Parco Barni is the former park of a rich family, separated from the Commune after World War II. It is surrounded by a wall. The original gate is on Via Volta, while two other gates are on Via Roma and on Piazzale Remo Sordo. The interior presents many features of the old villas' parks, such as hiding places, artificial lakes and rivers, and exotic or monumental woods. Its western gate is near to the southern railway station, while the other two gates are near Garibaldi Square. A hidden door links the park with the Social Theatre's yard.

Parco Giochi (Games Park) is situated in front of the new market square, named Piazza Giovanni XXIII. It contains a game area for children and a sports village with soccer, tennis, basketball and volleyball fields and a café-restaurant-pizzeria. Nearby Piazzetta Turati is a small park adjoining the park of Villa Meda. Other parks are in the Parisone area, containing two soccer and athletics stadia. The local teams are US Canzese for the former and ATL for the latter. A children's courtyard, the "Campetto", is furnished for basketball and free play. The Jesus with Children Chapel and the Holy Cross Chapel are there.

== Culture ==
=== Languages ===
The official language is Italian. About 25% of the Canzese people also speak the Lombard language. Other languages are Arabic, Romanian and Russian.

Local pronunciation of Italian is similar to that in Milan, with a prevalence of open vowels in closed sillables, as in quèsto (as against Standard Italian quésto, "this (one)") or murètto (as against Standard Italian murétto, "little wall"), the wide use of voiced /dz/ instead of Standard Italian /ts/, as in /ˈdzukːero/ instead of /ˈtsukːero/ ("sugar"), and the softening of geminates. In common with Standard Italian, it strongly distinguishes voiceless from voiced consonants. It is unlike Central and Southern pronunciations, which are unbalanced toward voiced ones.

Due to the different pronunciation of Lombard, the people of Canzo do not show the typical Milanese nasal accent. Other regional pronunciations of Italian are also present (especially those of Central Italy and Apulia), along with Venetian, Neapolitan and Sicilian languages in a family context.

Latin is also used in plaques and inscriptions and in liturgical and academic contexts. Almost all schools in the region teach English as a first foreign language, with French, German or Spanish as a second. Knowledge of Ancient Greek is widespread. It is taught in liceo classico secondary schools and because of the presence of Byzantine Greek fixed formulas in the Ambrosian Rite of the Catholic liturgy. Traditional songs in Piedmontese, Venetian and Friulian are sung.

The local speech is called Canzés or Canzées, a dialect of the Insubric or Western Lombard language It is recognized by UNESCO as one of the two branches of Lombard. The central variety of Western Lombard is the Milanese dialect, which is used as a lingua franca for all Western Lombard speakers. The Canzés dialect culturally belongs to the Brianzöö dialect's family, as influenced by 19th century Milanese, Comasco and Lecchese dialects. The substratum of Canzo's primitive population further separates it from other Brianzöö dialects. For example, in phonetics you can see the prevalence of the vowel /a/ instead of Milanese /e/ or common Brianzoeu /u/. Its lexicon is conservative in comparison with surrounding dialects and modern Milanese. Its grammar employs a wide variety of registers, e.g. noble (similar to Old Milanese, but with strong idioms and conservative pronunciation), commercial (with many influences, especially from Lecchese and southern Brianzöö), peasant (prevalence of idioms and few similarities to Erba and Asso dialects), and alpée (with proper phonetic and lexical idioms). A major difference from Milanese pronunciation is the absence of vowel nasalization, rendered in Canzés with the velar nasal consonant, and the conservation of /ts/ instead of Milanese /s/, as in the pronunciation of the toponym Canz, along with the absence of Milanese half-geminates. Like the other conservative Brianzoeu dialects, Canzés has a certain number of original Lombard terminations in /tʃ/ (spelled as "cc"): typically, lacc ("milk"), frècc ("cold"), tècc ("roof"), nòcc ("night"), tücc ("everybody").

=== Art, literature, and performing arts ===
Theatre troupes include Filodrammatica Canzese and Mobeel. The Social Theatre hosts theatre companies acting in Italian, Venetian, Lombard, Neapolitan, German languages. Every year on the last Thursday of January Cumpagnia di Nost's Giubiana is presented in the streets, with a traditional script in Lombard.

Orchestras and bands include Amicinbanda, Corale e Coretto S. Stefano, Coro e Orchestra MM. M. e C. Colombo, Coro Alpini Canzo and Quijcacanta. Operetta outdoor concerts take place in Parco Barni.

Live-music genres that are part of the town's cultural heritage include Alpine Polyphonic Chant, Lyric Music, Ambrosian Chant and Baroque music.

Canzese painters include Salvatore Fiume, Testa, Raverta, Cremonini (two paintings by whom are sited outdoors in Canzo) and Gerosa. Giovanni Segantini painted some of his works there.

The masterpieces of Canzese literature in the Lombard language are "In ucasiun" by Tiziano Corti, for poetry (monolingual), and "Al föch" by Cinzia Valli, for prose (bilingual with Italian). The former is a collection of circumstance poems, including one bilingual poem (Un restauro preciso e sapiente...), while the latter is an essay on popular wisdom, based on the element of fire.

=== Festivals ===
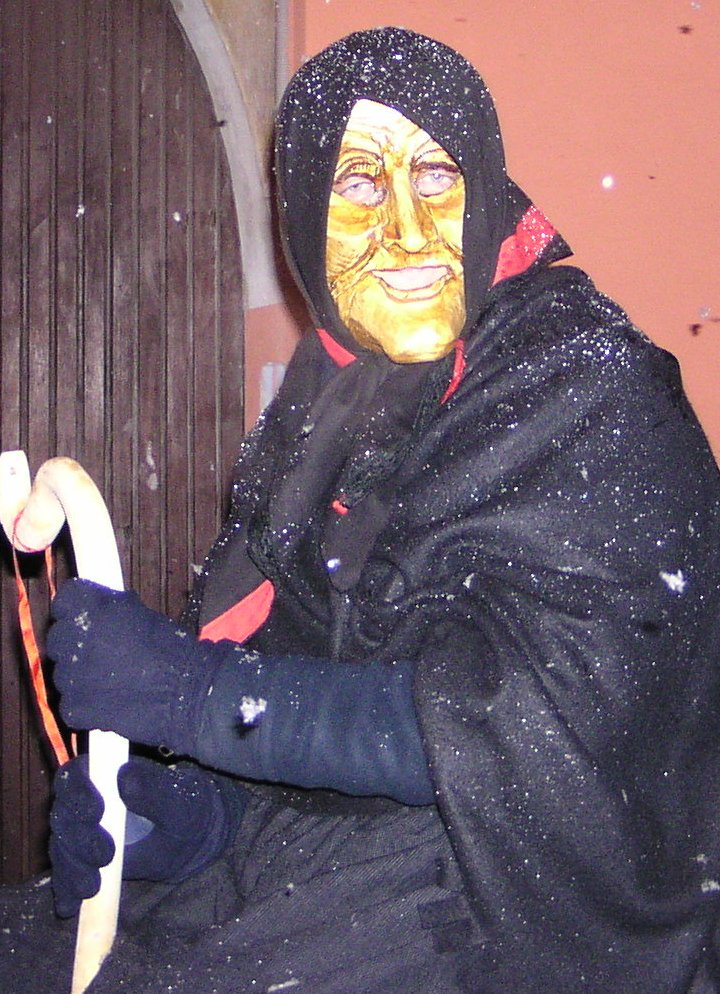
Giubiana's mask, during her transport to the courthouse

==== Giubiana ====
One of the most traditional events in Canzo is the Giubiana, which is celebrated on the last Thursday of January. It dates to the Insubric people (7th–2nd century BC) and consists of a propitiatory rite for the end of winter. Its name is derived from Jupiter, the Roman "translation" of an unknown Insubric god of spring. The rite immolates a puppet on a bonfire. The puppet carries all the evils of the past year (similar to the Hebrew "scapegoat"). During the last two millennia, the manifestation has absorbed other symbolic values, such as the renunciation of idols and the stigmatization of old age. It is diffused throughout Brianza, the Province of Varese and some parts of Piedmont. In Canzo this feast experienced a revival in the 1980s, thanks to the ethnological research of Cumpagnia di Nost; and in recent decades Canzo's Giubiana has been imitated by many of Brianza's villages. The three aspects of the nighttime feast, held in the Old Town are:

- a procession from Cipiloeu da San Rocch, in which many characters are seen, such as Anguana (water sprite), devils, witches and symbolic characters such as the Hunter and the Bear. The children follow the cortege with faces coloured white or black, with little bells or iron pots.
- a criminal trial of Gubiana the puppet, conducted in Lombard, with witnesses for the prosecution and defence, the harangue of Giubiana's counsel and the reading of Giubiana's threatening last will, the judgement of the Regiuus (the heads of Canzo's families and Town senators) and the pronouncing of the verdict.
- the bonfire and a supper based on risotto with sausage (lugànega) and mulled wine (vin brulé).

==== BIOFERA ====
In Villa Meda on the first weekend of September BIOFERA takes place. It is one of the main organic farming events in Italy (with over 10,000 visitors) and a festival of Lombard culture. It began in 1988 as an evolution from the Festa di Nost (1983) by the Canzese association Cumpagnia di Nost. BIOFERA offers organic food and drink, with exhibitors from across Europe. Historical, ethnological and geographical books are for sale. Other events include a dramatization laboratory, a ludoteque, performances of traditional songs and exhibitions, games, theatre shows and music laboratories for children. It has an area dedicated to handicrafts with environmentally compatible items, a refreshment area with both vegan and traditional cuisines, and a wellbeing area. Inside the fair free conferences on cultural or spiritual themes take place.

==== Fera di üsei ====
The oldest tourist event in Canzo is "Fera di üsei", started in 1963 by the Hunters' Association. It occurs in August, in the area of Piazzale Giovanni XXIII. It consists of a bird exposition, with exhibitors from all Europe. Hunting dog competitions, household pet shows and farm animals such as chicken and turkey. On the first morning a competition of singing birds takes place in Parco Barni. It greatly aided Canzo's tourist development in the second half of the 20th century, along with entertainment events of Azienda Autonoma di Soggiorno, the local section of the Public Tourism Agency, now extinct (with the participation of Mike Bongiorno, Adriano Celentano and other stars of the moment). It was later imitated by other towns and villages of Brianza, with minor fairs. Today it attracts people from across Lombardy.

==== St. Mir celebrations ====
In May, the religious feast of St. Mir takes place on 10 May (according to the Martyrologium Nocomiensis), 21 May (probably the day on which the first recognition of St. Mir's relics occurred) or the second Friday of the month. During the last few decades, the feast has been celebrated on Sunday, with a Mass in the parish church, in which the monastic community of St. Mirett participates. On that occasion, during an evening programme at the Social Theatre, a Committee composed of members of the Commune and of the parish awards a prize to a deserving resident. Every Thursday and Sunday in July and August, a Eucharist is celebrated in the mountain hermitage of St. Mir.

==== Gruppo Alpini Canzo ====
Gruppo Alpini Canzo organizes other public and tourist events, particularly the Chestnut festival in October–November and the meetings on Mount Cornizzolo, along with concerts of its Polyphonic Choir of Alpine songs. Fireworks, concerts, open-air dramas, comic shows are held during summer. Other yearly events are the Feast of the Volunteers (by SOS Canzo), the Patronal feast of St. Stephen (26 December), the Magg (in May, the carrying of a fir from the wood to the town by eighteen-year-olds), the Day of the Sun (Lughnasadh, the traditional men's day and celebration of the agriculture of the mountains) and the Cargà i Alp (route in the mountains, recalling the ancient practice of annually moving animals to the upper stables).

=== Cuisine ===
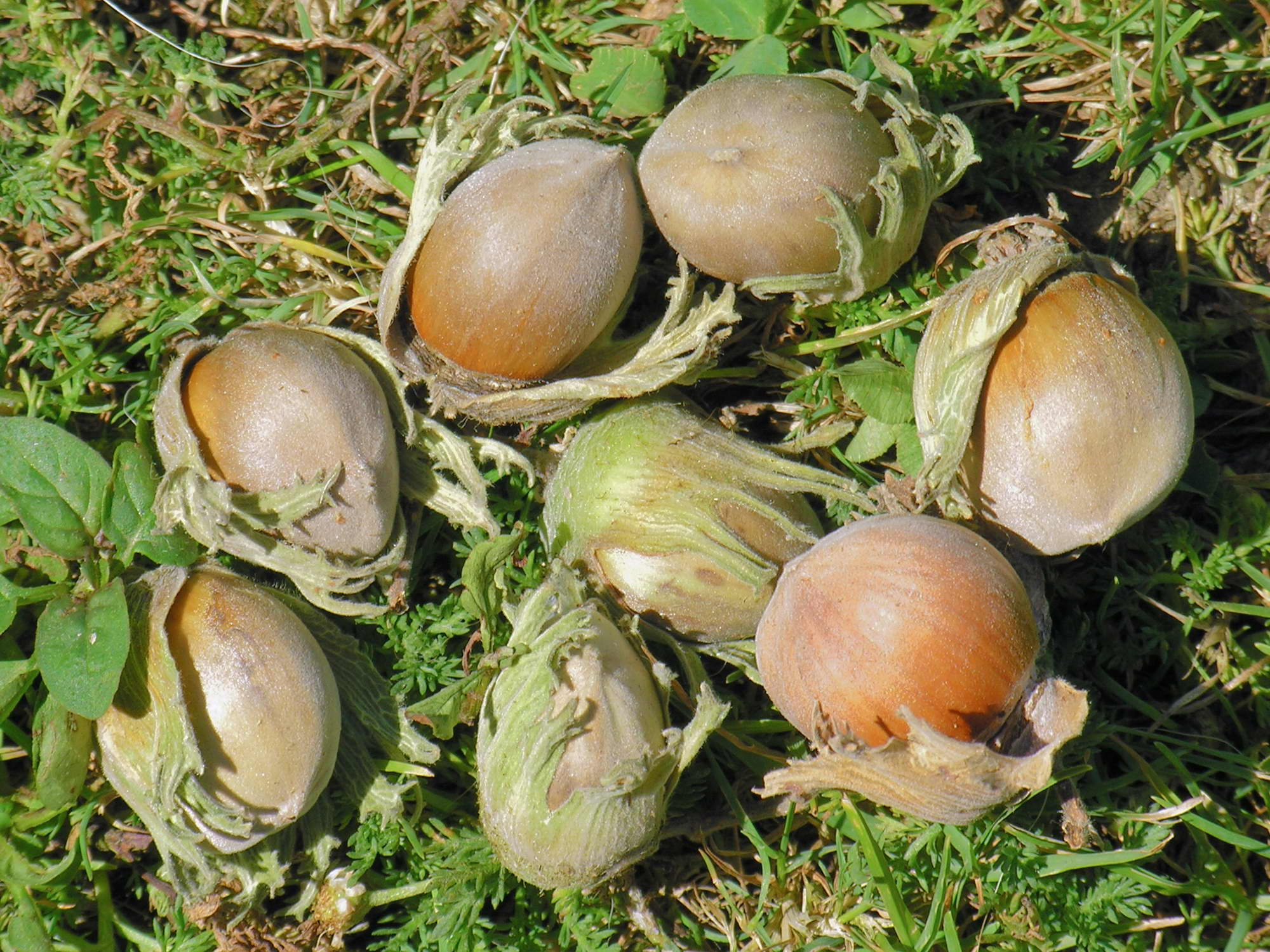
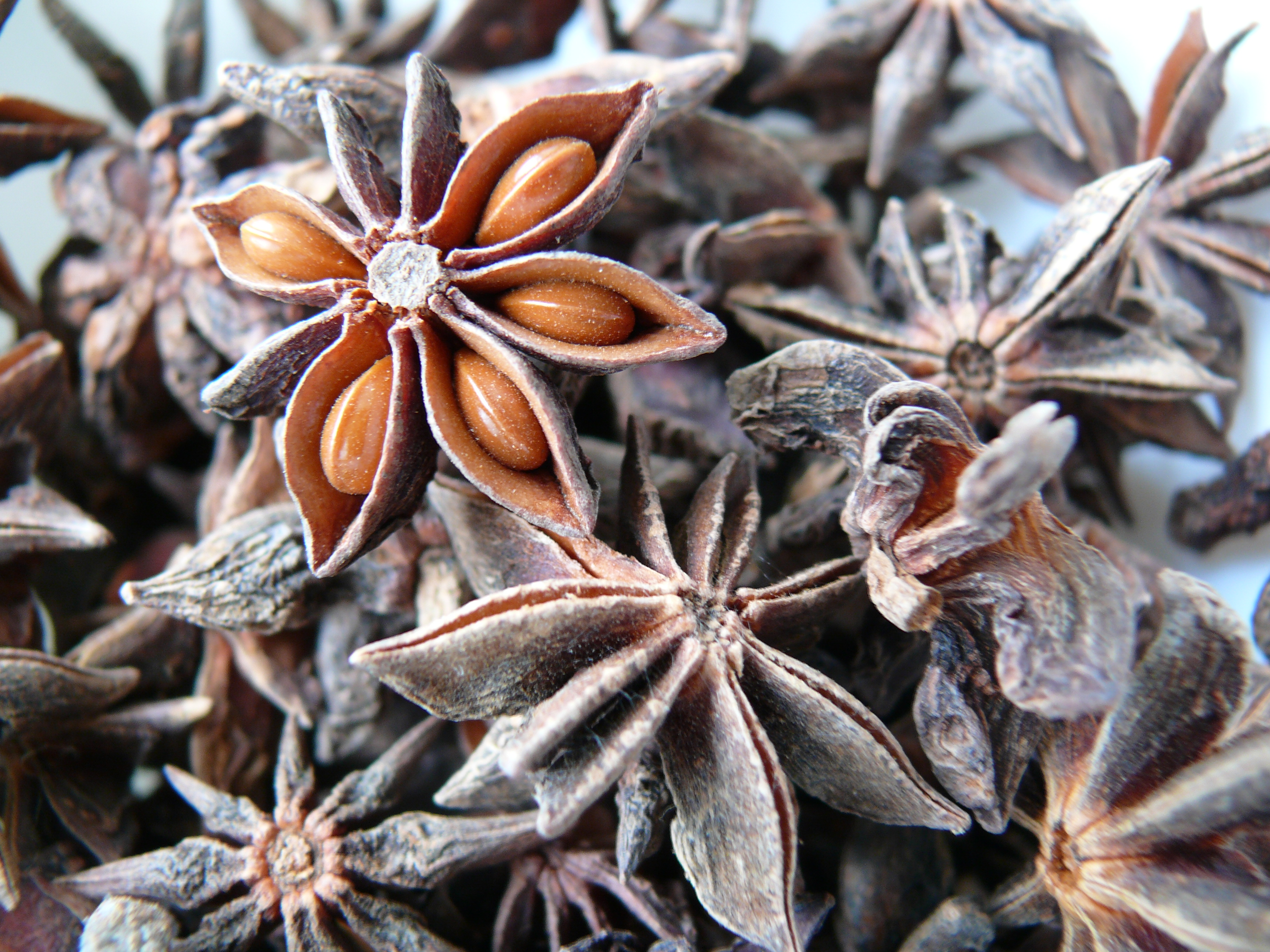
Left: hazelnuts, whose flour is necessary to produce nocciolini di Canzo. Right: Illiucium verum, one of the many aromas of Vespetrò.

The cuisine of northern Brianza is based upon maize (used in polenta and cakes), Italian vegetables (used especially in minestra and minestrone), pork (salami is typical), wine (like that of Montevecchia), cheeses, milk and butter (or lard), rice (as in risotto), game and freshwater fish, and other primary products. Canzo has a time-honoured tradition in salami and cold meat production; Canzo's wine, cultivated in the Veronica district, is called ragett. Local chicken, cow, goat, rabbit and frogs are typical ingredients. Meals include cassoeula, tripe (busecca) and salmì, carpione or dry fish; various kinds of soup or broth, sometimes with rice. Birds are eaten with polenta; mushrooms also with polenta, or in a risotto.

A typical Canzese dish based on mushrooms is funghi trifolati. One kind of pasta is made with pumpkin instead of wheat flour. A sweet bread, called pan meino, is characteristic of northern Brianza, along with a kind of fritter, named paradèll in Canzo; fruit mustard is usual with meat. Native products featured in Canzo's dishes include roast throstles, little birds with polenta and poccen de salsa e fongs secch. In the Terz Alp and mountains pulénta e lacc and hard hot polenta in cold milk are favored. Coq au vin and boeuf à la mode have special forms there. Témpia cui sciger is the temple of a pig cooked in a soup of chickpeas, a dish for All Souls' Day.

Canzo is famous for:

- Nocciolini di Canzo (a kind of biscuit)
- Vespetrò (a kind of liqueur)

=== Religion ===
The prevalent and traditional religion of Canzo's population is Roman Catholicism.

Men expect from the various religions answers to the unsolved riddles of the human condition, which today, even as in former times, deeply stir the hearts of men: What is man? What is the meaning, the aim of our life? What is moral good, what is sin? Whence suffering and what purpose does it serve? Which is the road to true happiness? What are death, judgment and retribution after death? What, finally, is that ultimate inexpressible mystery which encompasses our existence: whence do we come, and where are we going?

— Roman Catholic Church in Nostra aetate (1965)

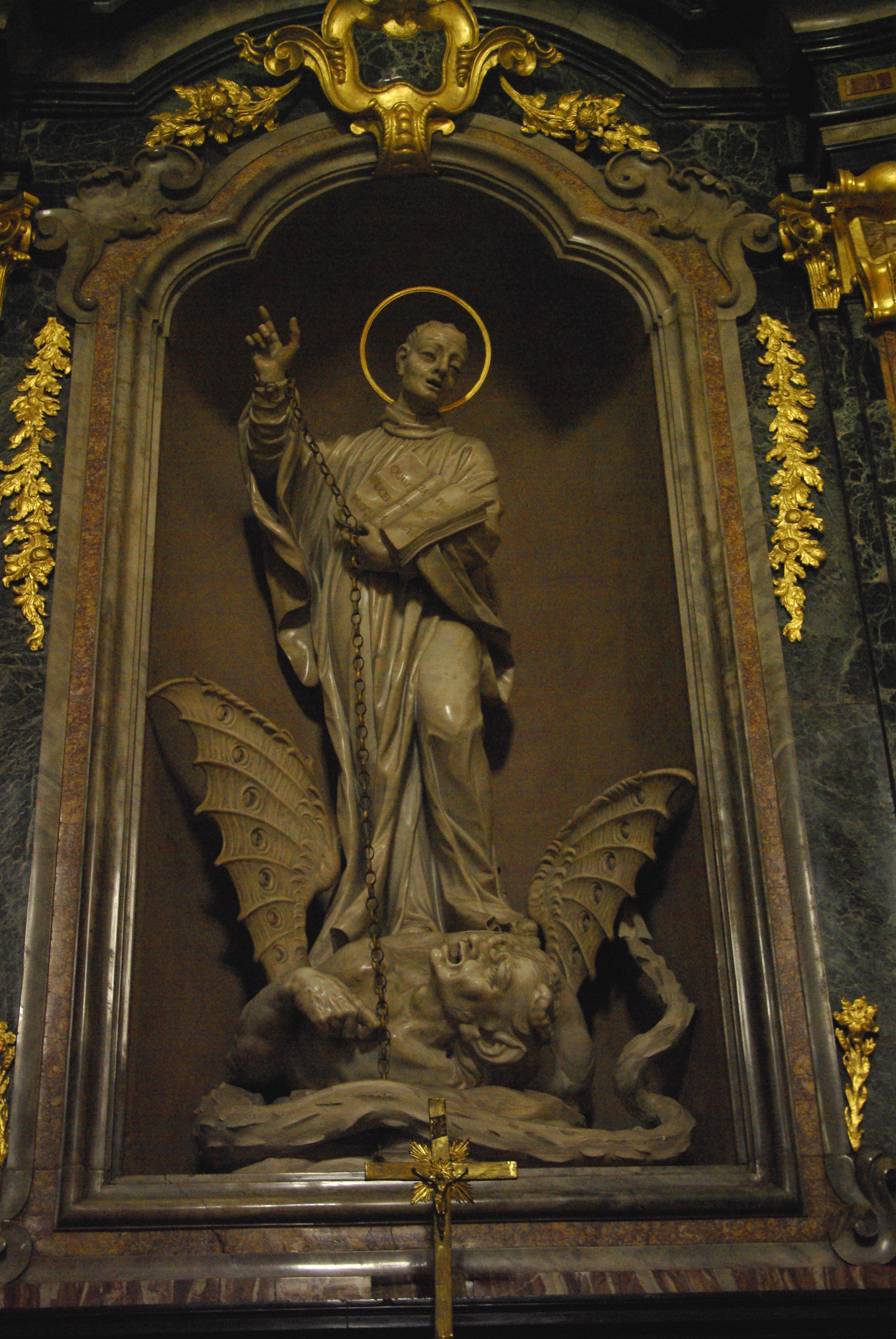
White marble sculpture of Bernard of Clairvaux winning against the devil (~1740), in one of the four minor altars of Canzo parish church

Canzo has a deep heritage of religious witnesses. It is characterized by the Communal, Ambrosian, Natural law and St. Mir's spiritualities.

The main author of the Communal spirituality is Bonvesin de la Riva. One of his verses, transcribed in classic orthography reads:

Ove l'omm no mètt el coeur e l'ingegn, nient var.
Where a man does not put his heart and genius, there is no value.

— Bonvesin de la Riva, Libro delle Tre Scritture (1274)

This hymn is an exemplar of Ambrosian spirituality:

Splendor paternae gloriae, de luce lucem proferens, lux lucis et fons luminis, diem dies illuminans.
O splendor of my Father's glory, Light brought from light, Light of lights and fountain of light, The day that enlightens day.
...in Patre totus Filius, et totus in Verbo Pater.
...in the Father all the Son, and the whole Father in the Word (Logos).

— Saint Ambrose of Milan, Hymn Splendor paternae gloriae (~350)

An example of Natural law doctrine is found in the Italian Constitution is:

Art. 2: The Republic recognises and guarantees the inviolable rights of the person, both as an individual and in the social groups where human personality is expressed.
The Republic expects that the fundamental duties of political, economic and social solidarity be fulfilled.
Art. 29: The Republic recognises the rights of the family as a natural society founded on marriage.[...]

— Constitution of the Italian Republic (1945)

Saint Mir served as an example of love for the poor. The rock on the River Ravella under which he slept is visible next to the path connecting St. Mir's hermitage to Terz Alp.

=== Toponymy ===
Place names help reveal the ethnological topography of the area, which concerns the conservation and analysis of the region's toponomastic heritage. Some of these names are Celtic, some Latin, and other from Longobard, with a specific Western Lombard pronunciation.

The Commune of Canzo and the Cumpagnia di Nost created three maps displaying the places of Canzo with their local language toponyms. The first map (Mapa di sitt) covers the communal territory and gives the names of the mountains and lesser peaks, of hunting or digging localities, of the springs and rocks, and of ancient main paths and old frazioni (hamlets). The second (Mapa di lööch) gives the toponymy of agricultural fields, while the third (Mapa dal paés vecc) portrays streets, quarters and remarkable places of the Old Town. Some of these are Cèpp da l'Angua, alias Scalfìn dal Diaul, with a double (Celtic and Christian) denomination, the Sass dal Prim Fiöö (stone of the first son), a trace of an ancient cult for successful delivery of children, Crann (a Celtic root meaning "hard"), Alpèt, Alp a vòlt, Repussìn and so on. Some famous fields in Canzo are Tèra russa (Red Earth) and Lagüsc (Little Lake); Parisùn and Gerascia; Castèll and Cà bianca; Grimèll, Mirabèla and Cèpp; Cà Milia, Cà Dulia and Cà növa (Cà means "house" or "farmhouse"). Cuntrada da San Mirètt, Cuntrada dal Cuèrc, Pretòri, Portacinées, Turèta, Bergamasca, Caravazz are a few examples of the Old Town's toponyms.

The oldest surnames of Canzo are Carpani, Masciadri, Pellizzoni, Ponti, Prina and Locatelli. The Carpani were one of the main families in the Corte de Casale administration, and have a house in Caslino; a castle appears in their coat of arms. The Masciadri surname is derived from the vocation of wandering peddler; Pellizzoni, in the modern shape, or Pelliccione, as it was during the Cinquecento, is the surname of a famous free captain who acted virtually as a vassal of Canzo during his life. Ponti/Conti-Ponti was a wealthy family linked with the silk industry. Prina is the oldest surname testified to by a written document, in which they appear as the owners of one third of Canzese territory, in name of the Cathedral of Monza's Capitle. They kept the land until the first years of the 20th century. Locatelli is probably the modern form of the surname Catelli/Catella, found in some medieval documents among Canzo's heads of families and also in a female saint, who was born in Canzo. Nowadays, Paredi and Pina are the most widespread and typical surnames: the first may have originally been the common denomination of a Welsh clan established in Canzo's mountains by the emperors as a border defence. It is famous because Saint Mir belonged to this clan. Pina is said to be a hybrid Spanish-Canzese family (Piña), or a Canzese family that had links with the Spanish administration, and became the most common.

== Notable people from Canzo ==
- Salvatore Fiume (1915–1997), painter
- Gabriele Moreno Locatelli (1959–1993), religious and pacifist
- Filippo Turati (1857–1932), politician
- Viola Valentino (born 1949), singer

== Infrastructure ==
=== Education ===
- Infant school (E. & F. Arcellazzi)
- Primary school (Guglielmo Marconi)
- Junior high school (Filippo Turati)
- All kinds of Senior high school within a 12 mi range
- All kinds of University departments in 14 Universities in Lombardy
- Communal Library (open afternoons) in Villa Meda

=== Transport ===
- Two railway stations (south-north) on the line Canzo–Milan, passing through the cities of Erba, Mariano Comense, Seveso, and the university quarter of Milan Bovisa
- Bus lines to Asso, Como, Erba and Lecco
- Provincial roads to Arosio and Bellagio; you reach Lecco in 20 min, Como in 30, Monza in 40, Milan (and its Linate Airport) in 50, Bergamo and Varese (and their Orio Airport and Malpensa Airport) in 1 h

== Civic life ==
Nine sports associations, five performing arts associations and four naturalists' associations exist. Notables:

- Gruppo Alpini Canzo. Promotes care of the natural environment, for the spiritual and intellectual education of new generations and volunteers in missions of civil protection. The members are former soldiers of the Alpini corps. They also organize tourist events.
- Pubblica assistenza SOS. Ambulance and medical aid services using over 150 volunteers that is inspired by principles of Christian charity and solidarity. It was founded in 1979.
- Gruppo Naturalistico della Brianza. Study, understand and help to resolve environmental problems, emphasizing environmental education. They give lessons in the schools, meet with other associations, and give exhibits, contests and observational trips. It was founded in 1960 by Giorgio Achermann and Adolfo Rancati.
- Oratorio. An institution of the Catholic Church for youth pastoral care. It offers prayer, catechesis, community experiences, play and sport, cultural openmindedness, charity and social diligence. It has links with the transmission of faith project within the parish community, but is open to all.
- CAI Canzo. Services for mountain safety and cultural and sports activities concerning alpinism and the mountains.
- Nonsoloturismo. Centered on tourist promotion. Collaborates with communal agencies in the organization of cultural events, entertainment and the Social Theatre.
- Fondazione Raverta. A foundation begun in 1997 to conserve the artistic heritage of late watercolour painter Giuseppe Raverta. It cares for the promotion of the arts by organizing conferences, publications, exhibits and concerts.
- Cumpagnia di Nost. Rescue and defend local culture as an element of exchange with other identities.
- Associazione Nazionale Carabinieri – Canzo. Active and retired Carabinieri and their families who promote devotion to the fatherland and the memory of the fallen, and to encourage social responsibility.

=== Sports ===
Moto Club Canzo, existing since the '50s and refounded in 1975, is the most prestigious motorcycle trials institution in Italy. It has been a pioneer club in this sport. In 1985 it held the first official Trial des Nations, who has been consequently expanded, by proposal of the canzese club itself, to an annual worldwide event. In 1988 it also held the World Championship and in 1992 Tommi Ahvala, racer of Moto Club Canzo, was world champion in this discipline. Since 1995 it also helds an unofficial European race called Old Trial Cup. Among its racers, Tommi Ahvala, Xavier Miquel and Donato Miglio.

== See also ==
- Corni di Canzo
- Canzés dialect
- Giubiana
- Brianza
- Milan–Asso railway
- Ambrosian Rite

== Bibliography ==
- Longoni, Virginio (1998). Religiosità e cultura del Rinascimento nel Triangolo Lariano. Immagini di un'epoca. Canzo: Comunità Montana del Triangolo Lariano, Assessorato alla Cultura.
- Longoni, Virginio (1999). Fonti per la storia del Triangolo Lariano. Il medioevo, Canzo: Comunità Montana del Triangolo Lariano, Assessorato alla Cultura.
- Prina, Stefano (2003–2006). Al Cadreghin. Gazetin di bagaj (da Canz). Canzo: Cumpagnia di Nost & Prinas.
- Rebora, Sergio [editor] (1998). Carlo Gerosa a Canzo (1805–1878). Ritratti e soggetti sacri. Comune di Canzo & Fondazione Raverta.
- Valli, Cinzia [editor] (1988–2002). Festa di Nost – Librett. Canzo: Comitato Biofera, Comune di Canzo & Cumpagnia di Nost.
