= Castelmarte =

Castelmarte Castell Mart
- Comune
- Comune di Castelmarte
- Location within Italy Location within Lombardy
- Coordinates: 45°50′N 9°14′E
- Country: Italy
- Region: Lombardy
- Province: Province of Como (CO)

Area
  - Total: 1.9 km^{2} (0.73 sq mi)
- Elevation: 459 m (1,506 ft)

Population (Dec. 2004)
  - Total: 1,293
  - Density: 680/km^{2} (1,800/sq mi)
- Demonym: urcéla (west.lmo. traditional gentilic)
- Time zone: UTC+1 (CET)
  - Summer (DST): UTC+2 (CEST)
- Postal code: 22030
- Dialing code: 031

Castelmarte (Brianzöö: Castell Mart [kaˌstɛl ˈmɑːrt]) is a comune (municipality) in the Province of Como in the Italian region Lombardy, located about 40 kilometres (25 mi) north of Milan and about 12 kilometres (7.5 mi) east of Como. As of 31 December 2004, it had a population of 1,293 and an area of 1.9 square kilometres (0.73 mi^{2}).

Castelmarte borders the following municipalities: Canzo, Caslino d'Erba, Erba, Ponte Lambro, Proserpio.

== Demographic evolution ==
Historical population

Year	Pop.	±%
1861	465	—
1871	471	+1.3%
1881	492	+4.5%
1901	554	+12.6%
1911	572	+3.2%

Year	Pop.	±%
1921	586	+2.4%
1931	549	−6.3%
1936	551	+0.4%
1951	577	+4.7%
1961	577	+0.0%

Year	Pop.	±%
1971	604	+4.7%
1981	910	+50.7%
1991	1,009	+10.9%
2001	1,247	+23.6%

Source: Data from ISTAT
