= Caslino d'Erba =

- Comune
- Comune di Caslino d'Erba
- Location within Italy Location within Lombardy
- Coordinates: 45°50′N 9°14′E
- Country: Italy
- Region: Lombardy
- Province: Province of Como (CO)

Area
  - Total: 7.0 km^{2} (2.7 sq mi)

Population (Dec. 2004)
  - Total: 1,745
  - Density: 250/km^{2} (650/sq mi)
- Time zone: UTC+1 (CET)
  - Summer (DST): UTC+2 (CEST)
- Postal code: 22030
- Dialing code: 031

Caslino d'Erba (Brianzöö: Caslin [kaˈzlĩː]) is a comune (municipality) in the Province of Como in the Italian region Lombardy, located about 40 kilometres (40 km) north of Milan and about 12 kilometres (7.5 mi) east of Como. As of 31 December 2004, it had a population of 1,745 and an area of 7.0 square kilometres (2.7 mi^{2}).

Caslino d'Erba borders the following municipalities: Asso, Caglio, Canzo, Castelmarte, Erba, Faggeto Lario, Ponte Lambro, Rezzago.

== Demographic evolution ==
Historical population

Year	Pop.	±%
1861	934	—
1871	1,033	+10.6%
1881	1,110	+7.5%
1901	1,235	+11.3%
1911	1,267	+2.6%

Year	Pop.	±%
1921	1,258	−0.7%
1931	1,240	−1.4%
1936	1,228	−1.0%
1951	1,402	+14.2%
1961	1,399	−0.2%

Year	Pop.	±%
1971	1,416	+1.2%
1981	1,468	+3.7%
1991	1,575	+7.3%
2001	1,714	+8.8%

Source: Data from ISTAT
