= Gabriele Moreno Locatelli =

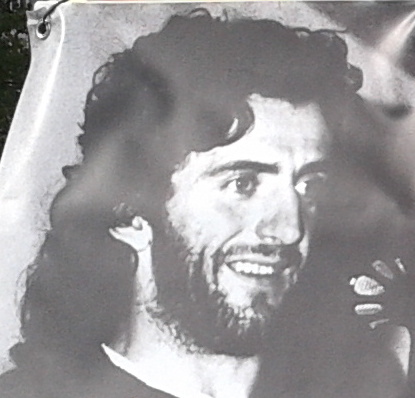
- Born: 3 May 1959; Canzo, Italy
- Died: 3 October 1993; Sarajevo, Bosnia and Herzegovina
- Occupations: Student, Pacifist

Gabriele Moreno Locatelli (3 May 1959, in Canzo – 3 October 1993, in Sarajevo) was an Italian pacifist. He was killed by a Serbian sniper during the Bosnian War.

== Biography ==
He was described as a sensitive and generous young man. He was a Catholic. He engaged very fast in diverse actions to help the most discriminated against in Italy. He was a student in theology and literature. A selection of his poetry and papers is included in the La mia strada book.

=== Death ===
Locatelli had joined the Beati i Costruttori di Pace (Blessed are the Peacemakers), a Catholic aid organization. The organization was there to deliver mail, assist the United Nations military in delivering food and clothing, and bring water and assistance to elderly and sick civilians in Sarajevo during the siege of Sarajevo. Locatelli was shot and killed by a sniper while crossing the Vrbanja bridge with four other peace activists and a peace flag in his hands.

== International response ==
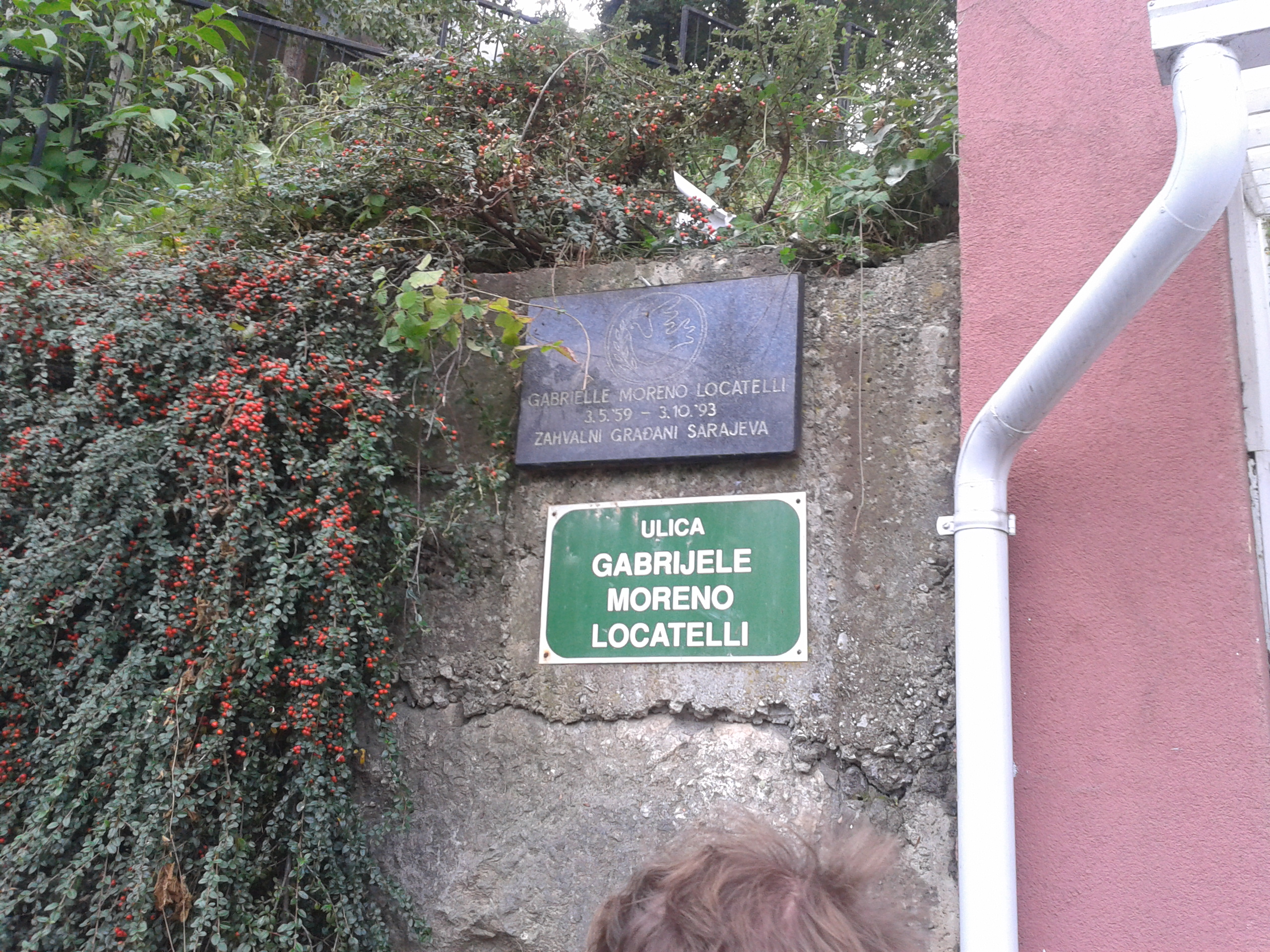
Street in Sarajevo named after Gabriele Moreno Locatelli

The international community was outraged by the killing. The day after his death, the Sarajevo daily Oslobodenje was prudently titled "Incident at Vrbanja," while the Italian newspapers' headlines included "Pacifist Italian killed by Serb snipers." In Sarajevo, he is honoured as a hero, an Italian martyr among many Bosnians. There were controversies about the way the Italian press covered the incident.

Locatelli's story inspired director Giancarlo Bocchi for the documentary "Death of a Pacifist" (1995).

The song "Bread and Peace" is also based on Locatelli's death.

== See also ==
- Siege of Sarajevo
- Bosnian War
- List of peace activists
