= Palanzone =

Mountain in Italy

Coordinates: 45°51′47″N 9°12′05″E

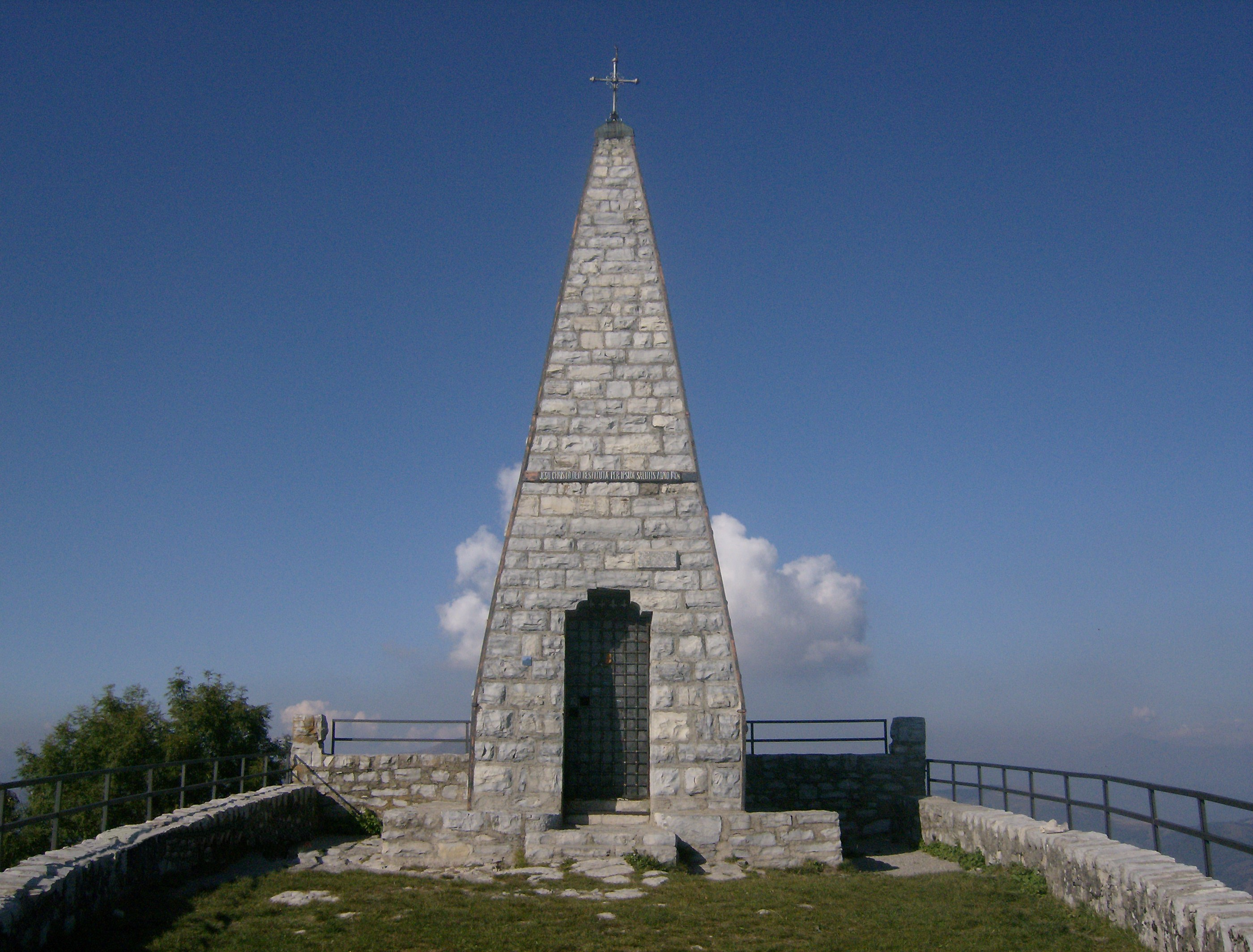

Highest point
- Elevation: 1,436 m (4,711 ft)
- Prominence: 315 m (1,033 ft)

Geography
- Location: Lombardy, Italy

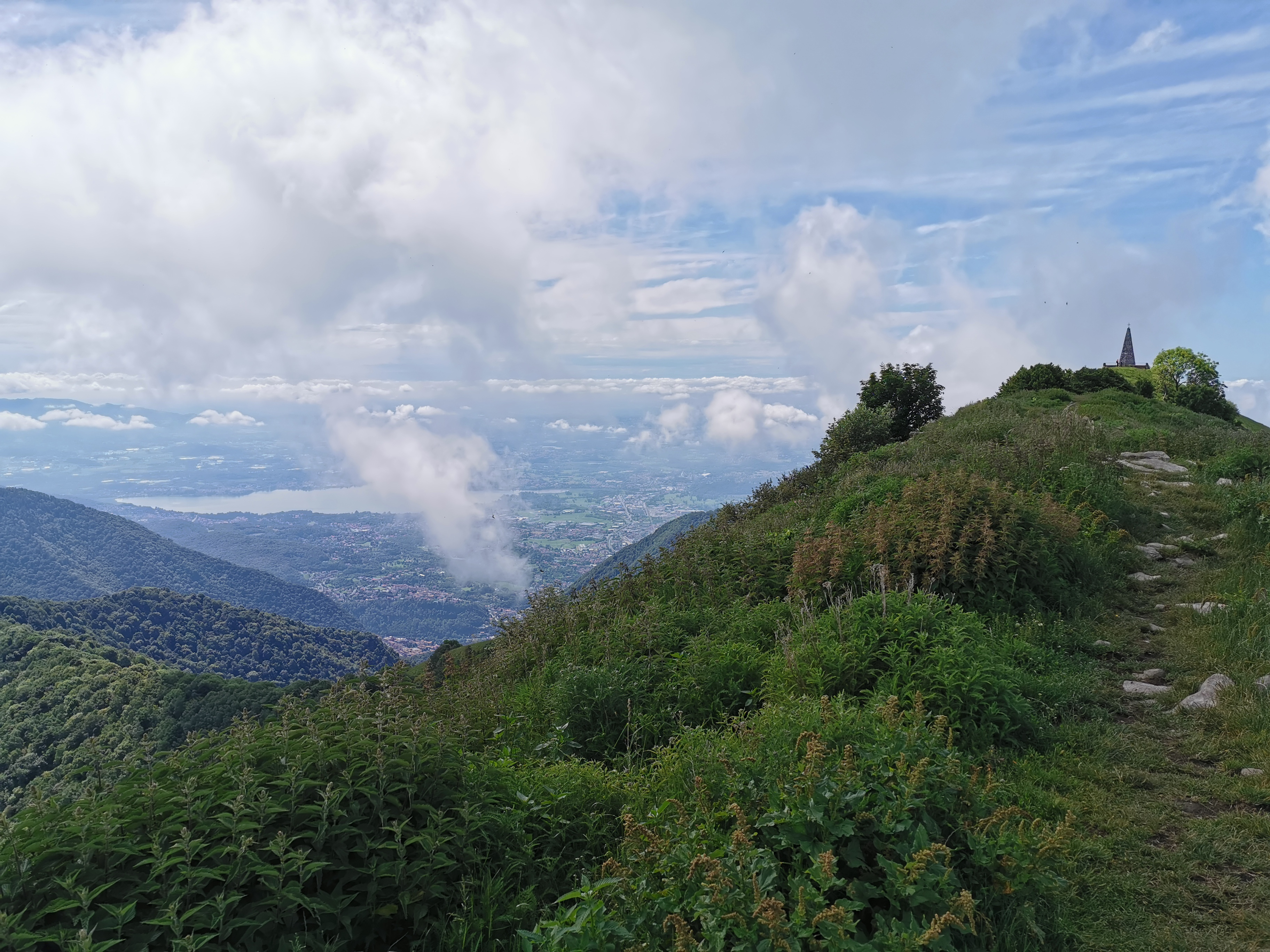
View from the path near the top of Monte Palanzone

Palanzone is a mountain of Lombardy, Italy. It has an elevation of 1,436 metres.
