= Bollettone =

Mountain in Italy

Coordinates: 45°50′14″N 9°10′48″E

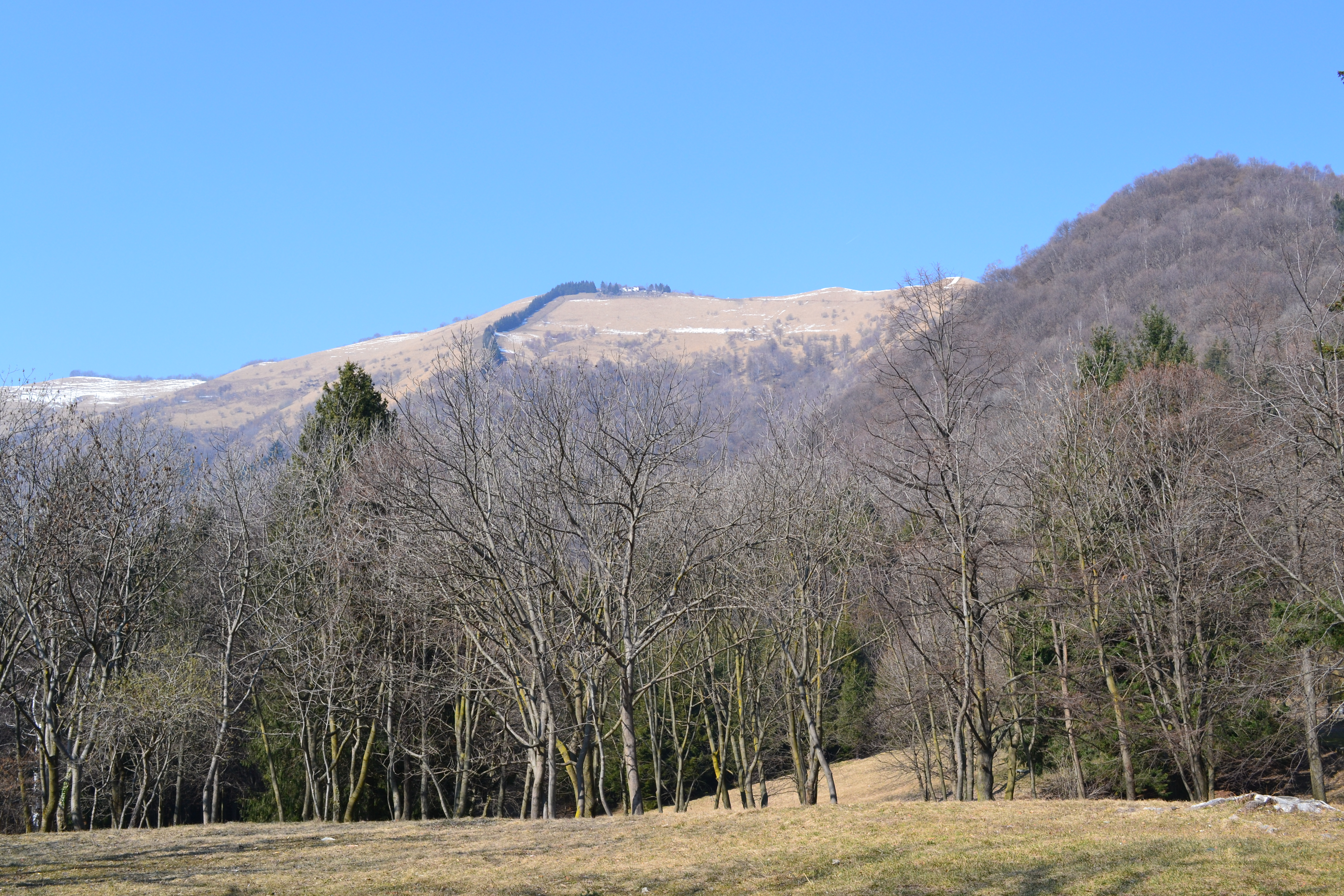

Highest point
- Elevation: 1,317 m (4,321 ft)
- Prominence: 192 m (630 ft)

Geography
- Location: Lombardy, Italy

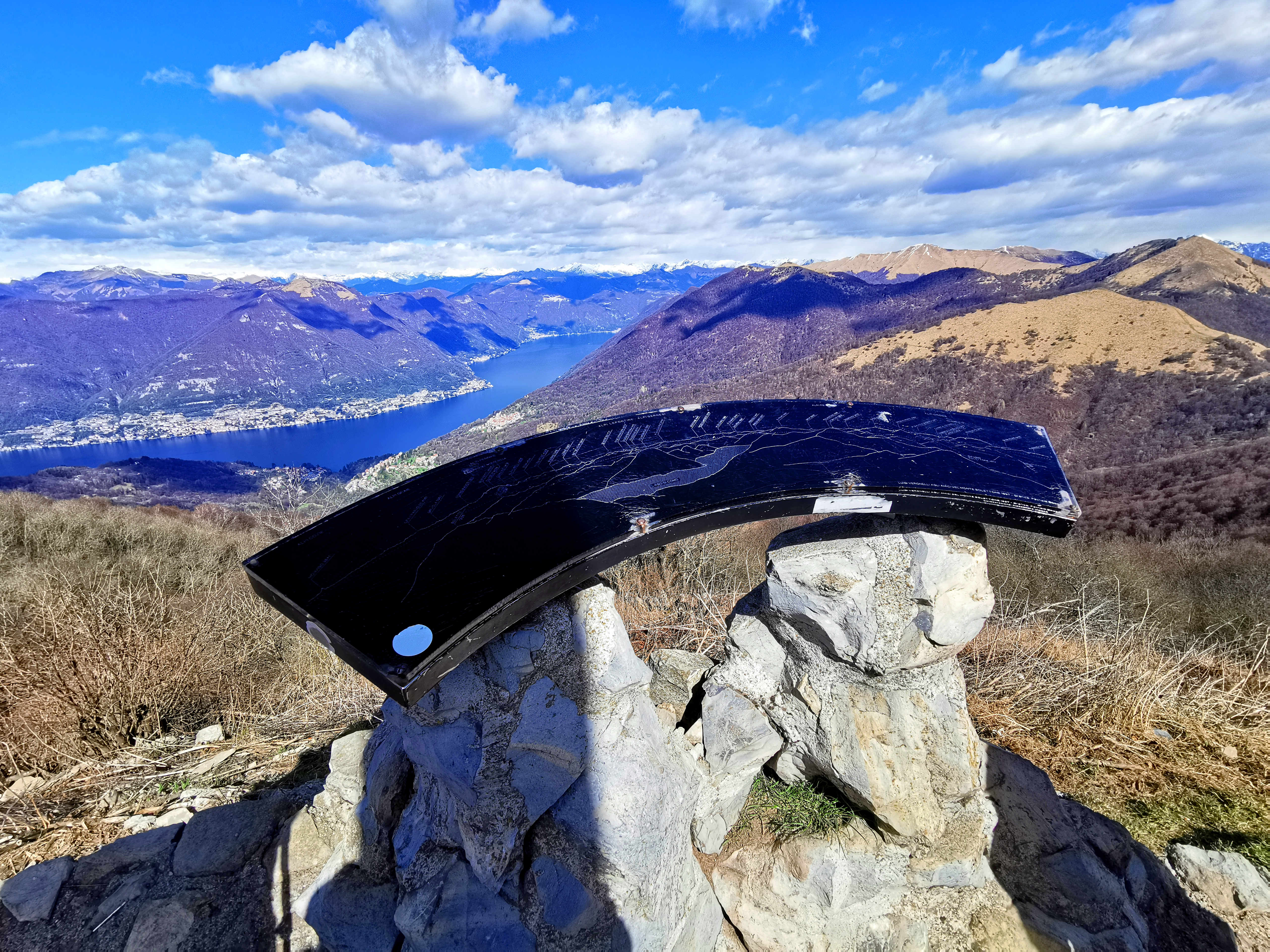
View from the top of Monte Bollettone, with Lake Como in the background

Bollettone is a mountain in Lombardy, Italy, located near Lake Como. It has an elevation of 1317 metres.
