= Lago del Segrino =

Lake in Italy

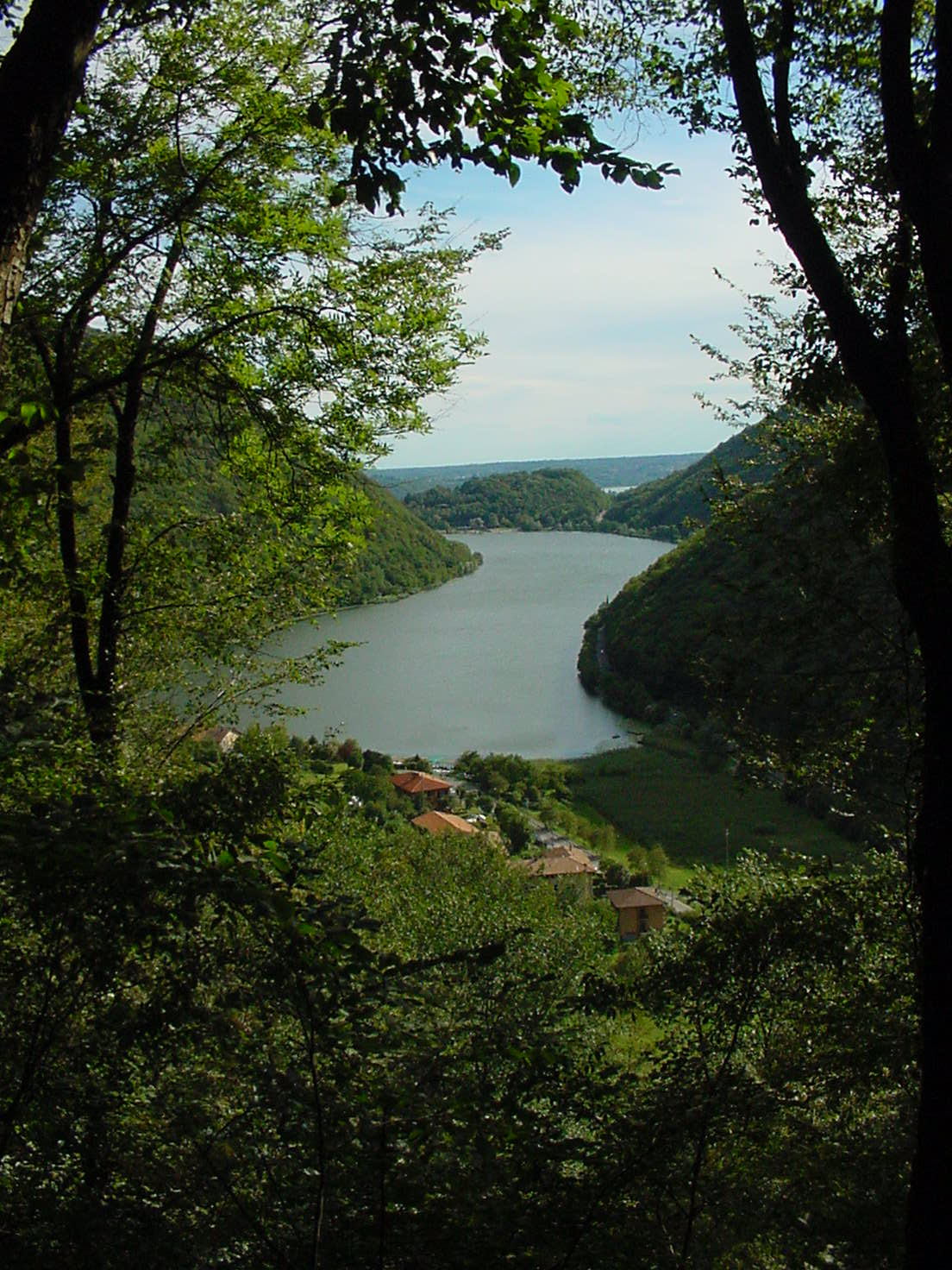

- Location within Lombardy
- Location: Province of Como, Lombardy
- Coordinates: 45°49′N 9°16′E
- Primary inflows: none
- Primary outflows: none
- Basin countries: Italy
- Surface area: 0.35 km^{2} (0.14 sq mi)
- Surface elevation: 374 m (1,227 ft)

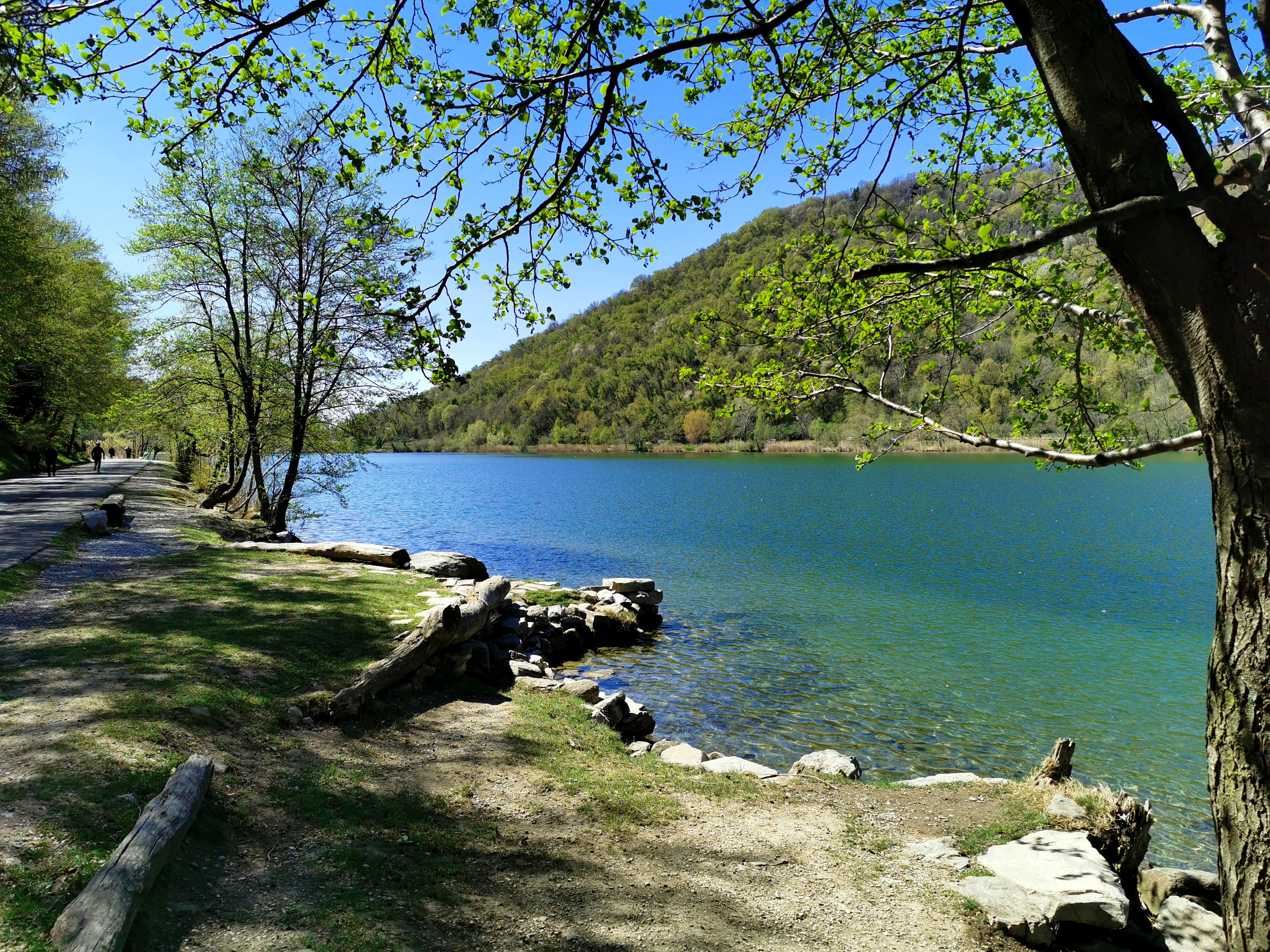
Lago del Segrino, seen from the cycle/pedestrian path around the lake

Lago del Segrino is a lake in the Province of Como, Lombardy, Italy. At an elevation of 374 m, its surface area is 0.35 km^{2}.
