= Strada statale 36 del Lago di Como e dello Spluga =

State highway in Italy

State Highway 36
- Strada statale 36

Route information
- Maintained by ANAS
- Length: 87.4 km (54.3 mi)
- Existed: 1928–present

Major junctions
- From: Sesto San Giovanni
- To: Splügen Pass

Location
- Country: Italy
- Regions: Lombardy

Highway system
- Roads in Italy; Autostrade; State; Regional; Provincial; Municipal
← SS 35	→ SS 37

Strada Statale 36 del Lago di Como e dello Spluga (designated SS 36) is an Italian state highway approximately 87.4 kilometres (54.3 mi) long, located entirely within the Lombardy region of Italy. It is a major highway and one of the primary north–south routes in Lombardy, providing the main access to the Valtellina valley and the Swiss canton of Grisons via the Splügen Pass (Italian: Passo dello Spluga). The route connects these northern areas with Milan and the southern parts of Lombardy.

== Route ==
The SS 36 originates in Milan at Piazzale Lagosta, initially following urban avenues Viale Zara and Viale Fulvio Testi northward. Official management by ANAS begins at kilometre 8.590, near the Sesto San Giovanni exit of the A4 motorway.

In Monza, the route takes the name Viale Lombardia and, since 2013, passes through a long urban tunnel constructed beneath this avenue. North of Monza, the SS 36 becomes the Nuova Valassina, a modern six-lane divided highway that crosses the Brianza region, passing near Muggiò, Lissone, Desio, Seregno, Carate Brianza, Verano Brianza, and Giussano. At Giussano, the highway reduces to four lanes and shifts eastward towards Lecco.

Beyond Civate (the highway's former northern terminus until 2000), the SS 36 continues towards Lecco via tunnels under Monte Barro and through the city centre. The Lecco city tunnel features stacked roadways, with northbound and southbound traffic on separate levels. Through Lecco, the route follows the Lake Como shoreline as an urban dual carriageway.

Near Abbadia Lariana, the SS 36 transitions into a modern four-lane highway section extending north towards Colico. The original, older alignment runs parallel closer to the lake shore as a single-carriageway road, serving local coastal towns. The modern highway and the older route rejoin near Piantedo. From Chiavenna, the SS 36 designation continues, but the road becomes a two-lane mountain road climbing up to the Spluga Pass on the Swiss border.

== History ==
The name Nuova Valassina (New Valassina) stems from an earlier plan to create a modern highway connecting Erba with southern Brianza and Milan, generally following the Valassina valley and crossing the Lambro river. While the current SS 36 deviates from parts of this original plan, the name persists for the high-capacity section through Brianza.

The tunnel sections under Monte Barro and through Lecco city centre opened in 1999. The previous route from Civate passed through Valmadrera and Malgrate, crossing the Ponte Kennedy into Lecco.

== Viale Lombardia tunnel (Monza) ==
Since April 2013, the SS 36 passes through Monza via an urban tunnel beneath Viale Lombardia, approximately 1,800 metres long. As of 2016, the tunnel handled approximately 20 million vehicle transits annually.

Advocacy for the tunnel began around 1996, led by groups such as the "Comitato San Fruttuoso". The project was approved by the Ministry of Infrastructure and Transport in 2008. Construction began in January 2009 and was completed in April 2013. The project cost was reported as €330 million (later revised to €345 million), funded jointly by the Italian State, the Lombardy Region, the province of Monza and Brianza, the municipalities of Monza, Cinisello Balsamo, and Muggiò, and ALSI Spa (Acque Lombarde Sud Idropadana, the local water management company).

== Speed limits ==
The standard speed limit on the dual-carriageway sections of SS 36 is 90 km/h. However, it is reduced to 70 km/h on the segment between Abbadia Lariana and Lecco. Limits vary on the urban sections and the two-lane mountain section north of Chiavenna.

== Route ==
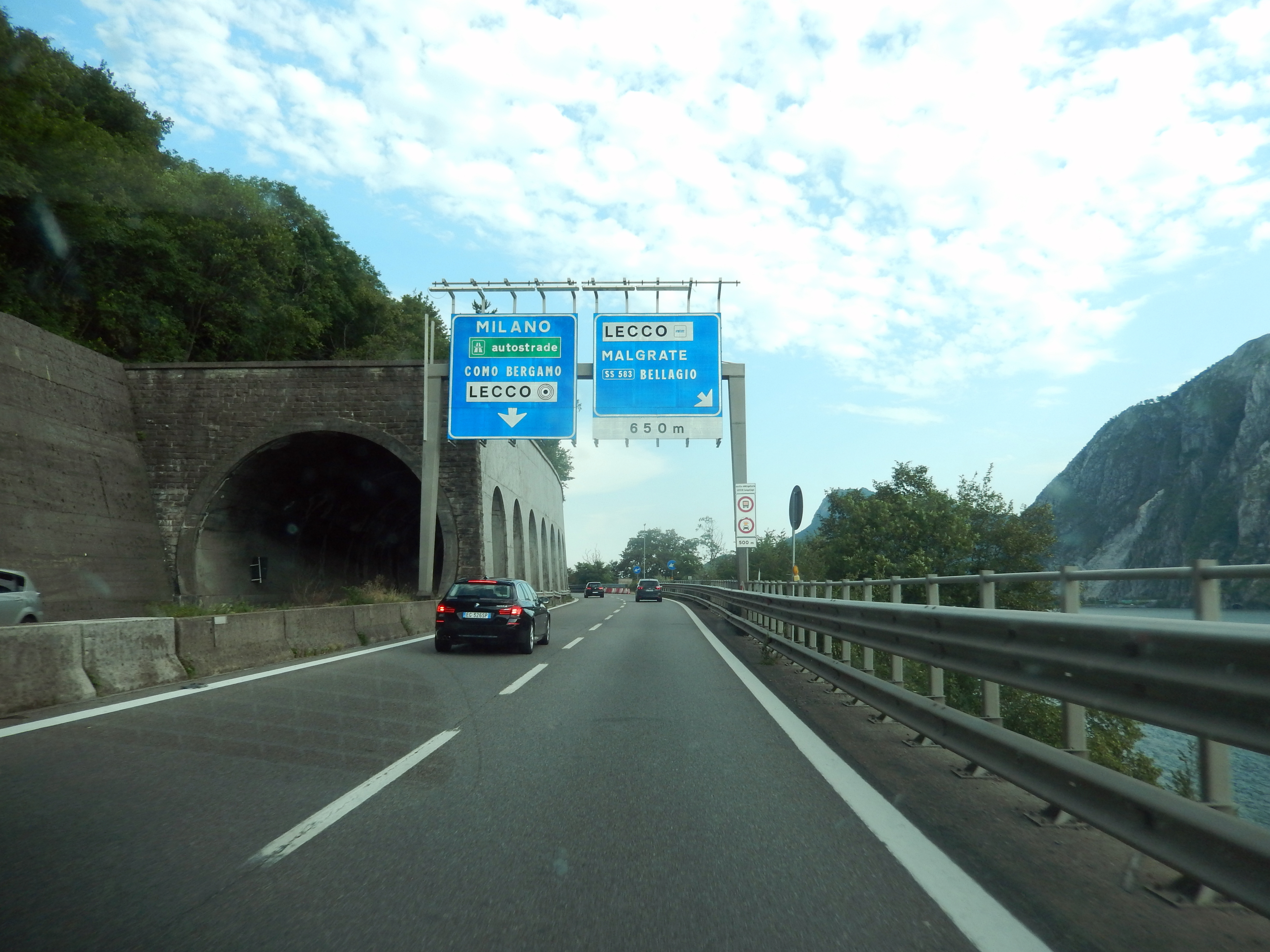
Strada statale 36 del Lago di Como e dello Spluga in Lecco

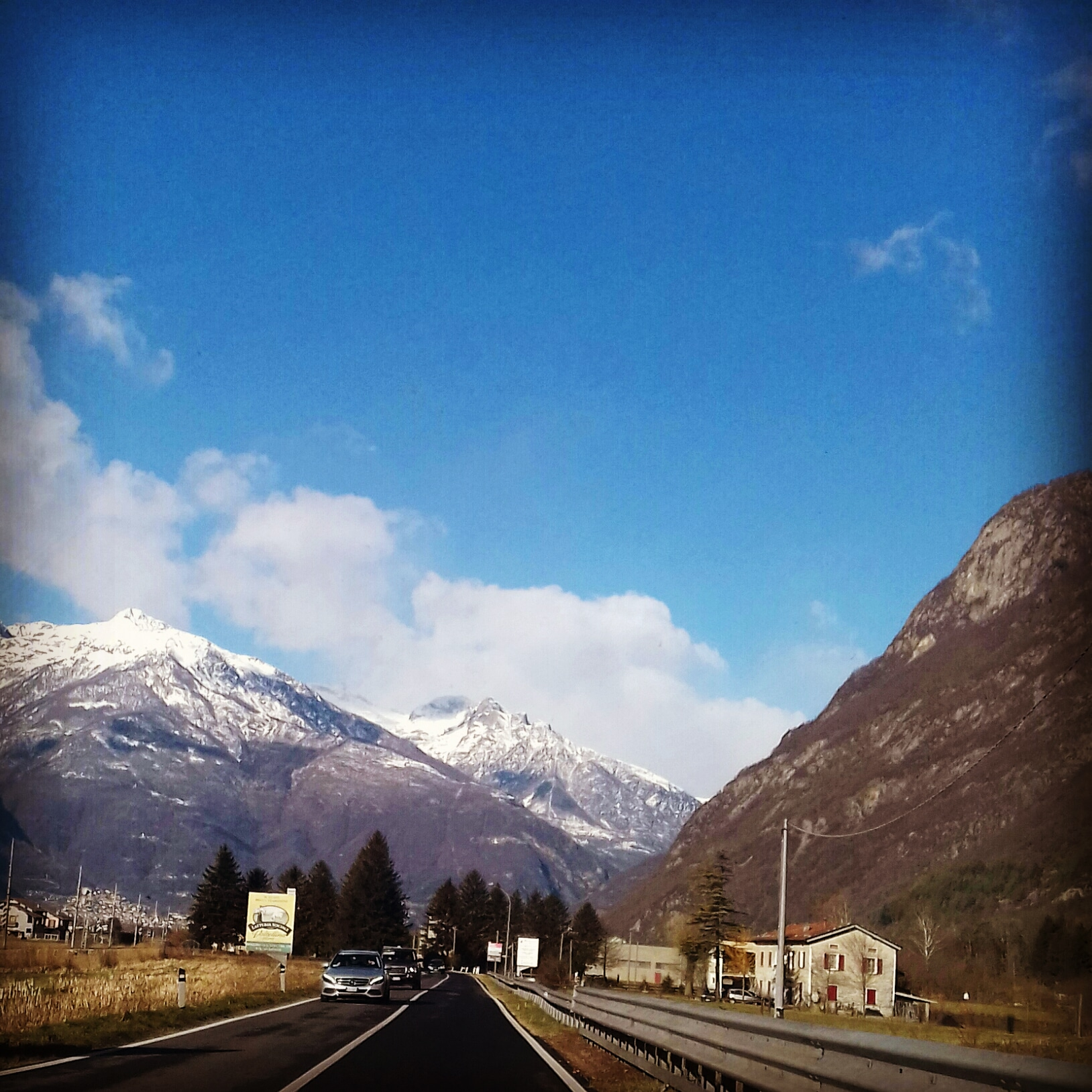
Strada statale 36 del Lago di Como e dello Spluga in Chiavenna

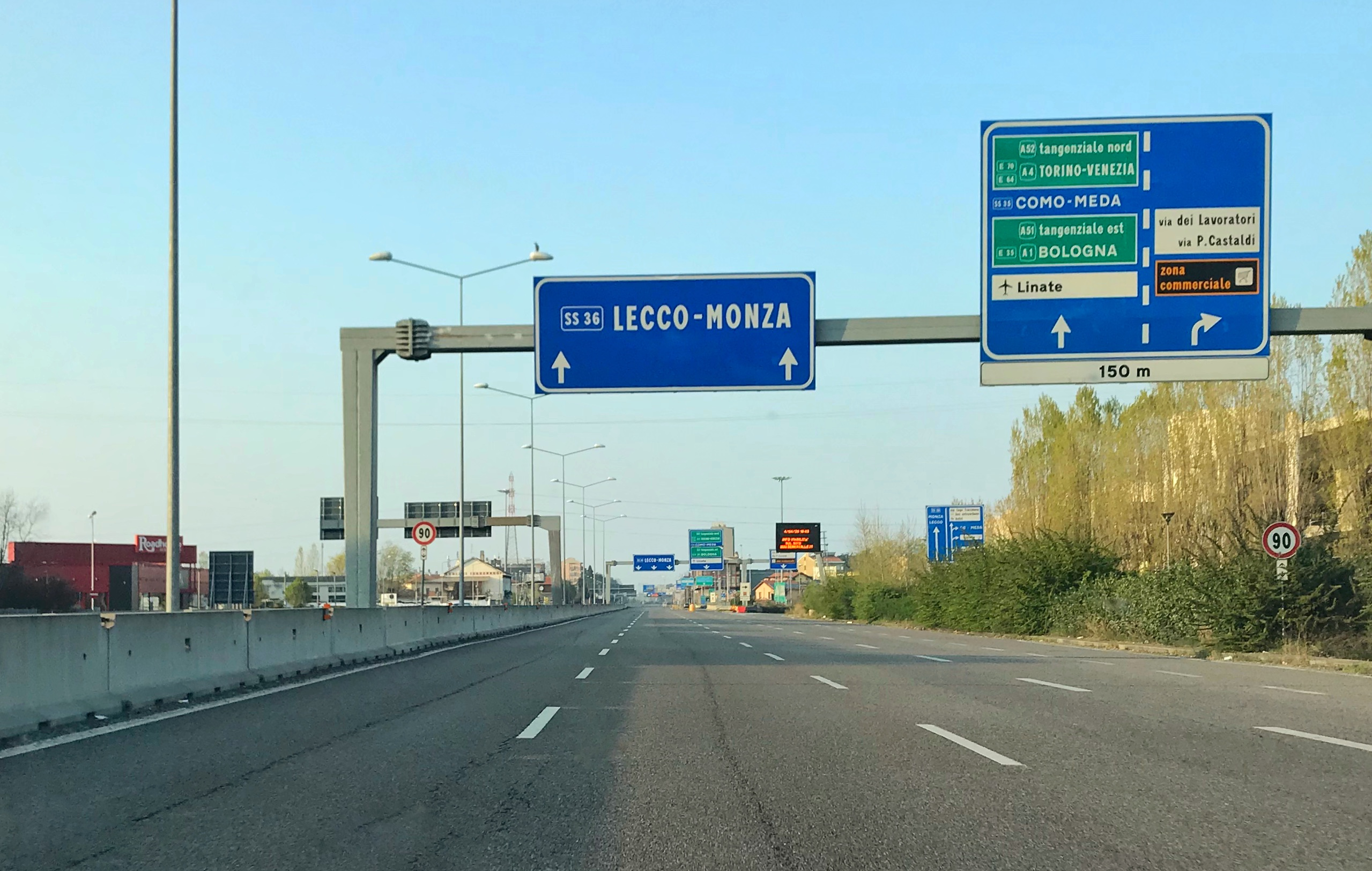
Strada statale 36 del Lago di Como e dello Spluga in Cinisello Balsamo

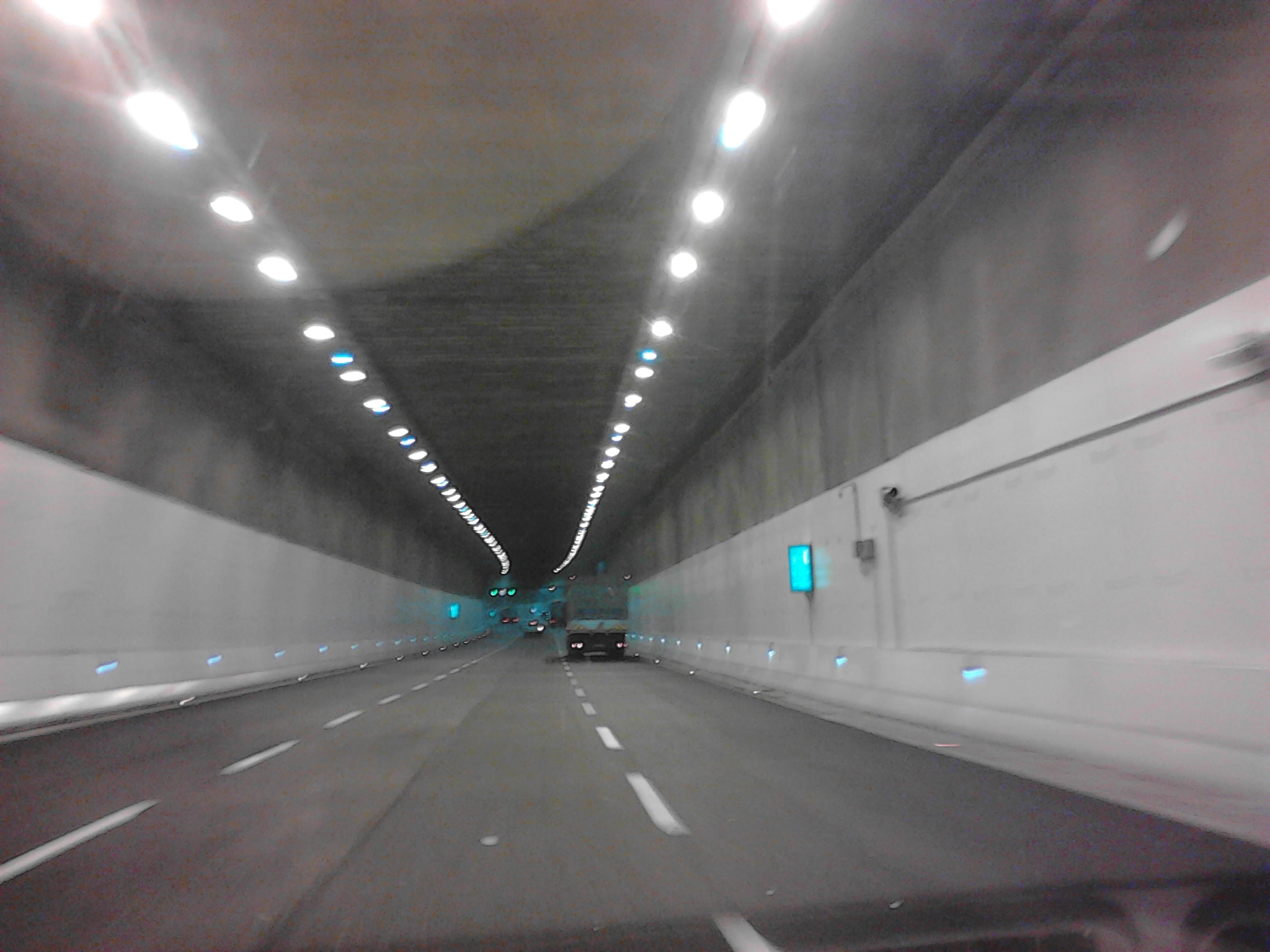
Strada statale 36 del Lago di Como e dello Spluga in Monza

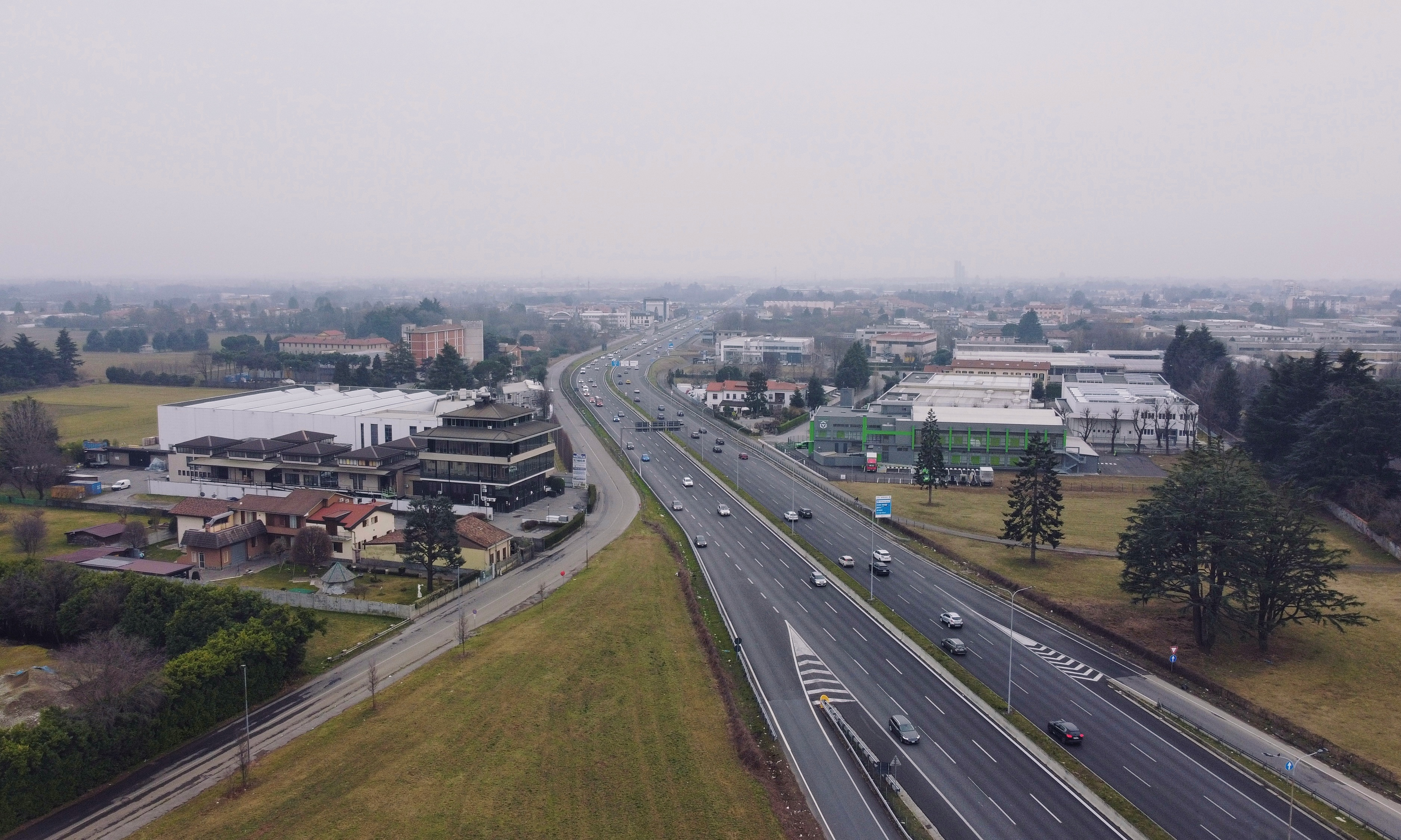
Strada statale 36 del Lago di Como e dello Spluga in Carate Brianza

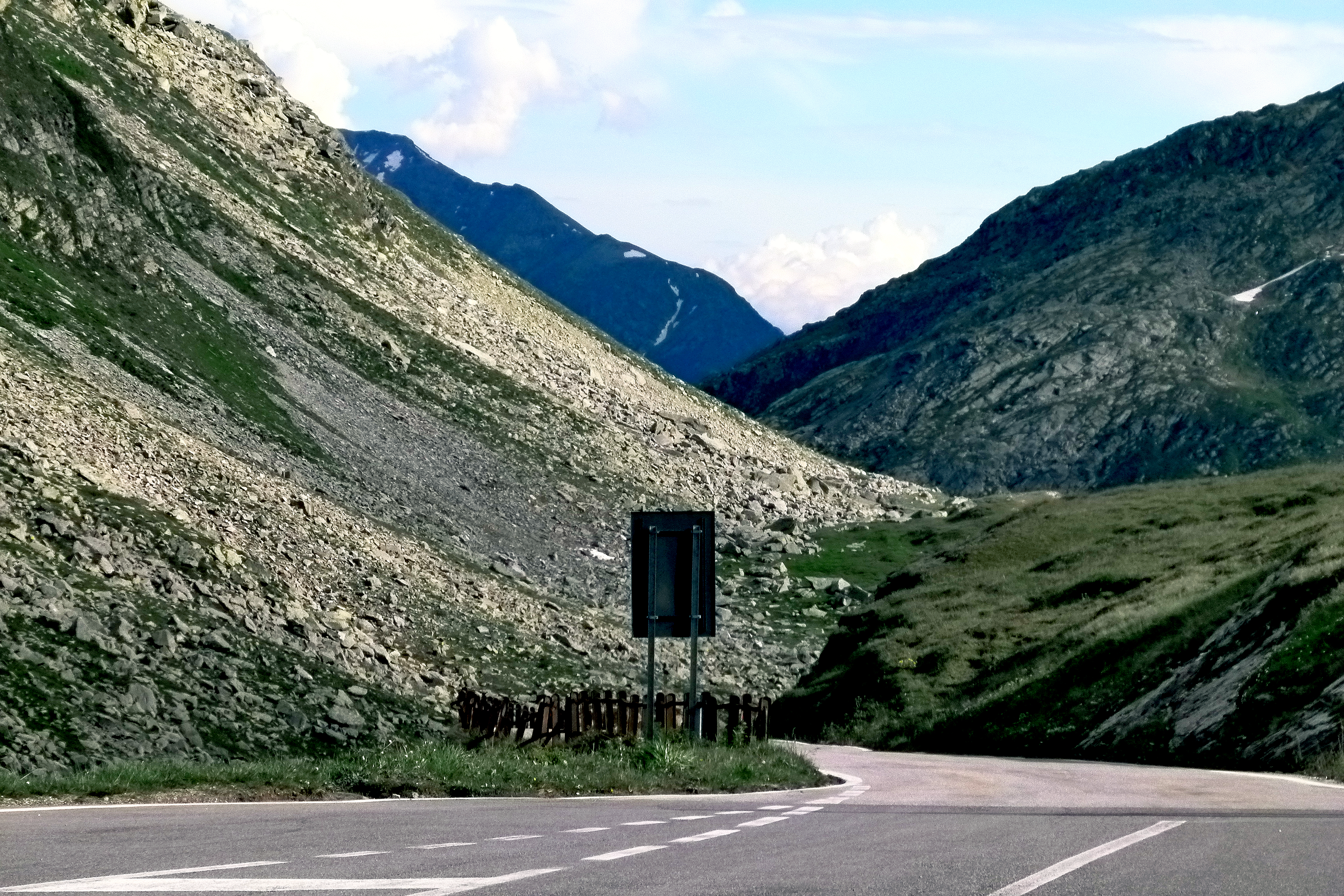
Strada statale 36 del Lago di Como e dello Spluga near the Splügen Pass

del Lago di Como e dello Spluga; Superstrada Milano-Lecco-Colico
Exit	↓km↓	Province
Monza autodromo	0.0 km (0 mi)	MB
Lissone sud	0.5 km (0.31 mi)	MB
Muggiò	1.5 km (0.93 mi)	MB
Lissone centro	2.5 km (1.6 mi)	MB
Desio	4.0 km (2.5 mi)	MB
Lissone nord - Seregno sud	6.0 km (3.7 mi)	MB
Seregno	7.5 km (4.7 mi)	MB
Carate Brianza	9.2 km (5.7 mi)	MB
Verano Brianza sud	10.9 km (6.8 mi)	MB
Giussano–Erba	11.8 km (7.3 mi)	MB
Verano Brianza nord	12.8 km (8.0 mi)	MB
Arosio - Briosco	15.9 km (9.9 mi)	MB
Fornaci	17.0 km (10.6 mi)	MB
Capriano	18.1 km (11.2 mi)	MB
Como–Bergamo - Nibionno	21.1 km (13.1 mi)	LC
Costa Masnaga	23.8 km (14.8 mi)	LC
Molteno	25.1 km (15.6 mi)	LC
Bosisio Parini	28.4 km (17.6 mi)	LC
Annone	30.1 km (18.7 mi)	LC
Suello–Erba	31.6 km (19.6 mi)	LC
Civate	34.1 km (21.2 mi)	LC
Olginate; Briantea Garlate	38.1 km (23.7 mi)	LC
Lecco Bione	39.1 km (24.3 mi)	LC
Lecco Ospedale - Valsassina sud	39.6 km (24.6 mi)	LC
Lecco Centro	40.7 km (25.3 mi)	LC
Lecco Lungolago	45.9 km (28.5 mi)	LC
Abbadia Lariana	48.4 km (30.1 mi)	LC
Bellano - Valsassina nord	71.4 km (44.4 mi)	LC
Dervio - Val Varrone	75.9 km (47.2 mi)	LC
Piona	81.4 km (50.6 mi)	LC
Colico dello Stelvio Sondrio - Passo dello Stelvio	87.4 km (54.3 mi)	LC

== See also ==
- State highways (Italy)
- Roads in Italy
- Transport in Italy

=== Other Italian roads ===
- Autostrade of Italy
- Regional road (Italy)
- Provincial road (Italy)
- Municipal road (Italy)
