= Lake of Pusiano =

Lake in Italy

Lake Pusiano
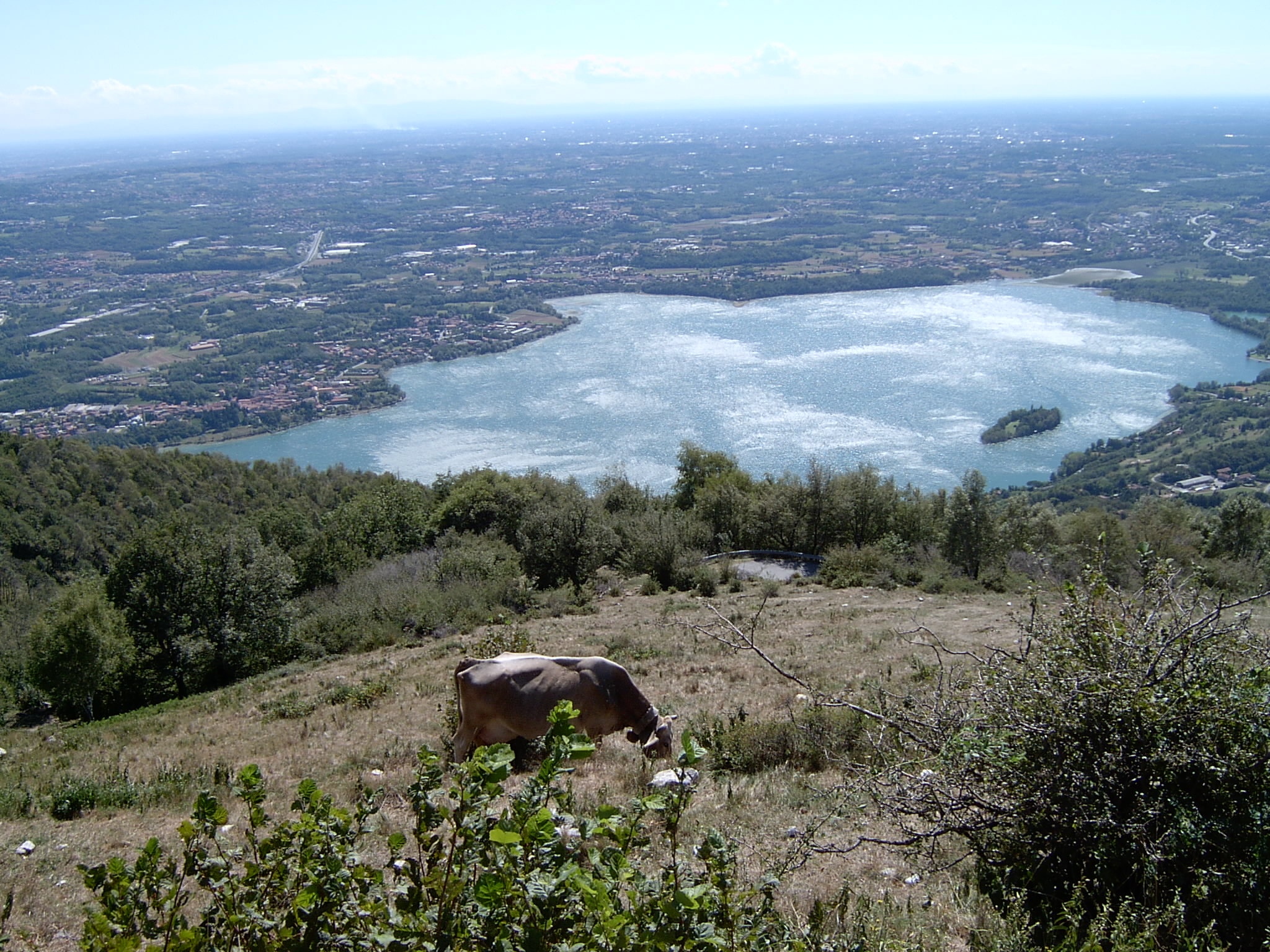
- View from Monte Cornizzolo

- Location within Lombardy

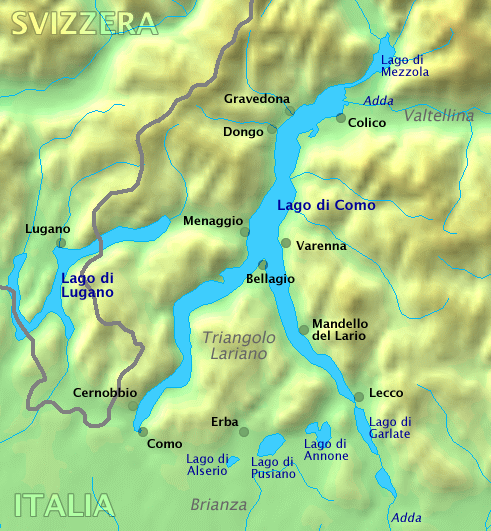
- Location: Lombardy, Italy
- Coordinates: 45.8°N 9.27°E
- Primary inflows: Lambro
- Primary outflows: Lambro
- Basin countries: Italy
- Surface area: 5.25 km^{2} (2.03 sq mi)
- Max. depth: 27 m (89 ft)
- Surface elevation: 257 m (843 ft)
- Islands: Isola dei Cipressi
- Settlements: Pusiano

Lake Pusiano, also called Casletto or Eupili (Lagh de Pusian in Lombard, Lacus Pusianum in Latin), is a lake located between the provinces of Como and Lecco, in Brianza, Lombardy.

In his honor Giuseppe Parini published his first book of poems (of arcane tone), under the pseudonym of Ripano Eupilino.

The painter Giovanni Segantini painted Lake Pusiano in his famous painting Ave Maria a trasbordo, which is among the first that mark the evolution towards pointillism.

== Hydrography ==
Lake Pusiano is the largest of the Lakes Briantei, has a maximum length of 2,700 meters, a width of 2,400 meters, a perimeter of about 11 kilometers, a minimum area (in lean times) of 5,250,000 square meters that reaches 6,720,000 square meters in times of flood. The volume of water is 81 million cubic meters.

Lake Pusiano, like the other lakes of the Brianza area, was formed after the withdrawal of the huge glacier that covered much of the Brianza area and is therefore of glacial origin.

Initially, it formed a whole together with Lake Alserio, only in more recent times they separated due to the accumulation of sediment brought by the Lambro River and human activity of reclamation.

Its emissary is the Lambro, which is also the tributary with the name of Lambrone. Since 1811 the lake is regulated at the outlet to the valley of the Lambro through a dam, Cavo Diotti, now managed by the Regional Park of the Lambro Valley. On the banks of this stretch of water are the municipalities of Pusiano, Eupilio, Erba and Merone in the province of Como, Cesana Brianza, Bosisio Parini and Rogeno in the province of Lecco. Not far from Pusiano, in the territory entirely of Lecco there is another mirror of water a little more extensive called Lake Annone, from the town of Annone di Brianza.

=== Islands ===
In the lake there is the small Island of Cypresses, of private property. It is an oval-shaped islet that is located inside the lake of Pusiano. It owes its name to the presence of about 130 Cypresses, some of which are centuries old.

Its history has distant origins and dates back to the Neolithic (10-15000 BC), here the primitives built on the southern side of the island a small village made of stilts.

From the Middle Ages, until the seventeenth century, it was connected to the history of Lake Pusiano and therefore became the property of the archbishop of Milan, then the Carpani lords (local feudal lords) and finally became the island of the Viceroys, from Archduke Ferdinand Charles of Habsburg Este Lorraine to Archduke Ranieri of Habsburg, passing through Eugene de Beauharnais. It remained the property of the Austrian imperial house until about 1831. They housed in a historic palace in the village, known as the Beauharnais Palace, and used the island for their own pastimes.

It was sold in 1874 to the brothers Antonio and Egidio Gavazzi, industrialists from Valmadrera. Today the island, a destination for guided tours and location for weddings or events, retains the charm of a private oasis and is particularly known for the presence of particular botanical species and exotic animals including wallabies, Crowned cranes, peacocks and Storks.

== History ==
=== Prehistory ===
The roots of the lake "Eupili" go back to prehistoric times, to go back from the Romans to modern times with the eighteenth-century villas, places of "delights" for numerous artists such as Parini, Monti, Porta, Manzoni, Stendhal and Segantini. In his honor the most illustrious son, Giuseppe Parini, published his first book of poems (of arcade tone), under the pseudonym Ripano Eupilino.

=== Ancient history ===
The first testimony about the lake is however, in 70 A.D., that of Caius Pliny the Second (born in Como in 23 A.D. and died in Stabia on 70 A.D.), known as Pliny the Elder, who in his "Naturalis historia", a very important work in 37 volumes refers to the main lakes in Lombardy mentioning the lake of "Eupili". A quotation from which it is possible to deduce the fact that, in the past centuries, the extension of the lake basin had to be greater than the present one, otherwise, in fact, it would have never been mentioned. It was therefore an important lake that stood alongside the Lario (Lake Como), Verbano (Lake Maggiore), the Benaco (Lake Garda) and Sebino (Lake Iseo).

=== Medieval history ===
Lake Pusiano (also called lacus pusianum) is written for the first time in an official way in a document dating back to 1314, which regularizes the division of the basin by deed: 2/3 become the responsibility of the archbishop of Milan and his canteen for the needy, 1/3 remains of the collegiate church of San Giovanni Battista of Monza.

Numerous changes of ownership have characterized the lake over the centuries. In 1483, the archbishop of Milan granted the lease of the lake to a private family asking, however, in exchange for a fee in money and imposing the obligation to provide a certain amount of fish to the archbishop's canteen in time of Lent.

Several times, during the 1500s, Lake Pusiano was considered an important pawn for the creation of a network of navigation within the Milanese territory, so as to navigate from Brianza to Milan. In fact, under the Visconti and Sforza, dealt with the problem illustrious figures including Leonardo da Vinci, in the period in which he was at the Court of Ludovico il Moro.

=== Modern and contemporary history ===
Particularly important for the development of the lake is the arrival, in 1550, of the Carpani family who, despite appeals, lawsuits and legal battles, will remain the owner from 1588 to 1765 when a new change of ownership will anticipate the arrival of the French. For imperial prerogative, the basin became Napoleonic heritage. Here he wanted to spend his vacations Eugene of Beauharnais, viceroy of the Napoleonic Kingdom of Italy, hence the current name of the palace located in Pusiano. Legend has it that this palace was preferred to others because here it was possible to reach the bedroom without getting off the horse; this was due to the real need to avoid the shooting of any attackers: the quicker the entrance, the less time to take aim.

The story also tells that in 1816 the mechanic Locatelli performed the first experiment of the "inaufragabile naviglio", in all probability a boat equipped with special technical instruments that made it particularly resistant in case of rain or storms. Of the test, however, do not remain information handed down in written form. It is certain, however, that in 1820, on Lake Pusiano was seen the first steamboat in Italy, an experiment that the Austrians, new rulers of the time, did soon sunset suspecting that behind that action there was a lair of carbonari.

Dates back to 1870 the new passage of ownership of the lake to the city of Bosisio, until the advent of the company "Owners Lake Pusiano and annexes" which took over the ownership of the lake and its dependencies. So until 1922 when the Italian waters became state property as per governmental decree issued by Benito Mussolini, in 1928 were then attributed to the owners the rights of "fishing, navigation, making ice, cutting of bones and aquatic plants."

Over the years, several plans have been drawn up to try to solve the problem of water pollution; several checks and inspections have been made that led to the disclosure of a study, in 1995, on the damage of motor navigation on Lake Pusiano, the non-damage of seaplanes and oxygenation of water. In the same year the abolition of hunting on the lake came into force and the increase of ducks, coots, moorhens and mallards. Throughout these years, the pollution situation on the lake has improved.

The current ownership of the rights of Lake Pusiano is of the company Sweet Home owned by Egidio Motta who gave in concession to Egirent Services Srl the Management of fishing, navigation, ice production, cutting of bones (reeds) and aquatic plants. Egirent Service is responsible for carrying out the ichthyogenic works in agreement with the provinces of Lecco and Como, as well as the cleaning, control and supervision of the whole lake. From the shore of Bosisio it is possible to make a characteristic tour through the use of a municipal boat.

== Legends ==
Lake Pusiano is also linked to the story of Angela and Teresa Isacchi, two visionaries who in the second half of the 19th century became the destination of pilgrimages not only from Lombardy, but from the whole of Italy and from European nobles in transit. According to legend, some of their meditations, the result of direct talks with the Blessed Virgin Mary, were reported on books particularly popular until the beginning of the '900. History tells us that they predicted the fall of the Austro-Hungarian Empire and the end of the temporal power of the Church, both of which occurred within a short time.

== Fishing ==
As wanted by Egirent Service srl, fishing in Lake Pusiano is strictly no kill. The lake, however, is recognized as a European excellence in fishing, in fact, as surveyed by the Regional Park of the Lambro Valley, there are about 25 species of ichthyofauna present today. The lake, also hosts an abundant amount of fish of various qualities, with the great diffusion of carp, pike, but especially perch.

The town of Pusiano, in fact, is known for the preparation of the famous "risotto" with perch, now become a typical dish. The recipe calls for white rice combined with breaded fish with egg and breadcrumbs and fried in plenty of oil and butter.

On Lake Pusiano you can also try the experience of enjoying the view from another perspective, sailing aboard the motorboat Enigma, solar-powered boat.

== Sports ==
In addition to fishing, Lake Pusiano is known to be a real natural gym for rowing. Its calm waters host two rowing centers where even Olympic champions from the Netherlands, Germany and Switzerland use for their training.
