= Cesana Brianza =

Cesana Brianza Cesana Briànsa (Lombard)
- Comune
- Comune di Cesana Brianza
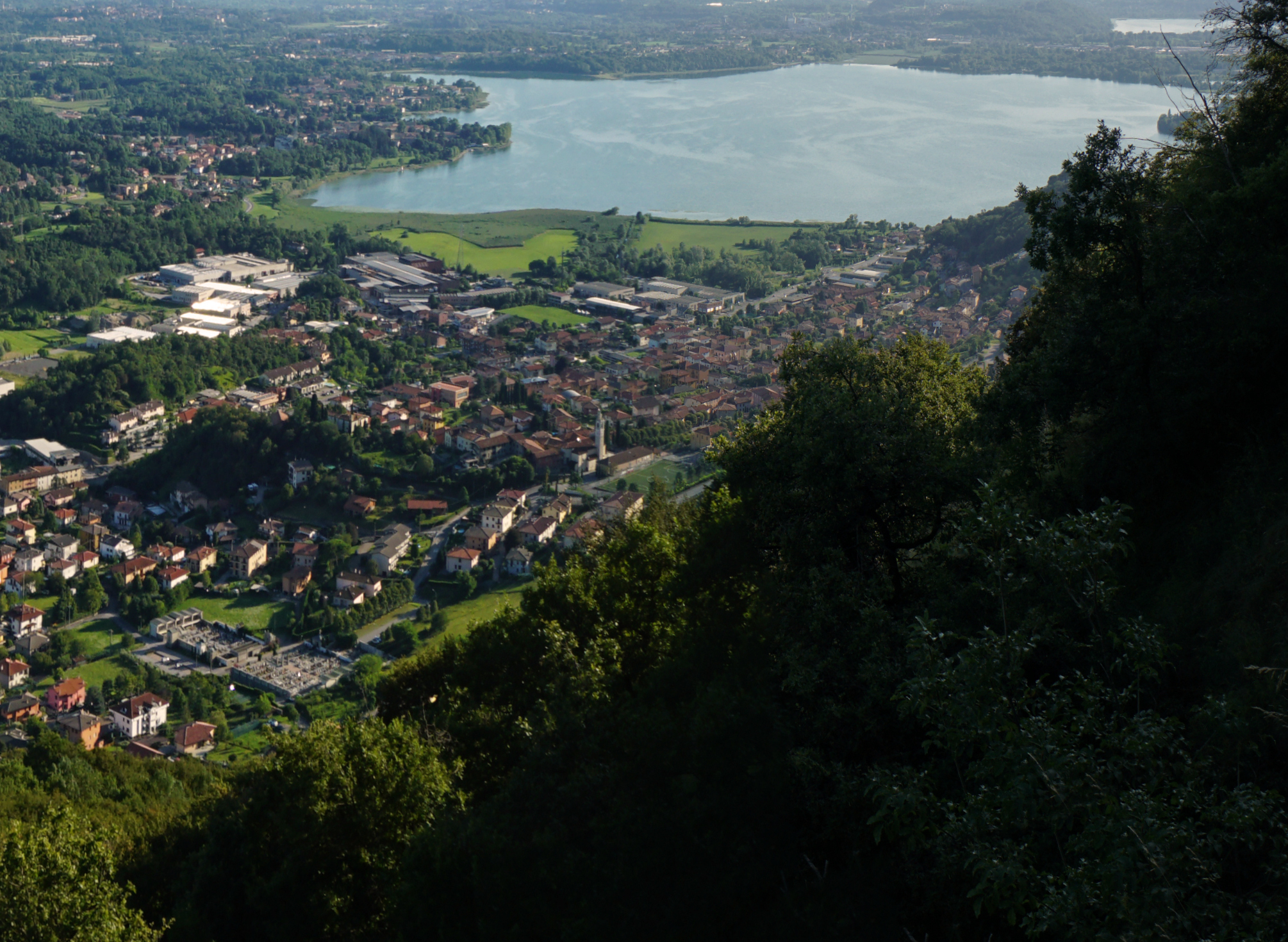
- Cesana Brianza and Lake of Pusiano

- Location within Italy Location within Lombardy
- Coordinates: 45°49′N 9°18′E
- Country: Italy
- Region: Lombardy
- Province: Province of Lecco (LC)

Area
  - Total: 3.4 km^{2} (1.3 sq mi)
- Elevation: 300 m (980 ft)

Population (Dec. 2004)
  - Total: 2,257
  - Density: 660/km^{2} (1,700/sq mi)
- Time zone: UTC+1 (CET)
  - Summer (DST): UTC+2 (CEST)
- Postal code: 22030
- Dialing code: 031

Cesana Brianza is a municipality of 2,393 inhabitants in the Province of Lecco in Lombardy, about 40 kilometres (25 mi) north of Milan and 9 kilometres (5.6 mi) southwest of Lecco.

The territory of Cesana Brianza is located near Lake Pusiano, located on the southern slope of Mount Cornizzolo, belonging to the so-called "Larian Triangle". It is part of the Mountain Community Lario Orientale – Valle San Martino.

Cesana Brianza borders the following municipalities: Annone di Brianza, Bosisio Parini, Canzo, Civate, Eupilio, Pusiano, Suello.

== Territory ==
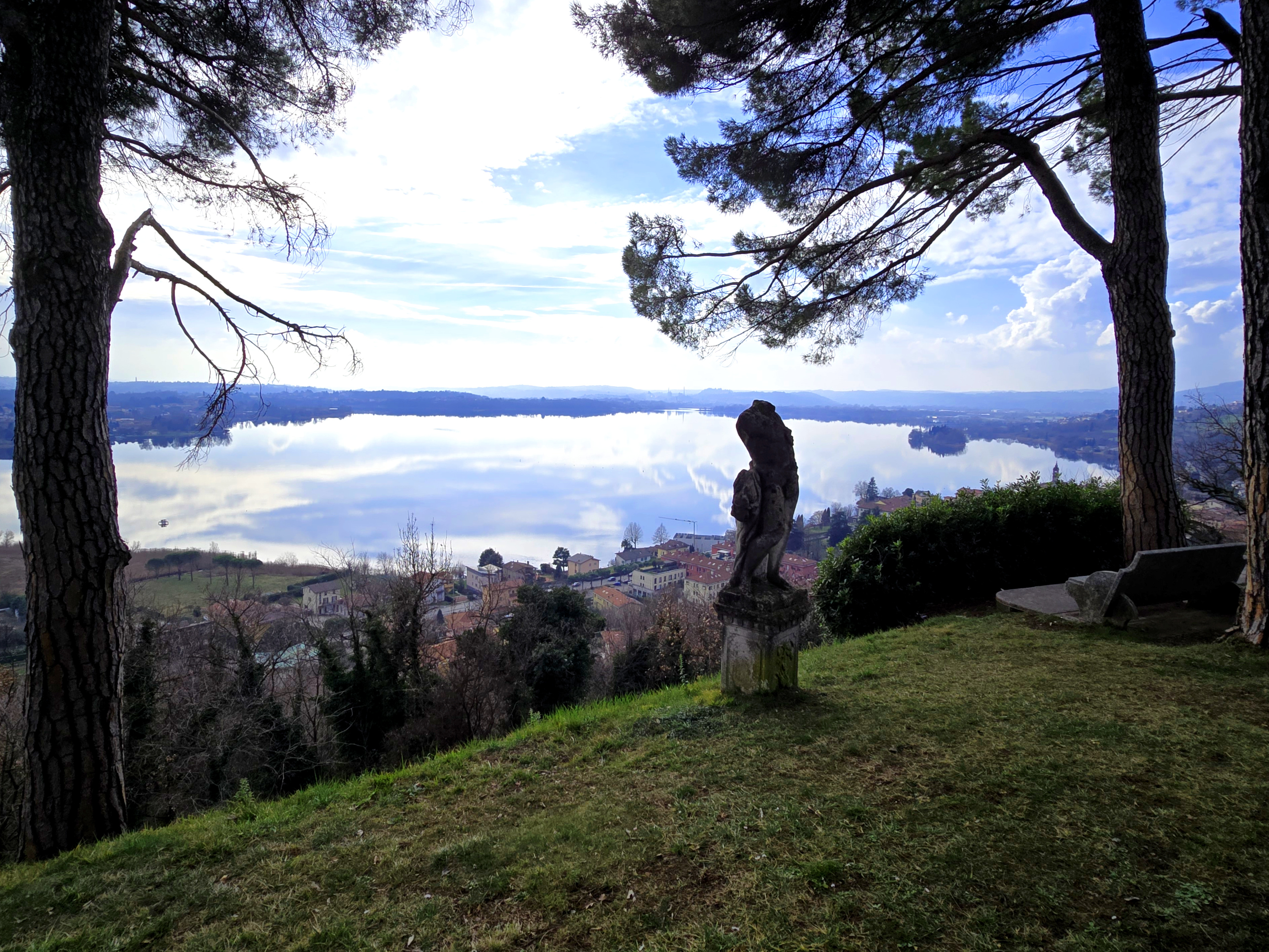
Lake Pusiano, seen from Parco del Roccolo

The territory of Cesana Brianza extends between the lakes of Pusiano and Annone and is located on the southern slope of Mount Cornizzolo ("Cornizzola" or "Corniscioeula"), one of the many mountains belonging to the Larian Triangle and geologically to the Southern Alps. The municipal territory is the result of continuous geological transformations. In fact, the land is not equally uniform: stretches of land of marine origin are flanked by others of continental origin and others of glacial or morainic origin.

The Cesanese countryside presents a poor and permeable soil made fertile by the continuous works of human reclamation and therefore now productive of any crop. Until a few decades ago, the cutting of hay, the breeding of livestock, the cultivation of Vines and mulberry trees and, to a lesser extent, the harvesting of Cereals constituted the prevalent resources of the municipality, demonstrating the agricultural reality of Cesana Brianza. Today, however, maximum productivity comes from the industrial sector, while the agricultural crops of mulberry and vine have almost entirely disappeared, so that the extremely fractionated land ownership now serves only to ensure a little green.

Particularly known is the Municipal Park "Roccolo" of Cesana Brianza, located in a hilly position with a view of Lake Pusiano.

== Name origin ==
The toponym Cesana derives from Caesiana rura (or Caesiana Villa, domus, turris, colonia). It can be assumed, therefore, that the origin of the name would derive from a Latin adjective obtained by the application of the suffix -ianus, -iana to the Roman noble name Caesius, precisely Caesiana. The toponym Cesana is very common throughout Italy (Cesana Torinese, Cesana fraction of Varese Ligure, Cesana near Feltre, but also Cisano Bergamasco etc.).

In all these cases, the place names derive from various possessions of families of the people "Caesia", very numerous and powerful especially in imperial times.

The municipality changed its name from 1927 to 1955 when it was merged with the neighboring municipality of Suello, thus giving life to the municipality of Cesello Brianza. Today it is recognized as Cesana Brianza.

== History ==
The history of Cesana Brianza has ancient origins dating back to ancient Rome. The first documentation of this place dates back to the famous and ancient Tabula Peutingeriana. In fact, the development of the road network facilitated the process of Romanization of the Po Valley, and on the route of an ancient Roman road rose the village of Cesana. This road connected the great roads of Venice with the so-called "Via del Reno", which led to Germany in the region of the Upper Rhine and Upper Danube, passing through Como, Chiavenna, the Spluga Pass and finally Chur.

Cesana, in the Lombard age, from a simple and common military post became a real "castrum" or castle, with a guard tower and other annexed defense buildings.

During the disputes between Como and Milan, in 1162 the town saw the destruction of its defensive walls by Milan. At that time, the territory was a fief granted by Frederick Barbarossa to the abbot of San Pietro al Monte.

During the Duchy of Milan, under the Visconti–Sforza seigniory, the practice of feudalism returned in vogue. In fact, the territory was first feudalised to the Dal Verme, then to the Fregoso and finally to the Sfondrati during the Spanish domination.

From an ecclesiastical point of view, the town was for many centuries included in the Pieve d'Incino.

From 1927 to 1955 the municipality of Cesana Brianza was merged with Suello, giving birth to the municipality of Cesello Brianza, then belonging to the province of Como. In 1955 the municipality of Cesello Brianza was divided between the reconstituted municipalities of Cesana Brianza and Suello.

== Monuments and places of interest ==
- Parish church of San Fermo, probably built at the end of the 9th century. In fact, the church of Saints Fermo and Rustico is listed among the dependencies of the Pieve d’Incino since the 13th century, while later it passed to the Pieve di Villincino (Erba). Parish of the diocese of Milan, it was rebuilt at the beginning of the 17th century to replace a previous church. Originally, it had a single nave, but it was later enlarged with the addition of two side aisles. The church was consecrated in 1615 by Cardinal Federico Borromeo. Geographically it is located in the inhabited center of the town in a raised position with respect to the square that hosts it. The front is divided into three large parts. The inside of the church is divided into three Naves by pillars, the lateral ones end with the respective chapels dedicated to the Holy Crucifix and to the Madonna del Rosario. The central nave, instead, ends with the triumphal arch. The cult of Saints Fermo and Rustico presumably dates back to the year 760, at the time of the Lombard king Desiderio. In fact, at the beginning, Cesana Brianza depended completely on the Pieve d'Incino, both for the civil and the religious administration. Later, with the arrival in the town of the first Christians, probably coming from Verona, it came to build real Christian sacred buildings and it is interesting to note that the ancient buildings of worship in Cesana were dedicated to saints from Verona: Martyred Saints Fermo and Rustico. It is interesting to remember that the soldiers Fermo and Rustico, originally from Bergamo, were killed on 9 August 304 by order of the Emperor Maximian because of their Christian faith. In fact, today 9 August is the patronal feast day for the people of Cesana.
- Sanctuary of the Madonna del Carmelo ("Oratorio del Santisimo Rosaii" as the stone inscription dated 1704 and positioned above the entrance portal reads). Originally the Oratory was built to be the seat of the Confraternity of the Holy Rosary, constituted in the year 1592 in the parish of Cesana and Suello. The members, not having a real seat where to meet, decided to build the building at their own expenses. However, towards the end of the 18th century, Emperor Joseph II of Austria, Duke of Milan, ordered the suppression of the existing Confraternities in the parishes. The parish priest of Cesana at that time, Carlo Alfonso De La Hoz, took the opportunity to apply for a "change of use" of the building, from a place of worship to a house at the service of the parish house, although, continuous pleas from the parishioners managed to block this initiative. A few years later, with the entrance of Napoleon Bonaparte in Milan and with the death of the parish priest De La Hoz in 1797, the people elected the priest Carlo Castelnuovo as the new parish priest of San Fermo. Following the Napoleonic requisitions, the Oratory also ended up in the list of the many vacant ecclesiastical properties and General Giuseppe De La Hoz, nephew of the recently deceased parish priest, asked and obtained the acquisition of the church through his attorney, Leone Viterbi. After the death of General De La Hoz, the oratory of Cesana passes fully into the hands of Viterbi, but he, without delay sells the building at the price of one thousand liras to the Milanese gentlemen Castelnuovo Giovan Maria and Conti Giuseppe Antonio. However, they are only front men: the real buyer is the Cesanese don Carlo Castelnuovo, brother of Giambattista, bishop of Como. From this date the church is definitively assured to the parishioners of Cesana, who will become the owners by inheritance. The Lords Conti and Castelnuovo of Milan, who became the owners of the Oratory, brought there a statue to dress and wanted it to be dressed in the figure of the Madonna like the one they venerated in the central Parish of Santa Maria del Carmine in Milan. Since then, the ancient Madonna del Carmelo is imposed in the church. In the alternate historical events of the Sanctuary, the constant datum is the popular devotion to the Virgin Mary. The liturgical feast of Our Lady of Mount Carmel is celebrated on 16 July.

== Coat of arms ==
The coat of arms of Cesana Brianza was adopted in February 1895 on a project of the publisher Vallardi and describes the Roman origins and the medieval traditions of this town. In heraldic terms, it can be described as follows: "silver to the Roman aqueduct in red planted on a green lawn, surmounted by the Visconti Biscione". The presence of the "biscione visconteo" probably alludes to the fact that in Cesana the archbishop Visconti had established the seminary of San Fermo, then suppressed in 1596 by cardinal Borromeo.

== Ancient noble families of Cesana ==
- The Cattaneo: family of ancient nobility, particularly in Cesana. In fact, they were the Capitanei or Valvassori in the service of Frederick Barbarossa and the Abbot of Civate. They were therefore the commanders of the military garrison of the castle of Cesana, or more simply the feudal lords or gentlemen of the country. Towards the middle of the fifteenth century, they abandoned all the prerogatives of military commanders and accepted from the Abbot of Civate the investiture of landowners of the farm of Cesana called La Fontana, and from that moment left the civil administration of the town to the Mauri and Gerosa.
- The Mauri: they were Ghibellines, originally from the town of Eupilio, and quickly spread throughout the Duchy of Milan and throughout Italy. The Mauri of Cesana always had a dominant role in the government of the town.
- The Gerosa: family of Ghibelline origin, pursued by the Guelphs of Bergamo and forced to abandon their original seat in Imagna Valley, they sought hospitality in Brianza (traditionally Ghibelline) and especially in Cesana Brianza, where they constantly held public office. The main branch of this family had as last heir Maria Caterina Gerosa, founder of the Sisters of Charity.
- The Stefanoni: family adherent to the party of the Guelphs. It was persecuted by the Lord of Milan Barnabò Visconti, but its successor Gian Galeazzo Visconti granted it an amnesty and allowed it to regain possession of its goods and rights.

== Demographic evolution ==
- 335 in 1751
- 309 in 1771
- 446 in 1805
- 1,228 after annexation of Pusiano and Suello in 1809
- 592 in 1853
- 604 in 1862
- 790 in 1901
- 1,807 as Cesello Brianza in 1931
- 1,810 as Cesello Brianza in 1936
- 2,074 as Cesello Brianza in 1951
- 1,274 in 1961, the active population was 516: 31 agricultural workers and 430 industrial workers.
- 1,589 in 1971

Historical population

| Year | Pop. | ±% |
|---|---|---|
| 1861 | 633 | — |
| 1871 | 698 | +10.3% |
| 1881 | 742 | +6.3% |
| 1901 | 790 | +6.5% |
| 1911 | 982 | +24.3% |

| Year | Pop. | ±% |
|---|---|---|
| 1921 | 932 | −5.1% |
| 1931 | 961 | +3.1% |
| 1936 | 991 | +3.1% |
| 1951 | 1,134 | +14.4% |
| 1961 | 1,274 | +12.3% |

| Year | Pop. | ±% |
|---|---|---|
| 1971 | 1,589 | +24.7% |
| 1981 | 1,965 | +23.7% |
| 1991 | 2,205 | +12.2% |
| 2001 | 2,265 | +2.7% |

Source: Data from ISTAT
