= Annone =

Annone may refer to:

- Annone Veneto, town in the Metropolitan City of Venice, Veneto, northern Italy
- Annone di Brianza, a municipality in the Province of Lecco in the Italian region Lombardy
- Castello di Annone, a municipality in the Province of Asti in the Italian region Piedmont
- Lago di Annone, a lake in the Province of Lecco, Lombardy, Italy
