= Garbagnate =

Garbagnate may refer to:

- Garbagnate Milanese, a municipality in the province of Milan, Italy
- Garbagnate Monastero, a municipality in the province of Lecco, Italy
