= Molteno =

Molteno Moltee (Lombard)
- Comune
- Comune di Molteno

- Location within Italy Location within Lombardy
- Coordinates: 45°47′N 9°18′E
- Country: Italy
- Region: Lombardy
- Province: Lecco (LC)
- Frazioni: Gaesso, Molino, Luzzana, Raviola, Pascolo, Coroldo

Area
  - Total: 3.2 km^{2} (1.2 sq mi)

Population (December 2004)
  - Total: 3,206
  - Density: 1,000/km^{2} (2,600/sq mi)
- Demonym: Moltenesi
- Time zone: UTC+1 (CET)
  - Summer (DST): UTC+2 (CEST)
- Postal code: 23847
- Dialing code: 031
- Patron saint: San Giorgio
- Saint day: April 23
- Website: Official website

Molteno (Italian: [molˈteːno]; Brianzoeu: Moltee) is a comune (municipality) and a hill-top town in the Province of Lecco in the Italian region Lombardy, located about 35 kilometres (22 mi) northeast of Milan and about 11 kilometres (7 mi) southwest of Lecco. As of 31 December 2004, it had a population of 3,206 and an area of 3.2 square kilometres (1.2 mi^{2}).

== Geography ==
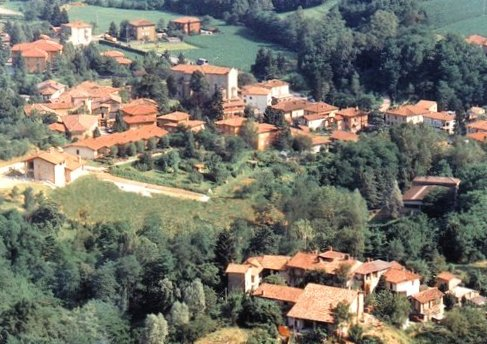
Villages on the hill-slopes of Molteno

The central feature of the area is the isolated hill, "Il Ceppo", on the top of which is the church of San Giorgio (patron saint of the region). The slopes around it are still partly covered in vines and mulberry trees.
The Molteno castle, which commanded the area from this hill in medieval times, no longer exists.

Molteno is also the meeting point of the two main rivers of the area, the Bevera and the smaller Gandaloglio.

The municipality of Molteno contains the frazioni (subdivisions, mainly villages) Gaesso, Molino, Luzzana, Raviola, Pascolo, and Coroldo.

Molteno borders the following municipalities: Annone di Brianza, Bosisio Parini, Costa Masnaga, Garbagnate Monastero, Oggiono, Rogeno, Sirone.

== History ==
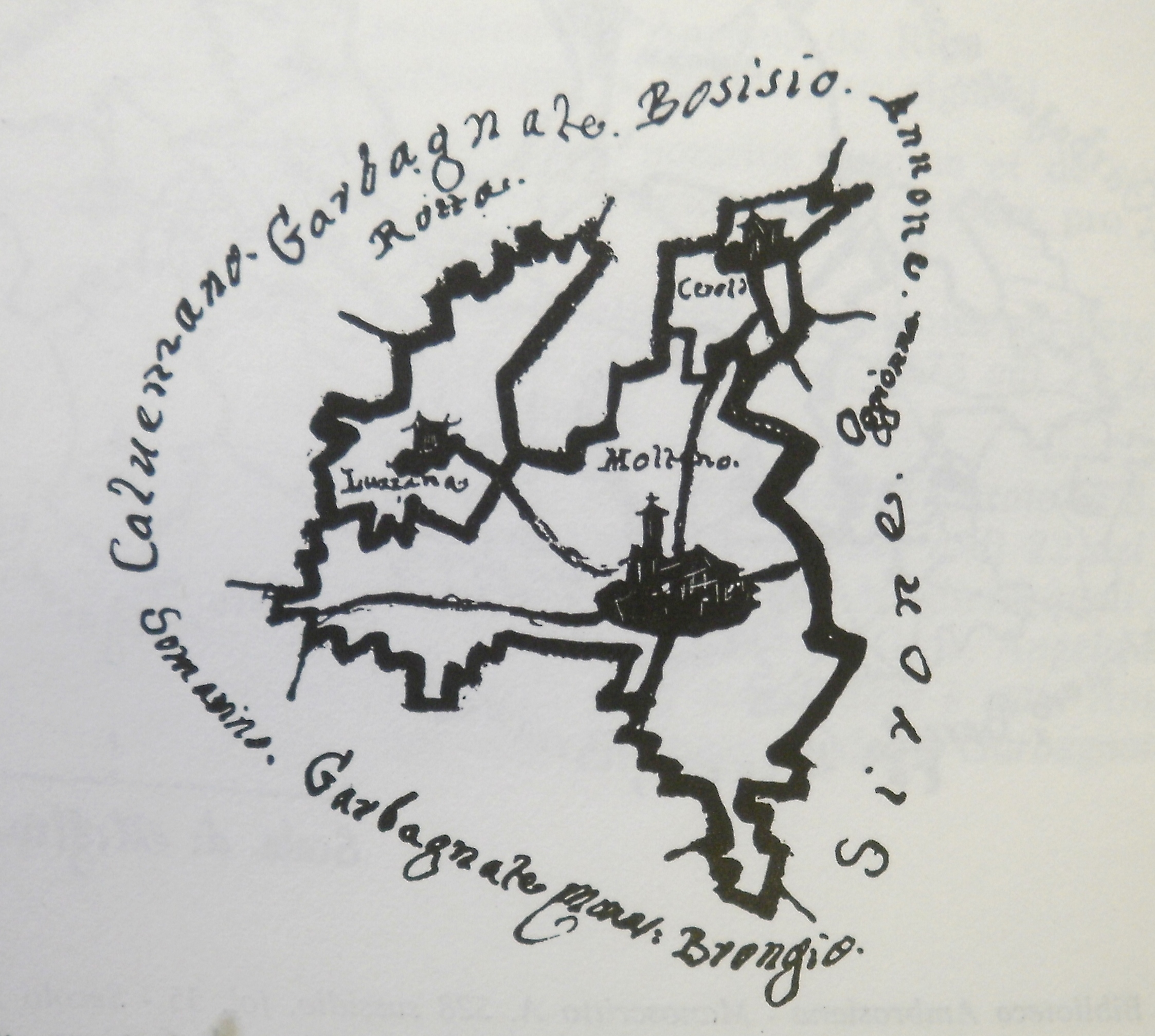
An 18th Century map of the Molteno comune, from the Biblioteca Ambrosiana in Milan.

Molteno was a Roman settlement, however it is not known by what name the settlement was called, nor whether the origins of the name "Molteno" stretch back that far. Nonetheless, numerous weapons, ceramics, tools, iron-ware, coins and even tombs have been found here from that period.

The area remained pagan relatively late. Christianity spread in the surrounding countryside from the end of the 5th century, and the first churches were built in the town only around the 6th century. After the collapse of the empire, the region fell into warring tribes which allied with the principal barbarian leaders, such as Uraias the Ostrogoth, who laid waste to Milan in 539. In 568 the Lombards entered northern Italy, giving the region its future name of Lombardy.

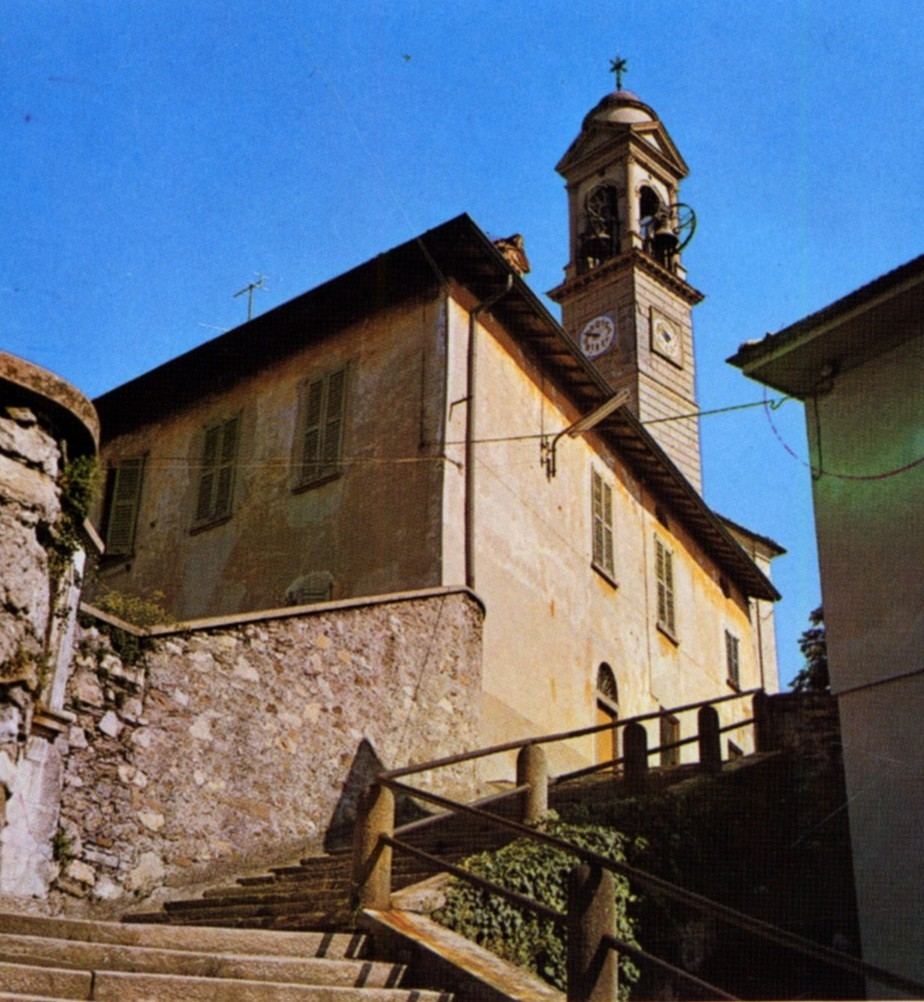
Stairway near the summit of Ceppo hill

Molteno's il Ceppo hill forms a natural fortress and medieval documents confirm that during the time of the Holy Roman Empire, Molteno was a castle, surrounded by fortifications that were later pulled down in peacetime (although the Piazza di Castello still marks the spot). Emperor Barbarossa of the Holy Roman Empire, in his long-running war against an alliance of powerful Italian city states, led several enormous armies through this region in order to attack Milan.

With the prosperity of the Renaissance, the republican city states ("Communi") of Italy came to be increasingly dominated by powerful families ("Signorie"). Molteno traditionally fell within the political orbit of Milan and as such was controlled by families like the Della Torres, the Visconti and the Sforza. Molteno's parent state was unique however, in that the Milanese Signoria of the Visconti family was recognized and controlled by a constitution.

Molteno, like the rest of the Brianza region, later saw the passing of numerous foreign administrations including the Spanish, the French and the Habsburgs before joining the insurrection that led to the unification of Italy.

== Culture and places of interest ==
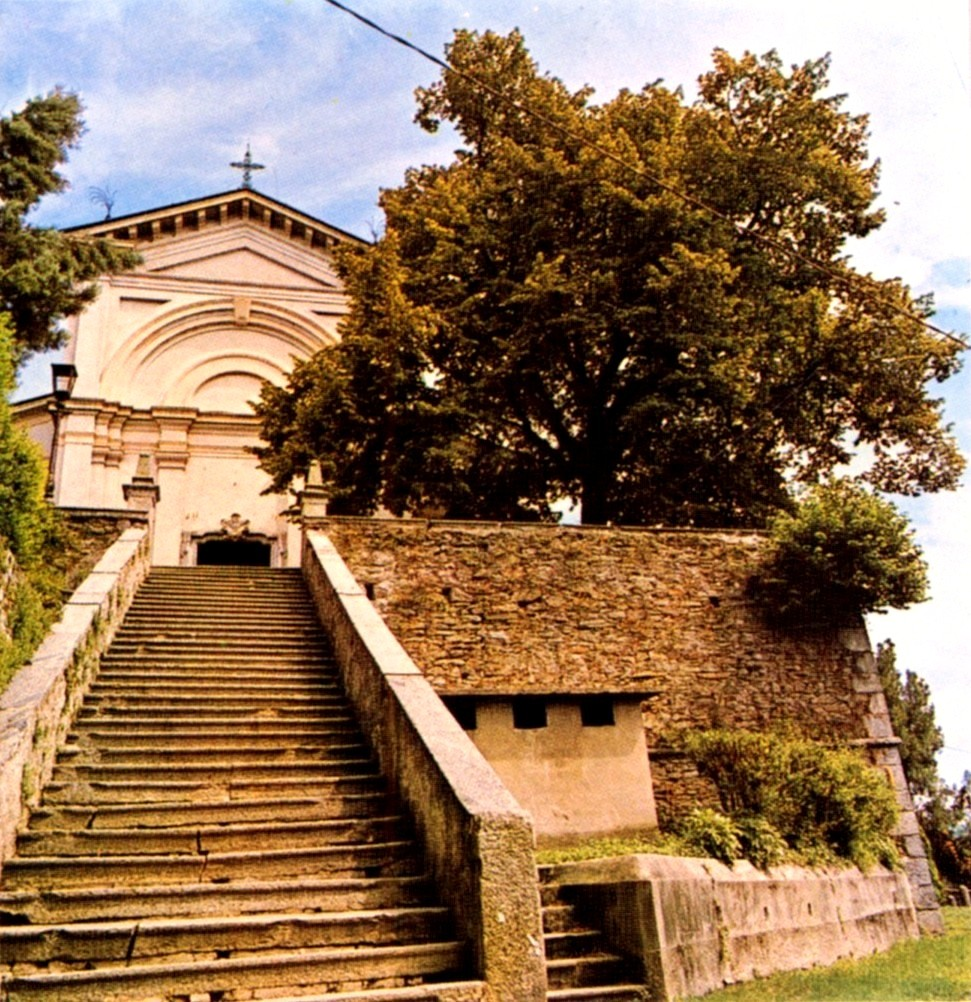
The Chiesa Parocchiale

The town hall of Molteno is situated within the park of Villa Rosa. The town centres around the Piazza Risorgimento, from which runs the street up to the Chiesa di San Giorgio on the top of Ceppo hill. From the forecourt and broad steps of the church it is possible to look southwards over a wide panorama of the countryside and of the hill country of the Brianza. The houses cluster in narrow, crooked streets around the slopes and the base of the hill. Another central feature of Molteno is Piazza Europa, which every Wednesday hosts the town market.

Local events include:

- San Rocco – Festival of the town's patron saint, August 16
- "Un’avventura, le Emozioni" festival – annual festival held in September in tribute to the famous Italian singer/songwriter Lucio Battisti, who lived in Molteno (1943–1998) and is buried nearby.

== Transport ==
The historic Molteno railway station (1888) is now an important centre of interchange in the Brianza region, between the Como–Lecco and the Monza–Molteno–Lecco lines.

The comune of Molteno is also crossed by the Strada statale 36 (SS 36) from Milan to Passo dello Spluga on the Swiss-Italian border.

== Demographics ==
Historical population

Year	Pop.	±%
1861	1,177	—
1871	1,307	+11.0%
1881	1,370	+4.8%
1901	1,613	+17.7%
1911	1,543	−4.3%

Year	Pop.	±%
1921	1,584	+2.7%
1931	1,808	+14.1%
1936	1,819	+0.6%
1951	1,978	+8.7%
1961	2,043	+3.3%

Year	Pop.	±%
1971	2,402	+17.6%
1981	2,616	+8.9%
1991	2,769	+5.8%
2001	3,094	+11.7%

Source: Data from ISTAT

== Images ==
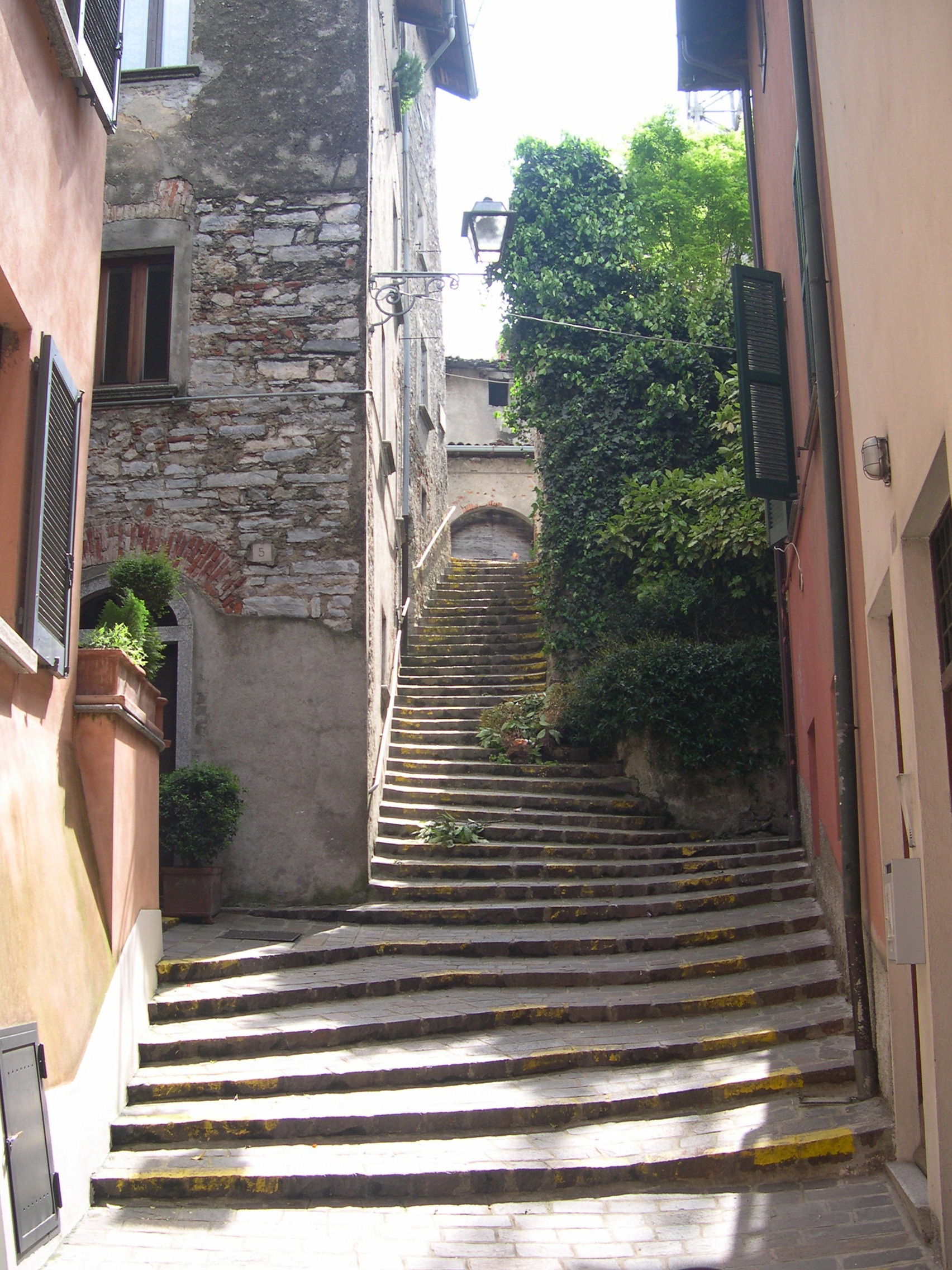

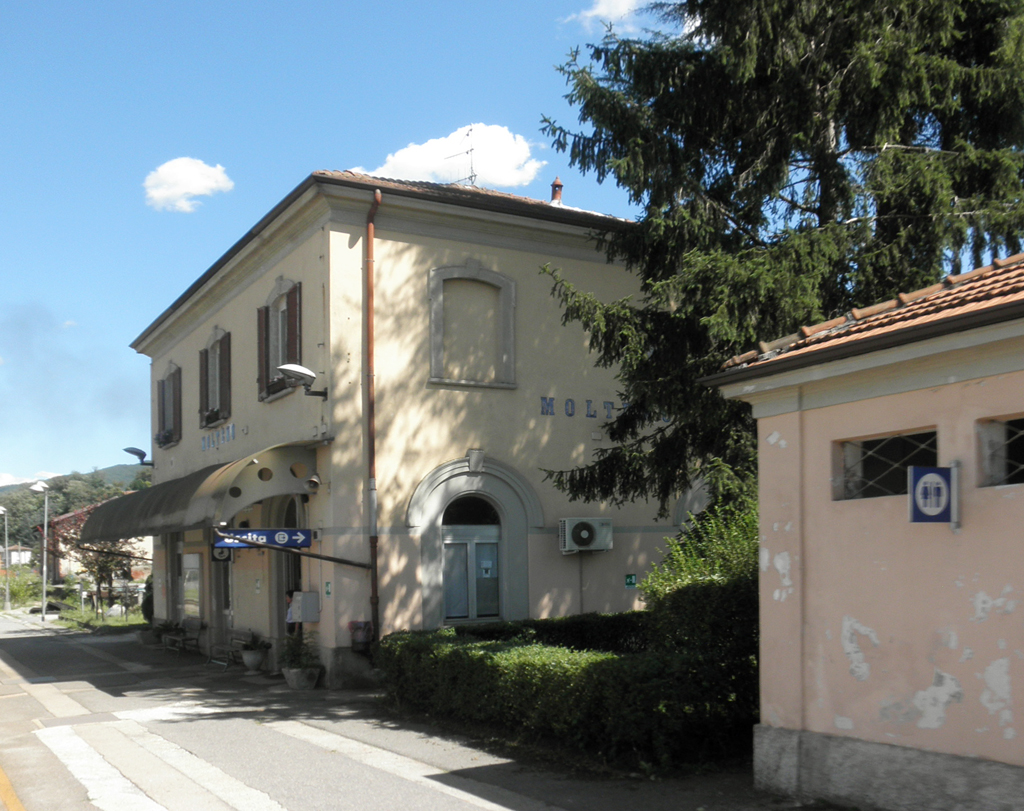
The Molteno train station
