= Bosisio =

Bosisio is an Italian surname. Notable people with the surname include:

- Franco Bosisio (born 1960), known as Franko B, Italian performance artist
- Gabriele Bosisio (born 1980), Italian cyclist
- Liù Bosisio (born 1936), Italian actress and playwright
- Lorenzo Bosisio (born 1944), Italian cyclist
- Marco Bosisio (born 2002), Italian footballer
- Renato Giuseppe Bosisio (1930–2019), Canadian engineer and academic.

== See also ==
- Bosisio Parini, comune in Lombardy, Italy
- Brazilian frigate Bosísio (F48)
