= Pusiano =

Pusiano Püsian (Lombard)
- Comune
- Comune di Pusiano
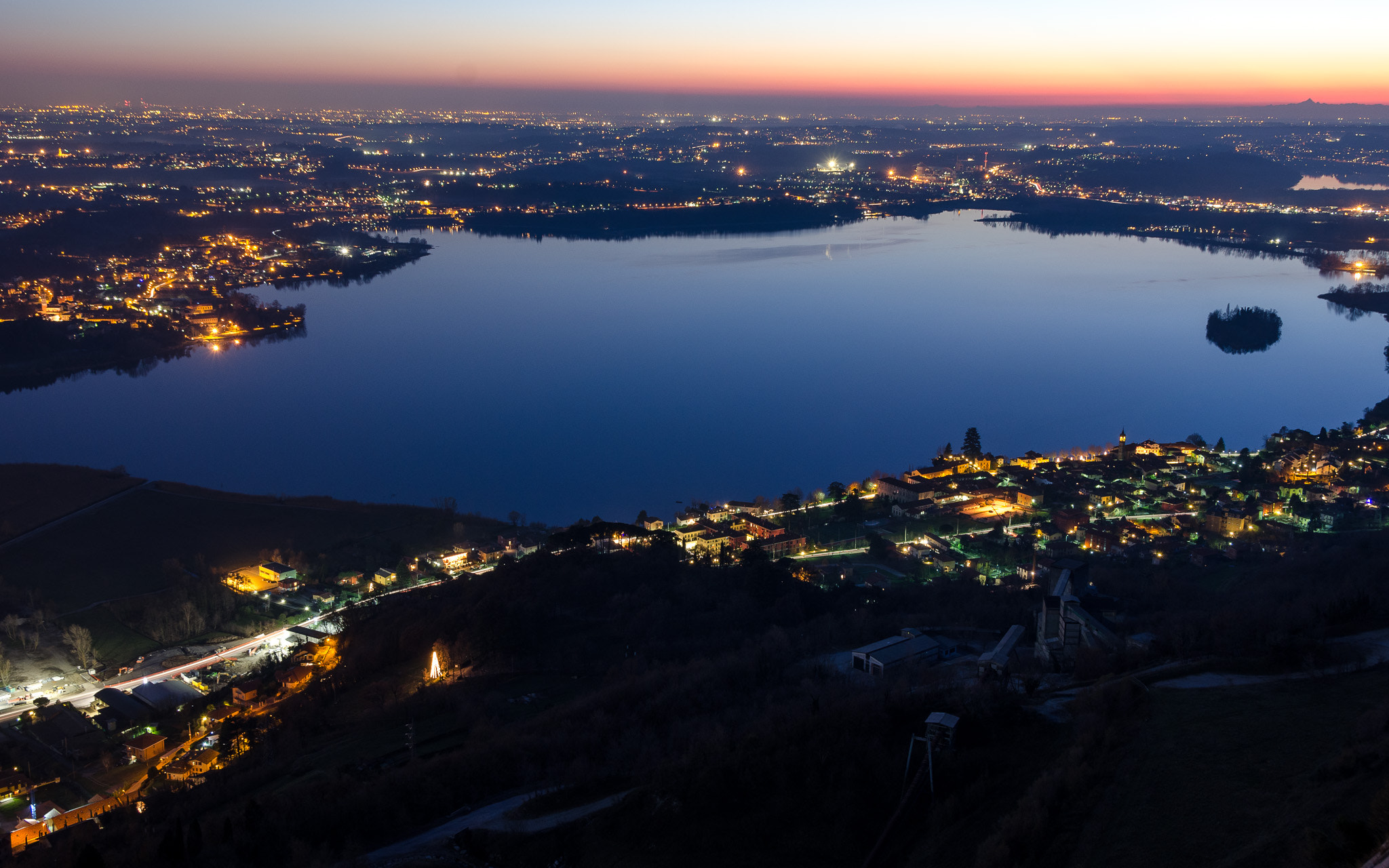
- Panorama of the Lake of Pusiano

- Location within Italy Location within Lombardy
- Coordinates: 45°49′N 9°17′E
- Country: Italy
- Region: Lombardy
- Province: Province of Como (CO)

Area
  - Total: 3.2 km^{2} (1.2 sq mi)

Population (Dec. 2004)
  - Total: 1,225
  - Density: 380/km^{2} (990/sq mi)
- Time zone: UTC+1 (CET)
  - Summer (DST): UTC+2 (CEST)
- Postal code: 22030
- Dialing code: 031

Pusiano (Brianzöö: Püsian [pyˈzjãː]) is a comune (municipality) in the Province of Como, in the Italian region Lombardy, located about 40 kilometres (25 mi) north of Milan, and about 15 kilometres (9 mi) east of Como. As of 31 December 2004, it had a population of 1,225, and an area of 3.2 square kilometres (1.2 mi^{2}).

Pusiano borders the following municipalities: Canzo, Cesana Brianza, Eupilio.

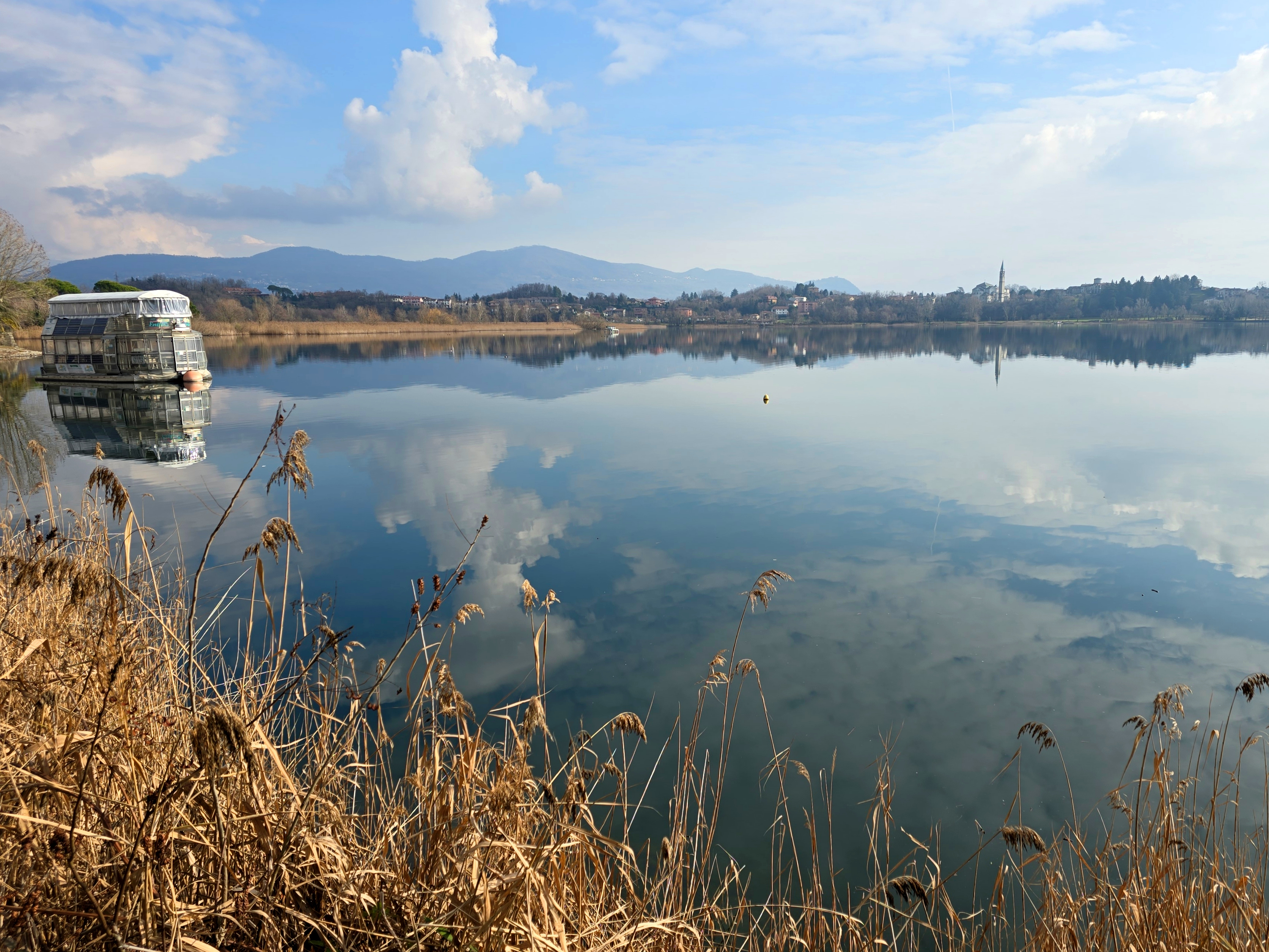
Pusiano: Lake Pusiano

== Demographic evolution ==
Historical population

Year	Pop.	±%
1861	685	—
1871	657	−4.1%
1881	703	+7.0%
1901	787	+11.9%
1911	819	+4.1%

Year	Pop.	±%
1921	726	−11.4%
1931	721	−0.7%
1936	721	+0.0%
1951	820	+13.7%
1961	847	+3.3%

Year	Pop.	±%
1971	927	+9.4%
1981	1,060	+14.3%
1991	1,158	+9.2%
2001	1,166	+0.7%

Source: Data from ISTAT

== 19th-century Pusiano millennial cult ==
In the 19th century, Pusiano became known for a small millennial cult founded by Angela Isacchi (1827-1895) and her sister Teresa (1833-1890). The “prophetesses of Pusiano” proclaimed in the 1850s that the messages they were allegedly receiving from God (the “Holy Word”) were the third testament of the divine revelation, and that the Papal States and the Austrian Empire would both disappear if they would not officially recognize the new revelation. The Isacchi sisters were supported by some local priests in Pusiano, while cardinal Andrea Carlo Ferrari in Milan and the Vatican regarded them as just mentally disturbed. The last remnants of the cult disappeared in the 1930s.

== Twin towns ==
Pusiano is twinned with:

- Magyarszék, Hungary
