= Civate =

Civate Ciüâ (Lombard)
- Comune
- Comune di Civate
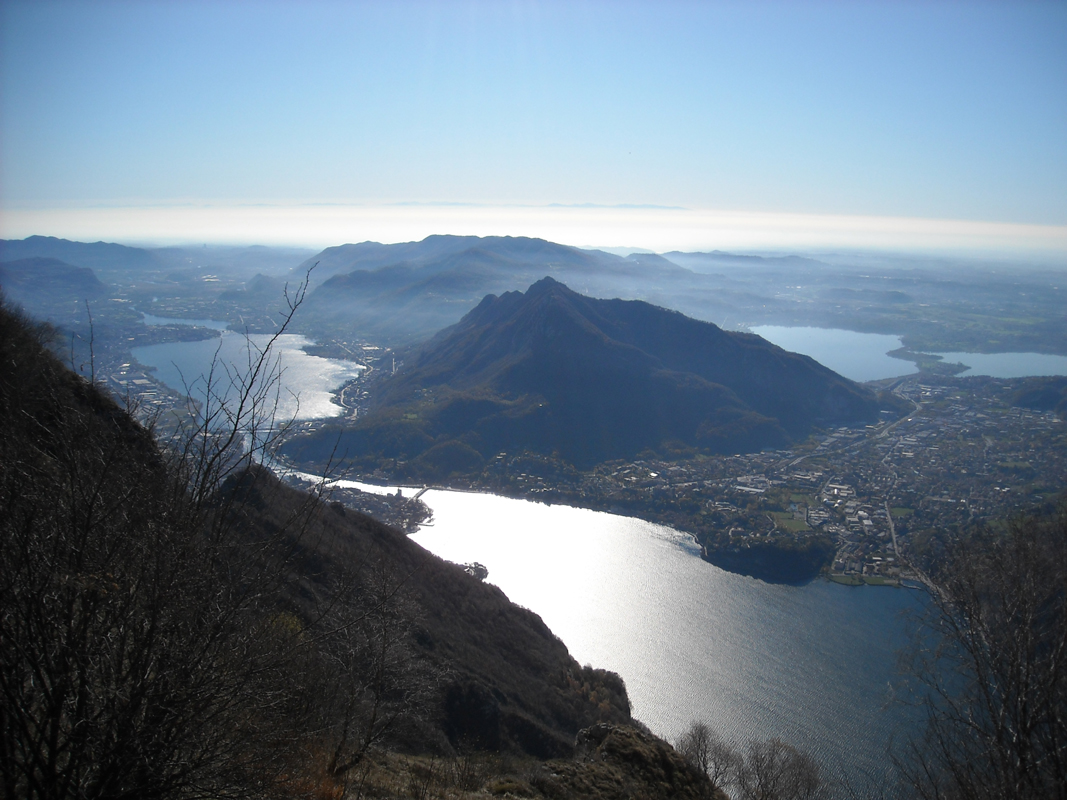

- Location within Italy Location within Lombardy
- Coordinates: 45°50′N 9°21′E
- Country: Italy
- Region: Lombardy
- Province: Province of Lecco (LC)

Area
  - Total: 9.1 km^{2} (3.5 sq mi)
- Elevation: 269 m (883 ft)

Population (January 2014)
  - Total: 4 008
  - Density: 0.44/km^{2} (1.1/sq mi)
- Demonym: Civatesi
- Time zone: UTC+1 (CET)
  - Summer (DST): UTC+2 (CEST)
- Postal code: 23862
- Dialing code: 0341
- Website: Official website

Civate (Lecchese: Ciüâ) is a comune (municipality) in the Province of Lecco in the Italian region Lombardy, located about 45 kilometres (28 mi) northeast of Milan and about 4 kilometres (2 mi) southwest of Lecco. As of 31 December 2004, it had a population of 3,898 and an area of 9.1 square kilometres (3.5 mi^{2}). Lago di Annone is located on its borders.

Civate borders the following municipalities: Annone di Brianza, Canzo, Cesana Brianza, Galbiate, Suello, Valmadrera.

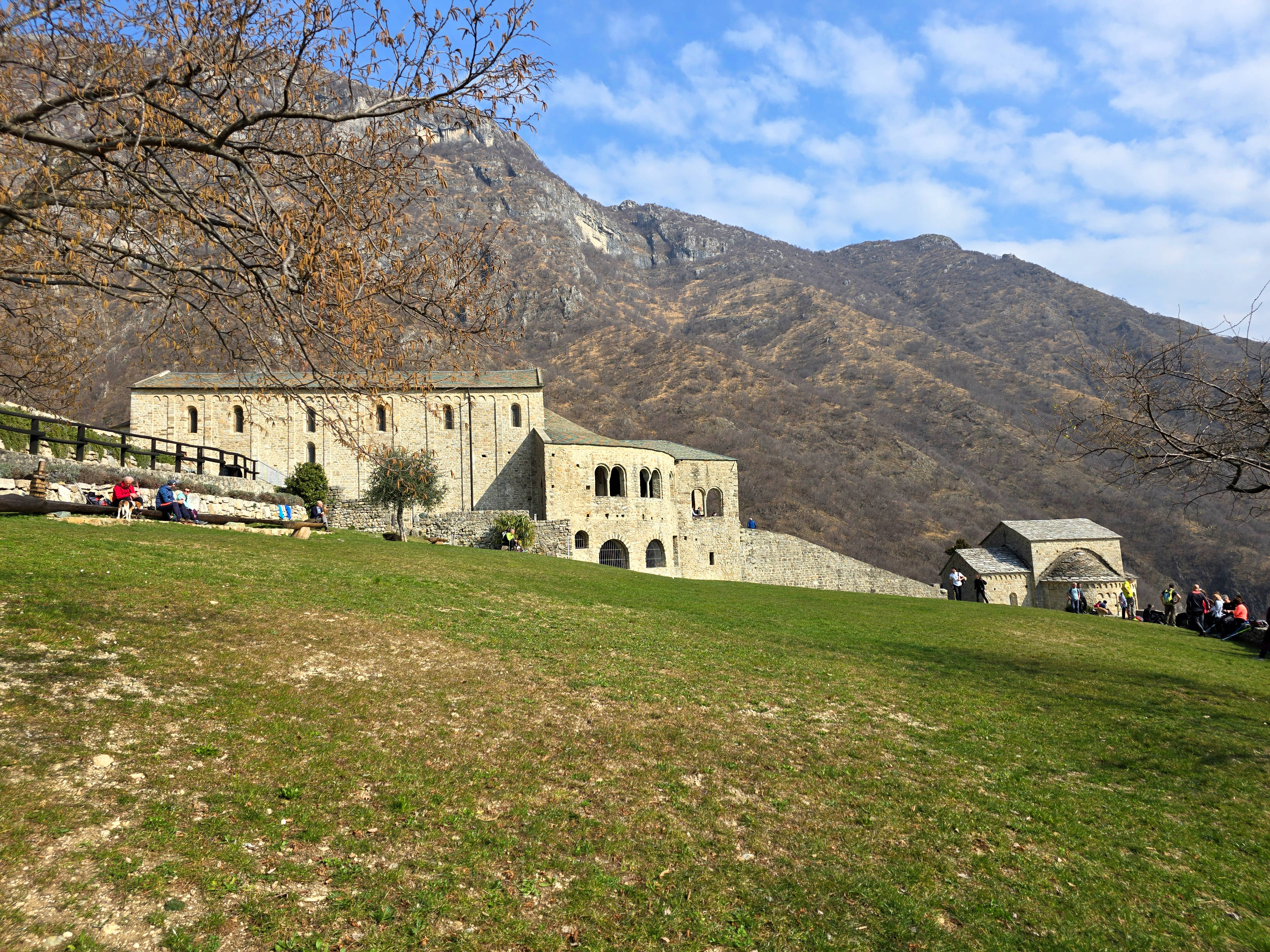
Civate: Abbey of San Pietro al Monte

== Demographic evolution ==
Historical population

Year	Pop.	±%
1861	1,513	—
1871	1,621	+7.1%
1881	1,728	+6.6%
1901	2,001	+15.8%
1911	2,229	+11.4%

Year	Pop.	±%
1921	2,215	−0.6%
1931	2,161	−2.4%
1936	2,250	+4.1%
1951	2,536	+12.7%
1961	2,633	+3.8%

Year	Pop.	±%
1971	3,152	+19.7%
1981	3,092	−1.9%
1991	3,664	+18.5%
2001	3,846	+5.0%

Source: Data from ISTAT
