= Suello =

Suello Süèl (Lombard)
- Comune
- Comune di Suello
- Location within Italy Location within Lombardy
- Coordinates: 45°49′N 9°19′E
- Country: Italy
- Region: Lombardy
- Province: Province of Lecco (LC)

Area
  - Total: 2.6 km^{2} (1.0 sq mi)

Population (Dec. 2004)
  - Total: 1,587
  - Density: 610/km^{2} (1,600/sq mi)
- Time zone: UTC+1 (CET)
  - Summer (DST): UTC+2 (CEST)
- Postal code: 23867
- Dialing code: 031

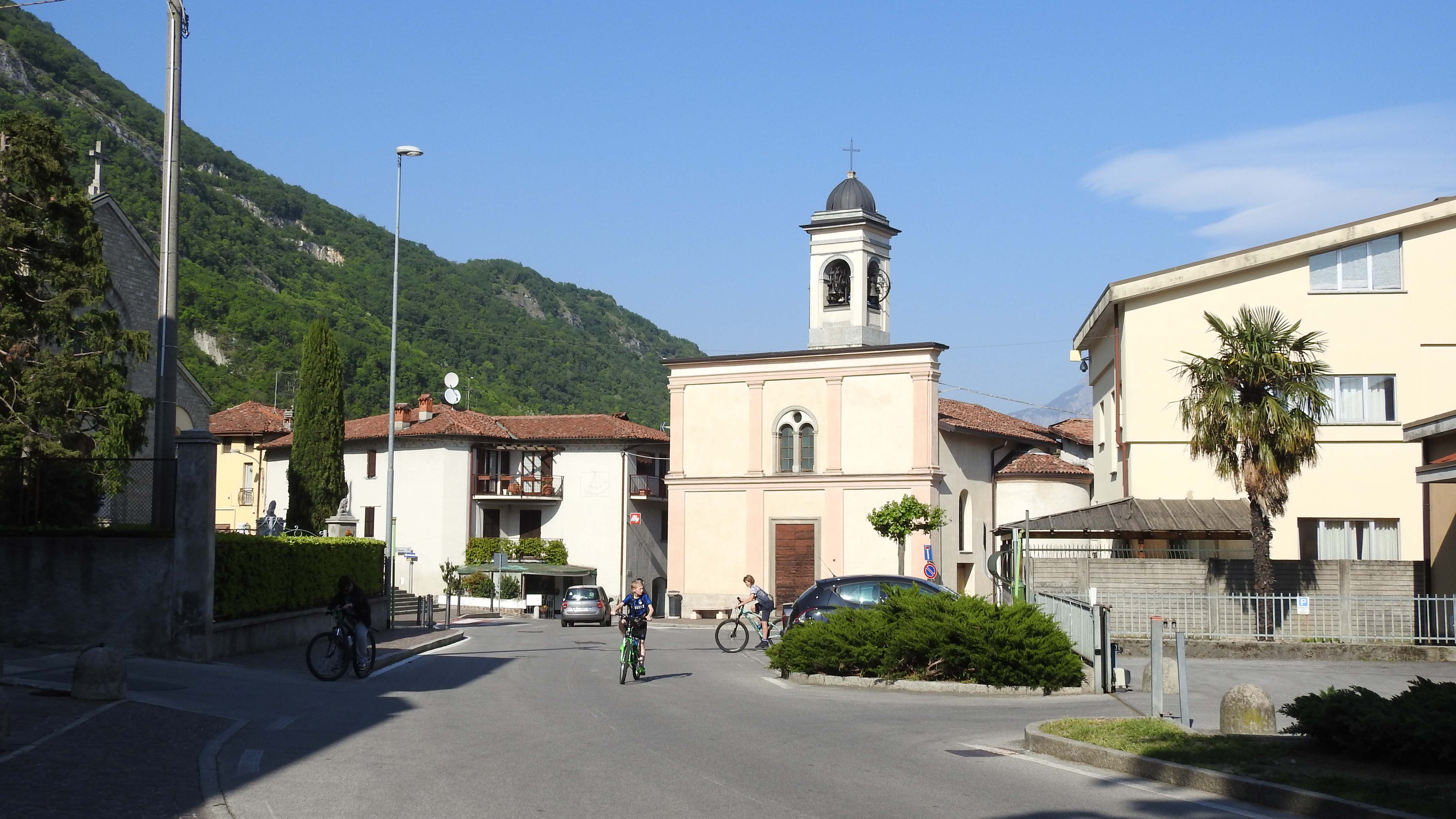
Via Roma mit San Biagio, Suello

Suello (Brianzöö: Süèl) is a comune (municipality) in the Province of Lecco in the Italian region Lombardy, located about 40 kilometres (25 mi) northeast of Milan and about 7 kilometres (4 mi) southwest of Lecco. As of 31 December 2004, it had a population of 1,587 and an area of 2.6 square kilometres (1.0 mi^{2}). Lago di Annone is located on its borders.

Suello borders the following municipalities: Annone di Brianza, Cesana Brianza, Civate.

== Demographic evolution ==
Historical population

Year	Pop.	±%
1861	659	—
1871	684	+3.8%
1881	712	+4.1%
1901	754	+5.9%
1911	811	+7.6%

Year	Pop.	±%
1921	822	+1.4%
1931	846	+2.9%
1936	819	−3.2%
1951	940	+14.8%
1961	1,045	+11.2%

Year	Pop.	±%
1971	1,261	+20.7%
1981	1,327	+5.2%
1991	1,476	+11.2%
2001	1,554	+5.3%

Source: Data from ISTAT
