= Garbagnate Monastero =

- Comune
- Comune di Garbagnate Monastero
- Coat of arms

- Location within Italy Location within Lombardy
- Coordinates: 45°46′N 9°18′E
- Country: Italy
- Region: Lombardy
- Province: Lecco (LC)
- Frazioni: Brongio alto, Brongio basso, Tregiorgio, Ruscolo, Fornacette

Government
  - Mayor: Mauro Colombo

Area
  - Total: 3.5 km^{2} (1.4 sq mi)
- Elevation: 300 m (980 ft)

Population (31 August 2017)
  - Total: 2,475
  - Density: 710/km^{2} (1,800/sq mi)
- Demonym: Garbagnatesi
- Time zone: UTC+1 (CET)
  - Summer (DST): UTC+2 (CEST)
- Postal code: 23846
- Dialing code: 031
- Website: Official website

Garbagnate Monastero (Brianzöö: Garbagnaa) is a comune (municipality) in the Province of Lecco in the Italian region Lombardy, located about 35 kilometres (22 mi) northeast of Milan and about 12 kilometres (7 mi) southwest of Lecco. Garbagnate Monastero borders the following municipalities: Barzago, Bulciago, Costa Masnaga, Molteno, Sirone.

In 1992 the municipality of Garbagnate Monastero passed from the province of Como in the province of Lecco. The ISTAT code of the town before the change was 013104. Since 1997, the new zip code of the town is 23846. The old zip code was 22040. Economic activities include packaging, machinery and engineering.
