= Sfondrati =

Sfondrati is an Italian surname. Notable people with the surname include:

- Francesco Sfondrati (1493–1550), Italian Roman Catholic bishop and cardinal and the father of Pope Gregory XIV
- Niccolo Sfondrati (11 February 1535 – 16 October 1591), Pope known as Pope Gregory XIV
- Paolo Emilio Sfondrati (1560 – 14 February 1618), Italian Cardinal
- Celestino Sfondrati (10 January 1644 – 4 September 1696), Italian Benedictine theologian, Prince-abbot of St. Gall and Cardinal
