= Lake Annone =

Lake in Lombardy, Italy

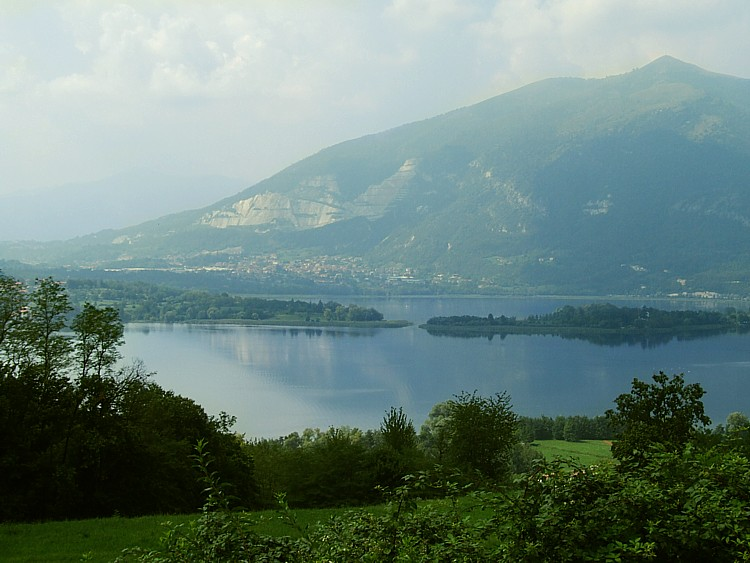

- Location within Lombardy
- Location: Province of Lecco, Lombardy
- Coordinates: 45°48′43″N 9°20′58″E
- Primary outflows: Rio Torto
- Catchment area: 28.1 km^{2} (10.8 sq mi)
- Basin countries: Italy
- Surface area: 5.71 km^{2} (2.20 sq mi)
- Max. depth: 11.3 m (37 ft)
- Surface elevation: 224 m (735 ft)

Lake Annone (Italian: Lago di Annone), also called Lake Oggiono (Italian: Lago di Oggiono), is a lake in the Province of Lecco, Lombardy, Italy. It borders the municipalities of Annone di Brianza, Suello, Civate, Galbiate and Oggiono. It covers 5.7 square kilometres.

== Description ==
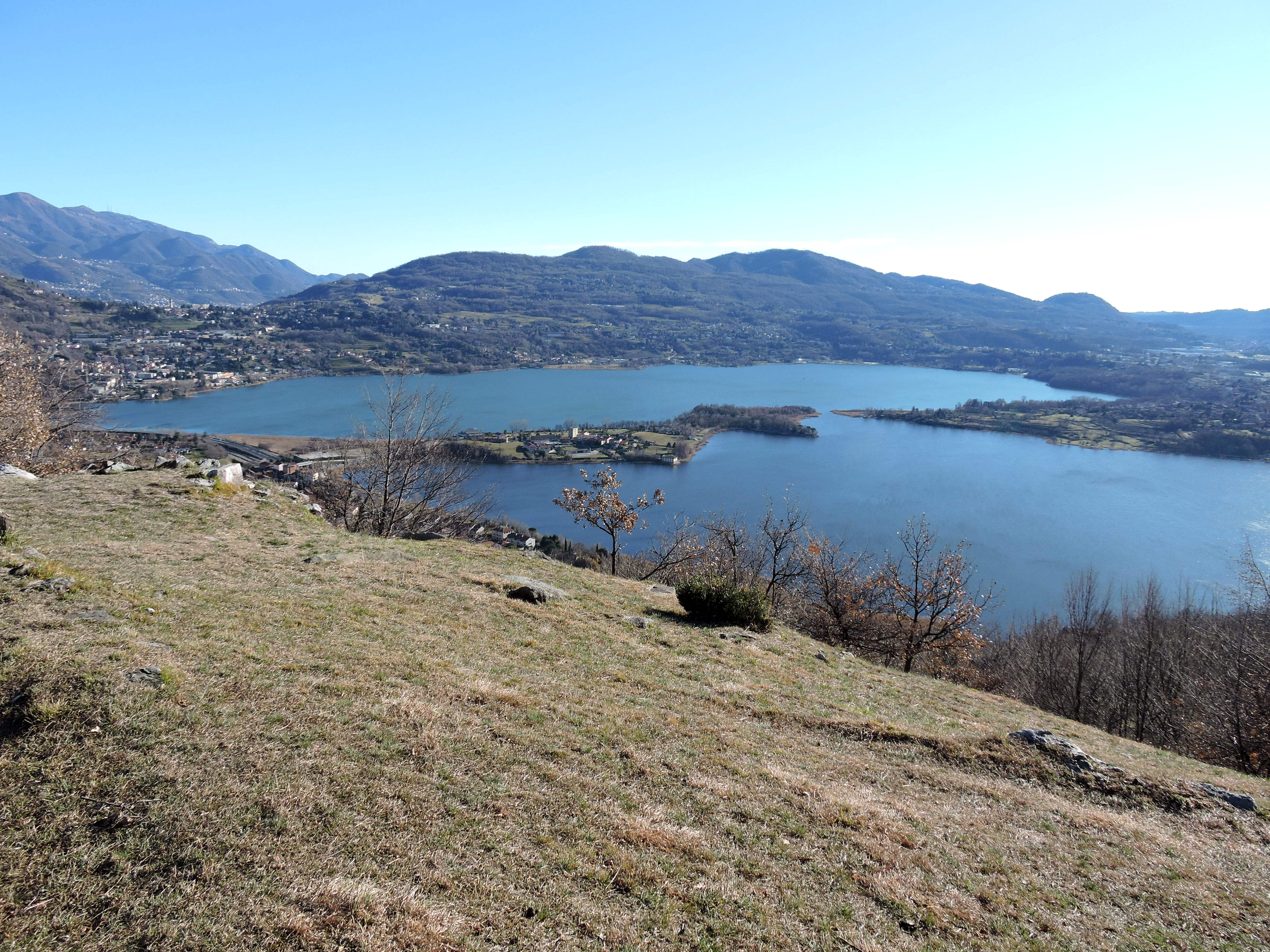
Civate: Lake Annone, from the path to the Abbey of San Pietro al Monte

The two peninsulas of Isella and Annone divide the lake into two parts (basins), connected by a narrow channel just a few meters wide. On the lake of Annone there are the municipalities of Annone di Brianza, Suello, Civate, Galbiate and Oggiono. The East Basin tributaries are the following streams:

- Cologna;
- Bondì;
- Rossa;
- Laghetto;
- Bomboldo;
- Bosisolo;
- Sabina;

The West Basin tributaries are the following streams:

- Torrente Pescone;
- Torrente Calchirola;
- Fontana Pramaggiore;
- Fontana di Borima

The lake has as only emissary the Rio Torto, which tributes to the Adda.
