= Lambro =

River in northern Italy

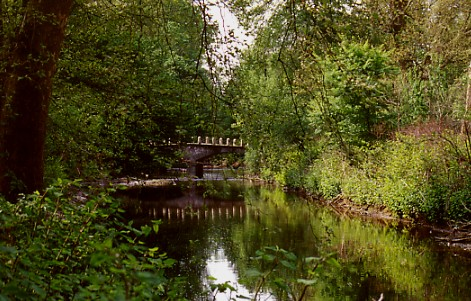
- The river in the Park of Monza

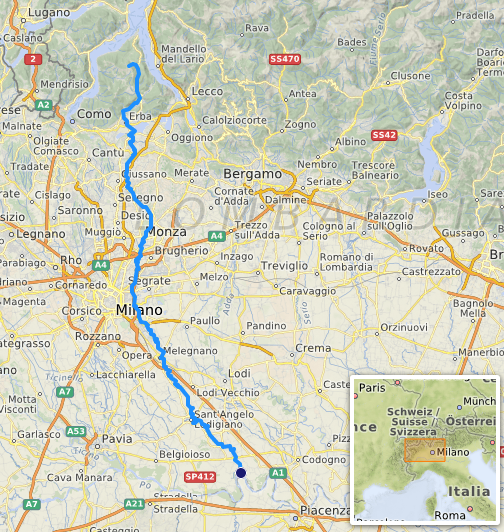

Location
- Country: Italy

Physical characteristics
- Source
  - location: Alps, Italy
  - elevation: 1,685 m (5,528 ft)
- Mouth: Po
  - coordinates: 45.1376°N 9.5450°E
- Length: 130 km (81 mi)
- Basin size: 1,950 km^{2} (750 mi^{2})
- Discharge
  - average: 5.8 m^{3}/s (200 cu ft/s)

Basin features
- Progression: Po→ Adriatic Sea

The Lambro (Lombard: Lamber or Lambar [ˈlãːber; -bar]) is a river of Lombardy, northern Italy, a left tributary of the Po.

The Lambro rises from the Monte San Primo, elevation 1,685 metres (5,528 ft), near the Ghisallo, in the province of Como, not far from Lake Como. After Magreglio it flows through the Valassina and the comuni of Asso, Ponte Lambro and Erba, entering Lake Pusiano with the name of Lambrone. The Lambro passes through Brianza reaching Monza and crossing its famous park (where king Umberto I was assassinated by Gaetano Bresci) in two branches which join again before the river passes through the eastern part of Milan. At Melegnano it receives the waters of the Vettabbia and, at Sant'Angelo Lodigiano, those of its main tributary, the Lambro meridionale ("Southern Lambro"), almost doubling its discharge. The Lambro flows into the Po near Orio Litta.

At 5.8 cubic metres per second (200 cu ft/s) the average discharge of the Lambro is relatively small, but it can be occasionally boosted to 40 m^{3}/s or more by the Milanese water drains and dangerous floods are frequent in the rainy seasons.

The name Lambro was used for a popular three-wheeler commercial transport vehicle produced by Milanese automaker Innocenti, which also made the Lambretta motor scooters.

== Etymology ==
According to Pokorny's Indogermanisches etymologisches Wörterbuch (Indo-European Etymological Dictionary), 1132 (legʷh-), Lambrus corresponds to Greek ἐλαφρός, meaning 'light (in weight), quick, nimble' ('leicht, flink' in German) and is related to Illyrian lembus (*lengʷho-s) 'light vehicle' ('leichtes Fahrzeug' in German), whence also Greek λέμβος. Pokorny cites Krahe, Gymnasium 59 (1952), p. 79.

== Pollution ==
Lambro drains a very densely populated and heavily industrialized zone, including a significant portion of the Milan metropolitan area with a population of more than 3,000,000. Before the construction of a treatment plant in 2002, almost all of the sewage from the city of Milan flowed untreated into the river, as well as industrial sewage.

=== Saboteur oil spill ===
Despite the implementation of sewage treatment, overall water quality remained poor, until the major disaster of 23 February 2010, when unknown criminals poured into the river, near Villasanta, the contents of several silos containing oil and other hydrocarbons, all belonging to a company named "Lombardia Petroli". This oily mass, estimated at over 2.5 million litres (660,000 US gal), followed the entire length of the river, despite both local authorities and civil defence's efforts in order to stop the flow, then reached Po river. This disaster caused considerable damage to wildlife and vegetation, both in Lambro and in Po, and its effects will be evident for many years afterwards, making it one of the worst environmental crises in recent history in Italy.
