= Eupilio =

Eupilio Eüpili (Lombard)
- Comune
- Comune di Eupilio
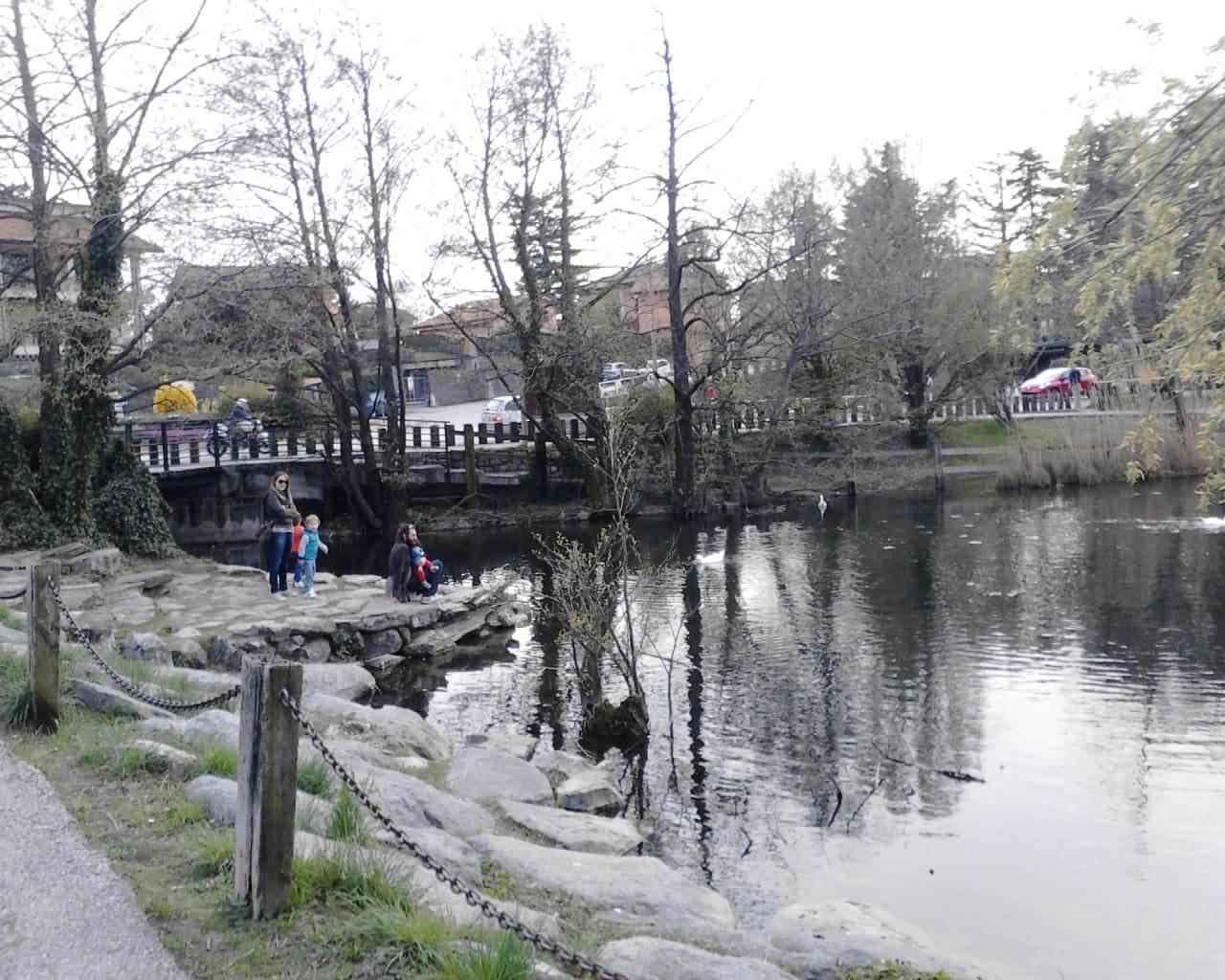
- Segrino Lake.

- Location within Italy Location within Lombardy
- Coordinates: 45°49′N 9°16′E
- Country: Italy
- Region: Lombardy
- Province: Como (CO)
- Frazioni: Carella, Corneno, Galliano, Mariaga, Penzano

Government
  - Mayor: Alessandro Spinelli

Area
  - Total: 6.5 km^{2} (2.5 sq mi)
- Elevation: 383 m (1,257 ft)

Population (31 December 2010)
  - Total: 2,779
  - Density: 430/km^{2} (1,100/sq mi)
- Demonym: Eupiliesi
- Time zone: UTC+1 (CET)
  - Summer (DST): UTC+2 (CEST)
- Postal code: 22030
- Dialing code: 031
- Website: Official website

Eupilio (Brianzöö: Eüpili [eyˈpiːli]) is a comune (municipality) in the Province of Como in the Italian region Lombardy, located about 40 kilometres (25 mi) north of Milan and about 14 kilometres (9 mi) east of Como.

Eupilio borders the following municipalities: Bosisio Parini, Canzo, Cesana Brianza, Erba, Longone al Segrino, Merone, Pusiano, Rogeno.
