= Valmadrera =

- Comune
- Città di Valmadrera
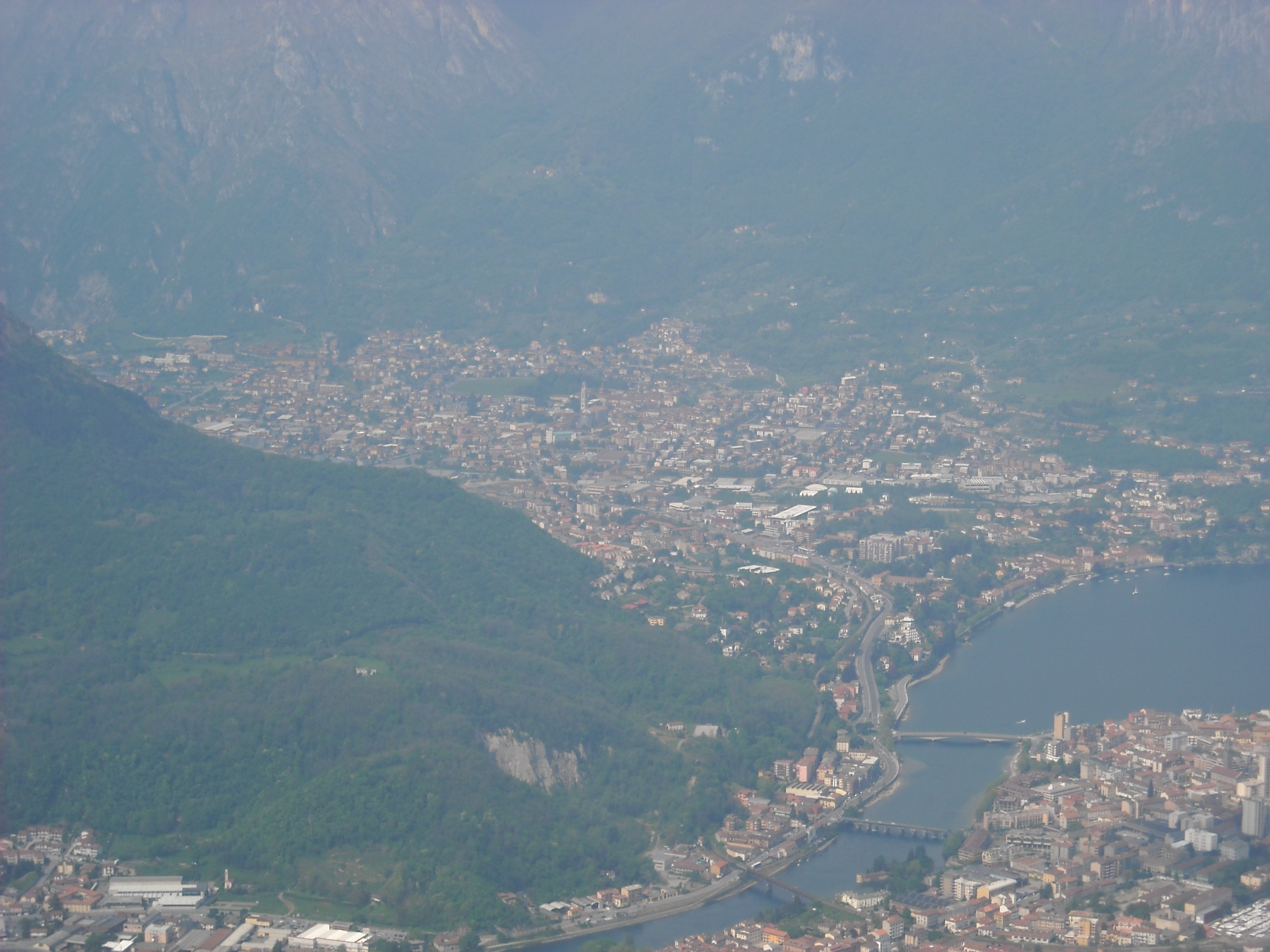
- Valmadrera

- Coat of arms

- Location within Italy Location within Lombardy
- Coordinates: 45°51′N 9°22′E
- Country: Italy
- Region: Lombardy
- Province: Lecco (LC)
- Frazioni: Caserta, Belvedere, Ceppo, Parè, San Dionigi, Trebbia

Government
  - Mayor: Antonio Rusconi

Area
  - Total: 12.6 km^{2} (4.9 sq mi)
- Elevation: 237 m (778 ft)

Population (1 January 2016)
  - Total: 11,659
  - Density: 925/km^{2} (2,400/sq mi)
- Demonym: Valmadreresi
- Time zone: UTC+1 (CET)
  - Summer (DST): UTC+2 (CEST)
- Postal code: 23868
- Dialing code: 0341
- Patron saint: Saint Anthony Abbot
- Saint day: January 17
- Website: Official website

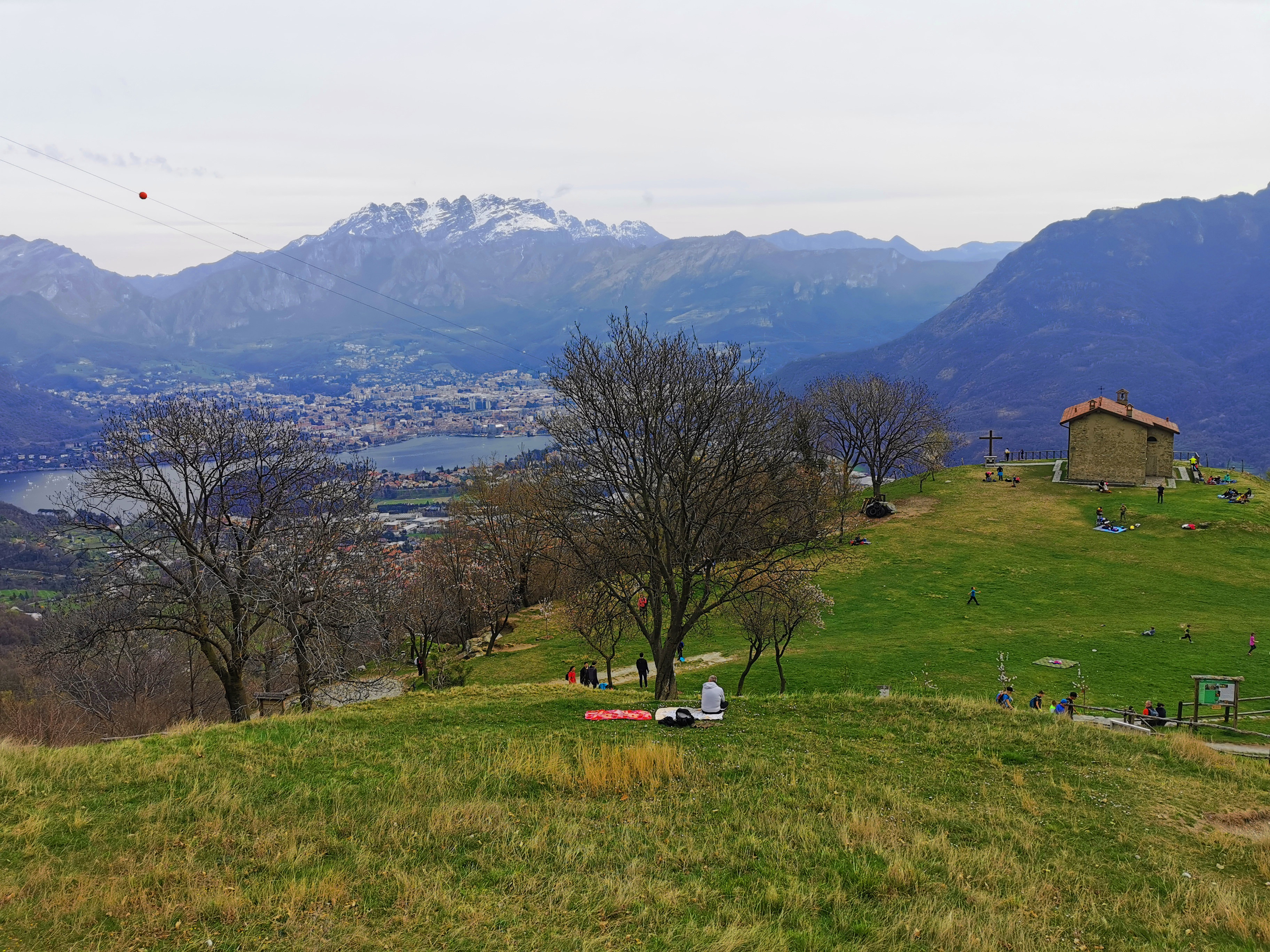
Valmadrera: plain and church of San Tomaso

Valmadrera (Lecchese: La Val) is a comune (municipality) in the Province of Lecco in the Italian region Lombardy, located about 45 kilometres (28 mi) northeast of Milan and about 3 kilometres (2 mi) west of Lecco.

Valmadrera borders the following municipalities: Canzo, Civate, Galbiate, Lecco, Malgrate, Mandello del Lario, Valbrona.

== Twin towns — sister cities ==
Valmadrera is twinned with:

- Châteauneuf-les-Martigues, France, since 2000
- Weißenhorn, Germany, since 2017
- Buckingham, England, since June 2025
