= Cornizzolo =

Mountain in Italy

Monte Cornizzolo
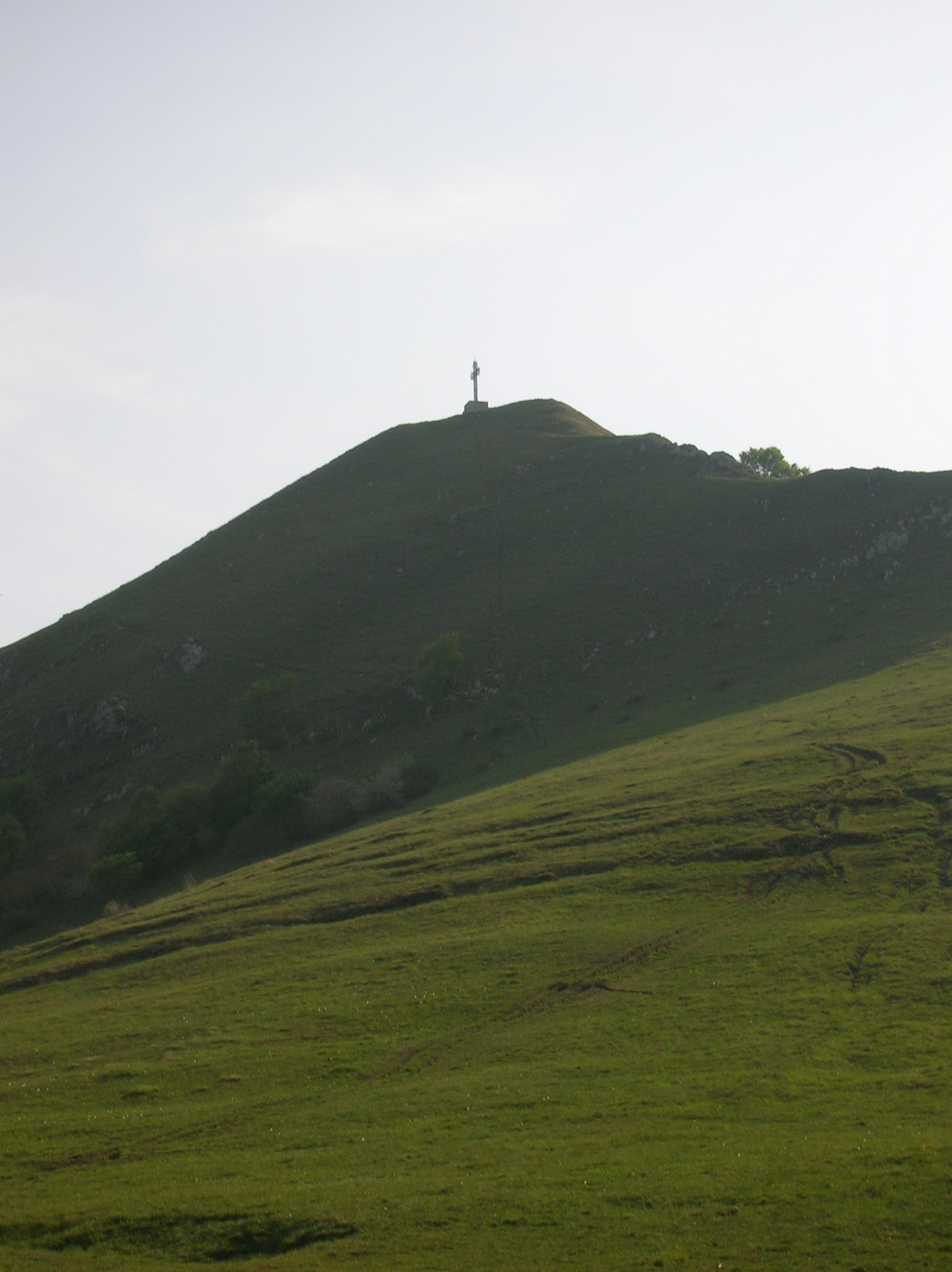

Highest point
- Elevation: 1,241 m (4,072 ft)
- Prominence: 140 m (460 ft)
- Coordinates: 45°49′12″N 09°18′02″E

Geography
- Location: Lombardy, Italy
- Parent range: Italian Alps

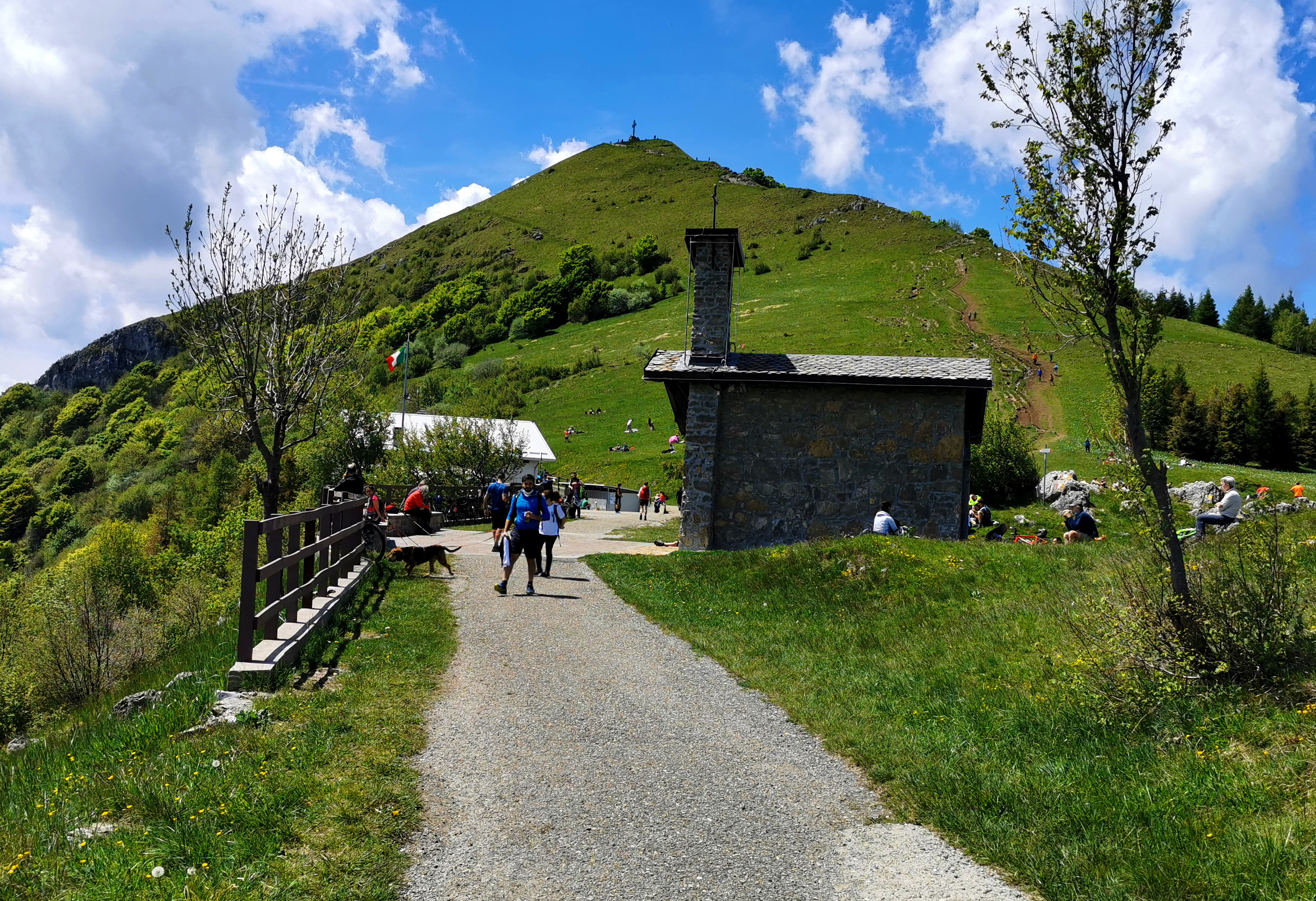
Monte Cornizzolo, seen from Rifugio Marisa Consigliere

Monte Cornizzolo (Insubric Curnisciöö) is a mountain situated between the province of Como and the province of Lecco, Lombardy, northern Italy, particularly in the territory of the village of Canzo.

The peak reaches 1,241 metres in altitude. It houses the Marisa Consigliere mountain hut, open every Sunday throughout the year, at 1,100 metres above sea level. Mount Cornizzolo is well known amongst hang gliding and paragliding fans, due to a launch camp which is available almost all year.

An element of historical interest is the Abbey of San Pietro al Monte, an 11th-century building which is located in a little valley on the mountain. Cornizzolo has historically been a holy mountain, seat of Pre-Celtic (e.g. the Coppelle: cult of Water), Celtic (e.g. the Cepp da l'Angua: cult of Anguana), Roman (e.g. the Fons Sacer: cult of Mars) and Christian worships. At the foot of the mountain there are the Shrine of Saint Miro, the Chapel of Saint Michael at Lazzaretto, the Chapel of Our Lady of the Seven Sorrows, La Santa, the Church of Saint Francis, the Church of the Saints Vitus and Modest, the Monastery of Saint Calocero, the Church of Saint Nazarus, the Church of Saint Andrew at Isella, the Pilgrims' House, the Church of Saint Steven, the Chapel of Our Lady of Caravaggio, the Monastery of Barnabite Fathers, the Church of Saint Lorence, the Shrine of Our Lady of the Snow, the Church of the Holy Spirit, the Church of Saint Antony, the Church of Saint Martin, the Church of Saint Thomas, and many other religious buildings.
