= Bosisio Parini =

- Comune
- Comune di Bosisio Parini
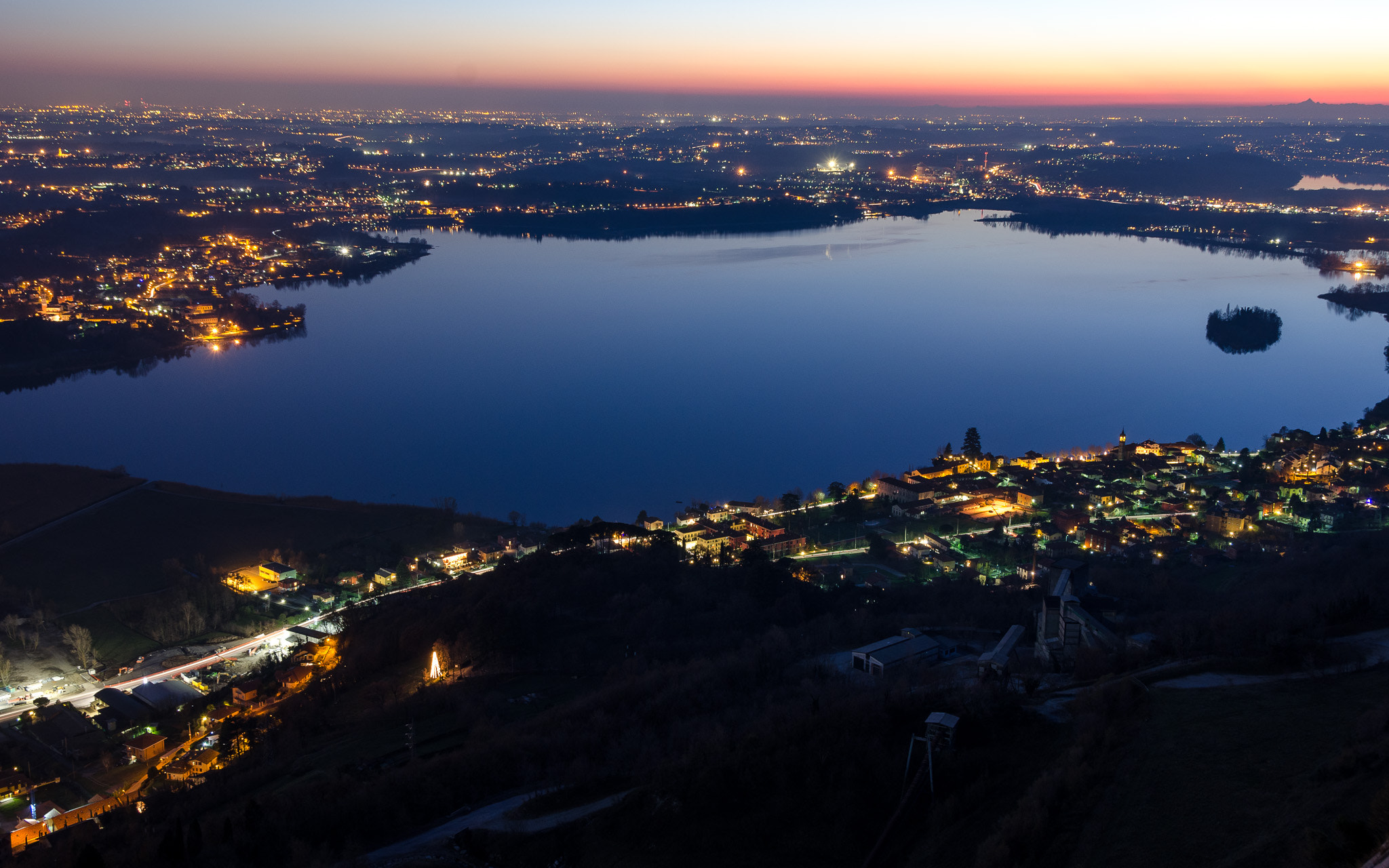
- Panorama of the Lake of Pusiano

- Coat of arms

- Location within Italy Location within Lombardy
- Coordinates: 45°48′N 9°17′E
- Country: Italy
- Region: Lombardy
- Province: Lecco (LC)
- Frazioni: Garbagnate Rota

Government
  - Mayor: Giuseppe Borgonovo

Area
  - Total: 6.6 km^{2} (2.5 sq mi)
- Elevation: 270 m (890 ft)

Population (1 January 2014)
  - Total: 3,532
  - Density: 540/km^{2} (1,400/sq mi)
- Demonym: Bosisiesi
- Time zone: UTC+1 (CET)
  - Summer (DST): UTC+2 (CEST)
- Postal code: 23842
- Dialing code: 031
- Website: Official website

Bosisio Parini (Brianzöö: Busìs) is a comune (municipality) in the Province of Lecco in the Italian region Lombardy, located about 40 kilometres (25 mi) north of Milan and about 11 kilometres (7 mi) southwest of Lecco, on the shores of the Lake of Pusiano.

Bosisio Parini borders the following municipalities: Annone di Brianza, Cesana Brianza, Eupilio, Molteno, Rogeno. The town was the birthplace of the poet Giuseppe Parini, after whom it was later named. The lakefront is titled to the sports journalist Gianni Brera, died in 1992.

== People ==
- Giuseppe Parini (1729 – 1799), poet
