= Annone di Brianza =

- Comune
- Comune di Annone di Brianza
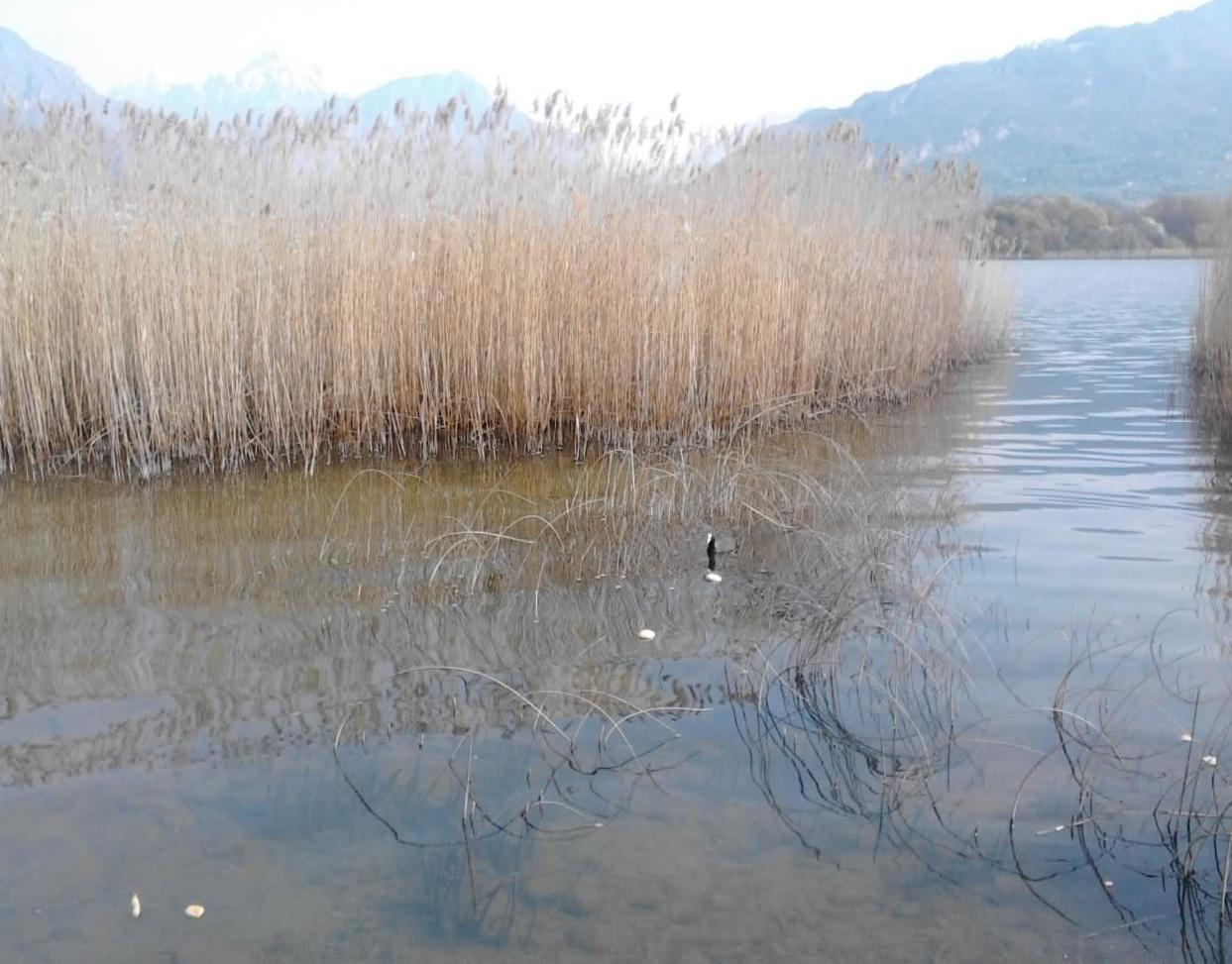
- Lake of Annone

- Coat of arms

- Location of Annone di Brianza in Italy Annone di Brianza (Lombardy)
- Coordinates: 45°47′N 9°20′E
- Country: Italy
- Region: Lombardy
- Province: Lecco (LC)

Government
  - Mayor: Patrizio Sidoti

Area
  - Total: 5.8 km^{2} (2.2 sq mi)
- Elevation: 265 m (869 ft)

Population (1 January 2014)
  - Total: 2,302
  - Density: 400/km^{2} (1,000/sq mi)
- Demonym: Annonesi
- Time zone: UTC+1 (CET)
  - Summer (DST): UTC+2 (CEST)
- Postal code: 23841
- Dialing code: 0341
- Website: Official website

Annone di Brianza (Italian pronunciation: [anˈnoːne di briˈantsa]; Lombard: Anun, Brianzöö: Anón) is a commune in the Province of Lecco, Lombardy, Italy, located about 40 kilometres (25 mi) northeast of Milan and about 9 kilometres (6 mi) southwest of Lecco. The Lago di Annone is located on its borders.

Annone di Brianza borders the following municipalities: Bosisio Parini, Cesana Brianza, Civate, Galbiate, Molteno, Oggiono, Suello.
