= Lake Alserio =

Italian lake

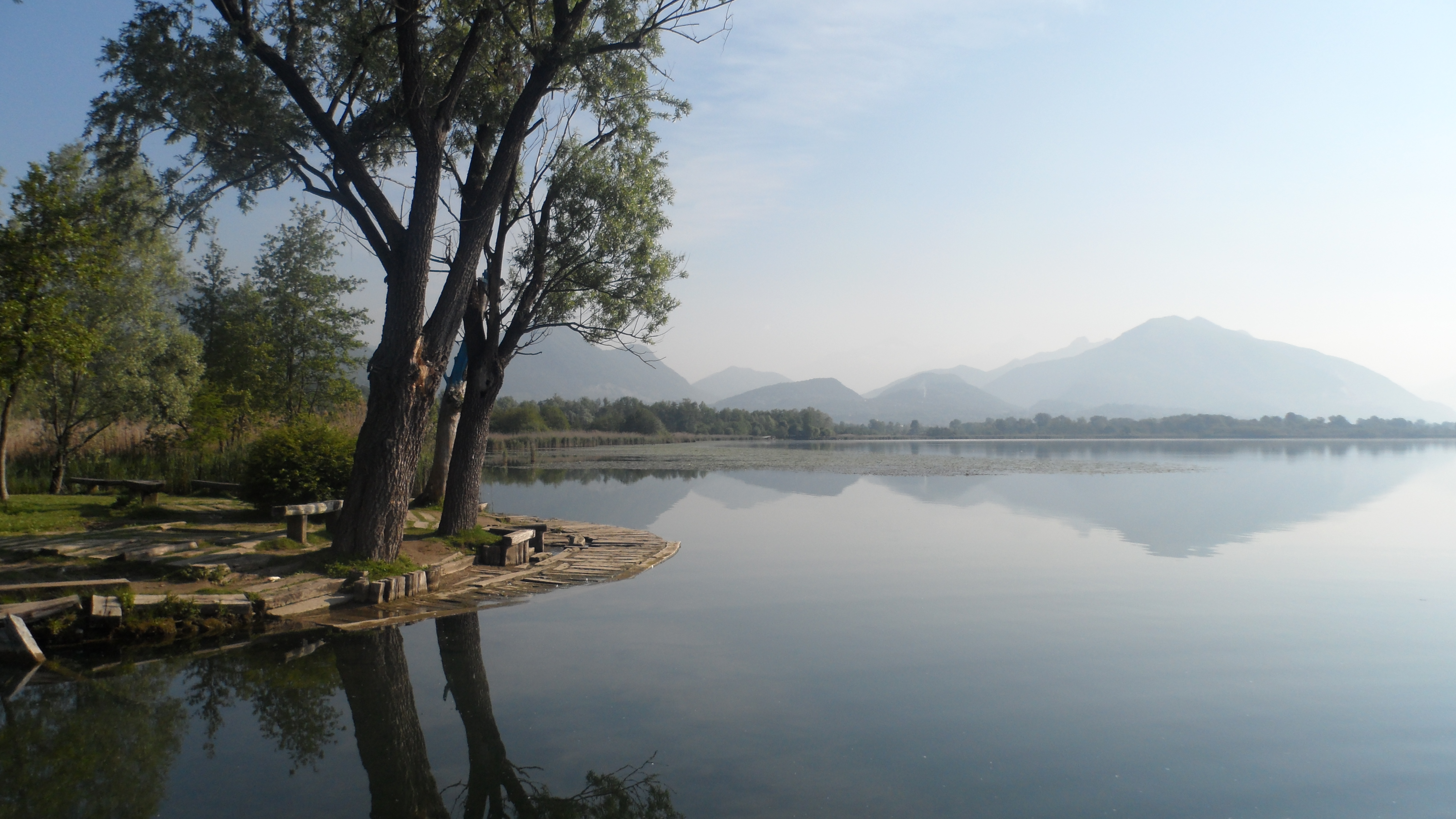

- Location within Lombardy
- Location: Province of Como, Lombardy, Italy
- Coordinates: 45°47′11″N 9°13′0″E
- Primary outflows: A tributary of the Lambro
- Catchment area: 18.3 km^{2} (7.1 sq mi)
- Basin countries: Italy
- Surface area: 1.23 km^{2} (0.47 sq mi)
- Max. depth: 8.1 m (27 ft)
- Water volume: 6,650,000 m^{3} (5,390 acre⋅ft)
- Surface elevation: 260 m (850 ft)
- Settlements: Erba, Albavilla, Alserio and Monguzzo

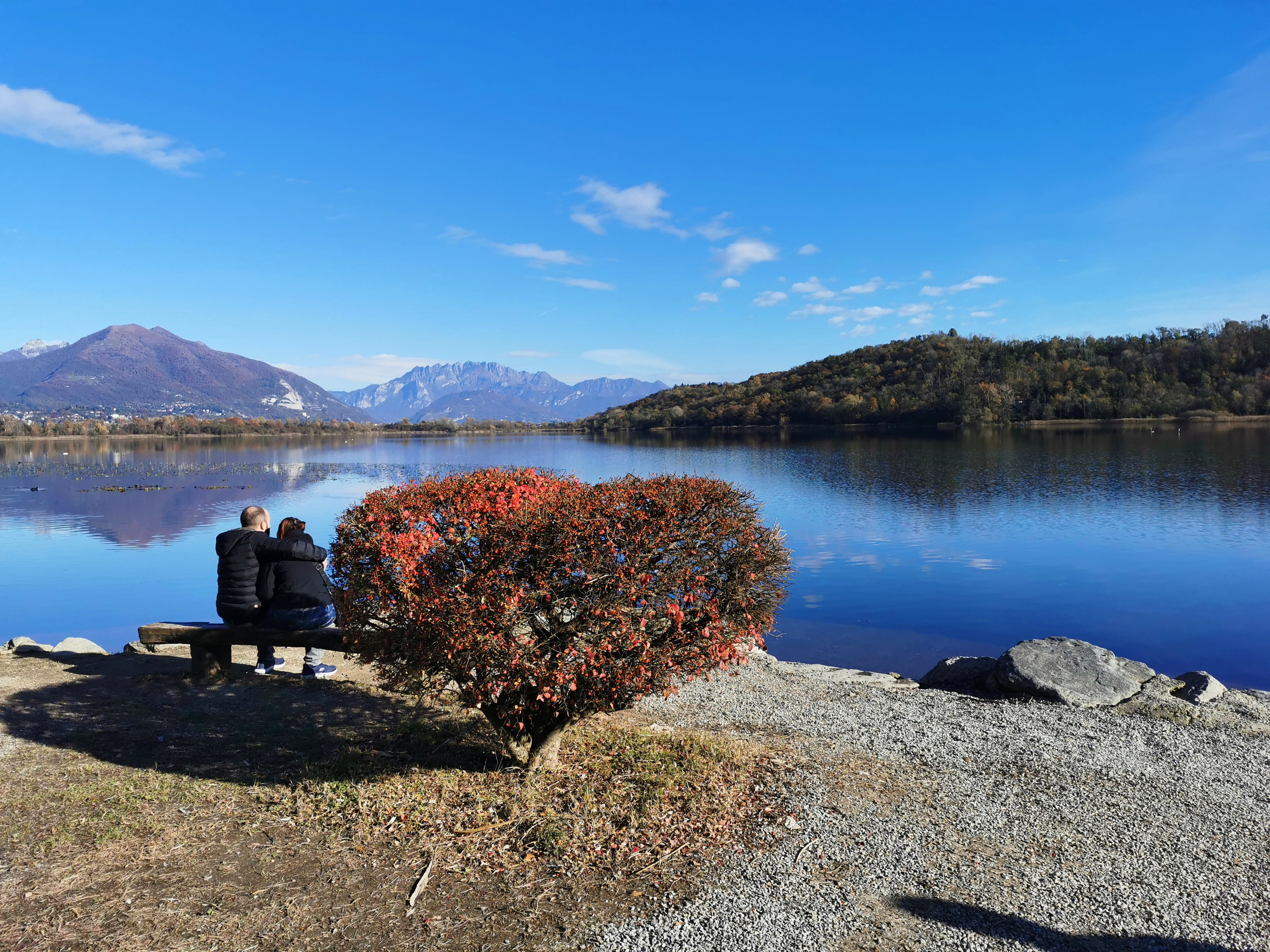
Alserio: Lake Alserio

Lake Alserio is an Italian lake located in the Province of Como, Brianza, Lombardy. On its shores lie the communes of Erba, Albavilla, Alserio and Monguzzo. The lake falls within the Parco regionale della Valle del Lambro, the regional park of the valley of the Lambro. Along its eastern shore is located a nature reserve known as the “Riva orientale del Lago di Alserio.”

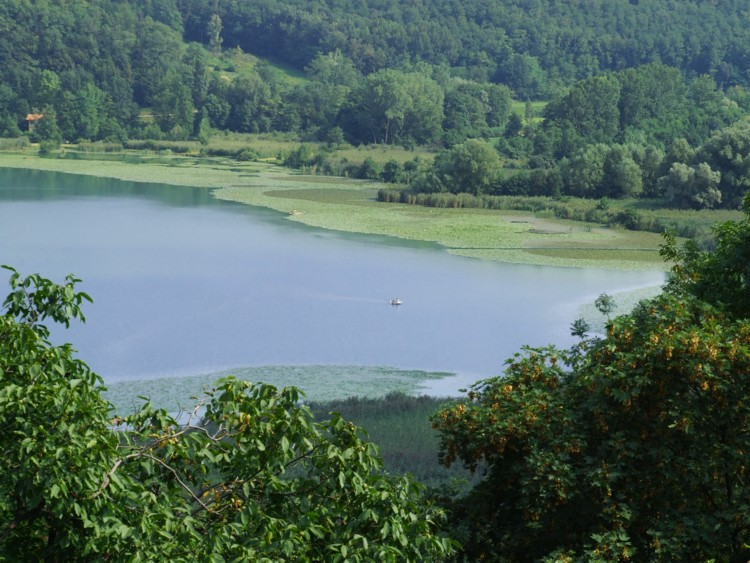
