= Prima Porta =

- Zona of Rome
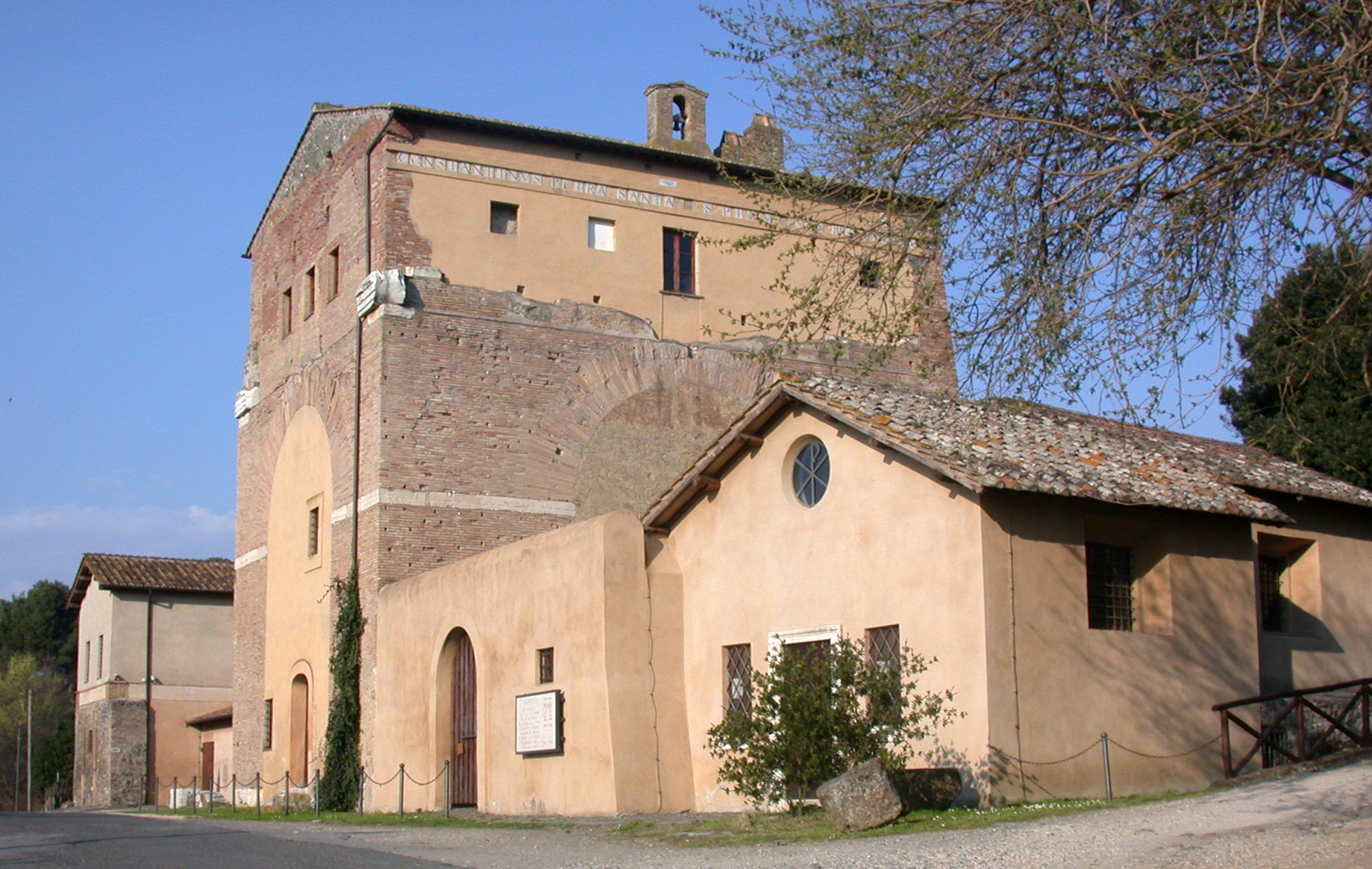
- The arch of Malborghetto and the near chapel

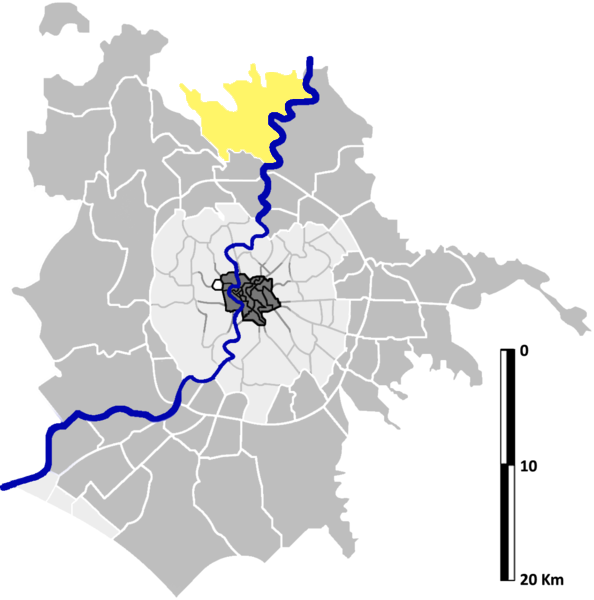
- Position of the zona within the city
- Country: Italy
- Region: Lazio
- Province: Rome
- Comune: Rome

Area
  - Total: 20.3447 sq mi (52.6926 km^{2})

Population (2016)
  - Total: 16,776
  - Density: 824.6/sq mi (318.37/km^{2})
- Time zone: UTC+1 (CET)
  - Summer (DST): UTC+2 (CEST)

Prima Porta is the 58th zona of Rome, identified by the initials Z. LVIII. The name Prima Porta (First Door) came from an arch of the aqueduct that brought water to the Villa of Livia, which formed over Via Flaminia a sort of gateway which travellers saw as the first indication of having reached Rome (Piperno).

== History ==
The location was strategically important due to the iron-rich cliffs of red tuff that approach the river at this point, the confluence of several roads, and its function as the north entryway to Rome.

Prima Porta was one of the scenes of Constantine's victory over the army of Maxentius in 312 which ended with the Battle of the Milvian Bridge. The battle is shown in the frieze of the Arch of Constantine in Rome. A triumphal arch was also erected here.

=== The Villa of Livia ===
Nearby, the villa of Livia Drusilla called Ad Gallinas Albas was probably part of Livia's dowry brought to the Julio-Claudian dynasty. It was named and famous for its breed of white chickens and for its laurel grove (Pliny's Natural History 15.136f), which were given auspiciously omened origins by Suetonius. The villa's site was rediscovered and explored as early as 1596, but it was not recognized as that of Livia until the nineteenth century.

The famous statue of Augustus from Prima Porta

In 1863–1834, a marble krater carved in refined low relief was discovered at the site and in 1867 one of the most famous marble statue of Augustus, the Augustus of Prima Porta, which is now in the Vatican (Braccio Nuovo), was discovered here. The magisterial Augustus is a marble copy of a bronze statue that celebrated the return in 20 BC of the military standards captured by the Parthians in 53 BC after the defeat of Crassus at Carrhae: a rich iconography plays out in the low reliefs that decorate his cuirass.

The villa occupied the height dominating the view down the Tiber Valley to Rome; some of the walling that retained its terraces may still be seen (Piperno). Except for works of terracing—the gardens are currently being excavated—, all that can be seen today are three vaulted subterranean rooms, from the largest of which the fine fresco decor of an illusionistic garden view, where all the plants and trees flower and fruit at once, was removed to Rome; it has recently been reinstalled in the Palazzo Massimo, following cleaning and restoration. The vault above the fresco was covered with stucco reliefs of which only a few remains survive.

The villa was built and modified in four stages, the earliest of Republican date, the latest of the time of Constantine the Great. In the nineteenth century the villa belonged to the convent of Santa Maria in Via Lata; it may never have passed into private hands.

A new series of more meticulous modern excavations was initiated in 1970.

=== Modern history ===
The new cemetery of Rome was established in Prima Porta in 1945, on a project by the architect Elena Luzzatto. With its extension of 140 hectares, the Cimitero Flaminio is the largest cemetery in Italy; it is crossed by 37 km of internal roads, on which vehicles and buses circulate. Pope Francis, having previously said Mass on All Soul's Day at Rome's Campo Verano Cemetery, said that Mass here in 2016.

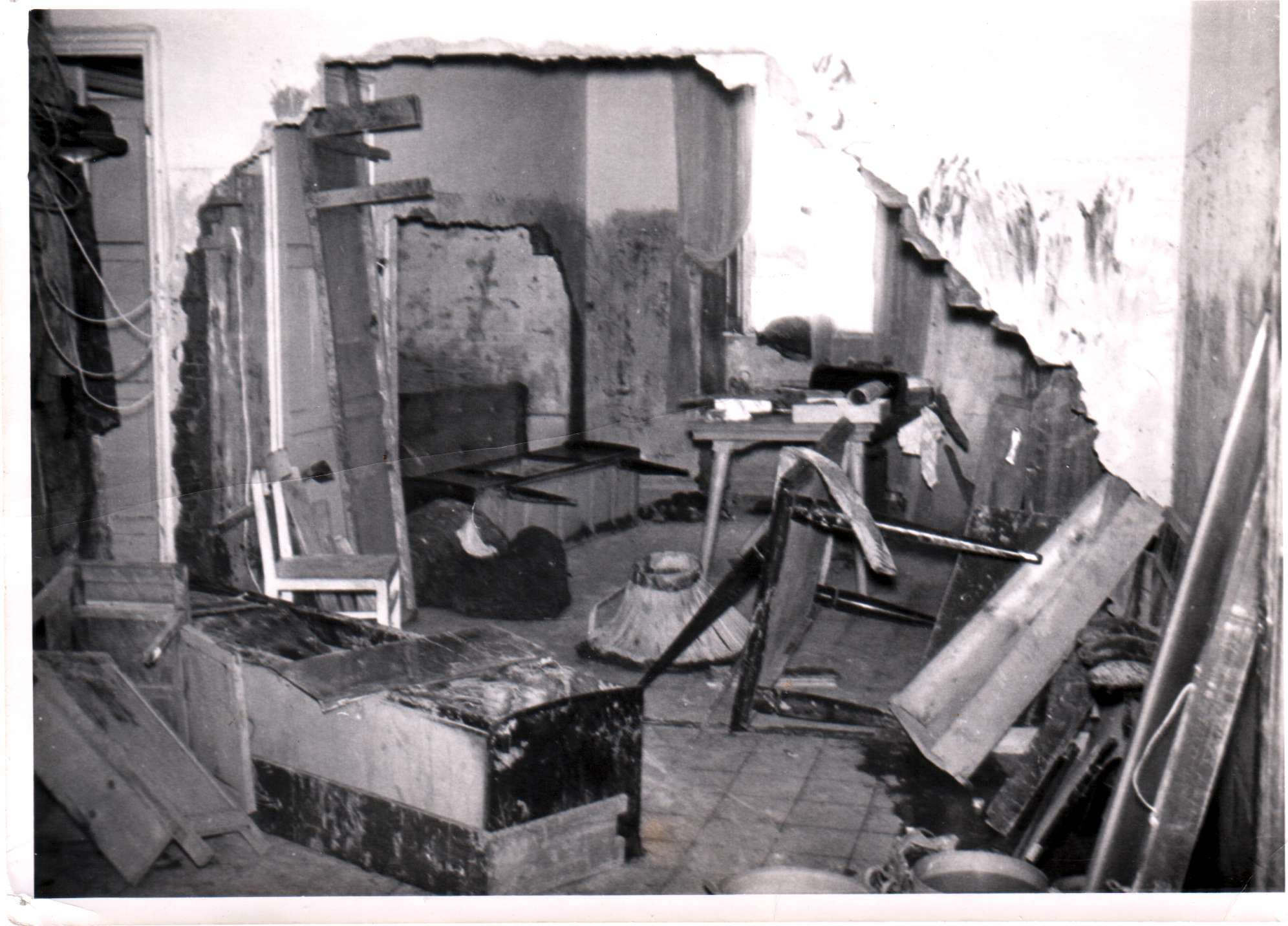
House damaged by 1965 flooding

In 1965, heavy rains made two near Tiber tributaries, which had no protective banks, to flood the area, generating infrastructural and economic damage. Water level was two meters high at some points.

== Geography ==
The zone is located 12 kilometres north of the city center, along the Via Flaminia and just a kilometre outside of the Grande Raccordo Anulare highway. It is located on the right bank of the Tiber, where the Via Tiberina leads away from the Via Flaminia and another road led off along the Cremera to Veii.

The territory of Prima Porta includes the urban zone 20L Prima Porta and part of the urban zones 20I Santa Cornelia and 20M Labaro.

=== Boundaries ===
Northward, the zone borders with the municipalities of Formello, Sacrofano and Riano.

To the east, the zone borders with Zona Marcigliana (Z. III), whose border is marked by the river Tiber, up to the Fosso di Monte Oliviero.

To the south, Prima Porta borders with Zona Labaro (Z. LVII), from which is separated by the Fosso di Monte Oliviero, then by Via della Giustiniana, up to the river Cremera.

Westward, the zone borders with Zona La Giustiniana (Z. LIV), whose boundary is outlined by the Valchetta stream, and with Zona Isola Farnese (Z. LV), from which is separated by the Fosso Pantanacci.

=== Odonymy ===
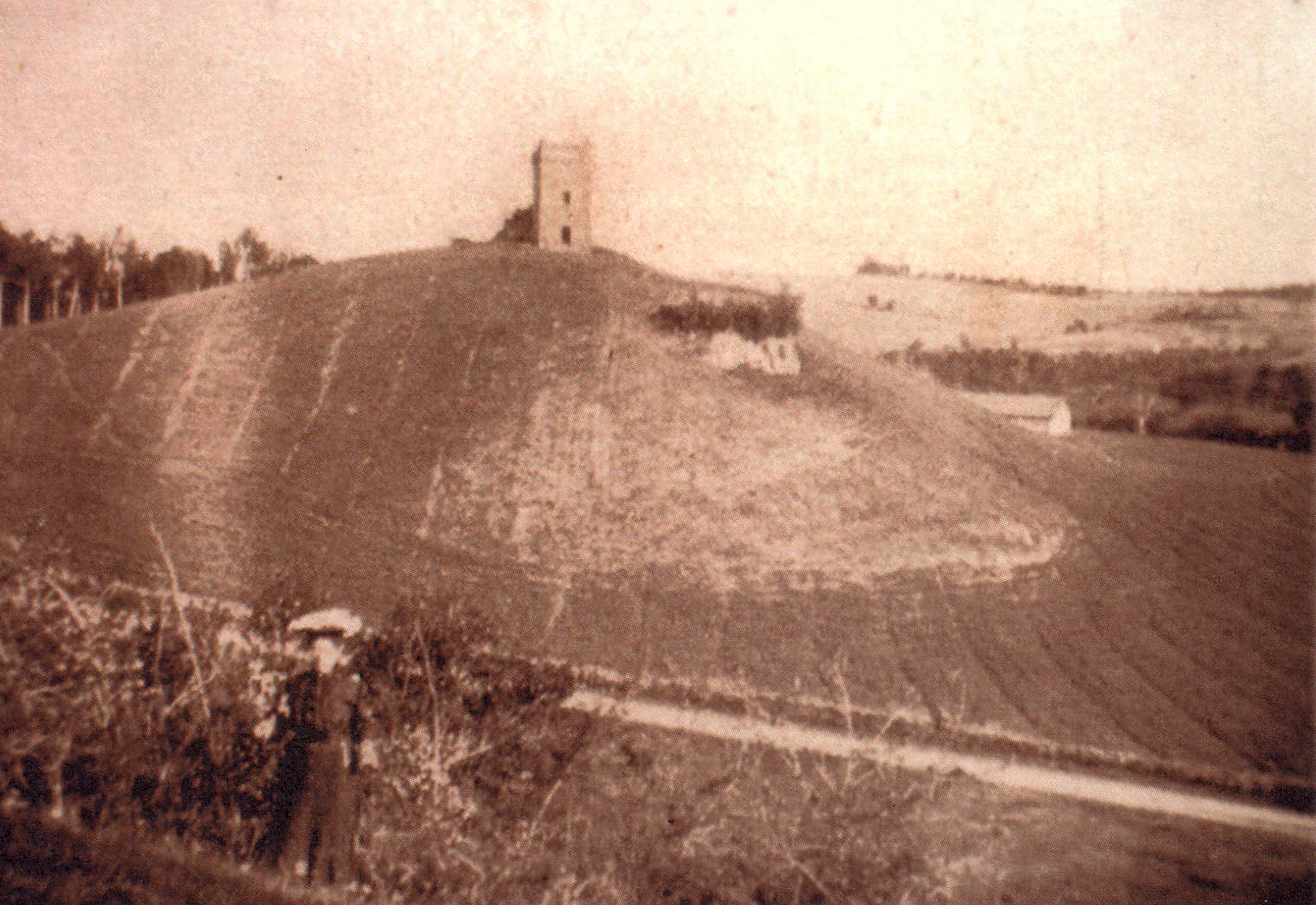
Via della Giustiniana and a medieval tower

The majority of the roads and squares of Prima Porta are named after towns of Lombardy and Latium, while some streets near the border with Zona Labaro are dedicated to Italian tapestry artists. Odonyms of the zone can be categorized as follows:

- Local toponyms, e.g. Via del Fosso di Monte Oliviero, Via della Giustiniana, Via di Grotta Oscura, Via di Malborghetto, Via Monte del Gatto, Via di Santa Cornelia, Piazza di Saxa Rubra, Via Tenuta Piccirilli, Via and Vicolo di Valle Muricana, Via della Villa di Livia;
- Tapestry artists, e.g. Via Pietro Bascotti, Via Felice Cettomai, Via Pietro Davanzo, Via Pietro Ferloni, Via Pietro Lusetti, Via Giuseppe Prinotti, Via Andrea Procaccini, Via Alessandro Zannetti;
- Towns of Latium, e.g. Via Alvito, Via Bassano in Teverina, Via Canepina, Via Casalvieri, Via Settefrati, Via Soriano nel Cimino, Via Toffia;
- Towns of Lombardy, e.g. Via Albavilla, Via Arcore, Via Bagnatica, Via Barlassina, Via Blevio, Via Bozzolo, Via Brenna, Via Cabiate, Via Casatenovo, Via Castelbelforte, Via Castenedolo, Via Concesio, Via Cornovecchio, Via Desio, Via Gardone Riviera, Via Inverigo, Via Iseo, Via Livigno, Via Lomazzo, Via Lonato, Via Luisago, Via Lumezzane, Via Mapello, Via Monte Cremasco, Via Montù Beccaria, Via Olginate, Via Orzinuovi, Via Orzivecchi, Via Pandino, Via Pianello del Lario, Via Pedrengo, Via Pegognaga, Via Pomponesco, Via Robecco sul Naviglio, Via Roncoferraro, Via Saronno, Via Sulbiate, Via Sesto Calende, Via Varenna, Via Viadana, Via Viadanica, Via Zavattarello.

== Places of interest ==
=== Civil buildings ===
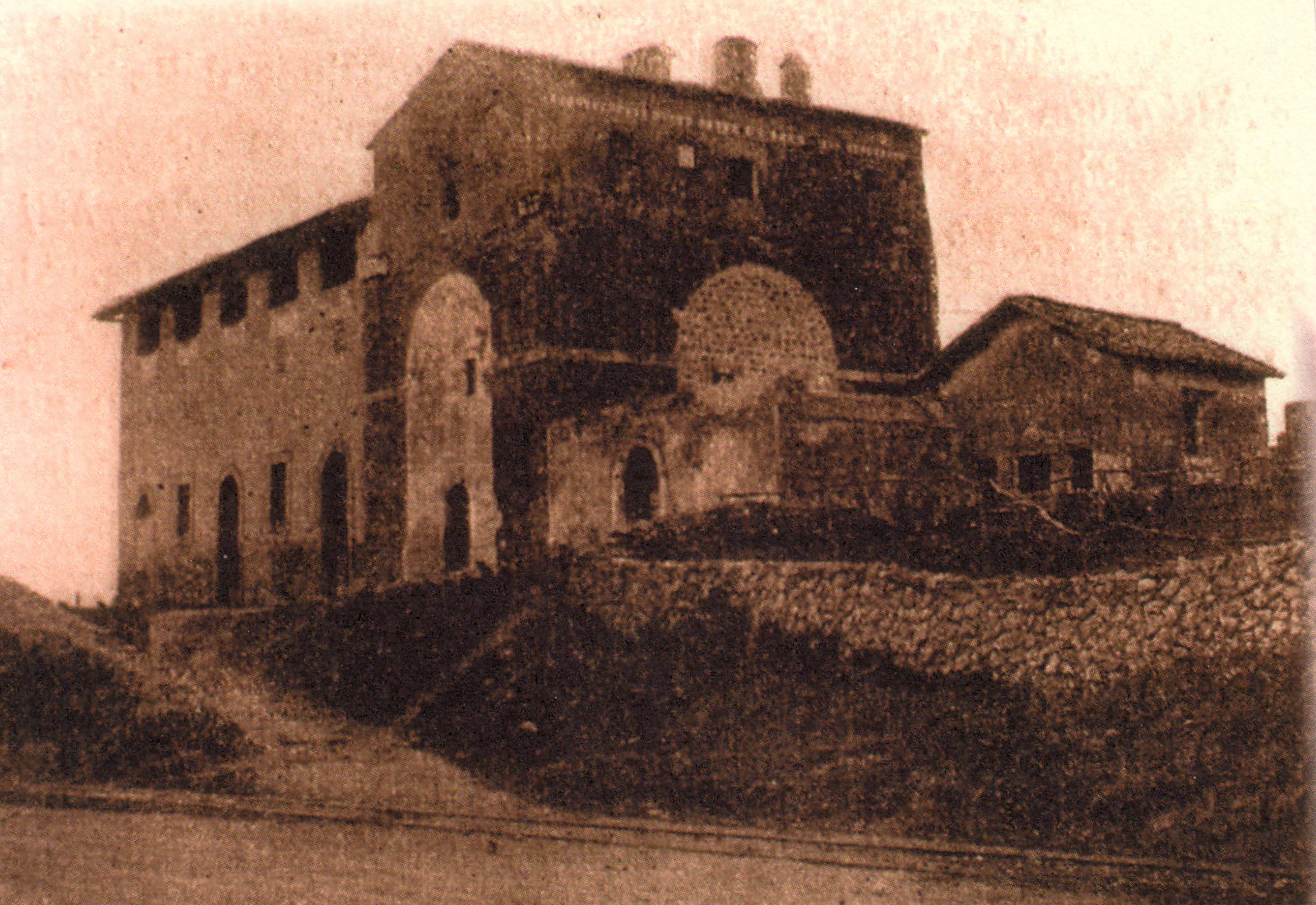
The Arch of Malborghetto

- Torre di Pietra Pertusa, in Via Flaminia. A medieval tower. 42.040854°N 12.479506°E
- Arch of Malborghetto, in Via Barlassina (km. 19 di via Flaminia). A 4th-century Roman tetrapylon.
- Torre di Orlando or Torre di Prima Porta, in Via della Villa di Livia. A 14th-century tower. 42.001123°N 12.491133°E

=== Religious buildings ===
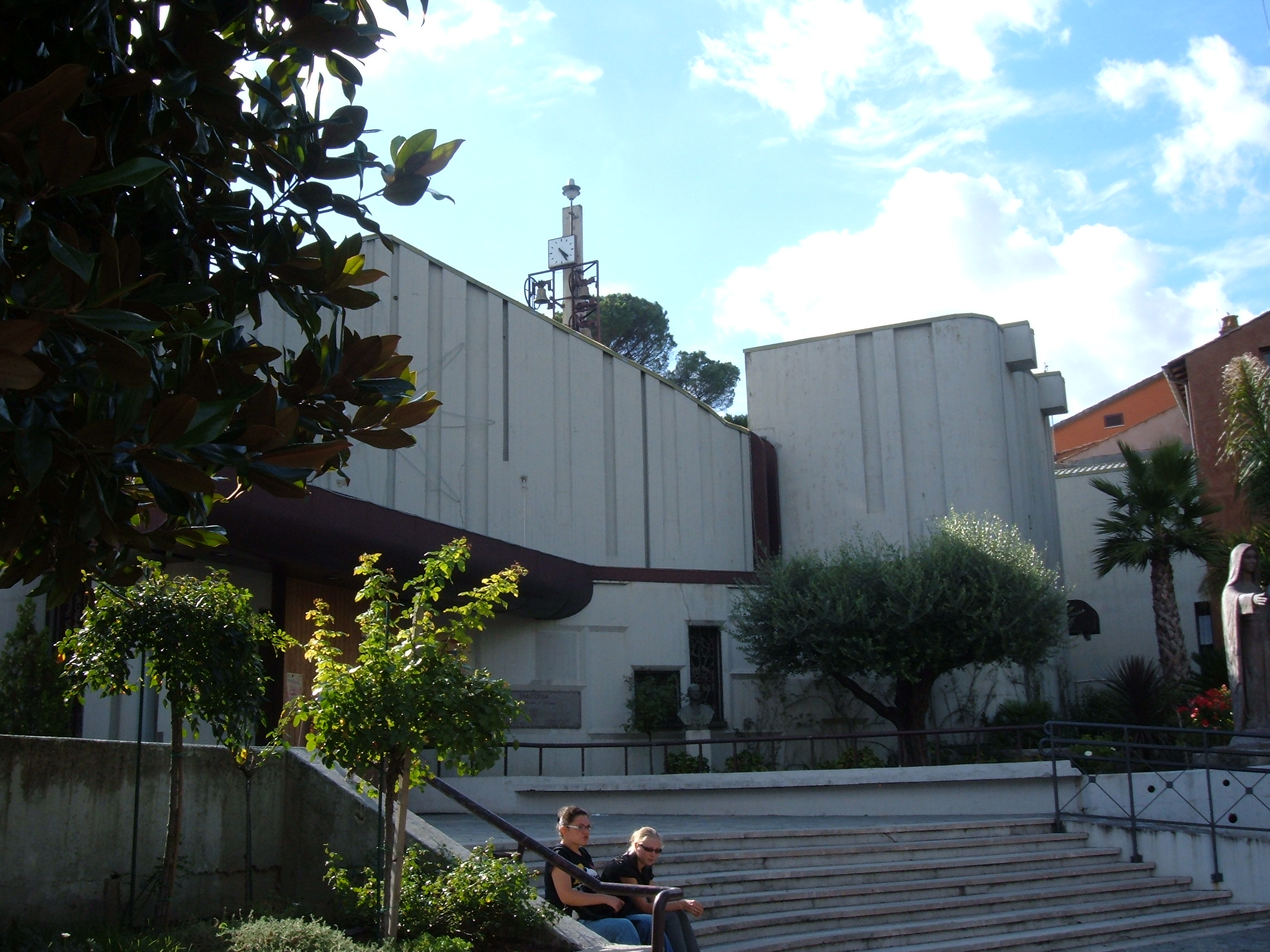
The new church of Santi Urbano e Lorenzo

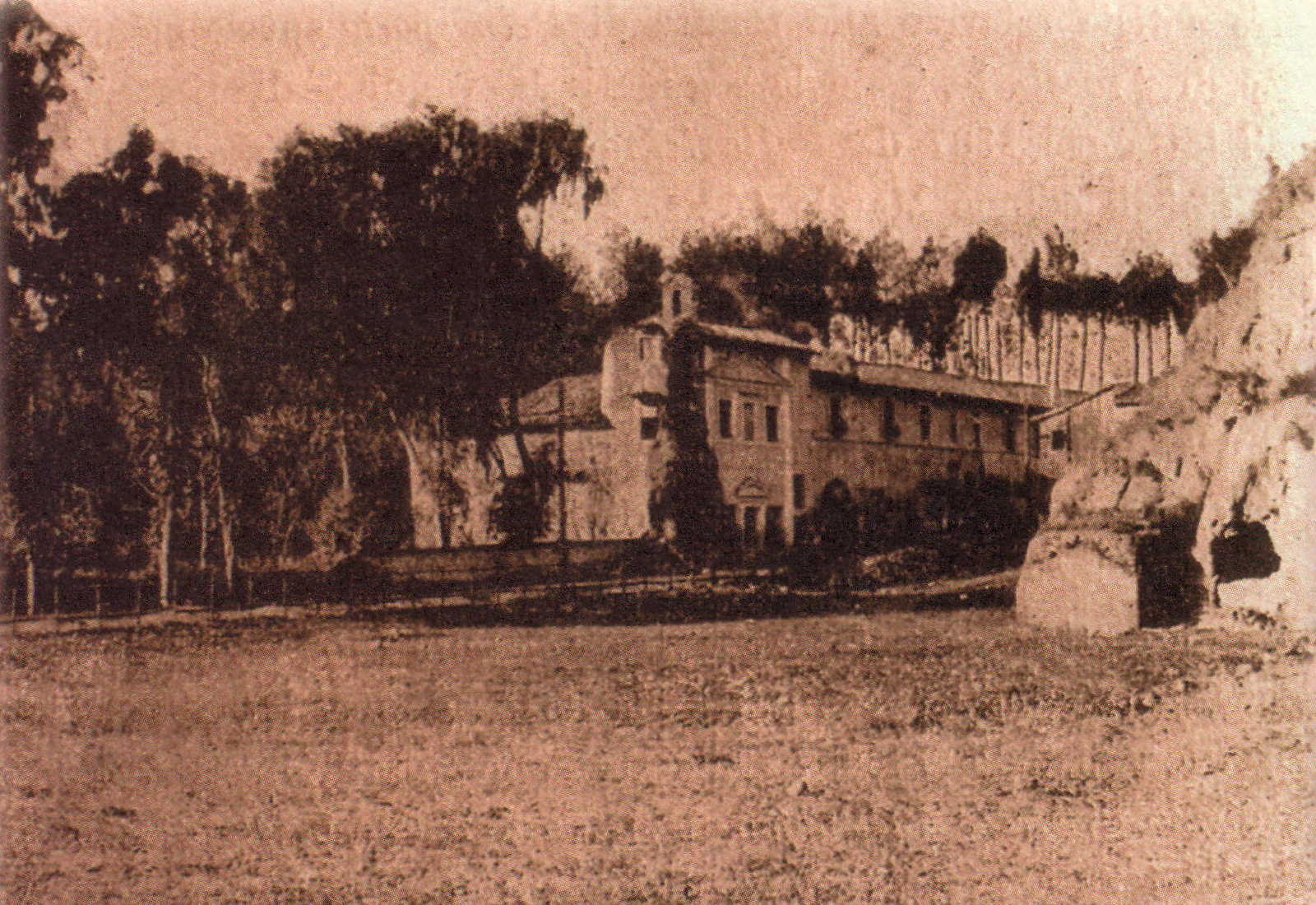
The old church of Santi Urbano e Lorenzo

- Chapel of Malborghetto, in Via Barlassina. 18th-century chapel. 42.052178°N 12.486908°E

it is a subsidiary place of worship of the parish of Santi Urbano e Lorenzo a Prima Porta.

- Church of Santi Urbano e Lorenzo, in Via della Villa di Livia. A 20th-century church.
- Chapel of Sant'Elisabetta, in Via di Santa Cornelia. A 20th-century chapel. 42.012257°N 12.465371°E

it is a subsidiary place of worship of the parish of Sant'Alfonso de' Liguori.

- Church of Sant'Alfonso de' Liguori, in Via della Giustiniana. A 20th-century church. 42.005402°N 12.479982°E

Parish church erected on 1 October 1975 according to the decree "Pernotum quidem est" of Cardinal Vicar Ugo Poletti.

- Church of Santi Elisabetta e Zaccaria, in Via Sulbiate. A 21st-century church (2007–09).
- Cimitero Flaminio, in Via Flaminia. A 20th-century cemetery (1941).
- Church of San Michele Arcangelo al Flaminio, in Via Flaminia. Church inside the Cimitero Flaminio.

it is a subsidiary place of worship of the parish of Santi Urbano e Lorenzo a Prima Porta.

=== Archaeological sites ===
- Villa di Quarto di Montebello, in Via Flaminia (9th mile of Via Flaminia). A 1st-century BC Roman villa 42.002233°N 12.493622°E
- Roman villa of the Cimitero Flaminio, in Viale della Villa Romana (1st mile of Via Tiberina). A 1st-century BC Roman villa 42.011856°N 12.500090°E
- Villa della Via Tiberina, in Via Tiberina (1st mile of Via Tiberina). A 1st-century BC Roman villa 42.006831°N 12.501266°E
- Villa di Livia ad gallinas albas, in Via della Villa di Livia (9th mile of Via Flaminia). A 1st-century BC Roman villa
- Roman cistern near the Villa of Livia, in Piazza di Saxa Rubra. A 1st-century BC cistern 42.001325°N 12.493242°E
- Tomba delle Centocelle, in Via Flaminia. An imperial age sepulchre. 42.023979°N 12.486861°E
- Arch near Santi Urbano e Lorenzo, in Via della Villa di Livia. An imperial age arch. 42.001272°N 12.492746°E
- Tumulo di Monte Oliviero, in Via del Fosso di Monte Oliviero. An Etruscan sepulchre. 42.014218°N 12.448017°E
- Villa della Terma, in Via Flaminia, on the right bank of the Marrana di Prima Porta. A 3rd-century villa

== Gallery ==
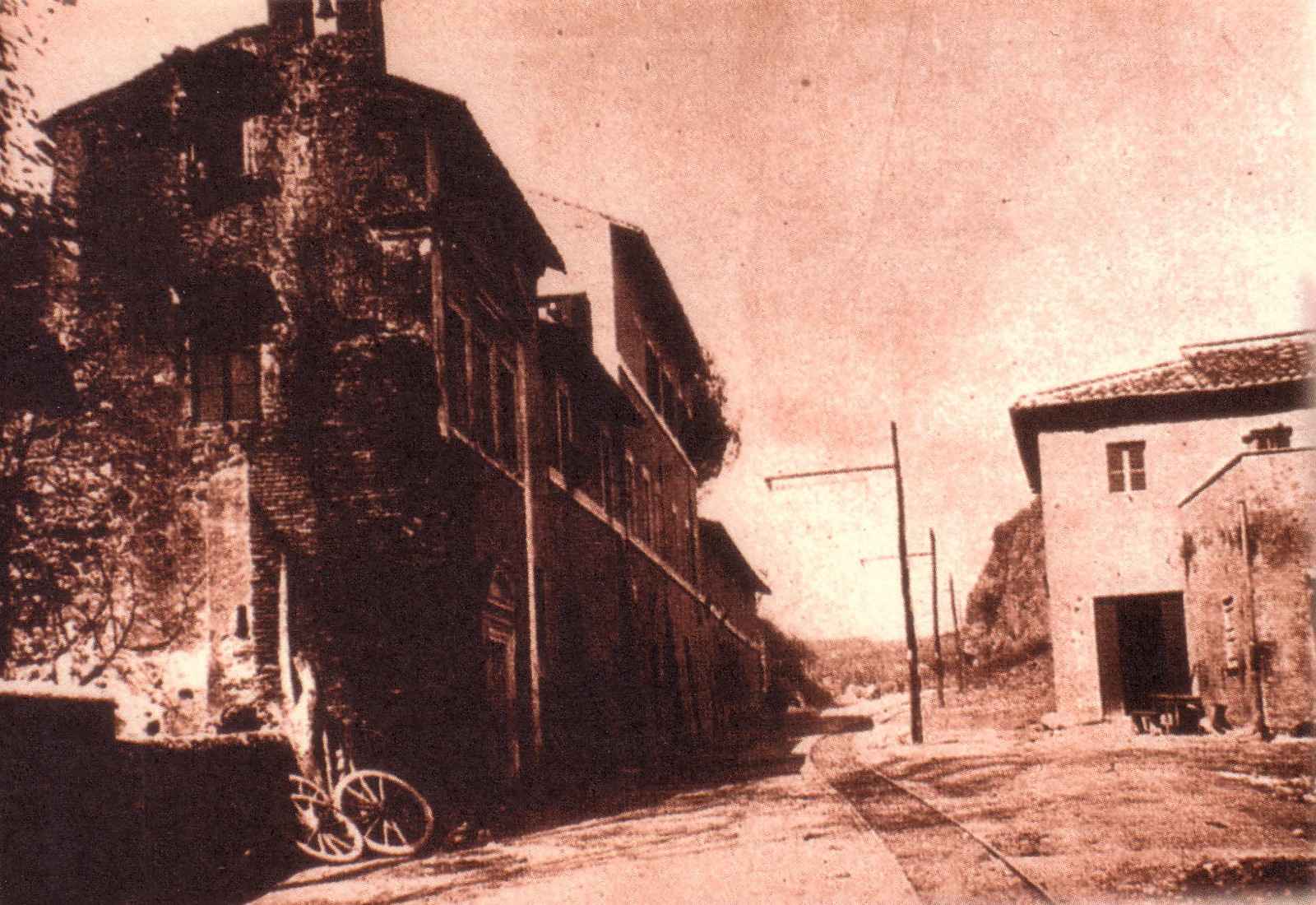
Old railway in Via Flaminia

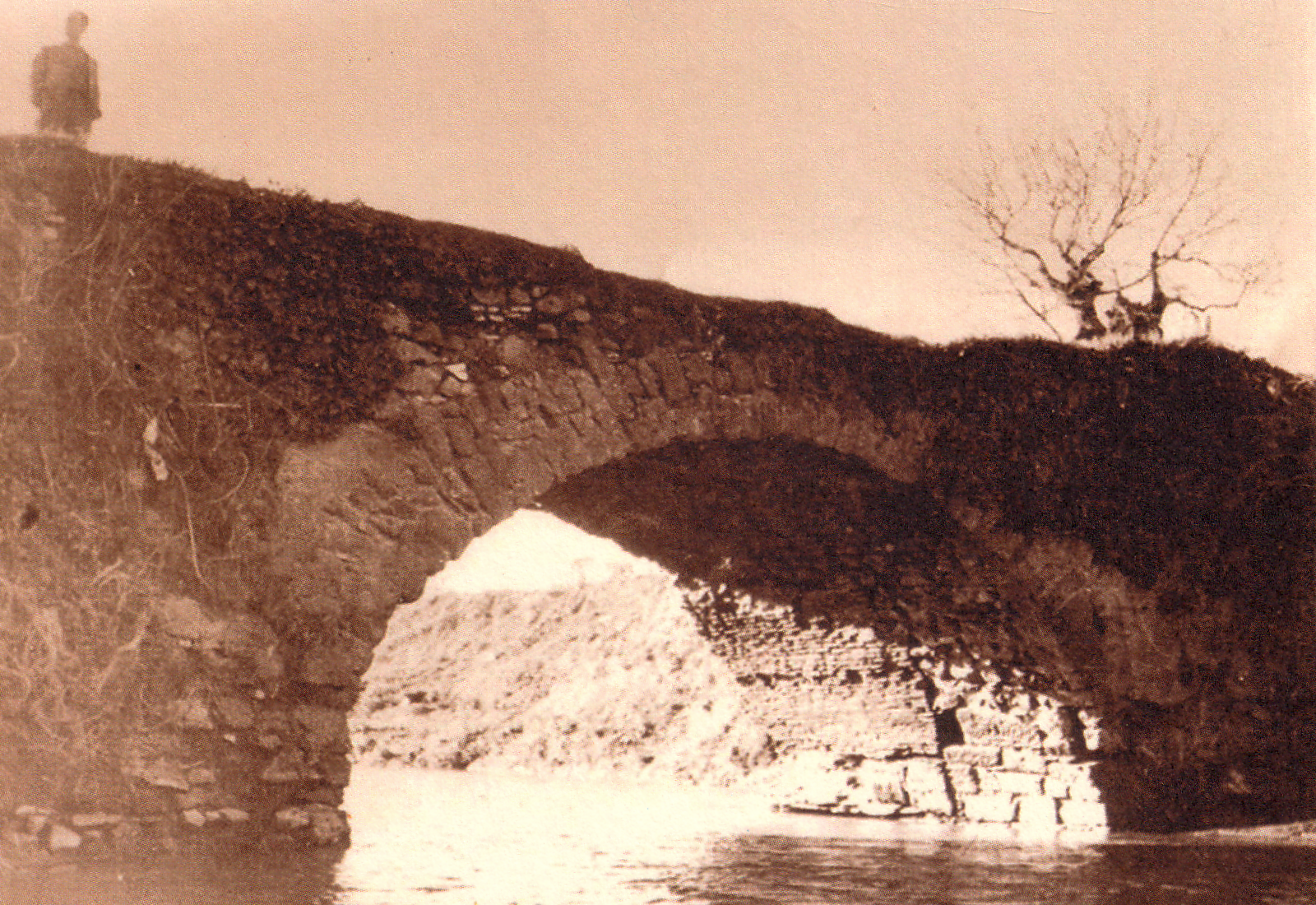
Old bridge of La Celsa

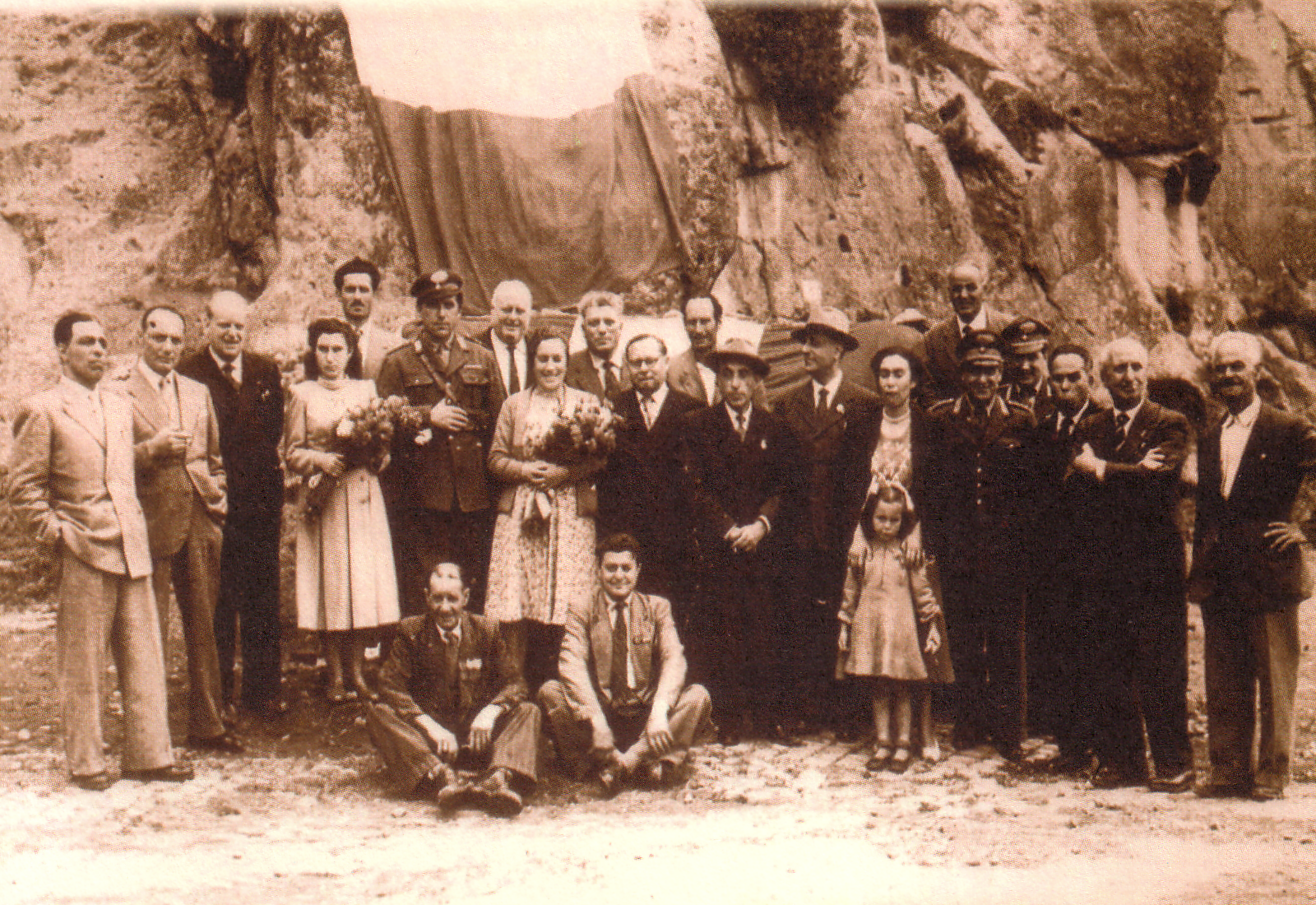
Inauguration of the monument to the fallen soldiers

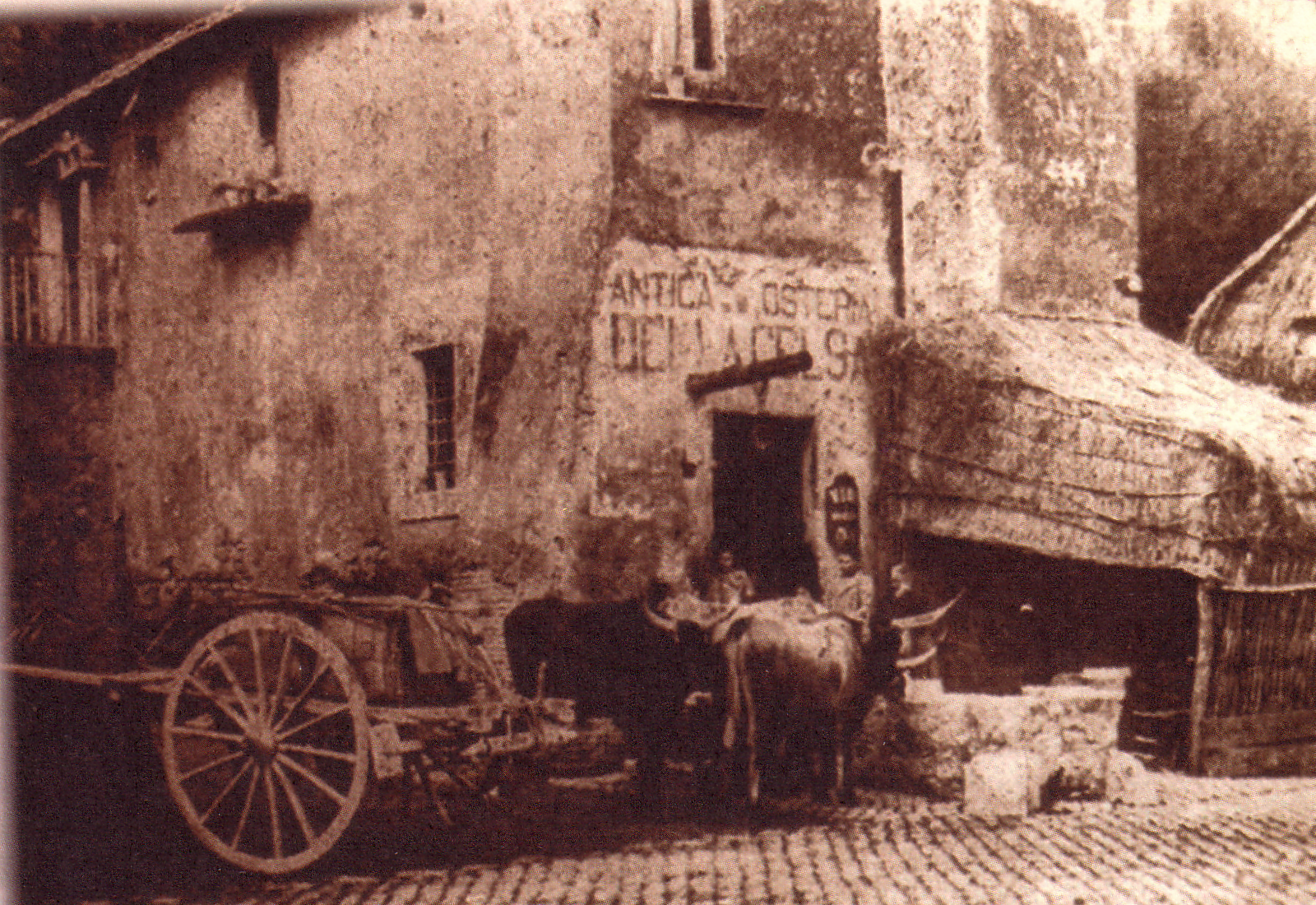
Old inn of La Celsa

== Bibliography ==
- Marina De Franceschini (2005). Ville dell'Agro romano. Rome: L'Erma di Bretschneider. ISBN 978-88-8265-311-8.
