= Erba =

Erba may refer to:

== Places ==
China

- Erba, Wuwei County (二坝镇), town in Wuwei County, Anhui
- Erba, Harbin (二八镇), town in Hulan District, Harbin

Italy

- Erba, Lombardy, a comune in the Province of Como
- Caslino d'Erba, a comune in the Province of Como, Lombardy
- Lurago d'Erba, a comune in the Province of Como, Lombardy

== People ==
- Erba-Odescalchi, an Italian aristocratic family
- Luciano Erba, an Italian poet
