= Orsenigo, Lombardy =

Orsenigo Ursenìgh (Lombard)
- Comune
- Comune di Orsenigo
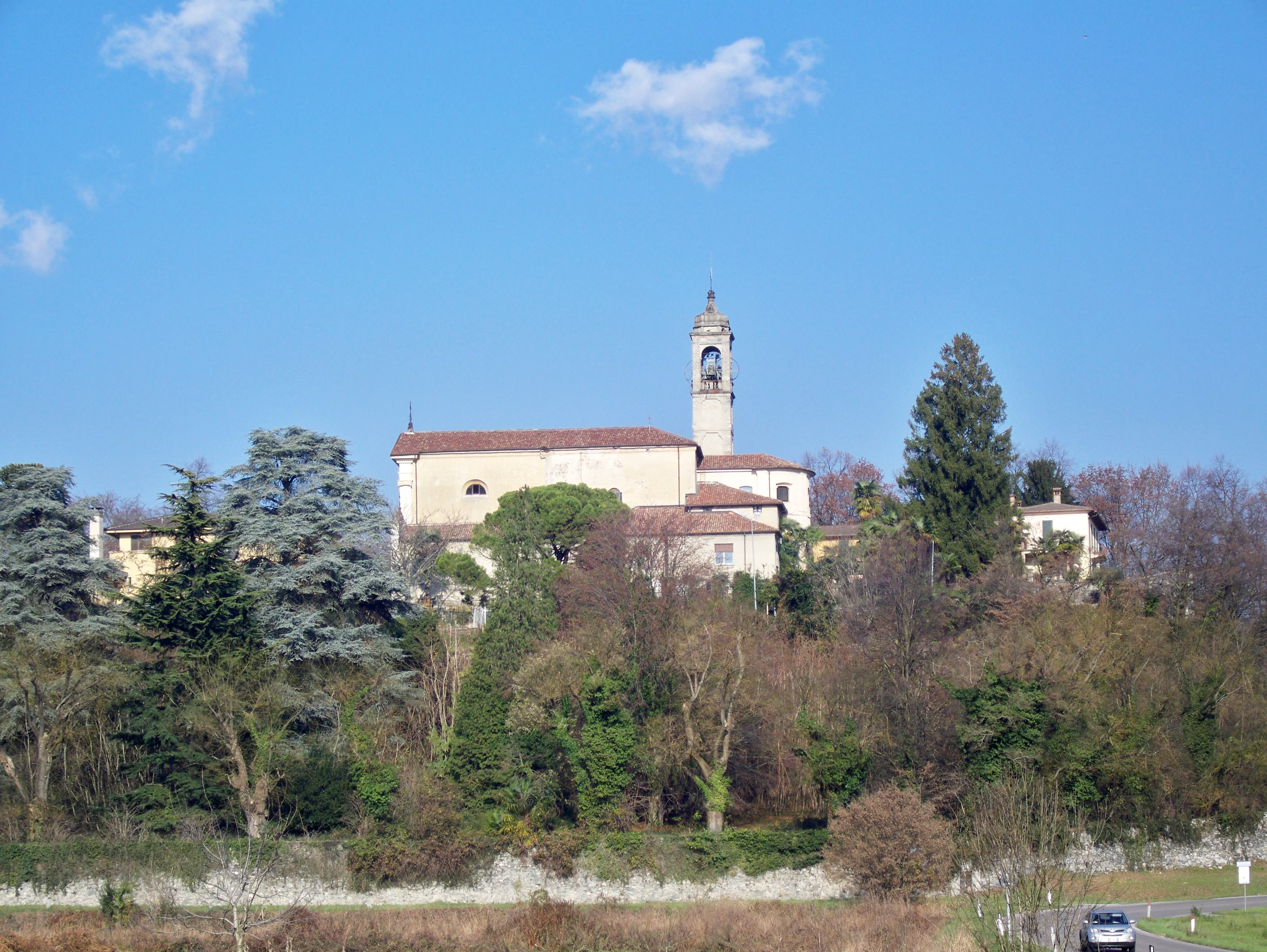

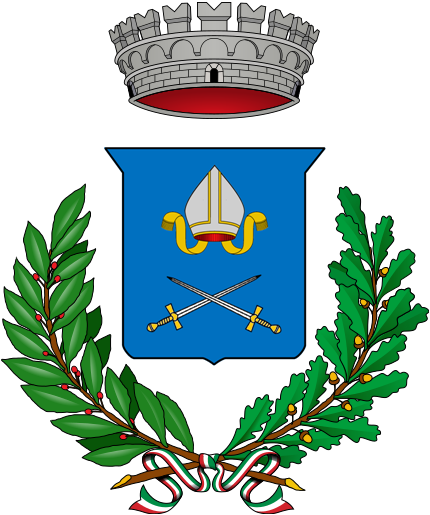
- Coat of arms

- Location within Italy Location within Lombardy
- Coordinates: 45°47′N 9°11′E
- Country: Italy
- Region: Lombardy
- Province: Como (CO)

Government
  - Mayor: Maddalena Pinti

Area
  - Total: 4.46 km^{2} (1.72 sq mi)
- Elevation: 390 m (1,280 ft)

Population (Dec. 2004)
  - Total: 2,457
  - Density: 551/km^{2} (1,430/sq mi)
- Demonym: Orsenighesi
- Time zone: UTC+1 (CET)
  - Summer (DST): UTC+2 (CEST)
- Postal code: 22030
- Dialing code: 031
- Patron saint: Saint Martin
- Website: Official website

Orsenigo (Brianzöö: Ursenìgh [urseˈniːk]) is a comune (municipality) in the Province of Como in the Italian region Lombardy, located about 35 kilometres (22 mi) north of Milan and about 9 km (6 mi) southeast of Como.

Orsenigo borders the following municipalities: Albavilla, Albese con Cassano, Alserio, Alzate Brianza, Anzano del Parco, Cantù, Capiago Intimiano, Montorfano.
