= Labaro =

- Zona of Rome
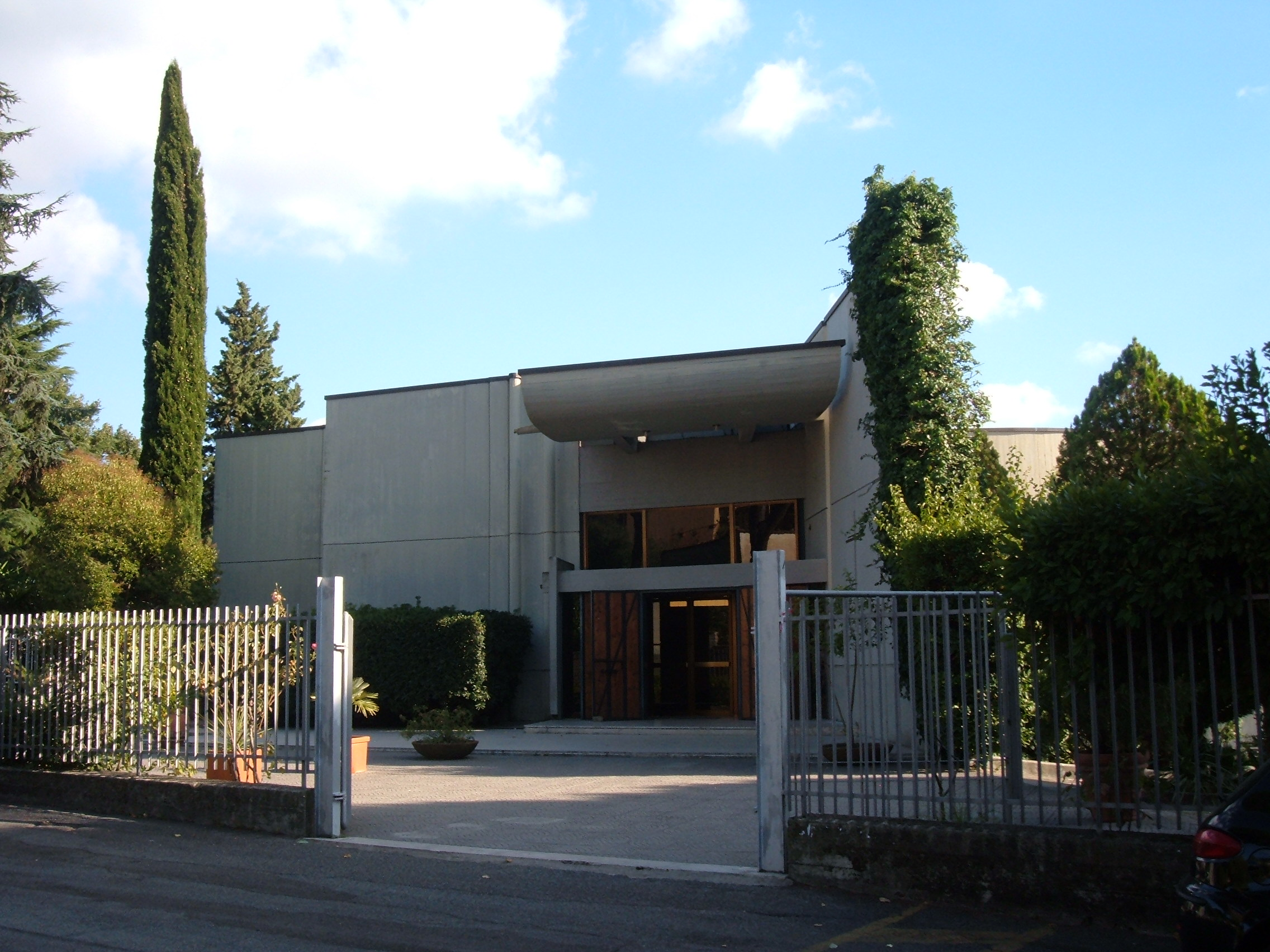
- The church of San Melchiade

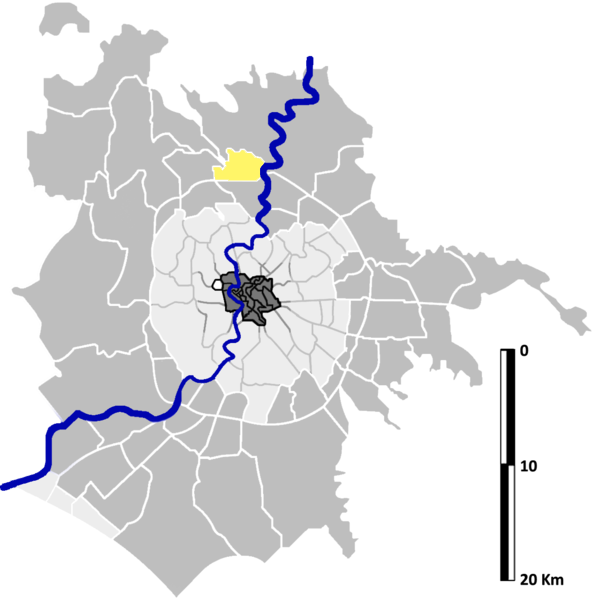
- Position of the zona within the city
- Country: Italy
- Region: Lazio
- Province: Rome
- Comune: Rome

Area
  - Total: 3.5289 sq mi (9.1398 km^{2})

Population (2016)
  - Total: 16,305
  - Density: 4,620.4/sq mi (1,783.96/km^{2})
- Time zone: UTC+1 (CET)
  - Summer (DST): UTC+2 (CEST)

Labaro is the 57th zona of Rome, identified by the initials Z. LVII. It is located 11 kilometres north of the city center, along the Via Flaminia, just outside the Grande Raccordo Anulare.

== History ==
The zone takes its name from a curious event that occurred to Emperor Constantine the Great, when, during the Battle of Saxa Rubra (312), the labarum fell out of his hand. The labarum was a military standard that displayed the "Chi-Rho" symbol, a christogram formed from the first two Greek letters of the word "Christ" (Greek: ΧΡΙΣΤΟΣ, or Χριστός) — Chi (χ) and Rho (ρ).

According to another theory, the name Labaro derives from a medieval interpretation of the Latin word Rubrae (which became Lubrae and then Labarum). This theory associates the toponym to the name of nearby localities, such as Grottarossa (red cavern) and Saxa Rubra (red stones), whose names are connected to local geological structure.

== Geography ==
Labaro is located in the northern part of the municipality of Rome, near the GRA and the river Tiber.

The territory of Settecamini includes a portion of the urban zone 20M Labaro.

=== Boundaries ===
To the north, the zone borders with Zona Prima Porta (Z. LVIII), from which is separated by the stretch of Via della Giustiniana between the river Cremera and the Fosso di Monte Oliviero, then by the stream itself up to the Tiber.

Eastward, it borders with Zona Marcigliana (Z. III), whose boundary is outlined by the river Tiber, up to the Ponte di Castel Giubileo.

To the south, Labaro borders with Zona Grottarossa (Z. LVI), whose border is marked by the stretch of the GRA between the Ponte di Castel Giubileo and Via Veientana.

Westward, Labaro borders with Zona La Giustiniana (Z. LIV), from which is separated by Via Veientana and by Via della Giustiniana, up to the river Cremera.

=== Odonymy ===
Streets and squares of Labaro are generally named after towns of Friuli-Venezia Giulia and Lombardy or after Italian artists and historians. Odonyms of the zone can be categorized as follows:

- Artists, e.g. Via Salvino degli Armati, Via Neri di Bicci, Via Pietro Duranti, Via Giulio Frascheri, Via Mastro Gabriello, Via Ottavio Rodella;
- Local toponyms, e.g. Via della Fornace Vignolo, Via Frassineto, Viale delle Galline Bianche, Via della Giustiniana, Via del Labaro, Via dei Monti della Valchetta, Via di Quarto Annunziata, Via della Riserva di Livia, Via Rubra, Via Valchetta Cartoni, Via della Villa di Livia;
- Historians, e.g. Via Ernesto Buonaiuti, Via Vittorio Cian, Via Emilio Lavagnino, Via Pietro Toesca, Via Lionello Venturi;
- Towns of Friuli-Venezia Giulia, e.g. Via Clauzetto, Viale Gemona del Friuli, Via Magnano in Riviera, Via Moggio Udinese, Largo Nimis, Via Trasaghis, Via Tricesimo;
- Towns of Lombardy, e.g. Piazza Arcisate, Via Bellagio, Via Brembate, Via Busto Arsizio, Largo Castelseprio, Via Chiavenna, Via Dalmine, Largo Foppolo, Via Galbiate, Via Ghisalba, Via Lainate, Via Macherio, Via Melegnano, Via Montichiari, Via Osnago, Largo Quistello, Via Seriate, Via Sotto il Monte, Via Suzzara, Via Valbondione.

== Places of interest ==
=== Civil buildings ===
- Medieval fortification above the La Celsa Mausoleum.
- Torre della Valchetta, in Via Veientana Vetere. A 14th-century tower. 41.988994°N 12.476584°E

=== Religious buildings ===
- San Melchiade, in Via Costantiniana. 20th-century church (1974–77).
- Chapel of Santa Maria Consolatrice, in Via Francesco Torfanini. 20th-century church. 41.992117°N 12.484600°E
- San Crispino da Viterbo, in Via Gussago. 20th-century church (1990).

=== Archaeological sites ===
- Tombs on the cliff of Saxa Rubra, in Via Flaminia. Republican age sepulchres. 41.995193°N 12.495757°E
- La Celsa Mausoleum, in Via Flaminia. An imperial age sepulchre.
- Ponte della Valchetta, over the stream Valchetta. An imperial age bridge. 41.987186°N 12.494240°E

=== Natural areas ===
- Parco del Labaro, in Via Valbondione.
- Parco Marta Russo, between Viale Gemona del Friuli and Via Magnano in Riviera.

=== Other ===
- Fontana dei Quattro Fiumi, also called Fontanone, in Via dei Monti della Valchetta. A 20th-century fountain (1983–99). 41.994939°N 12.485382°E

Designed by architects Paolo Angeletti and Gaia Remiddi.

- Monument to Giampaolo Borghi, in Via Flaminia. A 20th-century memorial. 41.987732°N 12.494362°E

it commemorates the young fireman Giampaolo Borghi, perished on September 1st, 1965 while trying to rescue a kid from a Tiber flooding.
