= Anzano =

Anzano may refer to:

- Anzano del Parco, a comune in Lombardy, Italy
- Anzano di Puglia, a comune in Apulia, Italy
