= Alserio =

Alserio Alzerich (Lombard)
- Comune
- Comune di Alserio
- Location within Italy Location within Lombardy
- Coordinates: 45°47′N 9°12′E
- Country: Italy
- Region: Lombardy
- Province: Province of Como (CO)

Area
  - Total: 1.9 km^{2} (0.73 sq mi)

Population (Dec. 2004)
  - Total: 1,127
  - Density: 590/km^{2} (1,500/sq mi)
- Time zone: UTC+1 (CET)
  - Summer (DST): UTC+2 (CEST)
- Postal code: 22040
- Dialing code: 031

Alserio (Brianzöö: Alzerich) is a comune (municipality) in the Province of Como in the Italian region Lombardy, located about 35 kilometres (22 mi) north of Milan and about 10 kilometres (6 mi) southeast of Como. As of 31 December 2004, it had a population of 1,127 and an area of 1.9 square kilometres (0.73 mi^{2}).

Alserio borders the following municipalities: Albavilla, Anzano del Parco, Monguzzo, Orsenigo.

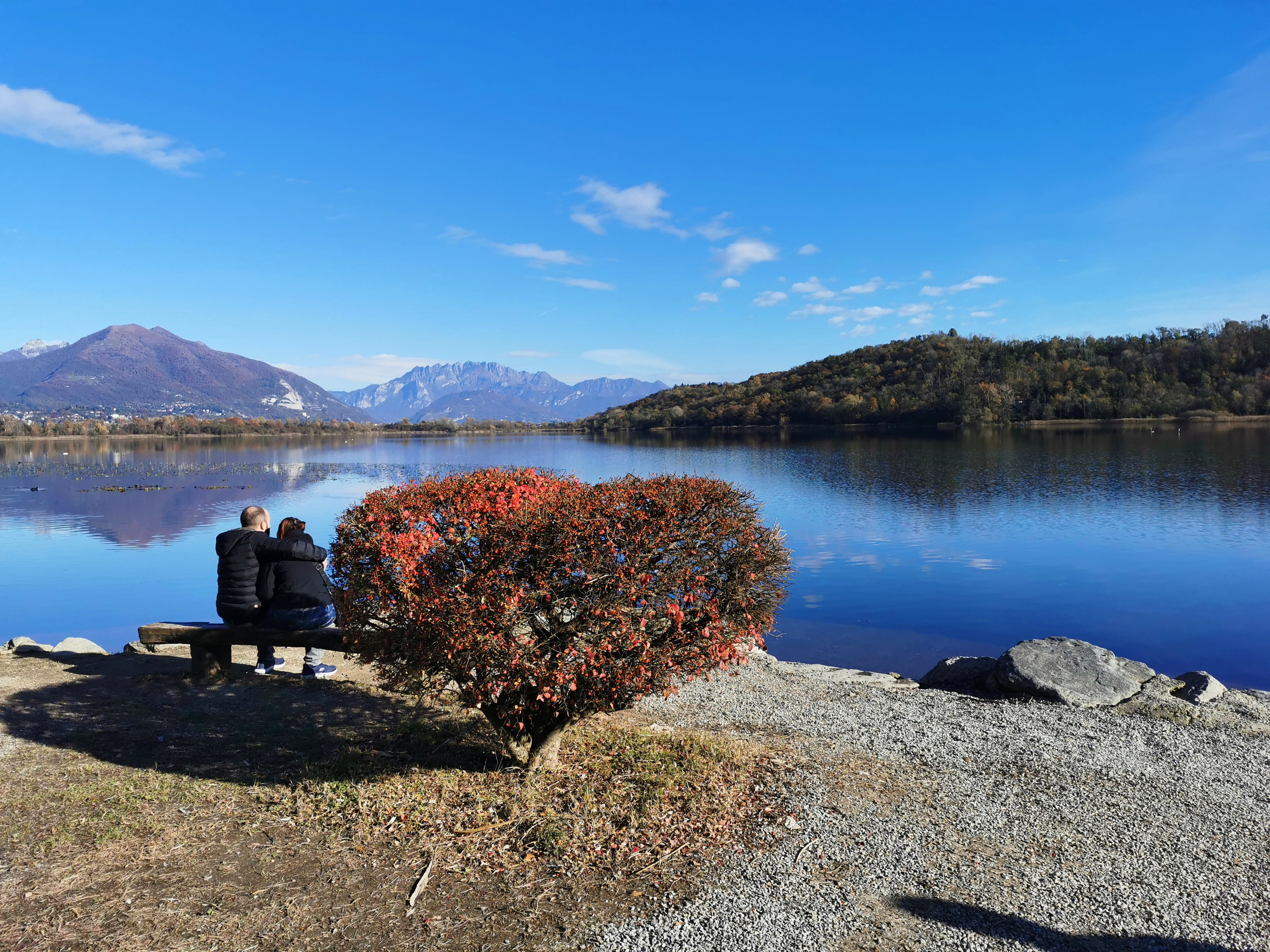
Alserio: Lake Alserio

== Demographic evolution ==
Historical population

| Year | Pop. | ±% |
|---|---|---|
| 1861 | 683 | — |
| 1871 | 760 | +11.3% |
| 1881 | 752 | −1.1% |
| 1901 | 745 | −0.9% |
| 1911 | 729 | −2.1% |

| Year | Pop. | ±% |
|---|---|---|
| 1921 | 709 | −2.7% |
| 1931 | 615 | −13.3% |
| 1936 | 555 | −9.8% |
| 1951 | 638 | +15.0% |
| 1961 | 677 | +6.1% |

| Year | Pop. | ±% |
|---|---|---|
| 1971 | 735 | +8.6% |
| 1981 | 785 | +6.8% |
| 1991 | 876 | +11.6% |
| 2001 | 1,110 | +26.7% |

Source: Data from ISTAT
