= Merone =

Merone Merùn (Lombard)
- Comune
- Comune di Merone
- Location within Italy Location within Lombardy
- Coordinates: 45°47′N 9°15′E
- Country: Italy
- Region: Lombardy
- Province: Como (CO)

Government
  - Mayor: Giovanni Vanossi

Area
  - Total: 3.2 km^{2} (1.2 sq mi)
- Elevation: 280 m (920 ft)

Population (31 December 2013)
  - Total: 4,195
  - Density: 1,300/km^{2} (3,400/sq mi)
- Demonym: Meronesi
- Time zone: UTC+1 (CET)
  - Summer (DST): UTC+2 (CEST)
- Postal code: 22046
- Dialing code: 031
- Website: Official website

Merone (Brianzöö: Merùn [meˈrũː]) is a comune (municipality) in the Province of Como in the Italian region Lombardy, located about 35 kilometres (22 mi) north of Milan and about 13 kilometres (8 mi) southeast of Como.

Merone borders the following municipalities: Costa Masnaga, Erba, Eupilio, Lambrugo, Lurago d'Erba, Monguzzo, Rogeno.

== Twin towns ==
Merone is twinned with:

- Noyarey, France, since 2004
