= Carugo =

Carugo Carugh (Lombard)
- Comune
- Comune di Carugo
- Location within Italy Location within Lombardy
- Coordinates: 45°43′N 9°12′E
- Country: Italy
- Region: Lombardy
- Province: Province of Como (CO)

Area
  - Total: 4.1 km^{2} (1.6 sq mi)

Population (Dec. 2004)
  - Total: 5,729
  - Density: 1,400/km^{2} (3,600/sq mi)
- Time zone: UTC+1 (CET)
  - Summer (DST): UTC+2 (CEST)
- Postal code: 22060
- Dialing code: 031

Carugo (Brianzöö: Carugh [kaˈryːk]) is a comune (municipality) in the Province of Como in the Italian region Lombardy, located about 30 kilometres (19 mi) north of Milan and about 14 kilometres (8.7 mi) southeast of Como. As of 31 December 2004, it had a population of 5,729 and an area of 4.1 square kilometres (1.6 mi^{2}).

Carugo borders the following municipalities: Arosio, Brenna, Giussano, Inverigo, Mariano Comense.

== Demographic evolution ==
Historical population

Year	Pop.	±%
1861	1,098	—
1871	1,253	+14.1%
1881	1,244	−0.7%
1901	1,506	+21.1%
1911	1,715	+13.9%

Year	Pop.	±%
1921	1,773	+3.4%
1931	2,006	+13.1%
1936	2,301	+14.7%
1951	2,753	+19.6%
1961	3,762	+36.7%

Year	Pop.	±%
1971	4,564	+21.3%
1981	4,593	+0.6%
1991	4,789	+4.3%
2001	5,324	+11.2%

Source: Data from ISTAT
