= Arosio =

Arosio Aroeus (Lombard)
- Comune
- Comune di Arosio
- Location within Italy Location within Lombardy
- Coordinates: 45°43′N 9°13′E
- Country: Italy
- Region: Lombardy
- Province: Province of Como (CO)

Area
  - Total: 2.7 km^{2} (1.0 sq mi)
- Elevation: 300 m (980 ft)

Population (Dec. 2004)
  - Total: 4,521
  - Density: 1,700/km^{2} (4,300/sq mi)
- Demonym: Arosiani
- Time zone: UTC+1 (CET)
  - Summer (DST): UTC+2 (CEST)
- Postal code: 22060
- Dialing code: 031
- Patron saint: SS. Nazario e Celso
- Saint day: 28 July
- Website: Official website

Arosio (Brianzöö: Aroeus; locally Roeus) is a comune (municipality) in the Province of Como in the Italian region Lombardy, located about 30 kilometres (19 mi) north of Milan and about 15 kilometres (9 mi) southeast of Como. As of 31 December 2004, it had a population of 4,521 and an area of 2.7 square kilometres (1.0 mi^{2}).

Arosio borders the following municipalities: Carugo, Giussano, Inverigo.

Arosio is a valuable town in Brianza a geographical area at the foot of the Alps, and is a part of the Parco della Valle del Lambro. It is crossed by two important roads named Nuova Vallassina and Novedratese

The town hosted the Institute for Invalids where Don Carlo Gnocchi founded the Federation for Mutilated Children, in 1952 began the Juvenile Foundation, today known as the Don Carlo Gnocchi – ONLUS Foundation.

The bird observatory Osservatorio Ornitologico di Arosio was established in 1710. It has a museum.

The municipality also gives rise to the surname Arosio, very common in Brianza

== Sports ==
The football team Stella Azzurra Arosio, which plays in the Seconda Categoria, is based in Arosio. The club is also affiliated with AC Monza.

== Demographic evolution ==
Historical population
| Year | Pop. | ±% |
|---|---|---|
| 1861 | 910 | — |
| 1871 | 945 | +3.8% |
| 1881 | 979 | +3.6% |
| 1901 | 1,101 | +12.5% |
| 1911 | 1,263 | +14.7% |
| 1921 | 1,395 | +10.5% |
| 1931 | 1,781 | +27.7% |
| 1936 | 1,757 | −1.3% |
| 1951 | 2,195 | +24.9% |
| 1961 | 2,622 | +19.5% |
| 1971 | 3,548 | +35.3% |
| 1981 | 3,662 | +3.2% |
| 1991 | 4,271 | +16.6% |
| 2001 | 4,469 | +4.6% |
Source: ISTAT
