= Lambrugo =

Lambrugo Lambrügh (Lombard)
- Comune
- Comune di Lambrugo
- Coat of arms

- Location within Italy Location within Lombardy
- Coordinates: 45°45′N 9°14′E
- Country: Italy
- Region: Lombardy
- Province: Province of Como (CO)
- Frazioni: Momberto, Galletto, Cascina Giulia, Resegone

Government
  - Mayor: Flavio Mauri

Area
  - Total: 1.9 km^{2} (0.73 sq mi)
- Elevation: 290 m (950 ft)

Population (11/30/2019)
  - Total: 2,510
  - Density: 1,300/km^{2} (3,400/sq mi)
- Demonym: Lambrughesi
- Time zone: UTC+1 (CET)
  - Summer (DST): UTC+2 (CEST)
- Postal code: 22045
- Dialing code: 031
- Saint day: 4 November
- Website: Official website

Lambrugo (Brianzöö: Lambrügh) is a comune (municipality) in the Province of Como in the Italian region Lombardy, located about 30 kilometres (19 mi) north of Milan and about 14 kilometres (9 mi) southeast of Como. As of 30 November 2019, it had a population of 2,510 and an area of 1.9 km^{2} (0.73 sq mi). The municipality of Lambrugo contains the frazioni (subdivisions, mainly villages and hamlets) Momberto, Galletto, Cascina Giulia, and Resegone. Lambrugo borders the following municipalities: Costa Masnaga, Inverigo, Lurago d'Erba, Merone, Nibionno.

== Physical geography ==
=== Territory ===
The municipal territory has a characteristic triangular shape and borders to the east with the municipalities of Costa Masnaga and Nibionno, to the south with those of Inverigo, to the west with that of Lurago d'Erba, to the north with that of Merone.

Lambrugo is about 30 kilometers from the Lombard capital and 14 from the provincial capital, the city of Como.

=== Geology and hydrography ===
The altitude is between 238 and 340 m a.s.l. with an average height of 290 m a.s.l. registered at the municipal office. The territory is therefore mainly hilly and characterized by numerous wooded areas.

The municipal territory is crossed by the Lambro river and is included in the Lambro Valley Regional Park.

=== Seismology ===
From the seismic point of view Lambrugo presents a very low risk and has been classified as the common zone 4 (low seismicity) by the national civil protection.

=== Climate ===
The climate of Lambrugo is characteristic of the northern Italian plains with cold and fairly rigid winters and summers that are affected by high temperatures; rainfall is concentrated mainly in autumn and spring. The country belongs to the climatic zone E.

Climate data for Lambrugo
| Month | Jan | Feb | Mar | Apr | May | Jun | Jul | Aug | Sep | Oct | Nov | Dec | Year |
|---|---|---|---|---|---|---|---|---|---|---|---|---|---|
| Mean daily maximum °C (°F) | 5 (41) | 8 (46) | 13 (55) | 18 (64) | 22 (72) | 26 (79) | 29 (84) | 28 (82) | 24 (75) | 18 (64) | 10 (50) | 5 (41) | 16.33 (61.39) |
| Mean daily minimum °C (°F) | −2 (28) | 0 (32) | 3 (37) | 7 (45) | 11 (52) | 15 (59) | 17 (63) | 17 (63) | 14 (57) | 8 (46) | 4 (39) | −1 (30) | 7.75 (45.95) |
| Average rainfall mm (inches) | 64 (2.5) | 63 (2.5) | 95 (3.7) | 82 (3.2) | 82 (3.2) | 97 (3.8) | 65 (2.6) | 68 (2.7) | 69 (2.7) | 100 (3.9) | 101 (4.0) | 60 (2.4) | 78.83 (3.10) |
| Average relative humidity (%) | 86 | 78 | 71 | 75 | 72 | 71 | 71 | 72 | 74 | 81 | 85 | 86 | 78 |
| Mean daily daylight hours | 2 | 3 | 5 | 6 | 7 | 8 | 9 | 8 | 6 | 4 | 2 | 2 | 5 |

== Demographic evolution ==
Historical population

| Year | Pop. | ±% |
|---|---|---|
| 1861 | 892 | — |
| 1871 | 892 | +0.0% |
| 1881 | 845 | −5.3% |
| 1901 | 1,222 | +44.6% |
| 1911 | 1,302 | +6.5% |

| Year | Pop. | ±% |
|---|---|---|
| 1921 | 1,230 | −5.5% |
| 1931 | 1,323 | +7.6% |
| 1936 | 1,334 | +0.8% |
| 1951 | 1,496 | +12.1% |
| 1961 | 1,533 | +2.5% |

| Year | Pop. | ±% |
|---|---|---|
| 1971 | 1,707 | +11.4% |
| 1981 | 1,856 | +8.7% |
| 1991 | 2,079 | +12.0% |
| 2001 | 2,181 | +4.9% |
| 2011 | 2,469 | +13.2% |

Source: Data from ISTAT

== Origins of the name ==
According to toponymic hypotheses, the characteristic name of Lambrugo derives from the composition of the Celtic words "Lamber" (Lambro) and "bruig" (village) in the definition of "village near Lambro", precisely to describe the original position of the town.

== History ==
The first traces of Lambrugo's history date back to the V-IV century BC, at the time of the Celtic domination of the Lambro area, the first evidence of which was found in an area raised above the current level of the river since this had once much higher waters.

After the Roman domination, Lambrugo began a period of notable development only from the 11th century when a collateral branch of the noble Milanese Carcano family moved here, who built a castle and in the middle of the century built a Benedictine cloistered monastery, endowing it with extensive possessions. From this division over time two distinct municipalities arose which, however, were unified only in the eighteenth century under the Austrian administration. Also from the Middle Ages and up to the eighteenth century, the area was included in the Pieve di Incino, which in turn was included in the Martesana civil district.

The town was given in fiefdom in 1380 to the powerful Milanese Dal Verme family who maintained the lordship until 1656 when it first passed to the Giussani family and then, on 5 April 1691 to the Crivelli, in the person of Enea I, marquis of Agliate, imperial chamberlain, decurion of Milan and ambassador of the Spanish duchy of Milan in the Swiss Confederation and in the Grisons.

In 1527, the village was conquered by Gian Giacomo Medici, brother of the future Pope Pius IV and maternal uncle of San Carlo Borromeo, who took possession of the local castle and devastated the monastery built in the town, destroying the entire archive in retaliation. His intent, taking advantage of the weakness of Francesco II Sforza and his puppet government on the Duchy of Milan, was to conquer the Lario area for himself.

In 1751 the territory of Lambrugo already extended to the cassinaggi of Momberto and Carpaneia.

The municipal decline began with the suppression of the monastery by the Cisalpine Republic in 1798: the lands were sold separately and the buildings portioned to the local inhabitants, however contributing to the spread of silk spinning. Already at the beginning of the nineteenth century one of the first spinning mills in the area was built on site and already at the beginning of the twentieth century a weaving plant was also built.

An administrative reorganization decree of the Napoleonic Kingdom of Italy dated 1807 sanctioned the aggregation of Lambrugo to the municipality of Lurago and united, a decision which was however repealed with the Restoration.

During the Second World War the town was the scene of some resistance operations in the lower Como area, led by the partisan Giancarlo Puecher Passavalli, gold medal for military valor.

In 1967 the hamlet of Cadea, formerly part of the municipality of Lurago d'Erba, was aggregated to the municipality.
