= Monguzzo =

Monguzzo Monguzz (Lombard)
- Comune
- Comune di Monguzzo
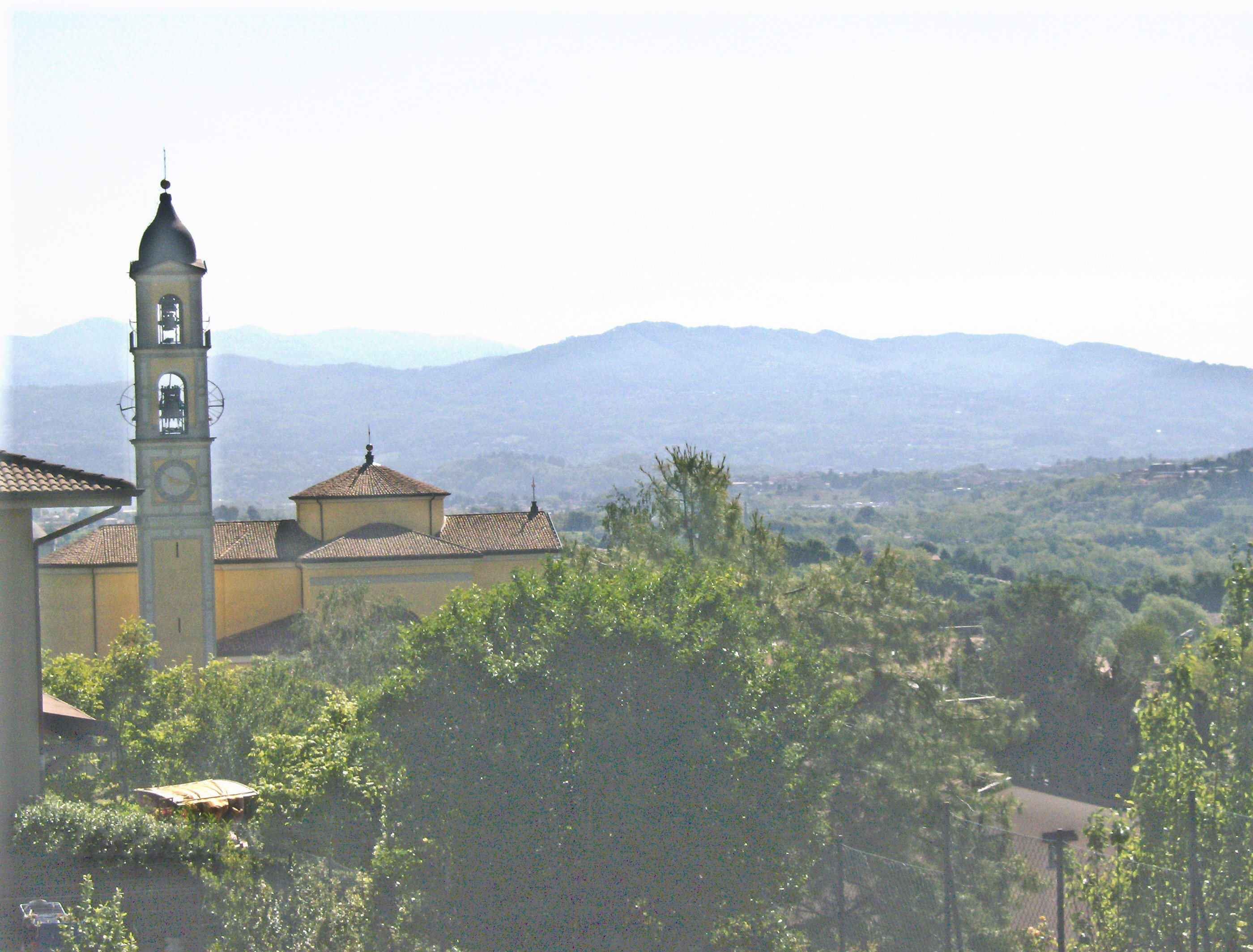

- Location within Italy Location within Lombardy
- Coordinates: 45°47′N 9°14′E
- Country: Italy
- Region: Lombardy
- Province: Como (CO)

Government
  - Mayor: Marco Sangiorgio

Area
  - Total: 3.7 km^{2} (1.4 sq mi)
- Elevation: 320 m (1,050 ft)

Population (31 March 2017)
  - Total: 2,328
  - Density: 630/km^{2} (1,600/sq mi)
- Demonym(s): Perzegatt; monguzzesi
- Time zone: UTC+1 (CET)
  - Summer (DST): UTC+2 (CEST)
- Postal code: 22040
- Dialing code: 031
- Website: Official website

Monguzzo (Brianzöö: Monguzz [mũˈɡyts]) is a comune (municipality) in the Province of Como in the Italian region Lombardy, located about 35 kilometres (22 mi) north of Milan and about 12 kilometres (7 mi) southeast of Como.

Monguzzo borders the following municipalities: Albavilla, Alserio, Anzano del Parco, Erba, Lurago d'Erba, Merone.
