= Brenna, Lombardy =

Brenna
- Comune
- Comune di Brenna
- Location within Italy Location within Lombardy
- Coordinates: 45°45′N 9°11′E
- Country: Italy
- Region: Lombardy
- Province: Province of Como (CO)

Area
  - Total: 4.9 km^{2} (1.9 sq mi)

Population (Dec. 2004)
  - Total: 1,860
  - Density: 380/km^{2} (980/sq mi)
- Demonym: Brennesi
- Time zone: UTC+1 (CET)
  - Summer (DST): UTC+2 (CEST)
- Postal code: 22040
- Dialing code: 031
- Website: Official website

Brenna is a comune (municipality) in the Province of Como in the Italian region Lombardy, located about 30 kilometres (19 mi) north of Milan and about 11 kilometres (7 mi) southeast of Como. As of 31 December 2004, it had a population of 1,860 and an area of 4.9 square kilometres (1.9 mi^{2}).

Brenna borders the following municipalities: Alzate Brianza, Cantù, Carugo, Inverigo, Mariano Comense.

== Demographic evolution ==
Historical population

Year	Pop.	±%
1861	907	—
1871	941	+3.7%
1881	984	+4.6%
1901	997	+1.3%
1911	1,085	+8.8%

Year	Pop.	±%
1921	1,213	+11.8%
1931	1,060	−12.6%
1936	1,098	+3.6%
1951	1,144	+4.2%
1961	1,283	+12.2%

Year	Pop.	±%
1971	1,354	+5.5%
1981	1,474	+8.9%
1991	1,686	+14.4%
2001	1,817	+7.8%

Source: Data from ISTAT

== Twin towns ==
Brenna is twinned with:

- Láchar, Spain
