= Saxa Rubra =

Coordinates: 41.9767°N 12.4911°E

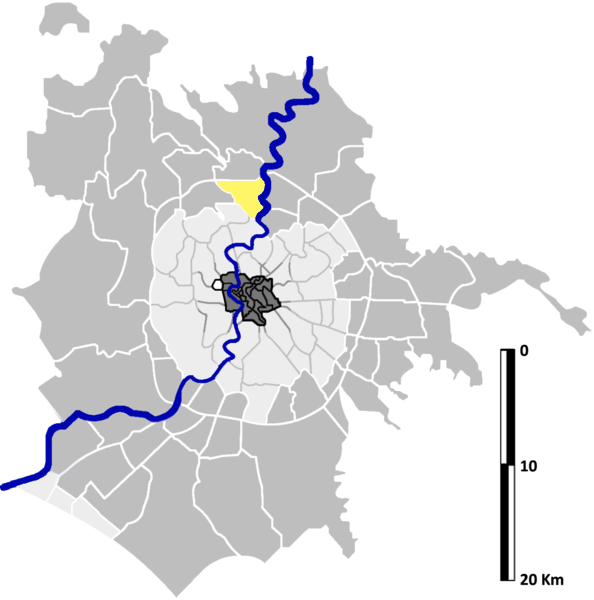
Grottarossa

Saxa Rubra was a village and station on the Roman Flaminian Way, 9 miles (14 km) from Rome, Italy.

It is now the name of a neighborhood north of Rome and of the city's Roma Nord railway station. Situated on the modern Via Flaminia it is also the site of a major RAI public service broadcaster center. The area derived its name from the redness of the tuff rocks, which are still conspicuous around Prima Porta and Grottarossa, both of which have been identified as the current site of Saxa Rubra (Grottarossa, meaning red cave).

== History ==
The name is written Ad Rubras in the Peutingeriana Tabula, while Martial calls the place simply Rubrae. This form of the name is also found in the Jerusalem Itinerary although the proper reference appears to have been Saxa Rubra, which is used both by Livy and Cicero. The former mentions it during the wars between Rome and Veii, in connection with the operations from the Cremera in 478 BC (Liv. ii. 49); and Cicero notes it as a place in the immediate vicinity of Rome, where Marcus Antonius halted before entering the city. (Cic. Phil. ii. 3. 1) It was also here that Antonius, Vespasian's general, arrived on his march upon Rome, when he learned of the successes of the Vitellians and the death of Sabinus. (Tac. Hist. iii. 79.) At a much later period (312) it was also the point to which Maxentius advanced to meet Constantine previous to the battle at the Milvian bridge. (Vict. Caes. 40. § 23.) Martial (l. c.) states that a village had grown up on the spot, as would naturally be the case with a station so immediately in the neighborhood of the city.

On a hill on the right of the Via Flaminia, a little beyond Prima Porta, are considerable ruins, which are believed to be those of the villa of Livia, known by the name of Ad Gallinas, which was situated 9 miles (14 km) from Rome, on the Via Flaminia. (Plin. xv. 30. s. 40; Suet. Galb. 1.)
