= Alzate Brianza =

- Comune
- Comune di Alzate Brianza
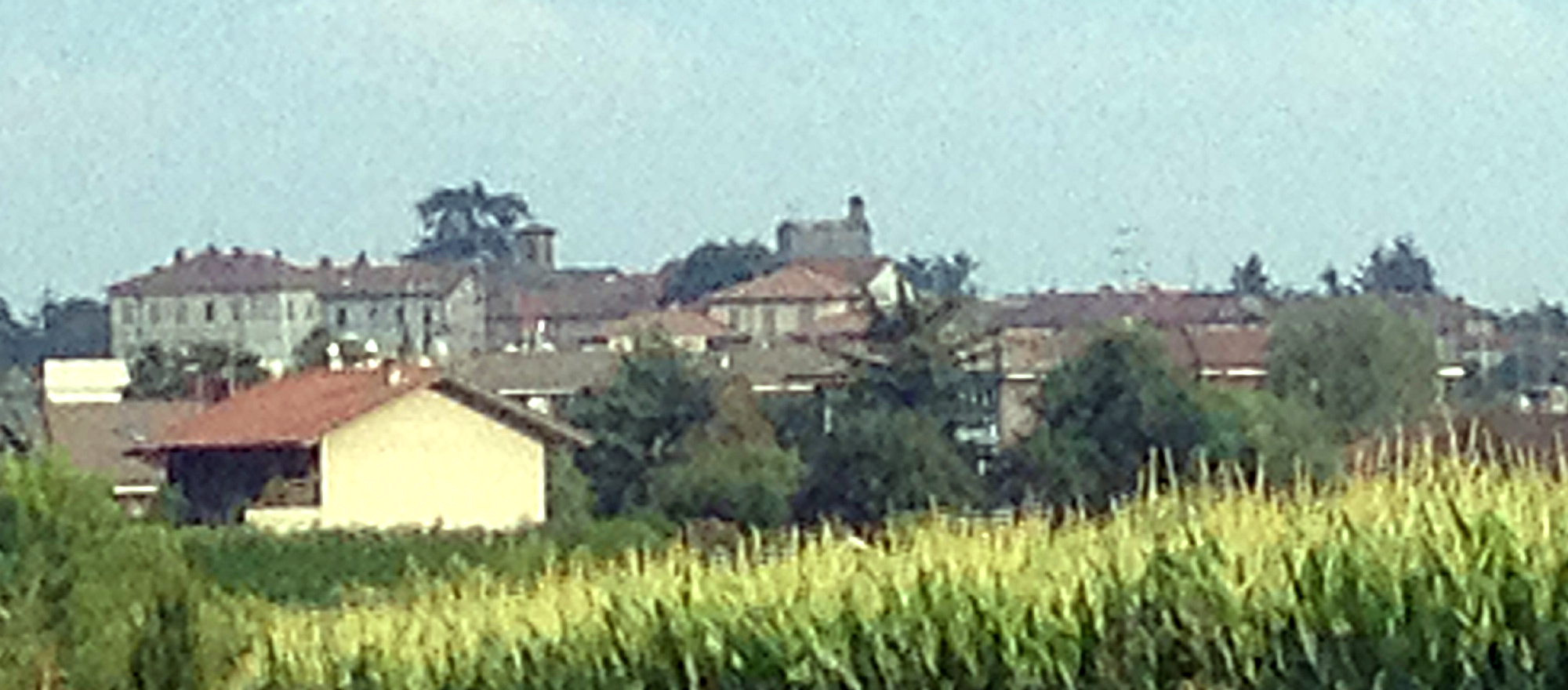
- View of Alzate Brianza

- Location within Italy Location within Lombardy
- Coordinates: 45°46′N 9°11′E
- Country: Italy
- Region: Lombardy
- Province: Como (CO)
- Frazioni: Fabbrica Durini, Mirovano, Verzago

Government
  - Mayor: Frigerio Paolo

Area
  - Total: 7.58 km^{2} (2.93 sq mi)
- Elevation: 341 m (1,119 ft)

Population (31 March 2017)
  - Total: 5,014
  - Density: 661/km^{2} (1,710/sq mi)
- Demonym: Alzatesi
- Time zone: UTC+1 (CET)
  - Summer (DST): UTC+2 (CEST)
- Postal code: 22040
- Dialing code: 031
- Patron saint: Sts. Peter and Paul
- Saint day: 29 June
- Website: Official website

Alzate Brianza (Brianzöö: Alzàa) is a comune (municipality) in the Province of Como in the Italian region Lombardy, located about 35 kilometres (22 mi) north of Milan and about 10 kilometres (6 mi) southeast of Como. Alzate Brianza has a population of about 5000 people, It is surrounded by the comune of Inverigo, Anzano del parco, Brenna, Orsenigo, Lurago d'Erba and Cantù.

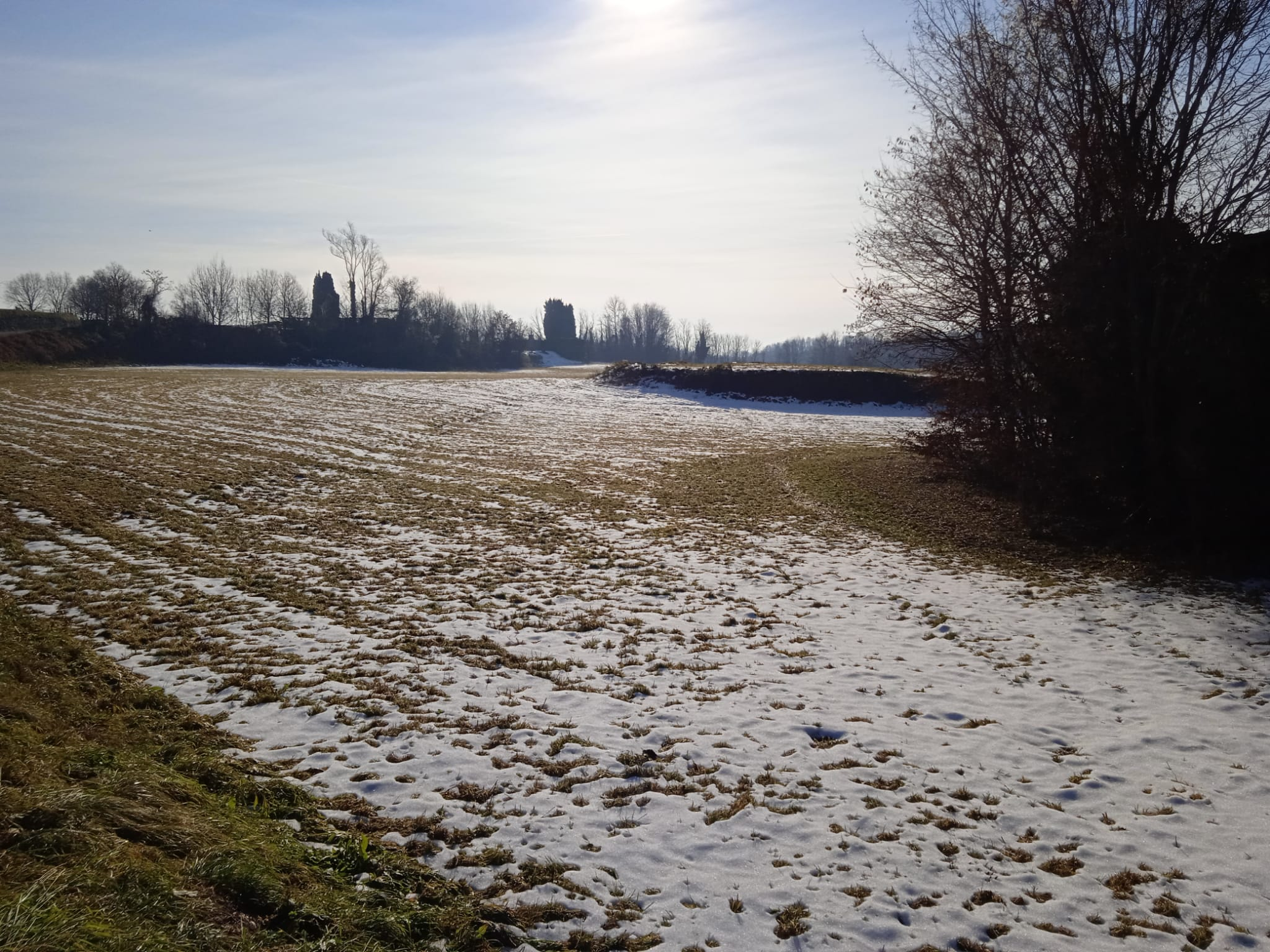
A bit of snow on a farmland in Alzate Brianza
