= Lurago d'Erba =

Lurago d'Erba Luragh (Lombard)
- Comune
- Comune di Lurago d'Erba
- Location within Italy Location within Lombardy
- Coordinates: 45°45′N 9°13′E
- Country: Italy
- Region: Lombardy
- Province: Como (CO)
- Frazioni: Calpuno, Careggia, Colciago, Piazza

Government
  - Mayor: Federico Bassani

Area
  - Total: 4.7 km^{2} (1.8 sq mi)
- Elevation: 351 m (1,152 ft)

Population (31 March 2017)
  - Total: 5,393
  - Density: 1,100/km^{2} (3,000/sq mi)
- Demonym: Luraghesi
- Time zone: UTC+1 (CET)
  - Summer (DST): UTC+2 (CEST)
- Postal code: 22040
- Dialing code: 031
- Patron saint: St. Roch and St. John the Evangelist
- Website: Official website

Lurago d'Erba (Brianzöö: Luragh [lyˈraːk]) is a comune (municipality) in the Province of Como in the Italian region Lombardy, located about 30 kilometres (19 mi) north of Milan and about 13 kilometres (8 mi) southeast of Como.

Lurago d'Erba borders the municipalities of Alzate Brianza, Anzano del Parco, Inverigo, Lambrugo, Merone and Monguzzo.

== Sports ==
The Unione Sportiva Olympic is an amateur football club based in Lurago d’Erba. The team is competing in the Terza Categoria, Group A of Lecco, for the 2024-2025 season. The club is affiliated with Associazione Calcio Monza S.p.A. as part of the Academy program, which aims to promote youth football development and strengthen ties between local amateur clubs and the professional team.
