= Anzano del Parco =

- Comune
- Comune di Anzano del Parco
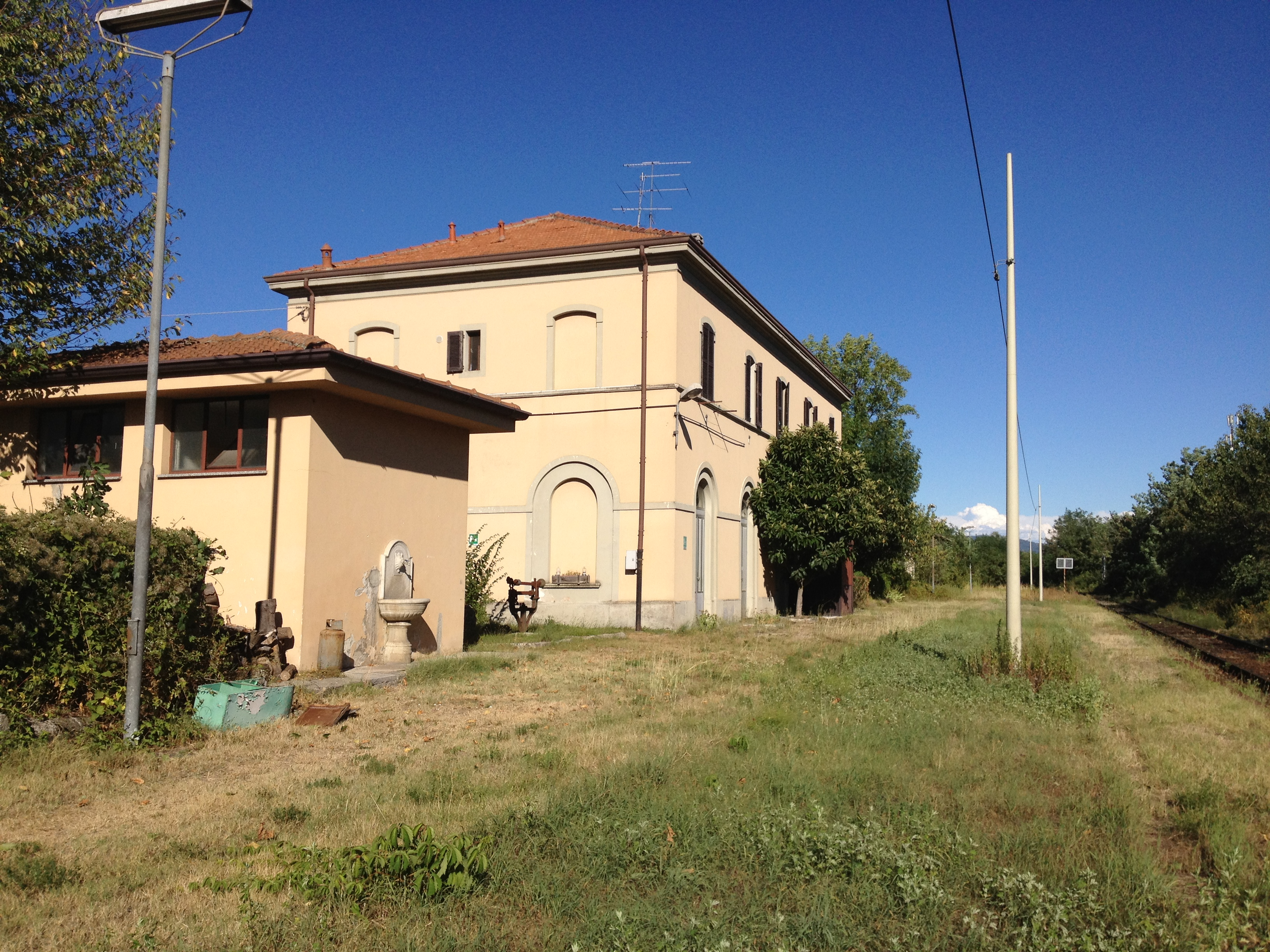
- Anzano station in 2012

- Location of Anzano del Parco in Italy Anzano del Parco (Lombardy)
- Coordinates: 45°46′N 9°12′E
- Country: Italy
- Region: Lombardy
- Province: Como (CO)

Government
  - Mayor: Rinaldo Meroni

Area
  - Total: 3.25 km^{2} (1.25 sq mi)
- Elevation: 320 m (1,050 ft)

Population (31 March 2017)
  - Total: 1,792
  - Density: 551/km^{2} (1,430/sq mi)
- Demonym: Anzanesi
- Time zone: UTC+1 (CET)
  - Summer (DST): UTC+2 (CEST)
- Postal code: 22040
- Dialing code: 031
- Website: Official website

Anzano del Parco (Brianzöö: Anzan) is a comune (municipality) in the Province of Como in the Italian region Lombardy, located about 35 kilometres (22 mi) north of Milan and about 11 kilometres (7 mi) southeast of Como.

Anzano del Parco borders the following municipalities: Alserio, Alzate Brianza, Lurago d'Erba, Monguzzo, Orsenigo.
