= Inverigo =

Inverigo Inverigh (Lombard)
- Comune
- Comune di Inverigo
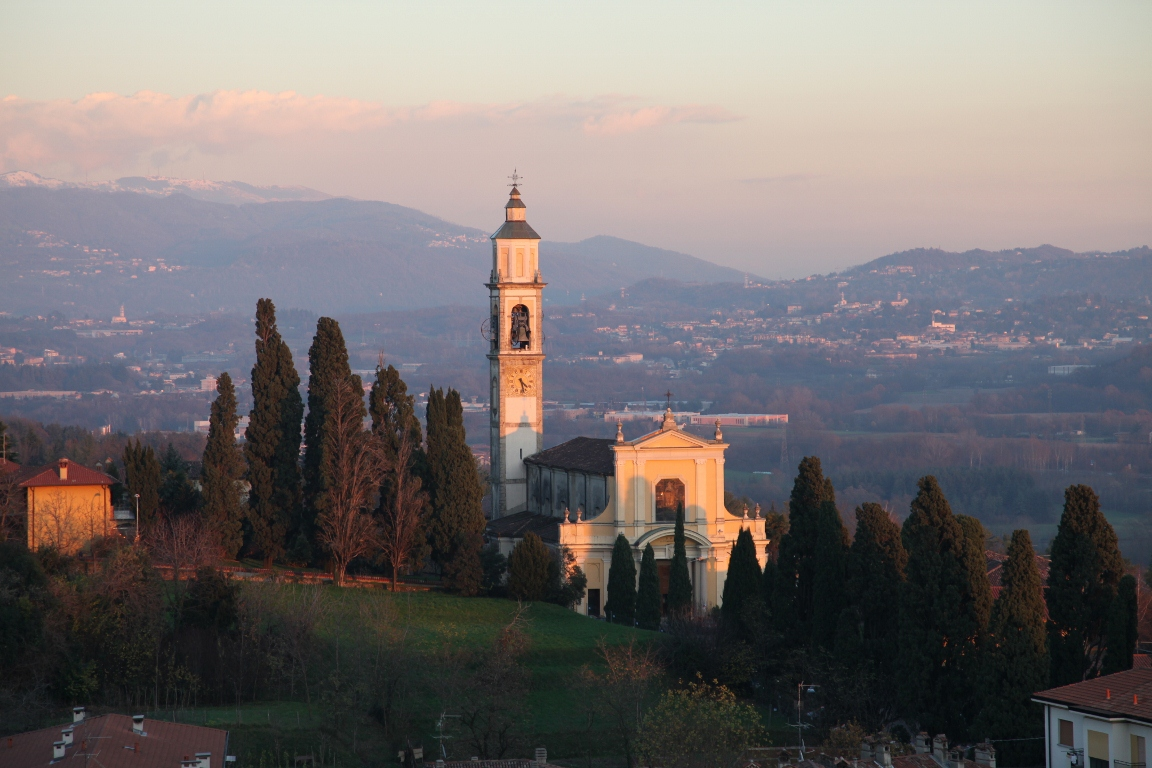

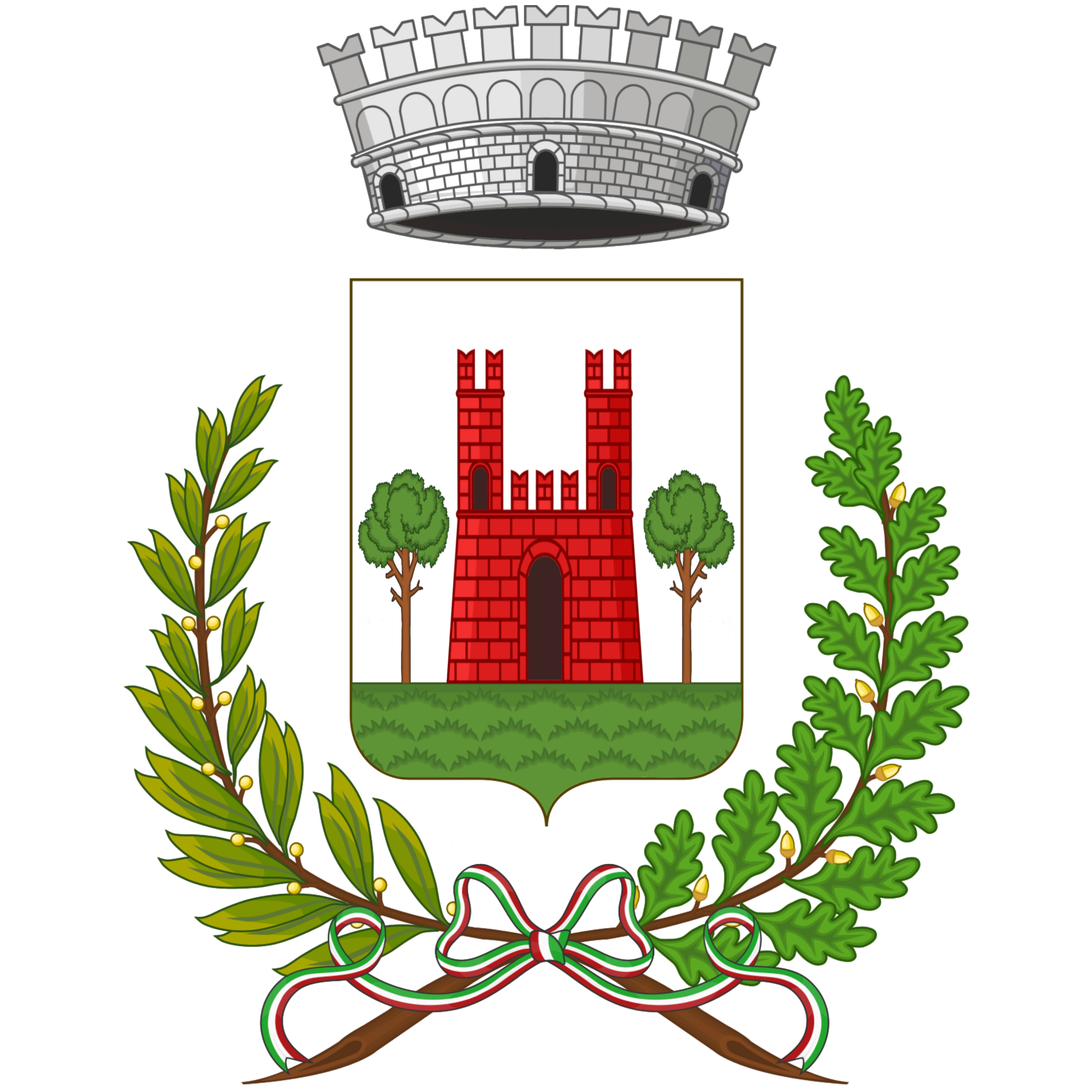
- Coat of arms

- Location within Italy Location within Lombardy
- Coordinates: 45°44′N 9°13′E
- Country: Italy
- Region: Lombardy
- Province: Province of Como (CO)
- Frazioni: Cremnago, Villa Romanò, Romanò

Area
  - Total: 10.0 km^{2} (3.9 sq mi)
- Elevation: 232 m (761 ft)

Population (Dec. 2004)
  - Total: 8,209
  - Density: 821/km^{2} (2,130/sq mi)
- Demonym: Inverighesi
- Time zone: UTC+1 (CET)
  - Summer (DST): UTC+2 (CEST)
- Postal code: 22044
- Dialing code: 031
- Patron saint: Saint Ambrose
- Website: http://www.comune.inverigo.co.it/

Inverigo (Brianzöö: Inverigh [ĩʋeˈriːk]) is a comune (municipality) in the Province of Como in the Italian region Lombardy, located about 30 kilometres (19 mi) north of Milan and about 14 kilometres (9 mi) southeast of Como. As of 31 December 2004, it had a population of 8,209 and an area of 10.0 km^{2} (3.9 sq mi).

The municipality of Inverigo contains the frazioni (subdivisions, mainly villages and hamlets) Cremnago, Villa Romanò, and Romanò.

Inverigo borders the following municipalities: Alzate Brianza, Arosio, Brenna, Briosco, Carugo, Giussano, Lambrugo, Lurago d'Erba, Nibionno, Veduggio con Colzano.

Outside the town is the eclectic structure of Villa La Rotonda.

== Demographic evolution ==
Historical population

Year	Pop.	±%
1861	3,285	—
1871	3,459	+5.3%
1881	3,711	+7.3%
1901	4,127	+11.2%
1911	4,552	+10.3%

Year	Pop.	±%
1921	4,671	+2.6%
1931	4,550	−2.6%
1936	4,552	+0.0%
1951	5,269	+15.8%
1961	5,917	+12.3%

Year	Pop.	±%
1971	6,957	+17.6%
1981	7,512	+8.0%
1991	7,733	+2.9%
2001	7,825	+1.2%

Source: Data from ISTAT
