= Erba, Lombardy =

Erba
- Comune
- Città di Erba
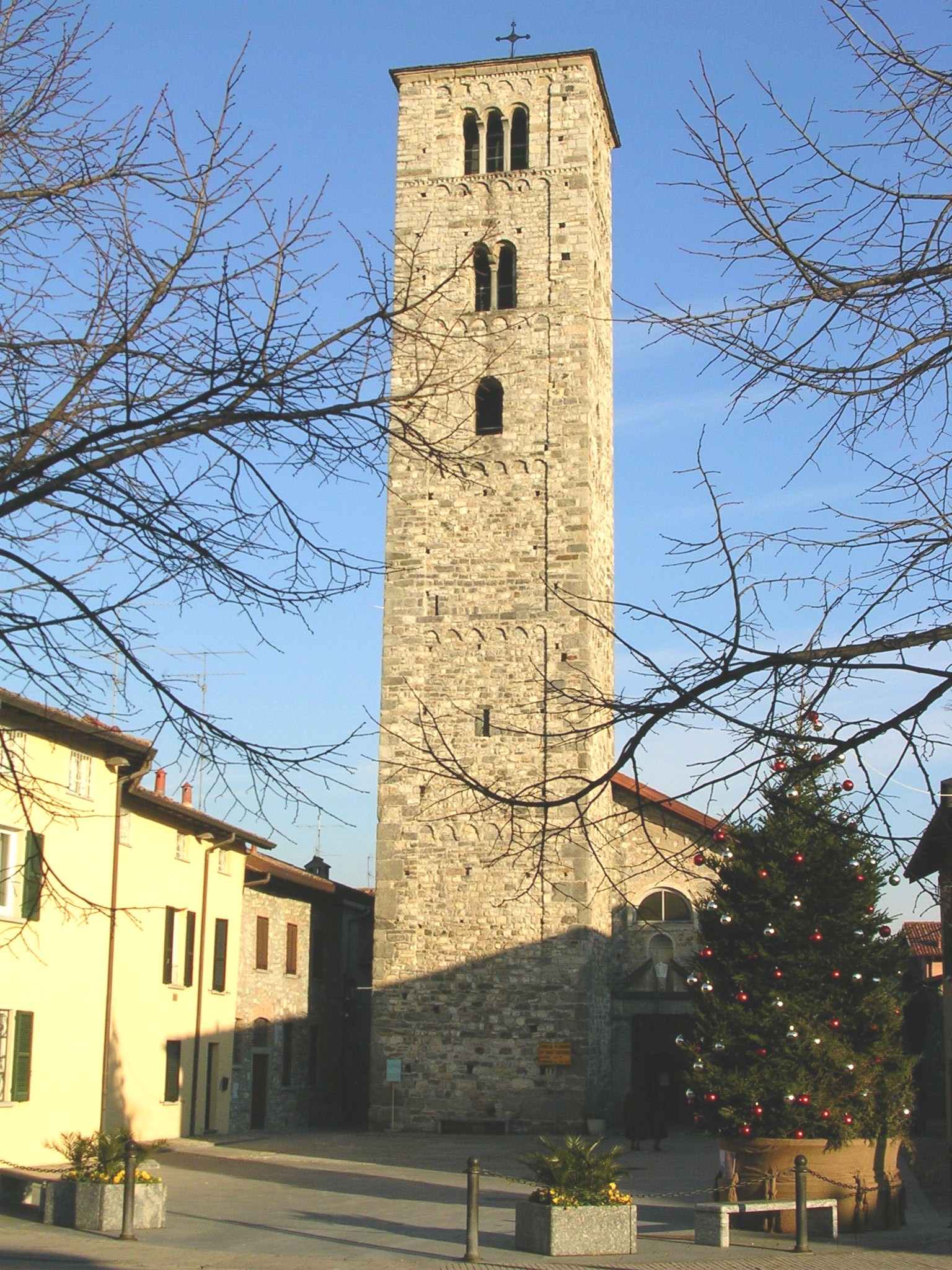

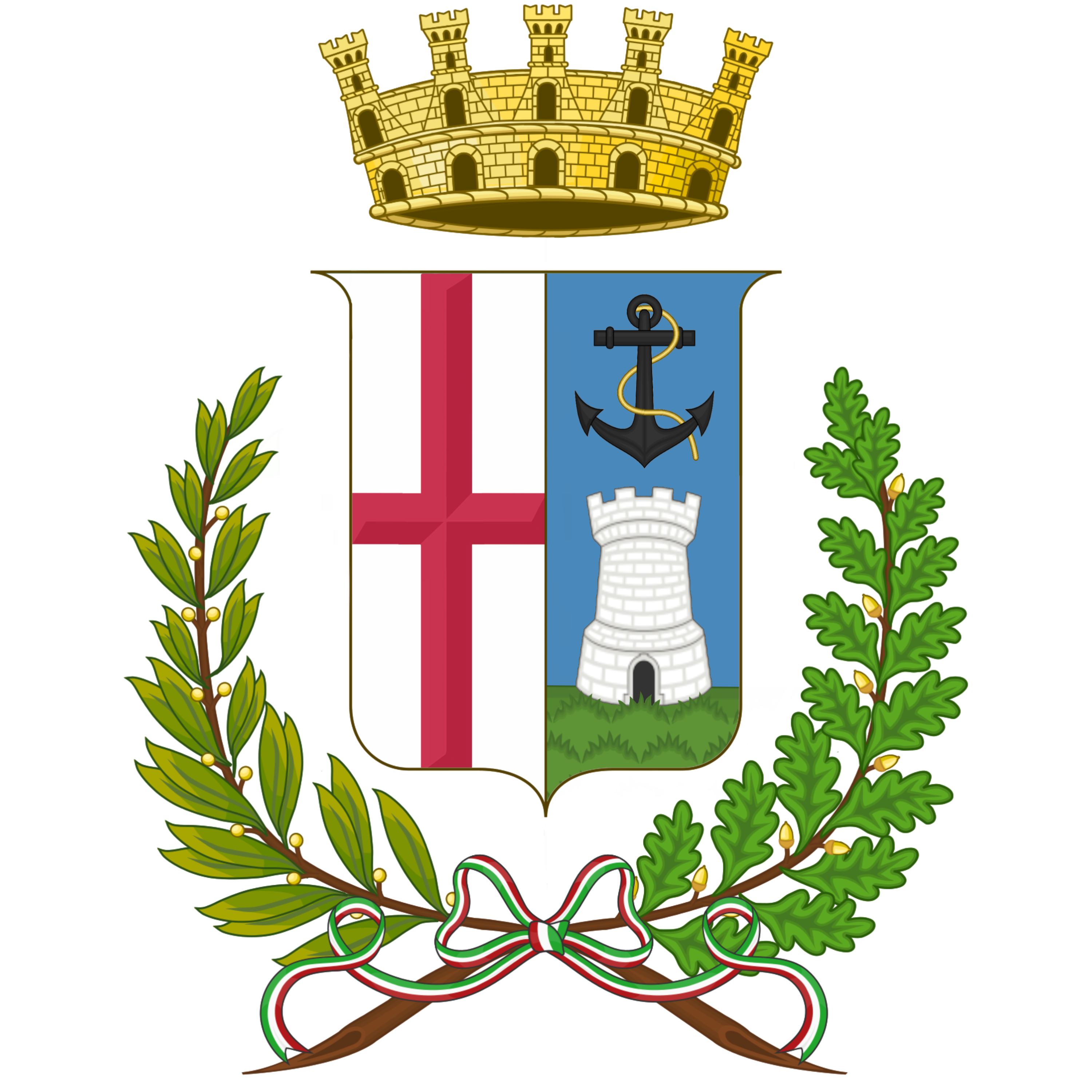
- Coat of arms

- Location within Italy Location within Lombardy
- Coordinates: 45°49′N 9°13′E
- Country: Italy
- Region: Lombardy
- Province: Como (CO)
- Frazioni: Arcellasco, Bindella, Campolongo, Incasate

Government
  - Mayor: Veronica Airoldi

Area
  - Total: 23.80 km^{2} (9.19 sq mi)
- Elevation: 320 m (1,050 ft)

Population (31 March 2017)
  - Total: 16,365
  - Density: 687.6/km^{2} (1,781/sq mi)
- Demonym: Erbesi
- Time zone: UTC+1 (CET)
  - Summer (DST): UTC+2 (CEST)
- Postal code: 22036
- Dialing code: 031
- Patron saint: Birth of Virgin Mary
- Website: Official website

Erba (previously Erba-Incino, as it was formed by the union of these two places, together with some smaller districts) is a comune (municipality) of some 16,000 inhabitants in the Province of Como in the Italian region Lombardy. It is located 40 kilometres (25 mi) north of Milan and about 10 kilometres (6 mi) east of Como in the traditional region of Brianza at the foot of the Lombard Prealps and close to Monte Bollettone.

It received the honorary title of city with a presidential decree on May 12, 1970. Erba borders the following municipalities: Albavilla, Caslino d'Erba, Castelmarte, Eupilio, Faggeto Lario, Longone al Segrino, Merone, Monguzzo, Ponte Lambro, Proserpio.

== Massacre of Erba ==
Erba was the site of the murder of four people including a 2-year old baby in December 2006, an event known as the massacre of Erba. A married couple, the victims' neighbors, were arrested for the murders.

== Main sights ==
- Romanesque church of Sant'Eufemia, with the 11th-century bell tower.
- Monument to World War I Victims, by Giuseppe Terragni (c. 1930)
- Torre di Incino, with remains of a medieval castle.
- Natural grotto of the Buco del Piombo.

== People ==
- Giuseppe Terragni (1904–1943), an architect and pioneer of the Italian modern movement who also designed Como's Casa del Fascio, a significant example of Fascist architecture in northern Italy.
- Sissi (singer) (born 1999), singer-songwriter

== Twin towns ==
- Fellbach, Germany
- Tain-l'Hermitage, France
- Tournon-sur-Rhône, France
- Cortale, Italy
