= Cremera =

Italian stream connecting to the Tiber

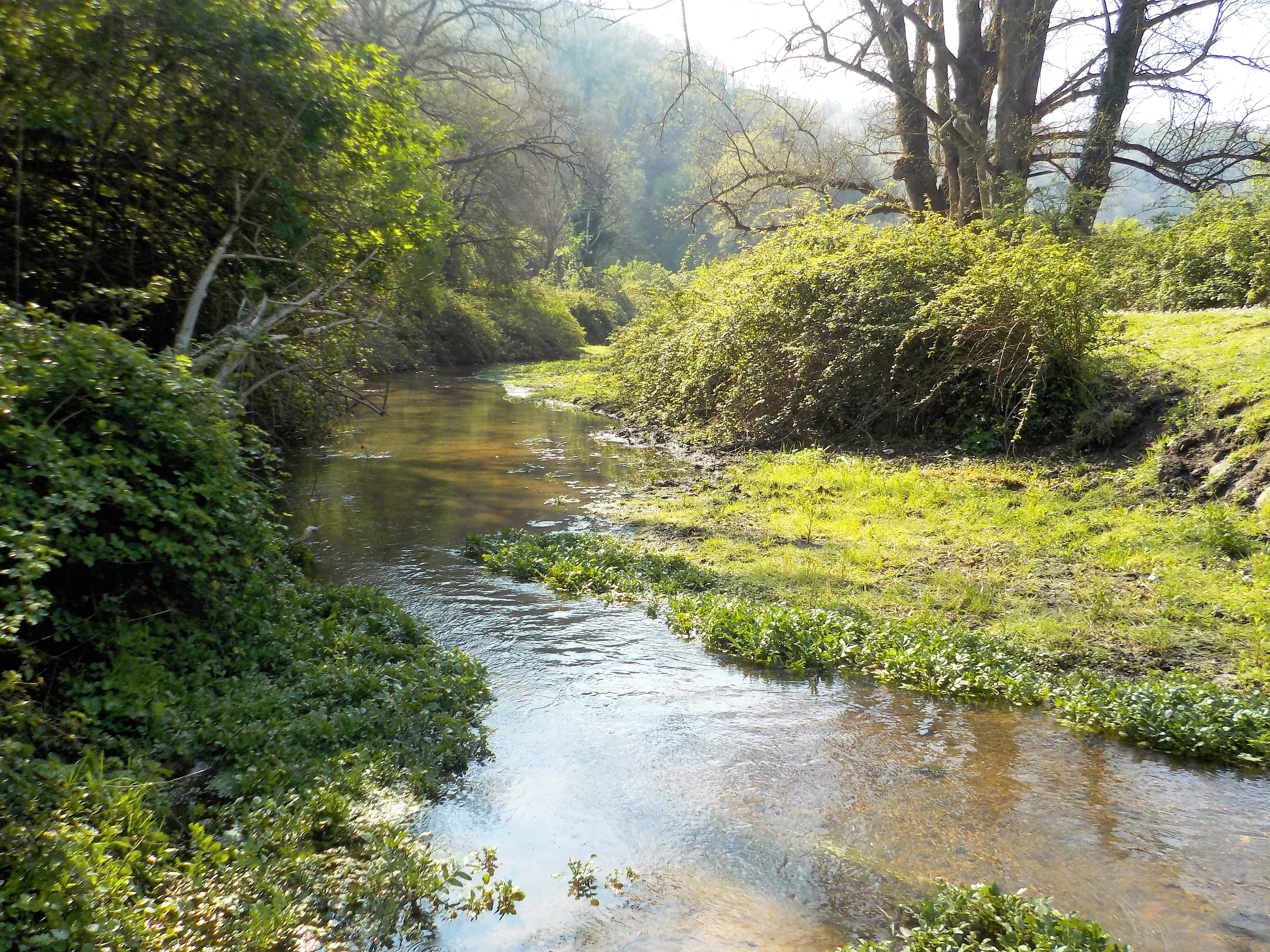

Location
- Country: Italy

Physical characteristics
- Source
  - location: Monte Silio
- Mouth: Tiber
  - location: Labaro
  - coordinates: 41°59′14″N 12°29′52″E
- Length: 36.7 km (22.8 mi)
- Basin size: 103 km^{2} (40 sq mi)
- Discharge
  - average: about 5 m^{3}/s (180 cu ft/s)

Basin features
- Progression: Tiber→ Tyrrhenian Sea

The Cremera is a 36.7-kilometre (22.8 mi) Italian stream in Lazio (and previously in Etruria) which runs past Sacrofano, Formello, and Campagnano di Roma before falling into the Tiber about 10 kilometres (6 mi) north of Rome. It connects to the Tiber just as the Via Flaminia intersects the Grande Raccordo Anulare highway, on the proximity of the Labaro Roma Nord railway station, where there is an ancient Roman bridge. The identification with the Fosso della Valchetta is fixed as correct by the account in Livy ii. 49, which shows that the Saxa Rubra were not far off, and this we know to be the Roman name of the post station of Prima Porta, about 12 kilometres (7 mi) from Rome on the Via Flaminia. It is famous for the defeat of the three hundred Fabii, who had established a fortified post on its banks.
