= Albavilla =

- Comune
- Comune di Albavilla
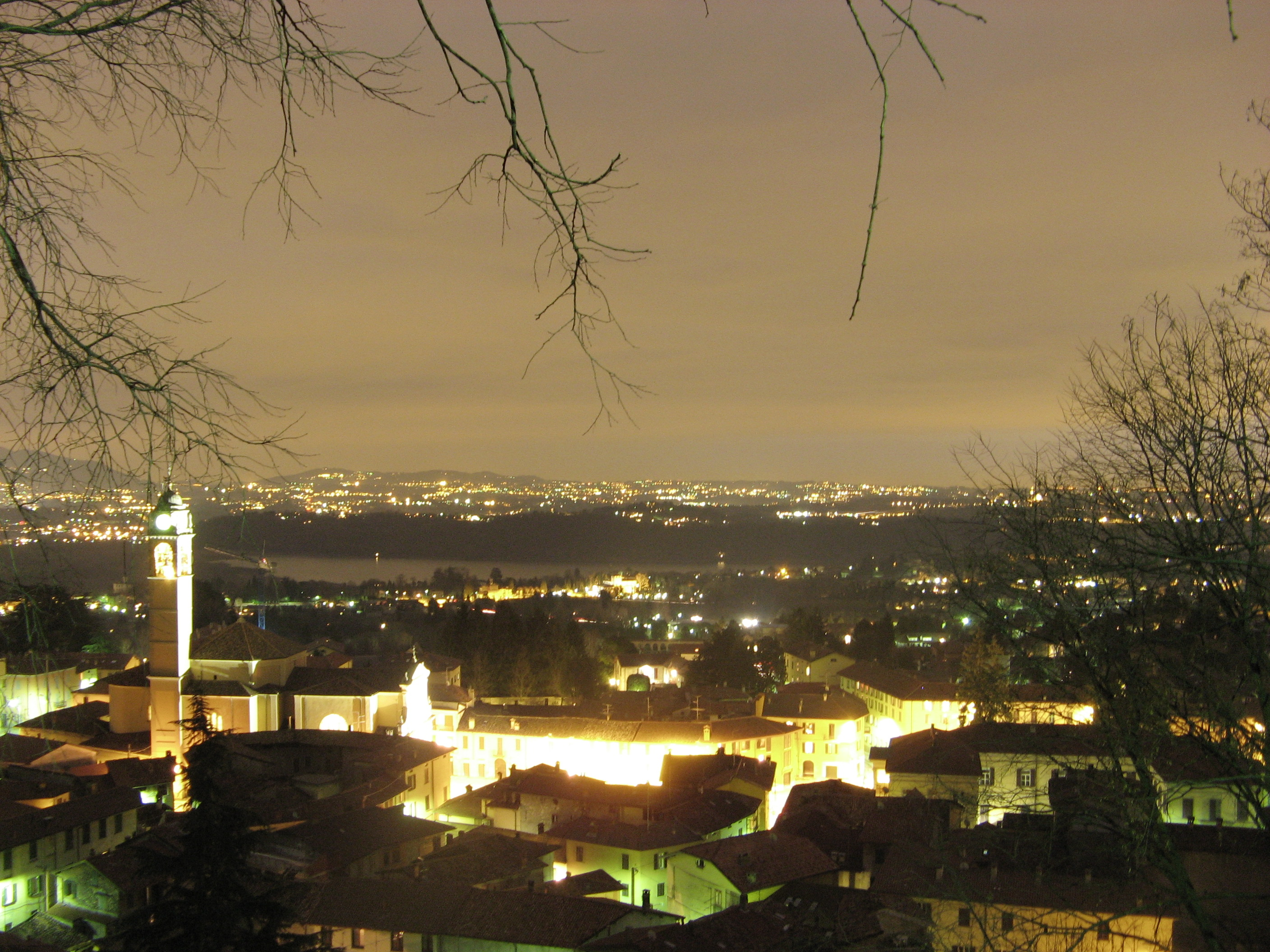
- View of Albavilla

- Coat of arms

- Location within Italy Location within Lombardy
- Coordinates: 45°48′N 9°11′E
- Country: Italy
- Region: Lombardy
- Province: Como (CO)
- Frazioni: Carcano, Corogna, Vill'Albese, Molena, Saruggia

Government
  - Mayor: Giuliana Castelnuovo

Area
  - Total: 10.6 km^{2} (4.1 sq mi)
- Elevation: 427 m (1,401 ft)

Population (Dec. 2004)
  - Total: 6,070
  - Density: 573/km^{2} (1,480/sq mi)
- Demonym: Albavillesi
- Time zone: UTC+1 (CET)
  - Summer (DST): UTC+2 (CEST)
- Postal code: 22031
- Dialing code: 031
- Website: Official website

Albavilla (Brianzöö: Vila) is a comune (municipality) in the Province of Como in the Italian region Lombardy, located about 35 kilometres (22 mi) north of Milan and about 8 kilometres (5 mi) east of Como.

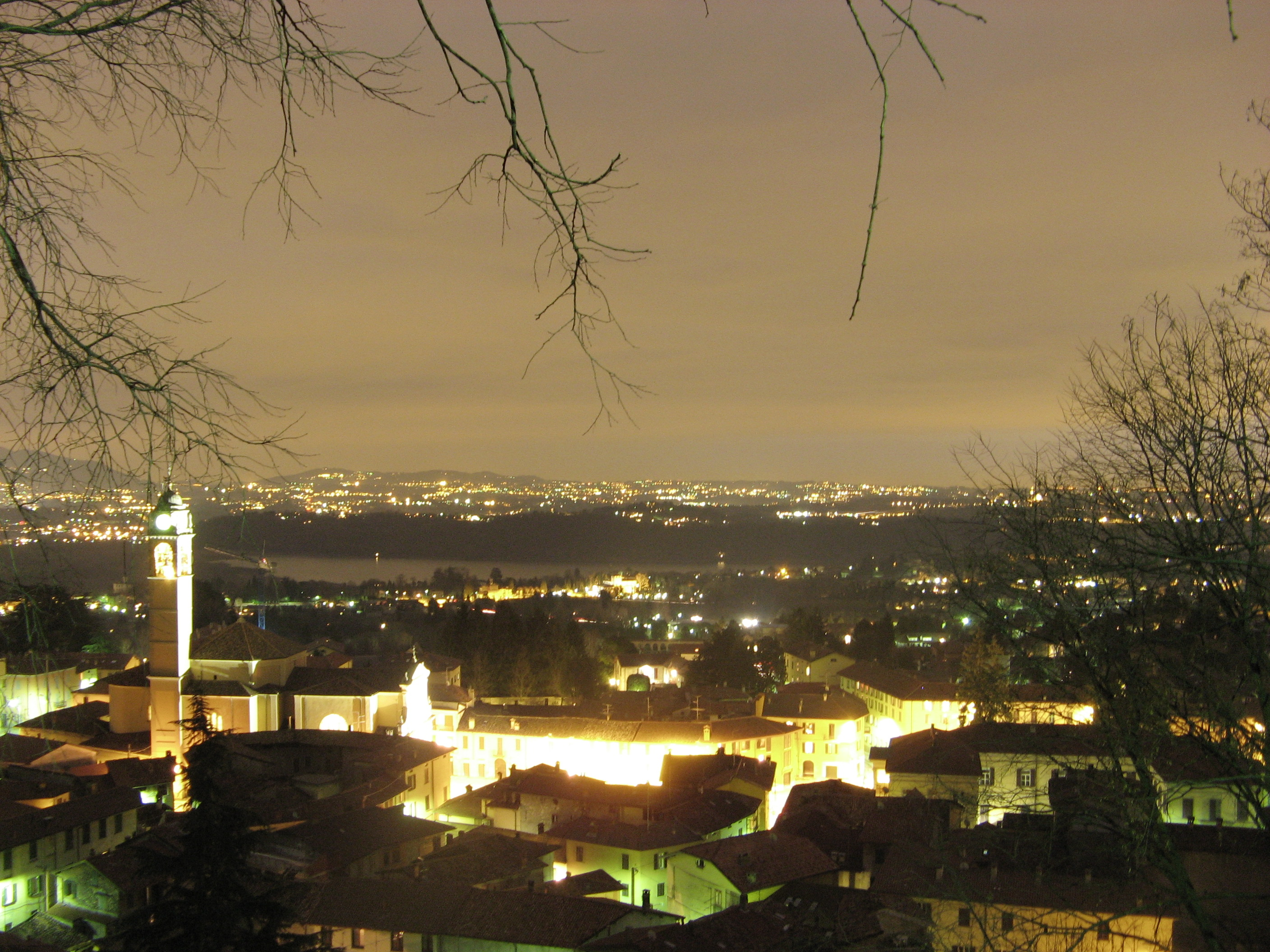
Albavilla at night

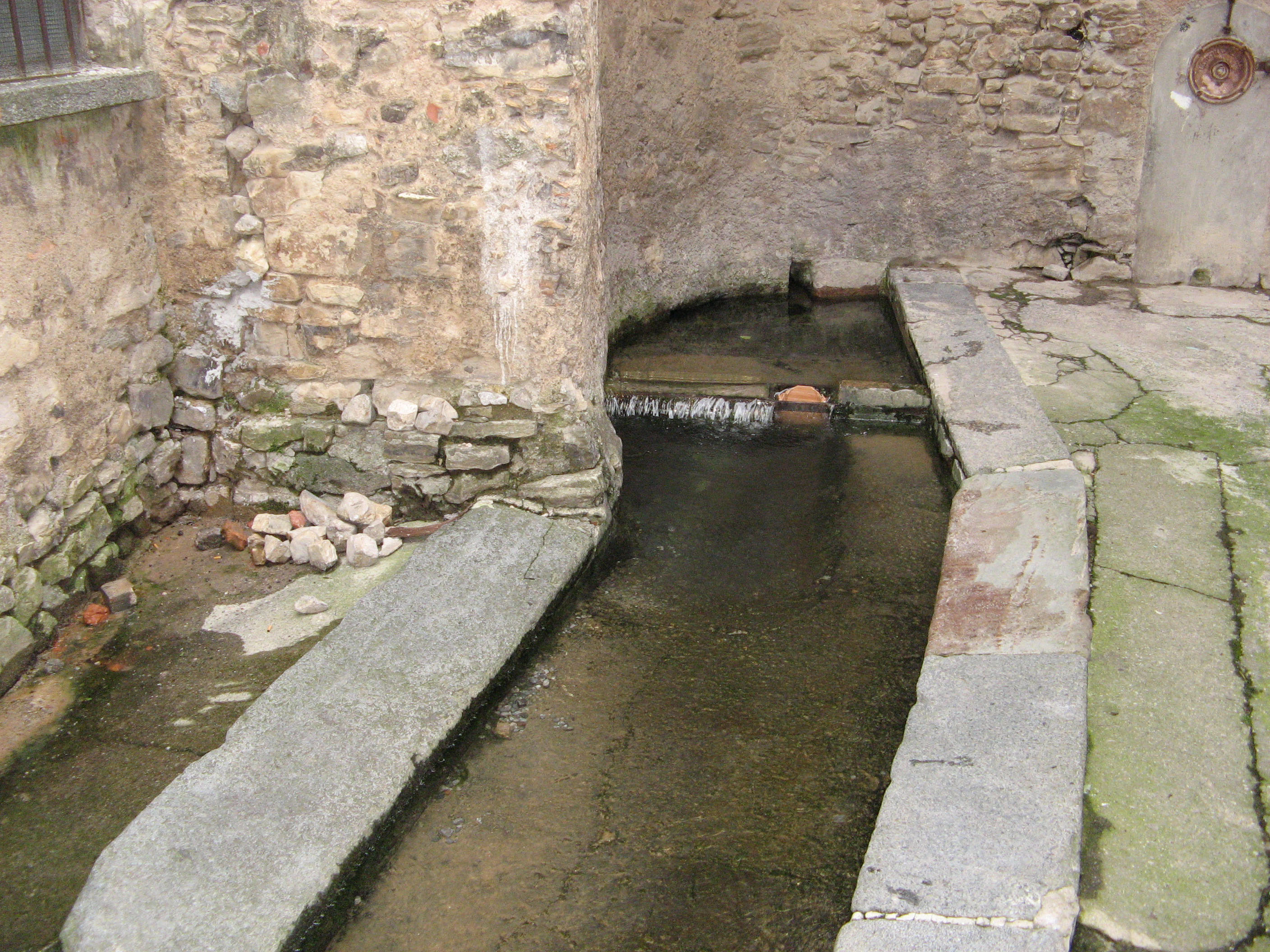
Old washtub located in the historic center of Albavilla
