= Vallassinese dialect =

Western Lombard dialect of Italy

Vallassinese
- Native to: Italy
- Language family: Indo-European: Italic; Latino-Faliscan; Romance; Italo-Western; Western Romance; Gallo-Romance; Gallo-Italic; Lombard–Piedmontese?; Lombard; Western Lombard; Comasco-Lecchese; Vallassinese

Language codes
- ISO 639-3: –
- Glottolog: None

Vallassinese is variety of the Western Lombard language spoken in the Vallassina valley of Italy (about 6,000 speakers). It belongs to the Comasco-Lecchese group and it has many subdialects.

Asso subdialect resembles to Canzés (Brianzoeu group), but it has some characteristics from Valbrona dialect.

Valbrona subdialect has influences from Lecchese (Comasco-Lecchese group)

In Sormano, Caglio, Rezzago there are influences from dialect of Pian del Tivano (north), which has isolated characteristics (like the presence of ò instead of stressed a in all closed syllables, phenomenon that you can sometimes see in Northern Brianzoeu but only in syllables closed by l) and from Laghée.

In Lasnigo, Barni, Magreglio and Civenna there are influences from Laghée.
