= Oliveto Lario =

- Comune
- Comune di Oliveto Lario
- Coat of arms

- Location of Oliveto Lario in Italy Oliveto Lario (Lombardy)
- Coordinates: 45°57′N 9°16′E
- Country: Italy
- Region: Lombardy
- Province: Lecco (LC)

Government
  - Mayor: Polti Bruno

Area
  - Total: 16.1 km^{2} (6.2 sq mi)
- Elevation: 208 m (682 ft)

Population (31 December 2005)
  - Total: 1,164
  - Density: 72.3/km^{2} (187/sq mi)
- Time zone: UTC+1 (CET)
  - Summer (DST): UTC+2 (CEST)
- Postal code: 23865
- Dialing code: 031
- Website: Official website

Oliveto Lario (Lecchese: Ulivee) is a comune (municipality) in the Province of Lecco in the Italian region Lombardy, located about 50 kilometres (31 mi) north of Milan and about 15 kilometres (9 mi) northwest of Lecco.

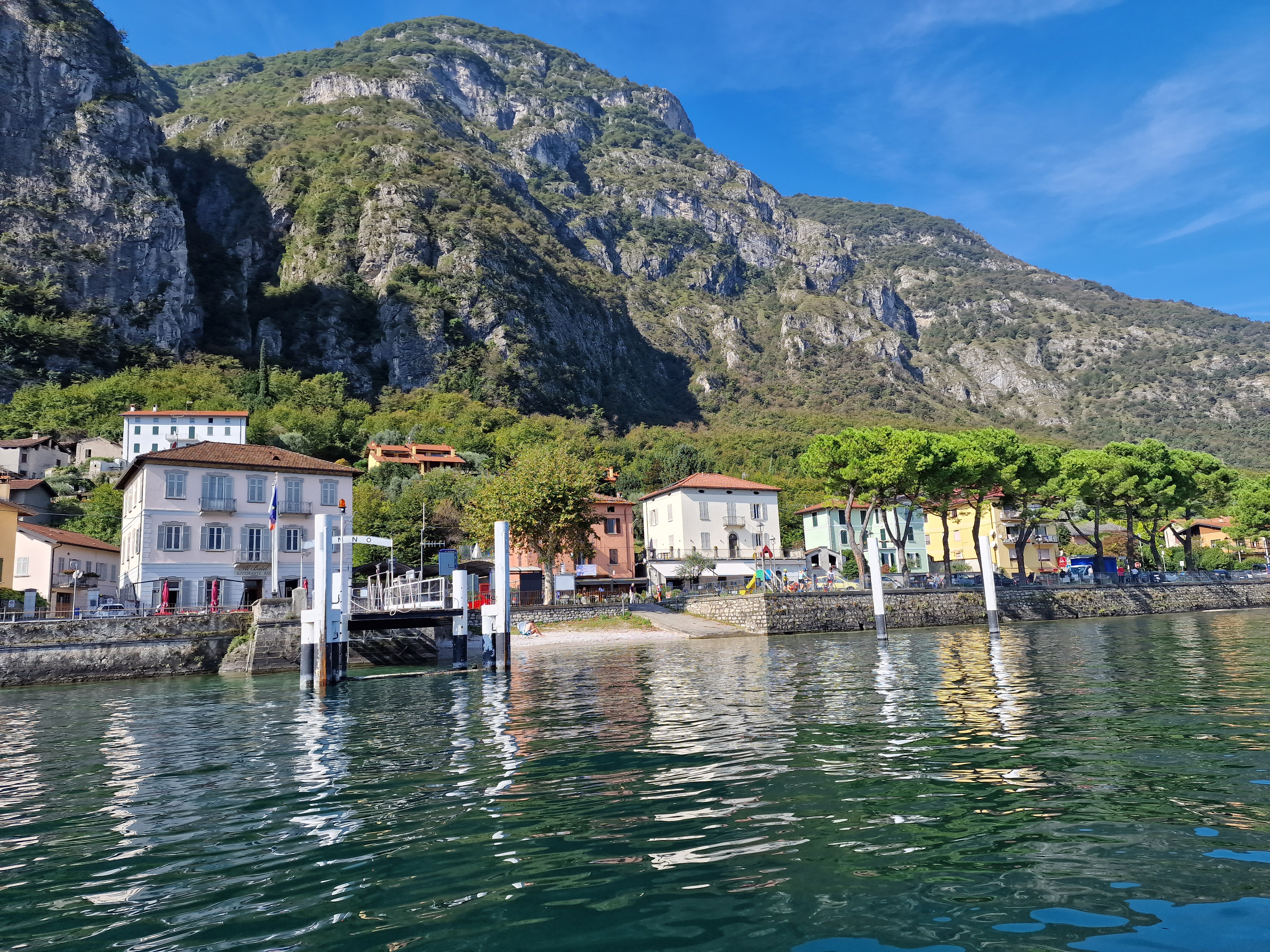

Oliveto Lario consists of three hamlets: Onno, Vassena and Limonta.

Oliveto Lario borders the following municipalities: Abbadia Lariana, Barni, Bellagio, Civenna, Lasnigo, Lierna, Magreglio, Mandello del Lario, Valbrona, Varenna.

== Twin towns ==
Oliveto Lario is twinned with:

- Friedberg, Hesse, Germany
