= Corni di Canzo =

Mountain in Italy

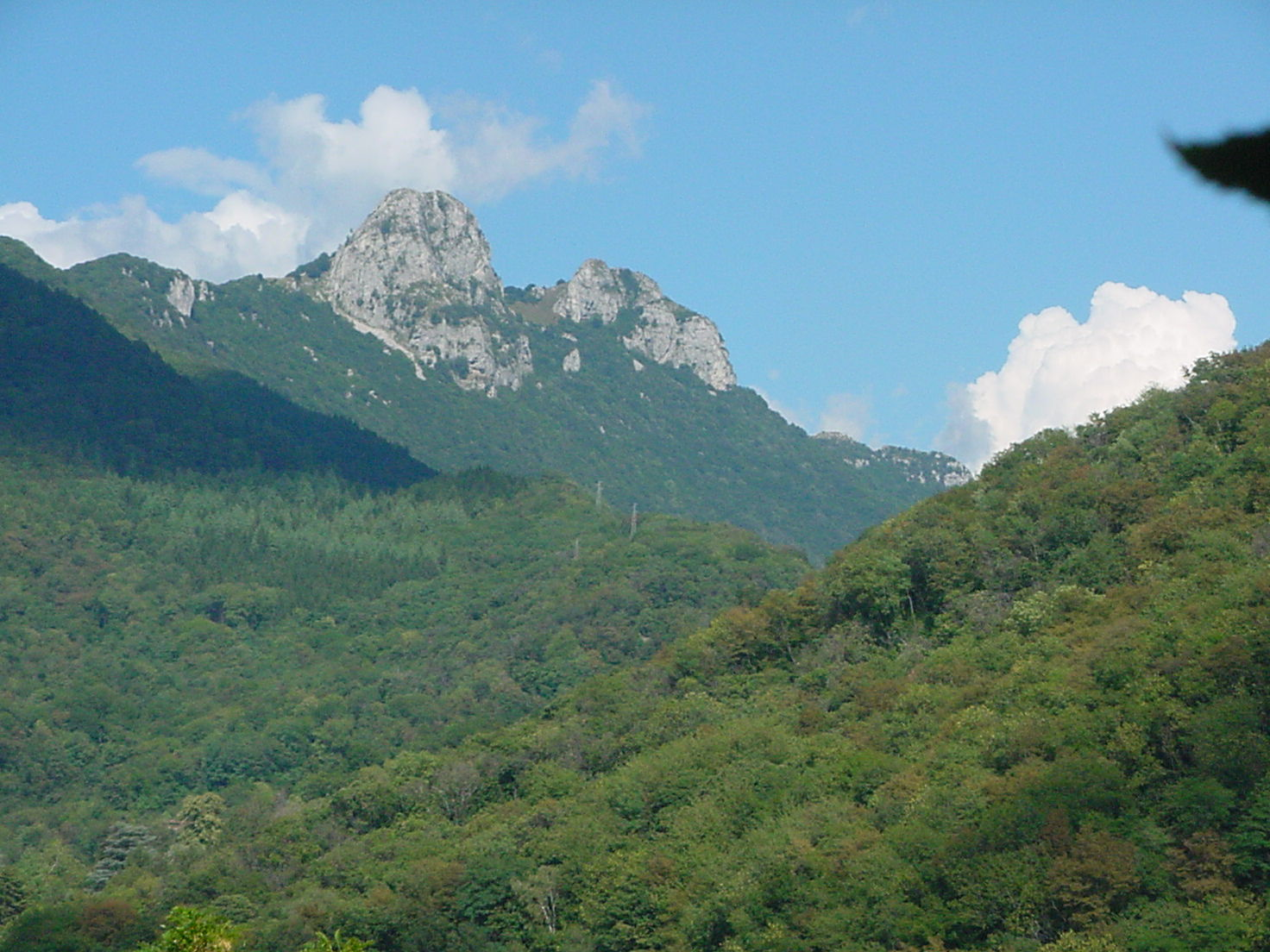
- Panoramic view of Corni di Canzo mounts

Highest point
- Elevation: 1,373 m (4,505 ft)
- Prominence: 875 m (2,871 ft)
- Coordinates: 45°51′44″N 9°19′41″E

Naming
- English translation: Canzo's Horns
- Language of name: Italian

Geography
- Location within Italy
- Location: Lombardy, Italy
- Parent range: Lugano Prealps

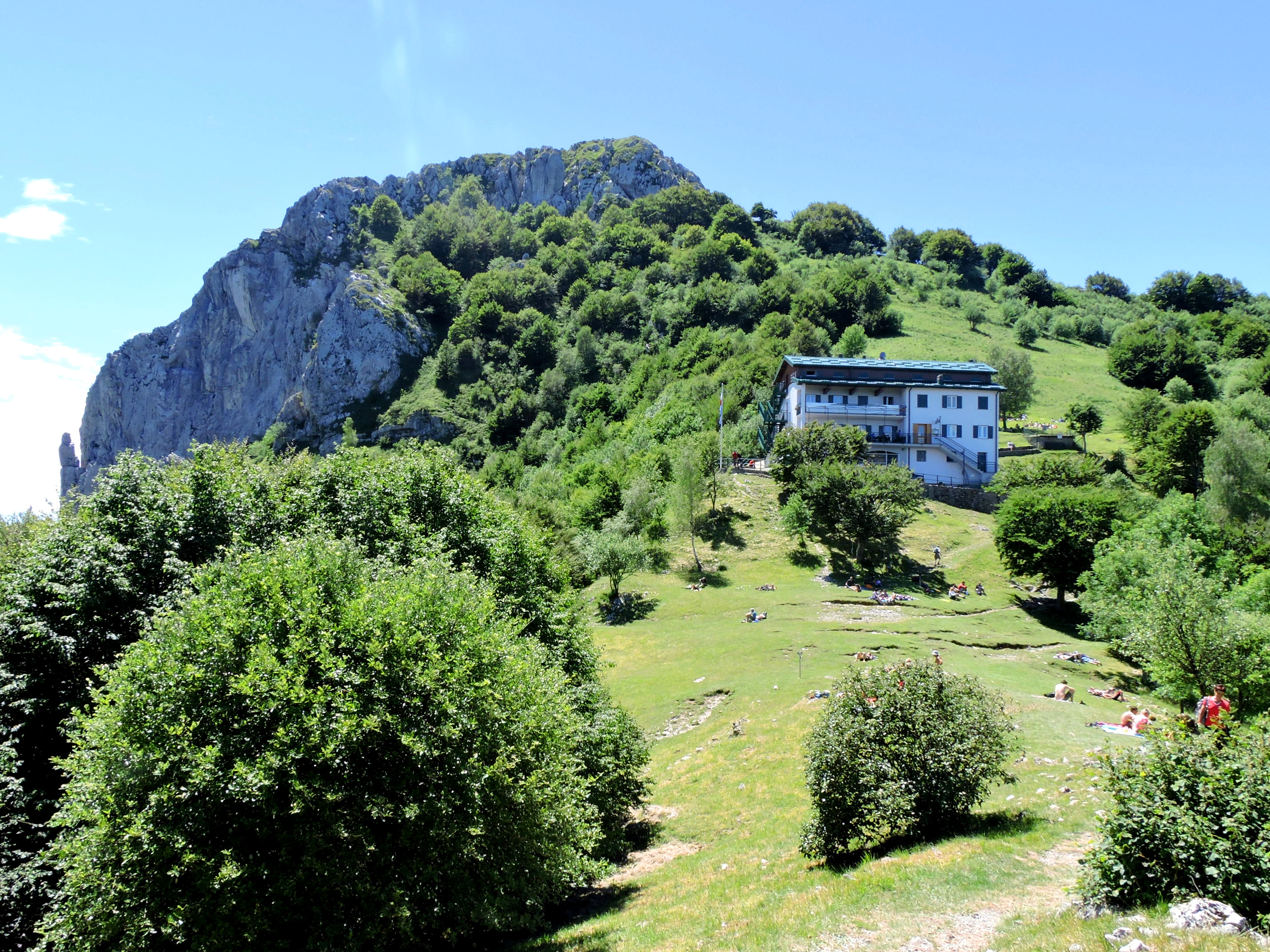
Corni di Canzo and rifugio S.E.V.

The Corni di Canzo (en: Canzo's Horns), (also known as Còrni o Curunghèj o Culunghèj in Canzés) are a group of mountains located in the Triangolo lariano (larian triangle), to the south of Lake Como. Administratively they belong to the province of Como.

== Description ==
They are three peaks, from east to west, named after Canzo town, in fact central and western horns edge val Ravella valley and the territory of Canzo and Valbrona town. Only the third peak, the smallest, is in the territory of Valmadrera town. Western horn is 1373 meters high, the central one 1368 meters and the eastern is only 1232 meters.

The two highest peaks are well visible in Brianza and look like horns.

== SOIUSA classification ==
According to the SOIUSA (International Standardized Mountain Subdivision of the Alps) the mountain can be classified in the following way:

- main part = Western Alps
- major sector = North Western Alps
- section = Lugano Prealps
- subsection = Prealpi Comasche
- supergroup = Catena del Triangolo Lariano
- group = Gruppo dei Corni di Canzo
- subgroup = Sottogruppo dei Corni di Canzo
- code = I/B-11.I-C.9.a

== Mountain huts ==
Not far from the mountain are available two mountain huts: Rifugio SEV (Società Escursionisti Valmadreresi), on the northern slopes of the central horn at 1,125 m, and Rifugio Terz'Alpe, located on the way from Canzo to the mountain.
