= Comasco-Lecchese dialects =

Western Lombard dialects of Italy

Comasco-Lecchese
- Native to: Italy
- Native speakers: (undated figure of 300,000)
- Language family: Indo-European: Italic; Latino-Faliscan; Romance; Italo-Western; Western Romance; Gallo-Romance; Gallo-Italic; Lombard–Piedmontese?; Lombard; Western Lombard; Comasco-Lecchese

Language codes
- ISO 639-3: –
- Glottolog: None

The group of dialects Comasco-Lecchese is part of the Western Lombard language and is spoken in the province of Como and province of Lecco in Italy, especially around the capital cities and north of them. In other parts of this provinces, other Western Lombard varieties are spoken (Brianzoeu, Bustocco and Legnanese dialects).

The most important dialects are:

- Comasco dialect (spoken in the city and suburbs of Como)
- Intelvese dialect (spoken in Val d'Intelvi)
- Laghée dialect (spoken on the lake coast north to the city)
- Lecchese dialect (spoken in the city and suburbs of Lecco)
- Vallassinese dialect (spoken in the Vallassìna valley)
- Valsassinese dialect (spoken in the Valsàssina valley)
