= Nesso =

Nesso Ness (Lombard)
- Comune
- Comune di Nesso
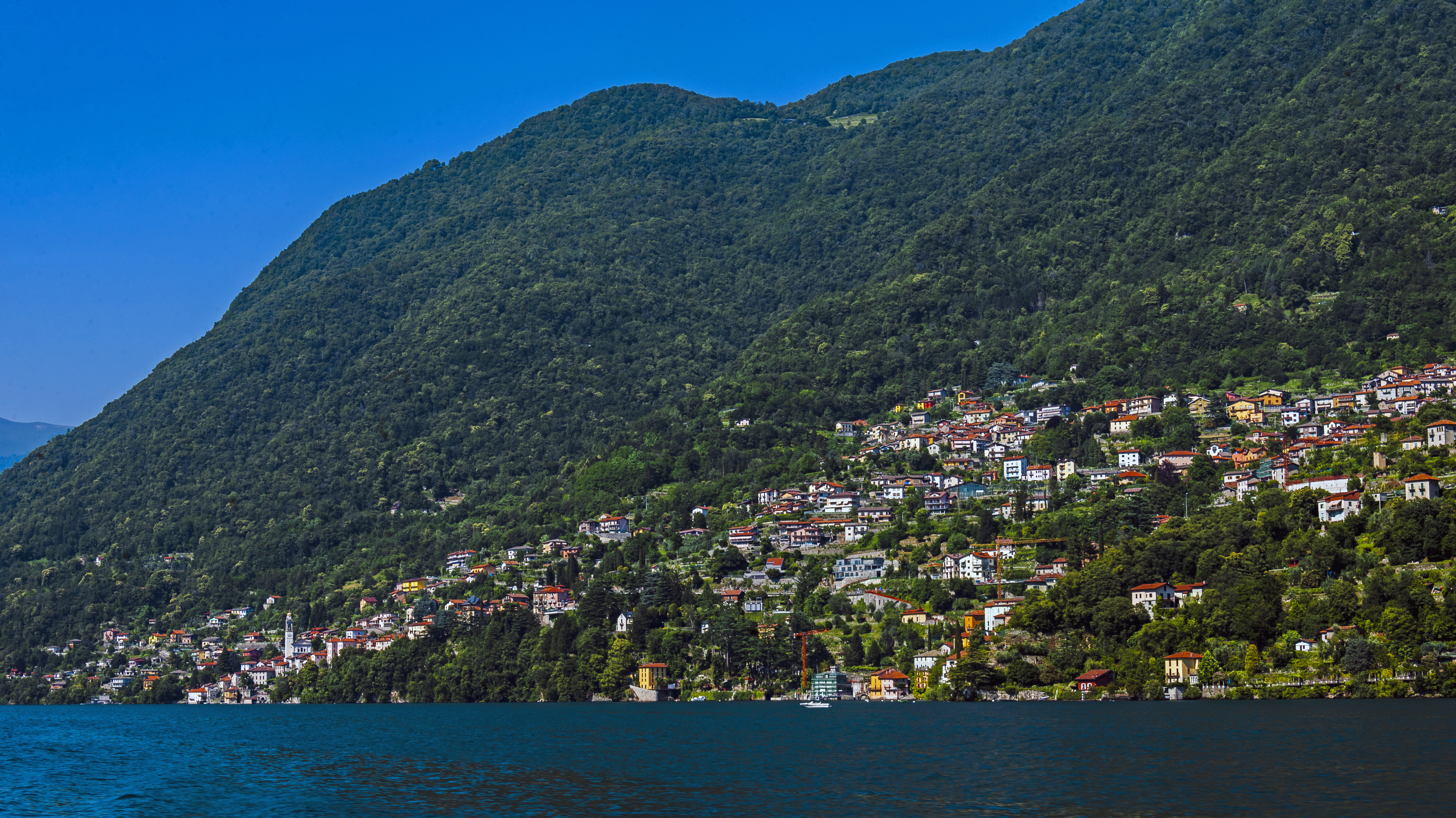
- Nesso from the lake

- Coat of arms

- Location within Italy Location within Lombardy
- Coordinates: 45°55′N 9°10′E
- Country: Italy
- Region: Lombardy
- Province: Province of Como (CO)

Area
  - Total: 15.0 km^{2} (5.8 sq mi)
- Elevation: 300 m (980 ft)

Population (Dec. 2004)
  - Total: 1,294
  - Density: 86.3/km^{2} (223/sq mi)
- Demonym: Nessesi
- Time zone: UTC+1 (CET)
  - Summer (DST): UTC+2 (CEST)
- Postal code: 22020
- Dialing code: 031
- Website: Official website

Orrido di Nesso, from the Civera Bridge

Nesso (Comasco: Ness [ˈnɛs]) is a comune (municipality) in the Province of Como in the Italian region Lombardy, located about 50 kilometres (31 mi) north of Milan and about 13 kilometres (8 mi) northeast of Como. As of 31 December 2004, it had a population of 1,294 and an area of 15.0 km^{2} (5.8 sq mi).

Its toponym is Celtic and means "mooring".

Nesso borders the following municipalities: Argegno, Brienno, Caglio, Faggeto Lario, Laglio, Lezzeno, Pognana Lario, Sormano, Veleso, Zelbio.

== Geography ==
The territory of Nesso extends on the western coast of the Triangolo Lariano, the territory found between the two branches of Lake Como. The village extends from the lake shore, then climbs on the mountain in the direction of Piano del Tivano. The altimetric extension goes from 199 m above sea level of the shore of the lake up to 1,417 m above sea level.

The territory is rich in watercourses. The two most important creeks are the Nosée and Tuf, which flow together to form a spectacular waterfall inside the Nesso gorge.

== Demographic evolution ==
Historical population

Year	Pop.	±%
1861	1,411	—
1871	1,557	+10.3%
1881	1,672	+7.4%
1901	1,671	−0.1%
1911	1,715	+2.6%

Year	Pop.	±%
1921	1,662	−3.1%
1931	1,608	−3.2%
1936	1,611	+0.2%
1951	1,703	+5.7%
1961	1,563	−8.2%

Year	Pop.	±%
1971	1,416	−9.4%
1981	1,374	−3.0%
1991	1,357	−1.2%
2001	1,302	−4.1%

Source: Data from ISTAT
