= Valassina =

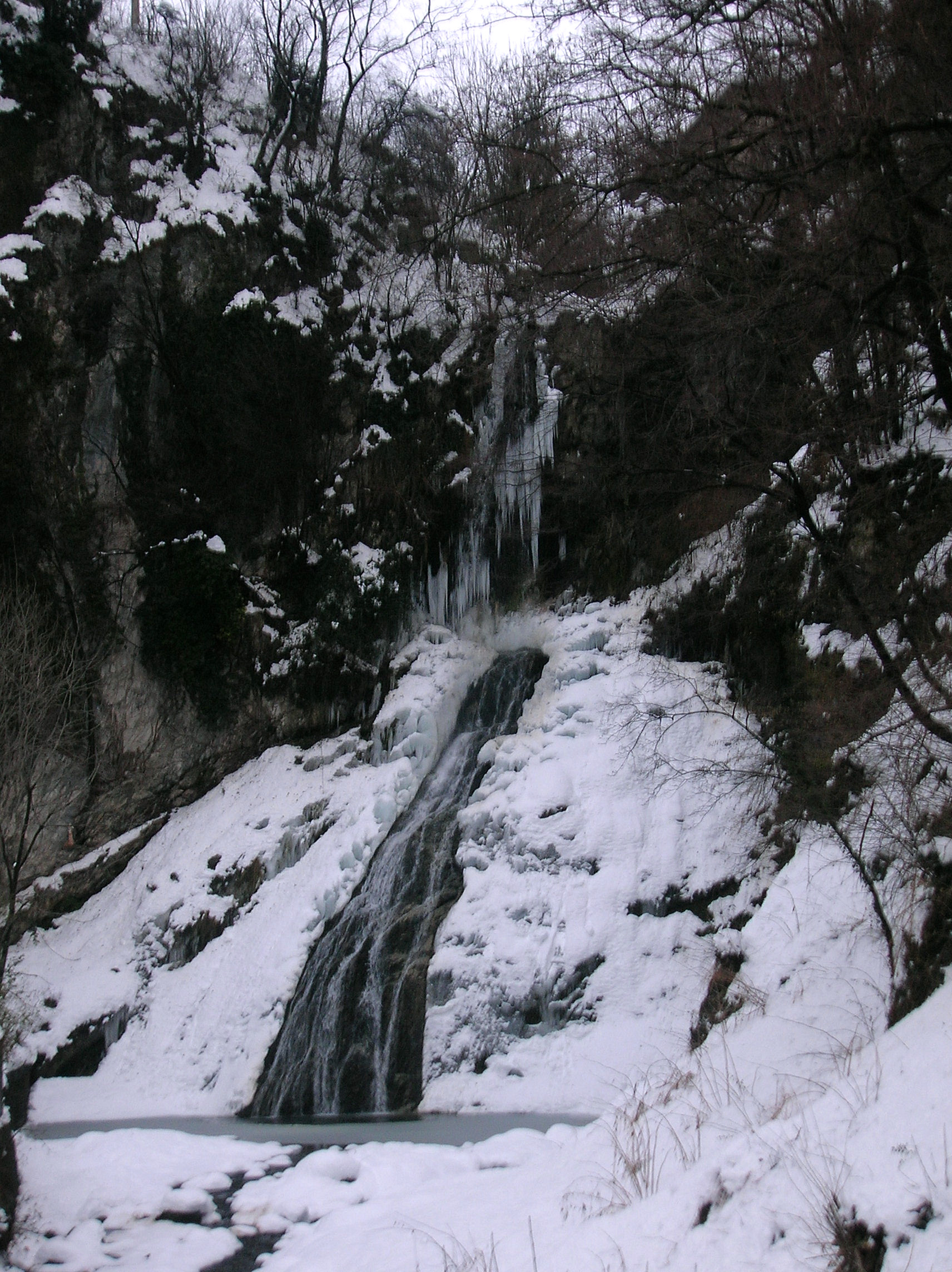
- The Vallategna waterfall

Geography
- Location: Italy, Lombardy, Como
- Population centers: Asso, Barni, Caglio, Civenna, Lasnigo, Magreglio, Rezzago, Sormano, Valbrona
- Interactive map of Valassina

The Valassina or Vallassina is the valley of the upper tract of the river Lambro, situated in the Larian Triangle in the Province of Como, northern Italy. The most important settlement in the area is the town of Asso, from which the valley takes its name. Here the border between Valassina and Brianza is marked by the waterfall known as the Cascata della Vallategna.

Near the end of the valley road which rises from Bellagio is the sanctuary of the Madonna del Ghisallo and its cycling museum.
