= 2012 Giro di Lombardia =

Giro di Lombardia 2012
2012 UCI World Tour, race 27 of 28
- Event poster

Race details
- Dates: 29 September 2012
- Stages: 1
- Distance: 251 km (156.0 mi)
- Winning time: 6h 36' 26"

Results
	Winner	Joaquim Rodríguez (ESP)	(Team Katusha)
	Second	Samuel Sánchez (ESP)	(Euskaltel–Euskadi)
	Third	Rigoberto Urán (COL)	(Team Sky)

The 2012 Giro di Lombardia or 2012 Il Lombardia was the 106th edition of the Giro di Lombardia single-day cycling race, often known as the Race of the Falling Leaves. It was held on 29 September 2012, over a distance of 251 km (156.0 mi), starting in Bergamo and ending in Lecco. It was the penultimate event of the season in the 2012 UCI World Tour. The very steep climb Muro di Sormano returned to the route during the 2012 edition after an absence of fifty years and was situated before the Madonna del Ghisallo climb. Joaquim Rodríguez (Team Katusha) won the race after a solo breakaway initiated on the final climb of the day. He became the first Spaniard to win this Classic.

== Teams ==
As the race was held under the auspices of the UCI World Tour, all eighteen ProTour teams were invited automatically. Seven additional wildcard invitations were given – Acqua & Sapone, Androni Giocattoli–Venezuela, Colnago–CSF Bardiani, Colombia–Coldeportes, Farnese Vini–Selle Italia, Argos–Shimano and Utensilnord–Named – to form the event's 25-team peloton.

- Acqua & Sapone
- Ag2r–La Mondiale
- Androni Giocattoli–Venezuela
- Astana
- Argos–Shimano
- BMC Racing Team
- Colnago–CSF Bardiani
- Colombia–Coldeportes
- Euskaltel–Euskadi
- Farnese Vini–Selle Italia
- FDJ–BigMat
- Garmin–Sharp
- Lampre–ISD
- Liquigas–Cannondale
- Lotto–Belisol
- Omega Pharma–Quick-Step
- Orica–GreenEDGE
- Rabobank
- Saxo Bank–Tinkoff Bank
- Team Katusha
- Movistar Team
- RadioShack–Nissan
- Team Sky
- Utensilnord–Named
- Vacansoleil–DCM

== Race summary ==
The race got underway in Bergamo under rain and fog with temperatures oscillating around 10 °C (50 °F). The weather conditions discouraged a lot of participants, since of the 197 riders who started the race, only 54 crossed the line as 143 competitors withdrew. The newly crowned World champion Philippe Gilbert of BMC Racing Team was among those who abandoned, as he crashed while trying to reel in the leading group on the descent after the Muro di Sormano. He later rated his 60 km/h (37 mph) crash as a "9.5 out of 10" and posted a picture of his bloodied jersey on Twitter.

Romain Bardet (Ag2r–La Mondiale) was the sole survivor of an early breakaway to crest atop the Muro di Sormano in front of the favorites, shaking off Alberto Losada (Team Katusha) near the top. With Bardet still hanging on to a minute lead, Ryder Hesjedal (Garmin–Sharp) attacked with 60 kilometres (37 mi) to go, but the attempt failed. Bardet was caught and Omega Pharma–Quick-Step's Kevin De Weert broke free only to take a spill in a downhill turn. A couple more short-lived breaks ensued, including one by Portuguese Rui Costa (Movistar Team). Joaquim Rodríguez attacked on the final difficulty of the day, the Villa Vergano climb. He arrived at the top of the difficulty alone and descended to Lecco as the rain was pouring down heavily. Nobody could reach him and he crossed the line in joy, throwing a water bottle in the air. Rodriguez stated after the victory: "I was fighting for a double goal today, to win this prestigious competition and to take the lead in the UCI World Tour Ranking, and I managed both. So I'm really happy."

== Results ==
	Cyclist	Team	Time	UCI World Tour Points
1	Joaquim Rodríguez (ESP)	Team Katusha	6h 36' 26"	100
2	Samuel Sánchez (ESP)	Euskaltel–Euskadi	+9"	80
3	Rigoberto Urán (COL)	Team Sky	+9"	70
4	Mauro Santambrogio (ITA)	BMC Racing Team	+9"	60
5	Sergio Henao (COL)	Team Sky	+9"	50
6	Ryder Hesjedal (CAN)	Garmin–Sharp	+9"	40
7	Bauke Mollema (NED)	Rabobank	+9"	30
8	Oliver Zaugg (SWI)	RadioShack–Nissan	+9"	20
9	Alberto Contador (ESP)	Saxo Bank–Tinkoff Bank	+9"	10
10	Fredrik Kessiakoff (SWE)	Astana	+9"	4
