= CAJ =

CAJ may refer to:

- Canaima Airport, Venezuela, IATA code
- Canon, Inc., NYSE symbol
- Air Caraïbes Atlantique, ICAO airline designator
- Canadian Alpine Journal
- Canadian Association of Journalists
- Christian Academy in Japan
- Committee on the Administration of Justice
- Caglio, Lombardy, Italy, local name Caj
