= Triangolo lariano =

Area in Lombardy, Italy

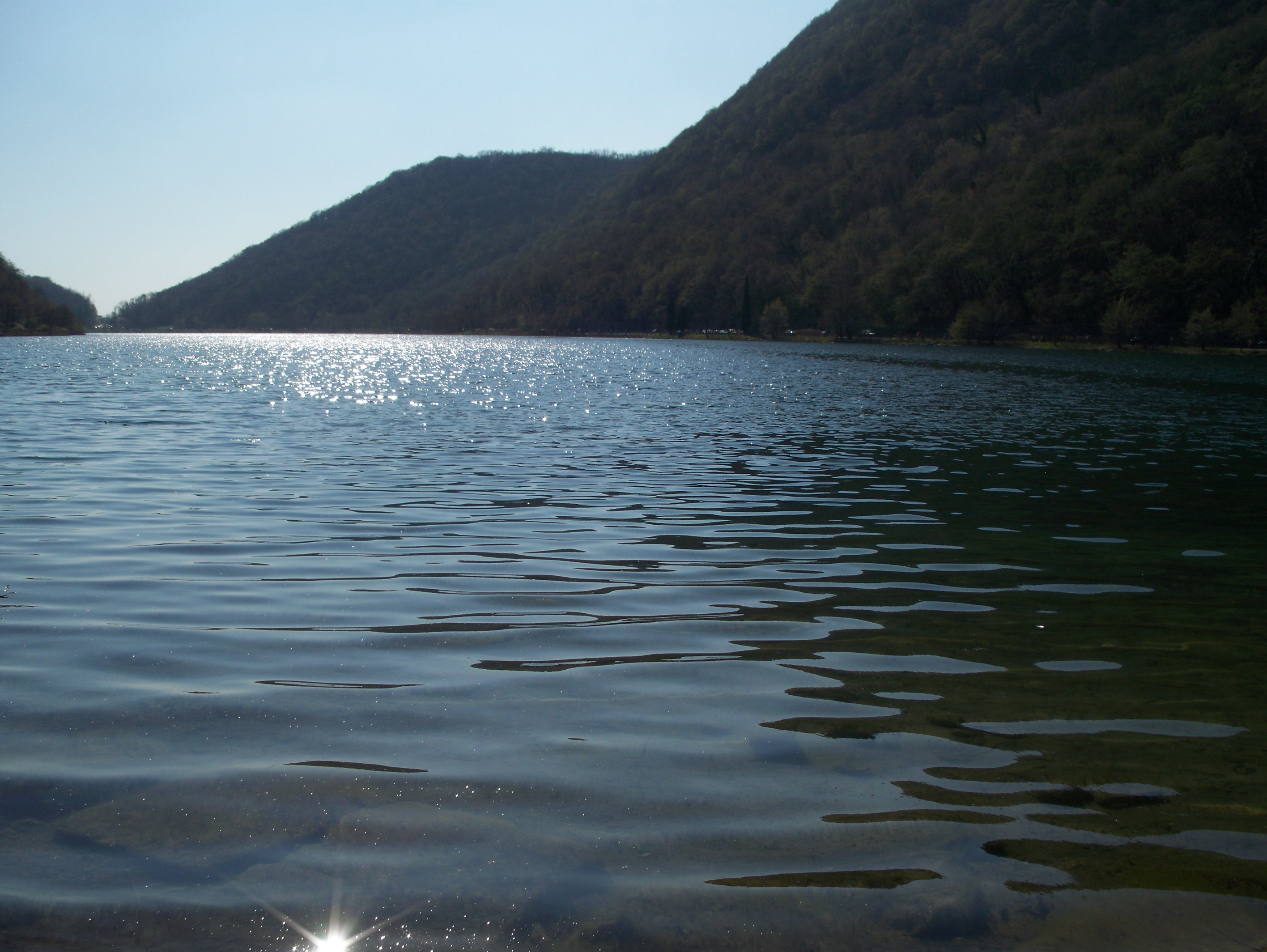
The small Lake Segrino.

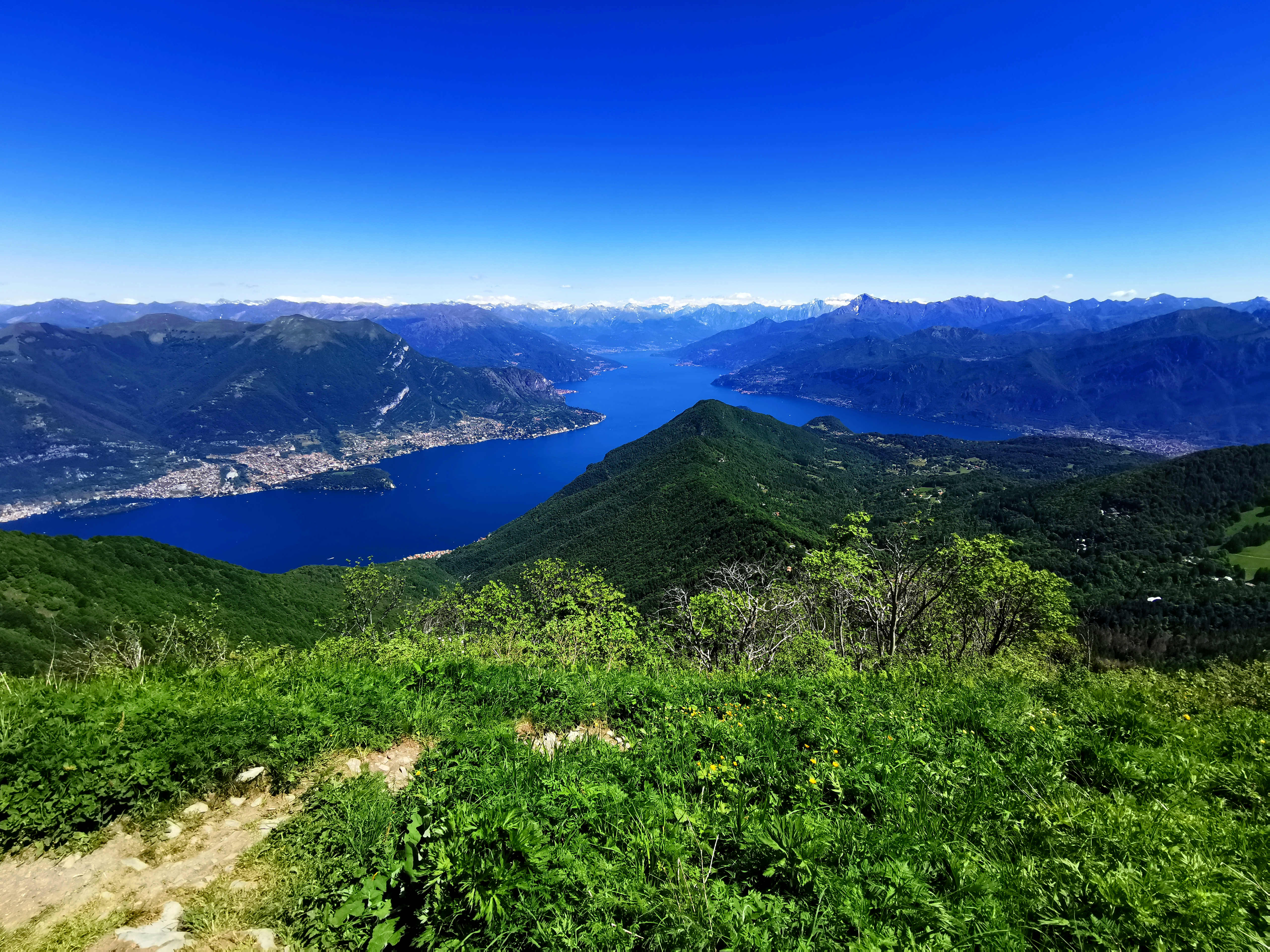
The two branches of Lake Como from Monte San Primo

The Triangolo lariano is a geographic area in Lombardy, Italy within the Province of Como. It is represented by a territorial intermediate institution named Comunità montana del Triangolo lariano, with a base in Canzo.

== Topography ==
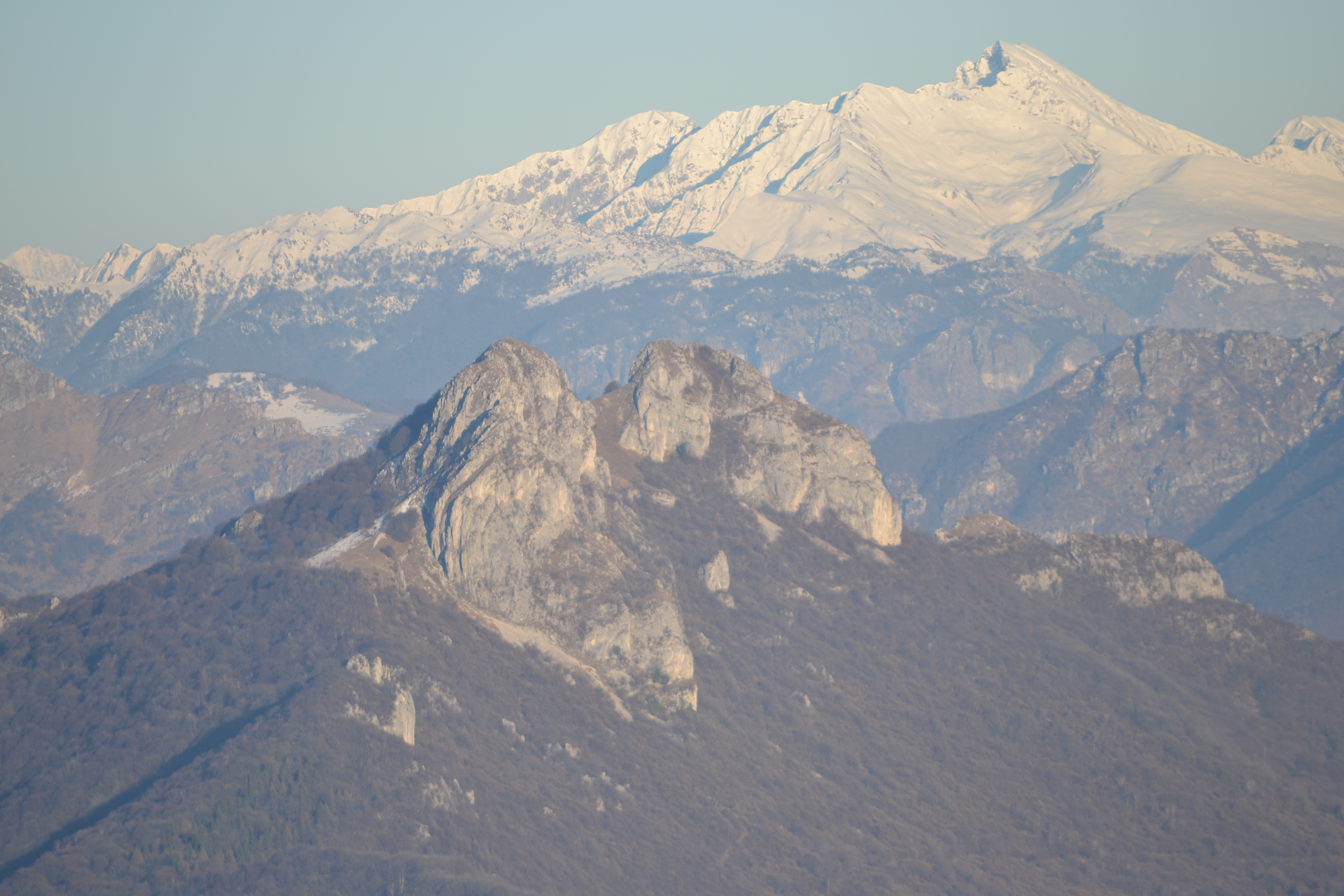
Mounts Corni di Canzo (Canzo's Horns) (in the foreground), with Pizzo dei Tre Signori in the background.

There are three big lakes in Italy which reach a depth of more than 300 metres and cover an area of hundreds of square kilometres. They are aligned west–east, since they all are within the pre-alpine zone of Lombardy region. The westernmost is Lake Maggiore, and it marks the boundary with the region of Piedmont; the easternmost is Lake Garda, marking the boundary with the region of Veneto, and the central one is Lake Como.

It is distinguishable by its characteristic shape of an upside-down "Y" or the Greek letter "λ". The triangle formed by the two diagonal branches of the lake is named in Italian Triangolo lariano. This phrase is composed by the noun triangolo (= triangle) and the adjective lariano, meaning "related to the Larius", the Latin name of Lake Como.

It consists of a peninsula—whose end is the village of Bellagio—but it can be considered as an island, as the third side of the triangle (not occupied by Lake Como) is dotted with seven smaller lakes. The tourist town of Canzo lies at the center of the Triangolo lariano and is the chief town of the Comunità montana del Triangolo lariano (literally, "Mountain community of Triangolo lariano"), a territorial institution who brings together the 31 municipalities of the peninsula, of about 71,000 inhabitants.

== History ==
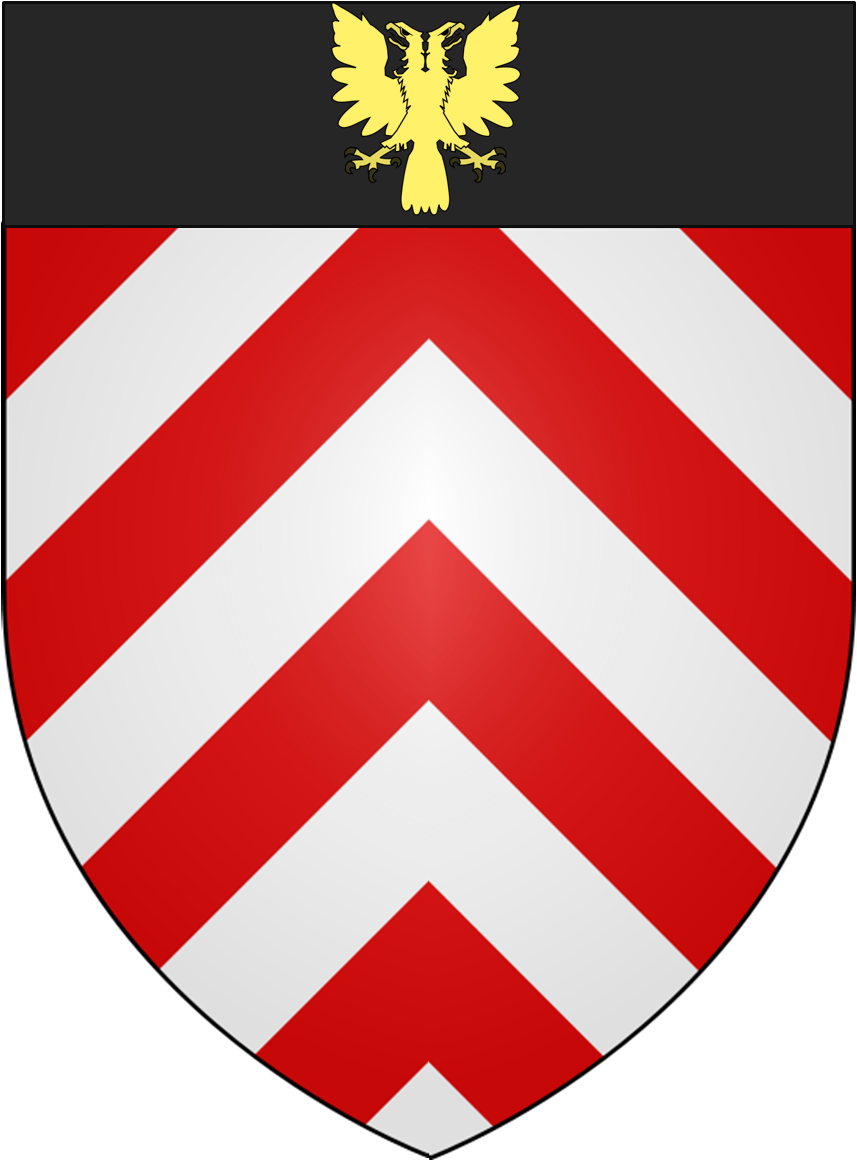
Coat-of-arms of the Duchy of Milan and Coat-of-arms of Curtis Casalensis (Middle Ages institutions).

During the Middle Ages, the territory of Triangolo lariano was divided into four main institutions, three of which were part of the State of Milan; one, instead, was under the rule of the Commune of Como:

- One was the Pieve of Asso (Valassina valley) of the Archdiocese of Milan and, then, also of the Duchy of Milan.
- Another one was the Curtis Casalensis, a league of free communes with Canzo as chief town, within the jurisdiction of the Duchy of Milan too.
- Part of the former Pieve of Incino (= Erba), Duchy of Milan.
- Finally, communes who were under the rule of Como (Bellagio itself, and the villages on the western coast of the Lake).

== Lakes and mountains ==
The "Triangle" has an altitude between 320 and 1,682 meters above sea level. The most famous mountains are: Corni di Canzo (Canzo's Horns) (1,372 m) and Mount Cornizzolo (1,241 m), both in Canzo, divided by Mount Raj (1,261 m), also in Canzo, as a tourist destination because of the variety and attractiveness of the landscape; Mount San Primo (1,682 m) and Mount Palanzone (1,436 m) for their height. Mount Bollettone (1,317 m) too, for its proximity to Como, is often visited.

The seven small lakes forming the southern border of the region are: Lake of Pusiano, Lake of Annone (divided into Lake of Annone strictly said and Lake of Oggiono), Lake of Garlate, Lake of Alserio, Lake of Montorfano, and, finally, the Lake Segrino—placed in the southern border of the land of Canzo—a little glacial lake, celebrated by several authors and poets.

Triangolo lariano is also the name of a Special Protection Area (593 hectares) protected by European laws, located in the Corni di Canzo (Horns of Canzo). Its protection concerns 84 precious bird species (including the honey buzzard, the peregrine falcon, the rock partridge, the eagle owl, the nightjar, the tawny pipit, the red-backed shrike, and the ortolan bunting) and the habitats, e.g. the natural dry grasslands and scrubland facies on calcareous substrates (Festuco-Brometalia) —– with significant blossoming of orchids—the limestone pavements and the petrifying springs with tufa formation (Cratoneurion), and the calcareous beech forests of Central Europe Cephalanthero-Fagion. Inside is another nature reserve, the Site of Community Importance "Sasso Malascarpa" (328 hectares), with 52 protected species, among which are the greater horseshoe bat, various kinds of backed shrike, and the rare white-clawed crayfish. A peculiar habitat of the reserve consists in the stone springs with travertine formation. The alternation of woods, meadows–pastures, and rock formations in the mountains of Canzo, makes the landscape particularly popular for tourism.

== Gallery ==
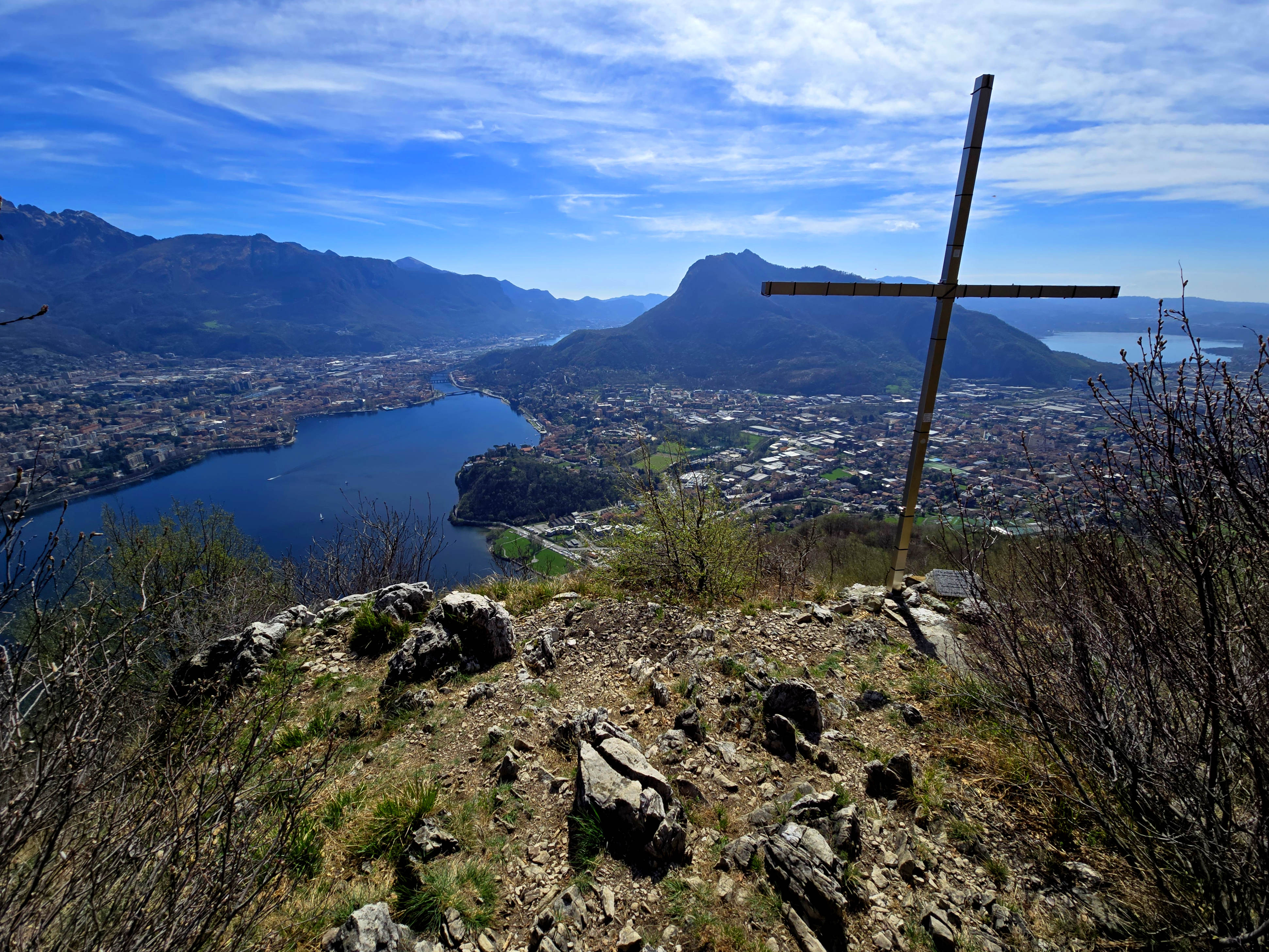
Valmadrera: View from Sasso di Preguda, with Como Lake on the left, Lake of Annone on the right

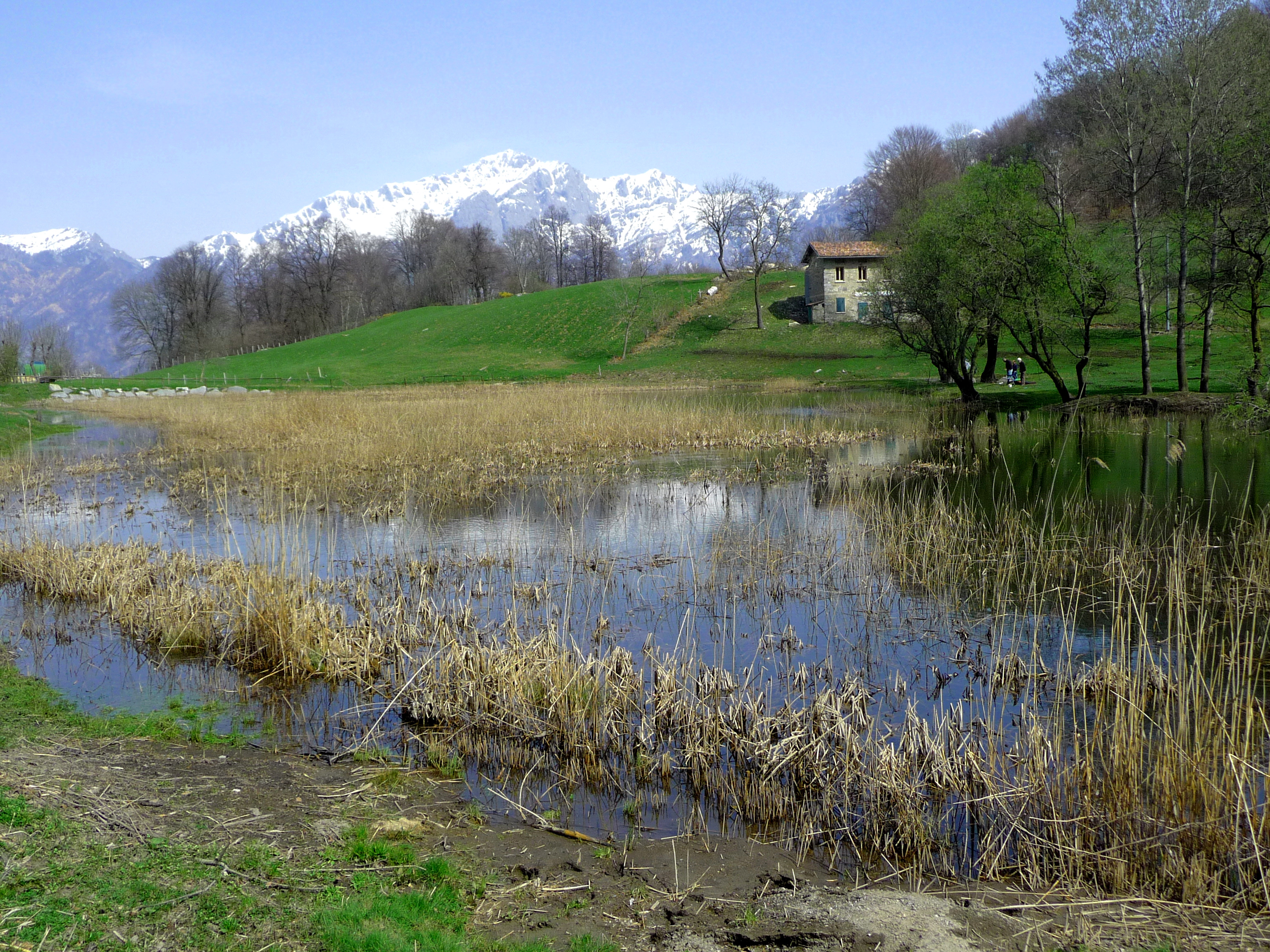
Lasnigo: small lake Crezzo in Conca di Crezzo locality

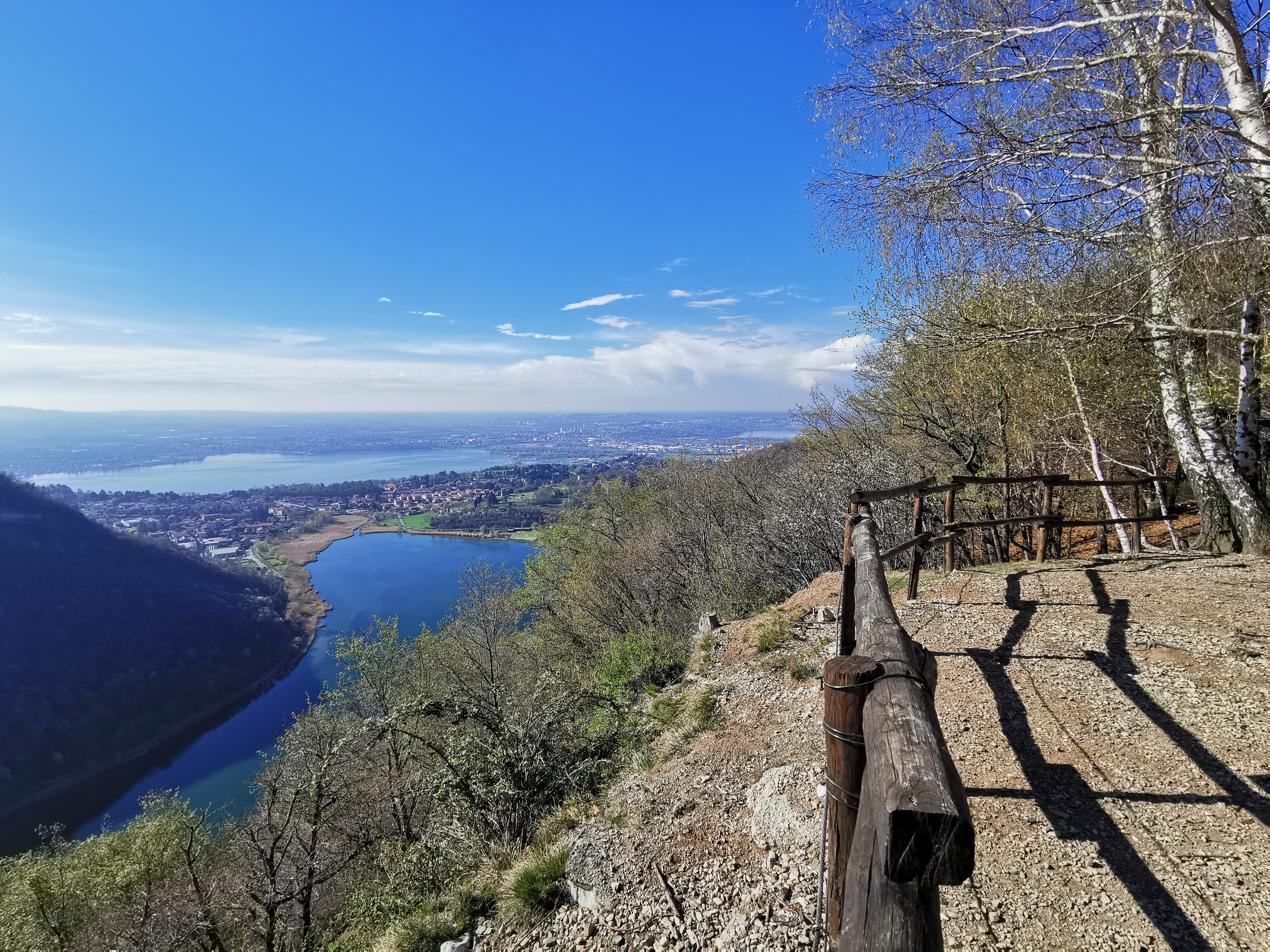
Canzo: Lake Segrino seen from Monte Scioscia, with in background the two lakes of Pusiano (on the left) and Alserio (on the right)

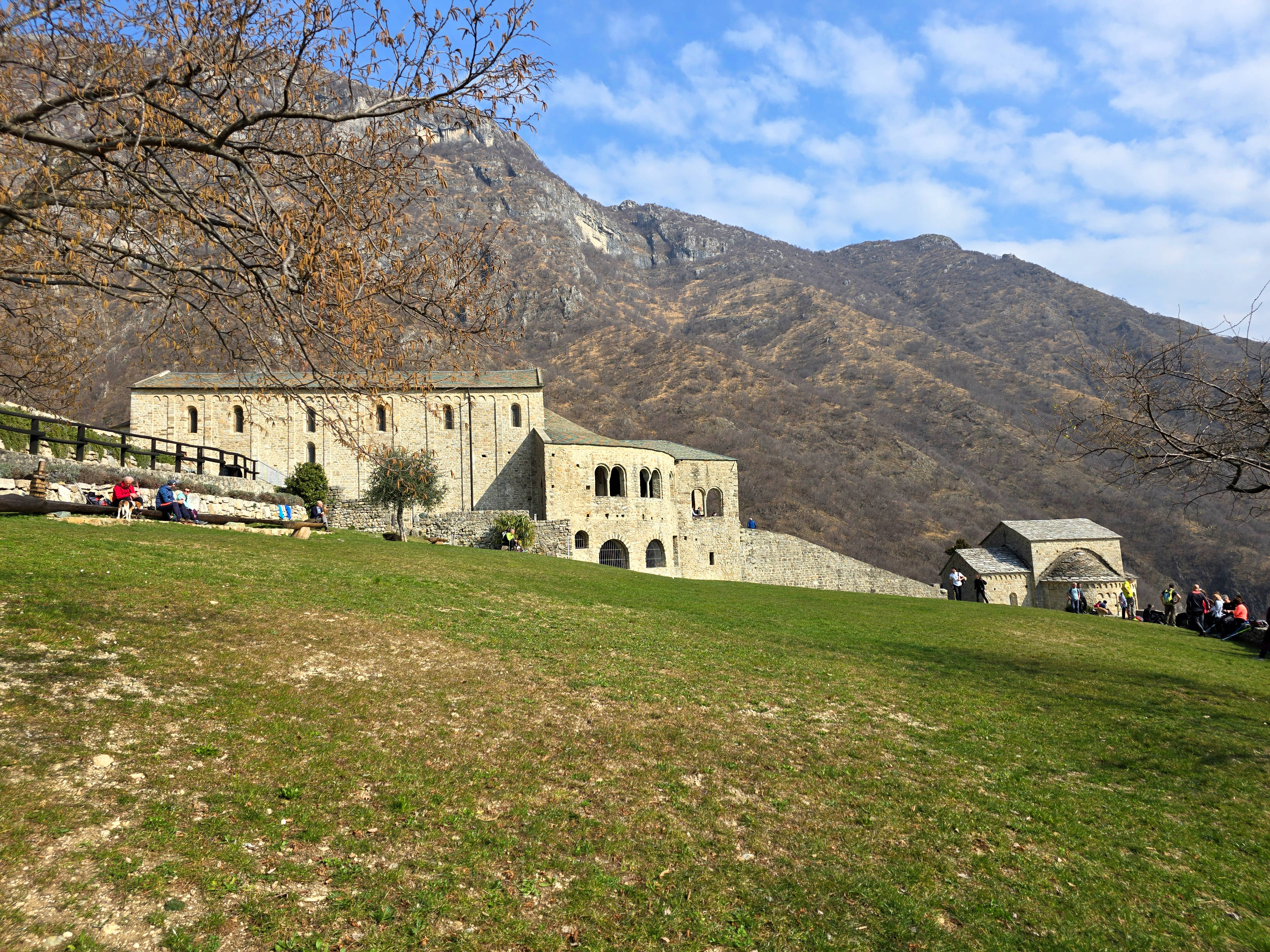
Civate: Abbey of San Pietro al Monte

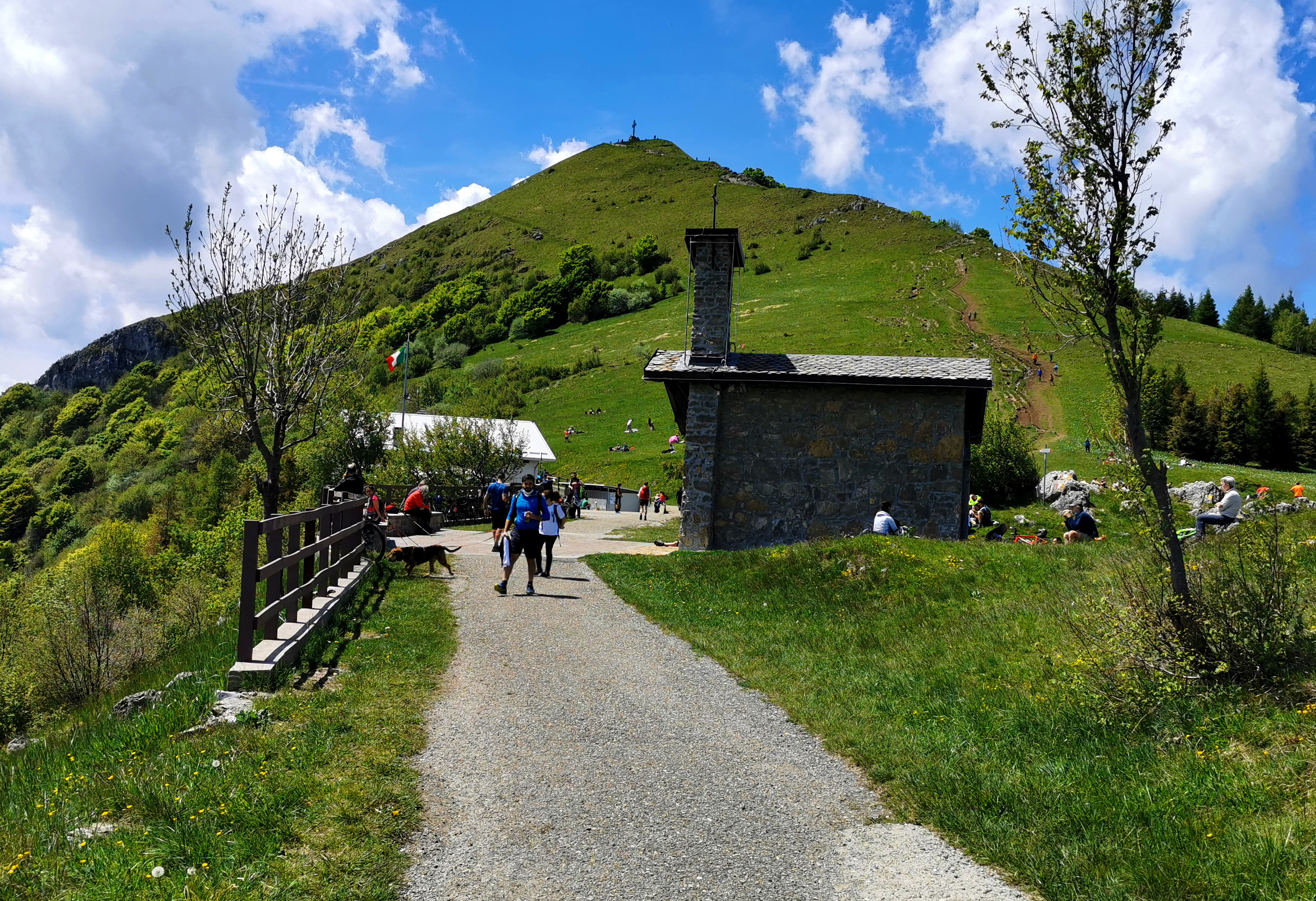
Fonti di Gajum / Canzo: Monte Cornizzolo, seen from Rifugio Marisa Consigliere

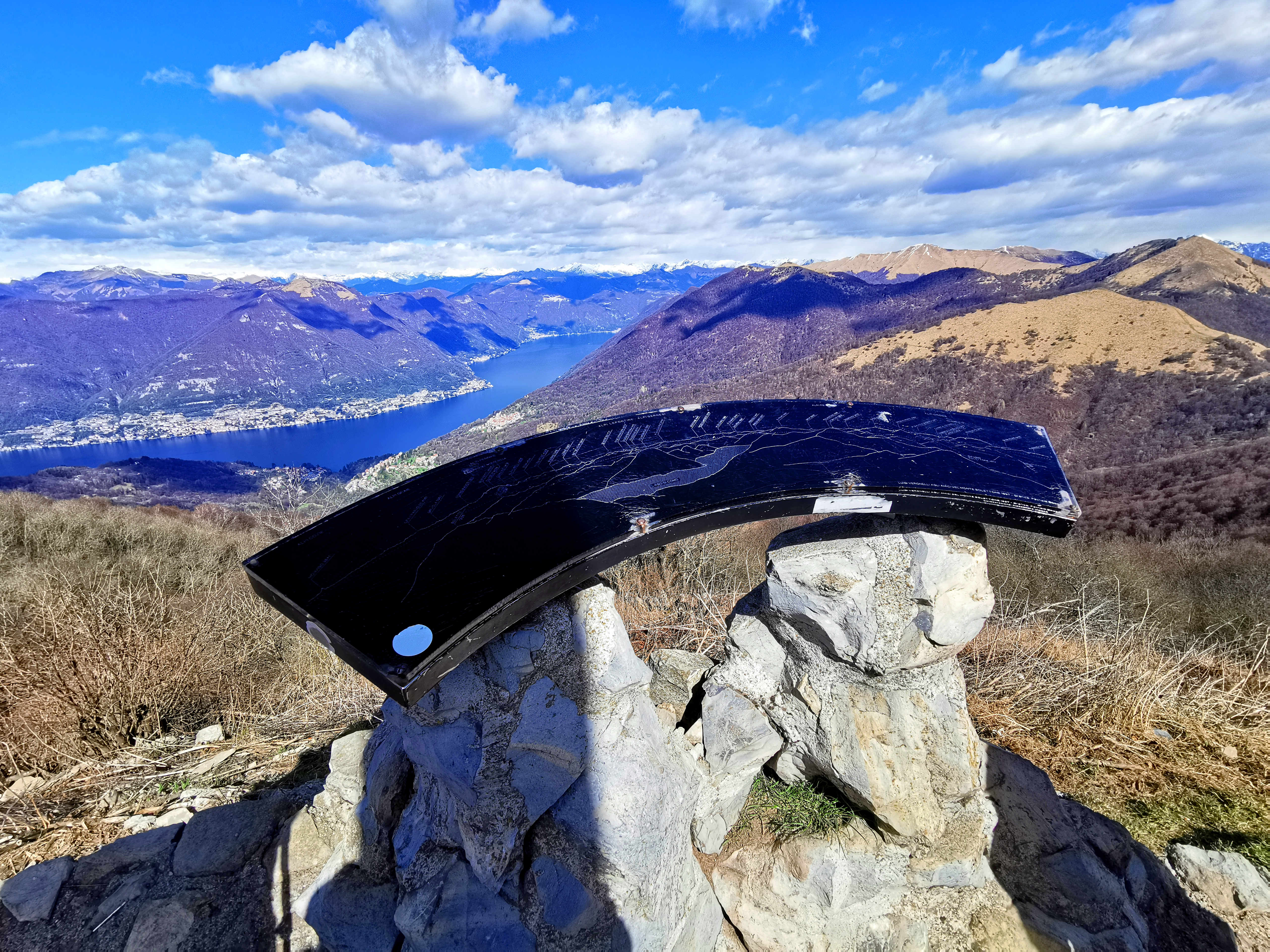
Alpe del Vicerè / Albavilla: view from Monte Bollettone, with Lake Como in background

== See also ==
- Canzo
- Curtis Casalensis
- Lago del Segrino
- Corni di Canzo (Canzo's Horns)
- Cornizzolo
- Giubiana
- Canzés dialect
- Brianza
- Province of Como

== Bibliography ==
- Longoni, Virginio (1998). Religiosità e cultura del Rinascimento nel Triangolo Lariano. Immagini di un'epoca. Canzo: Comunità Montana del Triangolo Lariano, Assessorato alla Cultura.
- Longoni, Virginio (1999). Fonti per la storia del Triangolo Lariano. Il medioevo, Canzo: Comunità Montana del Triangolo Lariano, Assessorato alla Cultura.
