= Sormano =

Sormano Surman (Lombard)
- Comune
- Comune di Sormano
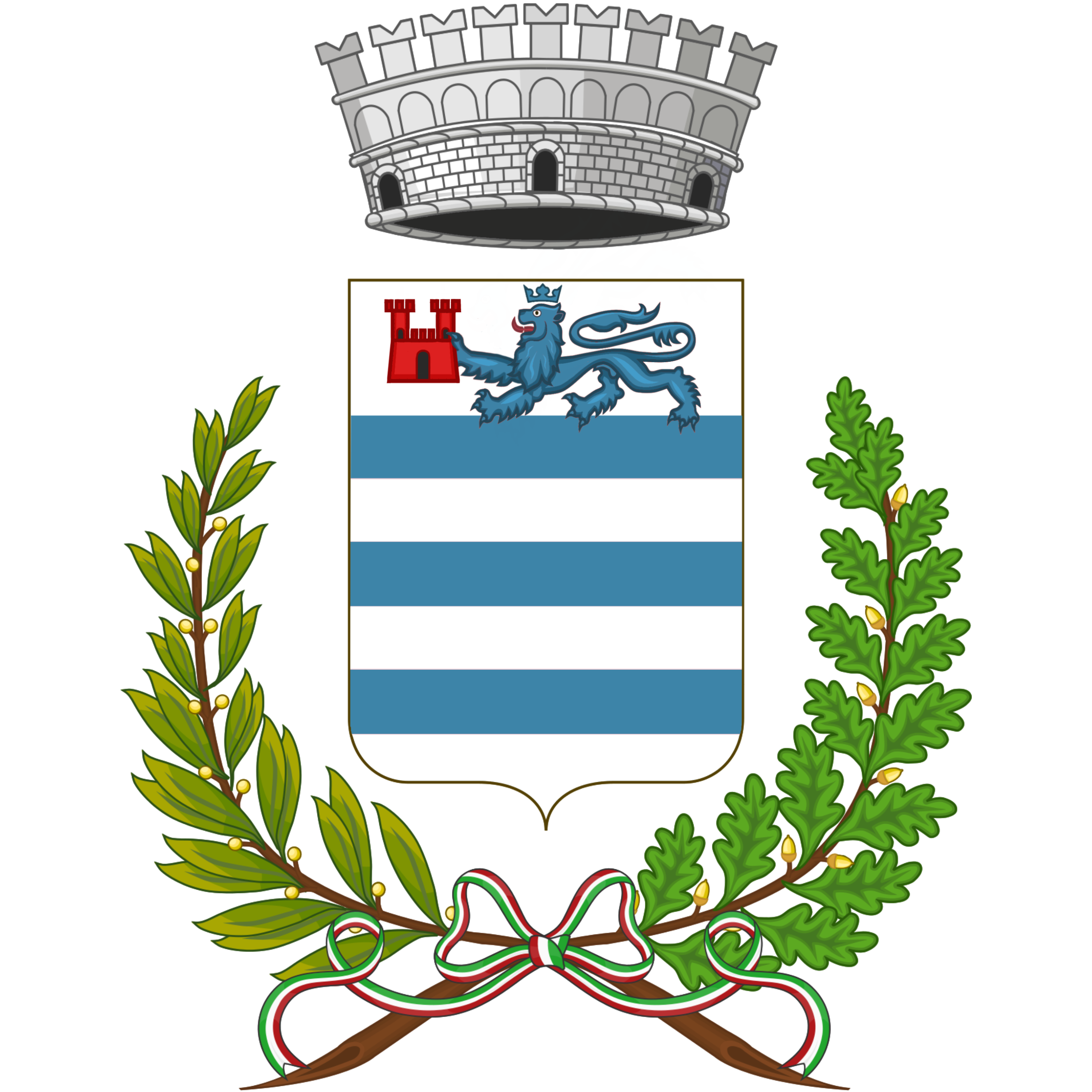
- Coat of arms

- Location within Italy Location within Lombardy
- Coordinates: 45°53′N 9°15′E
- Country: Italy
- Region: Lombardy
- Province: Como (CO)

Government
  - Mayor: Claudio D'Elia

Area
  - Total: 11.0 km^{2} (4.2 sq mi)
- Elevation: 850 m (2,790 ft)

Population (31 December 2004)
  - Total: 703
  - Density: 63.9/km^{2} (166/sq mi)
- Demonym: Sormanesi
- Time zone: UTC+1 (CET)
  - Summer (DST): UTC+2 (CEST)
- Postal code: 22030
- Dialing code: 031

Sormano (Valassinese Lombard: Surman [surˈmaŋ]) is a comune (municipality) in the Province of Como in the Italian region Lombardy, located about 45 kilometres (28 mi) north of Milan and about 15 kilometres (9 mi) northeast of Como. It is part of the mountain community of the Triangolo lariano, a local government with Canzo as its chief town and comprising the peninsula between the two branches of Lake Como.

Sormano borders the following municipalities: Asso, Barni, Bellagio, Caglio, Lasnigo, Magreglio, Nesso, Zelbio.

The Muro di Sormano is one of the most severe hills to have been used in road cycling. It is associated with the Giro di Lombardia.

== Twin towns ==
- San Cipriano Picentino, Italy, since 2007
