= Zelbio =

Zelbio Gèlbi (Lombard)
- Comune
- Comune di Zelbio
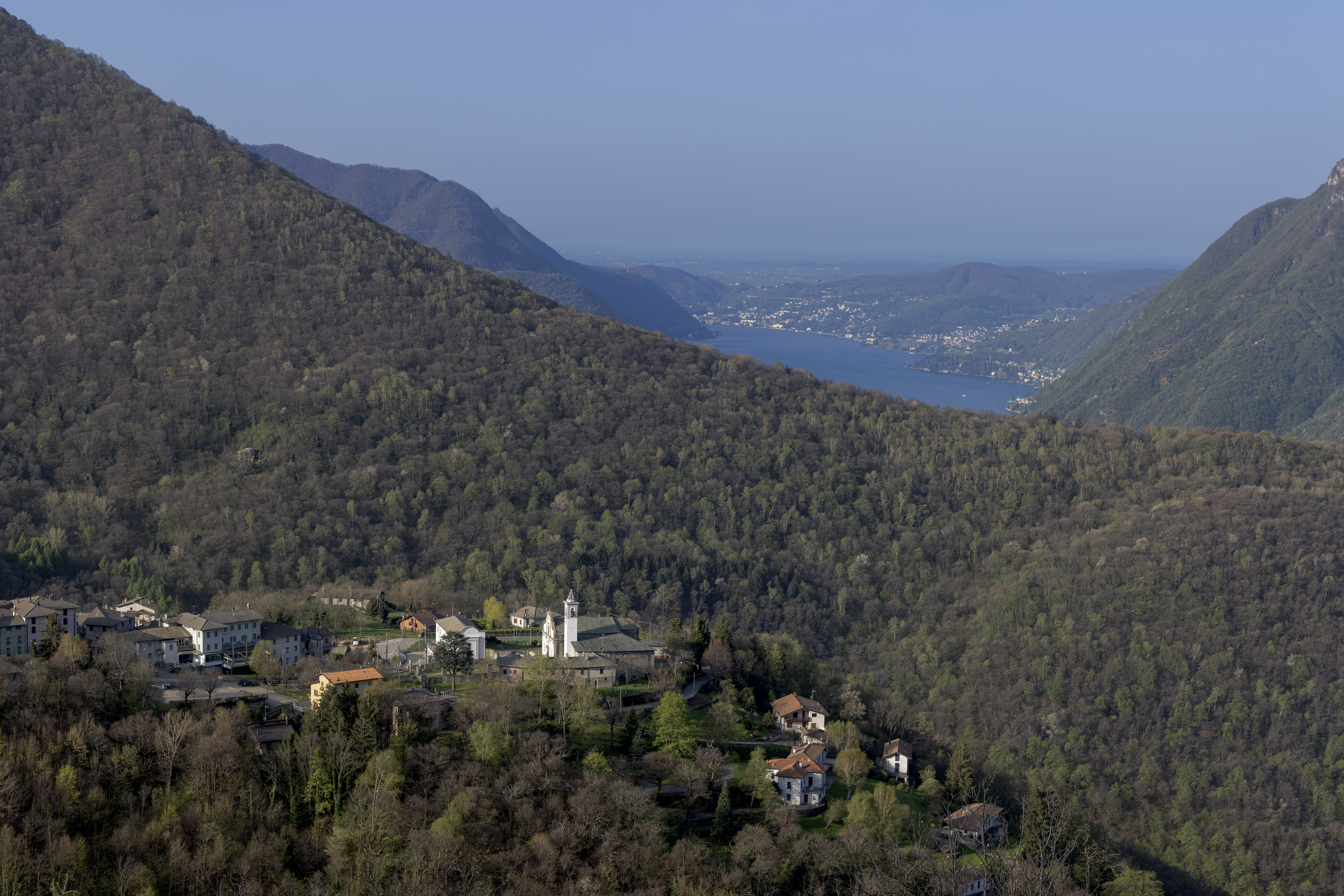
- Panorama of Zelbio

- Location within Italy Location within Lombardy
- Coordinates: 45°54′N 9°11′E
- Country: Italy
- Region: Lombardy
- Province: Province of Como (CO)

Area
  - Total: 4.7 km^{2} (1.8 sq mi)

Population (Dec. 2004)
  - Total: 206
  - Density: 44/km^{2} (110/sq mi)
- Time zone: UTC+1 (CET)
  - Summer (DST): UTC+2 (CEST)
- Postal code: 22020
- Dialing code: 031
- Website: Official website

Zelbio (Comasco: Gèlbi [ˈdʒɛlbi]) is a comune (municipality) in the Province of Como in the Italian region Lombardy, located about 50 kilometres (31 mi) north of Milan and about 12 kilometres (7 mi) northeast of Como. As of 31 December 2004, it had a population of 206 and an area of 4.7 square kilometres (1.8 mi^{2}).

Zelbio borders the following municipalities: Bellagio, Lezzeno, Nesso, Sormano, Veleso.

== Demographic evolution ==
Historical population

Year	Pop.	±%
1861	450	—
1871	421	−6.4%
1881	387	−8.1%
1901	368	−4.9%
1911	380	+3.3%

Year	Pop.	±%
1921	420	+10.5%
1931	421	+0.2%
1936	402	−4.5%
1951	383	−4.7%
1961	332	−13.3%

Year	Pop.	±%
1971	259	−22.0%
1981	209	−19.3%
1991	182	−12.9%
2001	195	+7.1%

Source: Data from ISTAT
