= Veleso =

Veleso Veles (Lombard)
- Comune
- Comune di Veleso
- Location within Italy Location within Lombardy
- Coordinates: 45°54′N 9°11′E
- Country: Italy
- Region: Lombardy
- Province: Province of Como (CO)

Area
  - Total: 5.9 km^{2} (2.3 sq mi)

Population (Dec. 2004)
  - Total: 275
  - Density: 47/km^{2} (120/sq mi)
- Time zone: UTC+1 (CET)
  - Summer (DST): UTC+2 (CEST)
- Postal code: 22020
- Dialing code: 031

Veleso (Comasco: Veles [ˈʋeːles]) is a comune (municipality) in the Province of Como in the Italian region Lombardy, located about 50 kilometres (31 mi) north of Milan and about 12 kilometres (7 mi) northeast of Como. As of 31 December 2004, it had a population of 275 and an area of 5.9 square kilometres (2.3 mi^{2}).

Veleso borders the following municipalities: Bellagio, Lezzeno, Nesso, Zelbio.

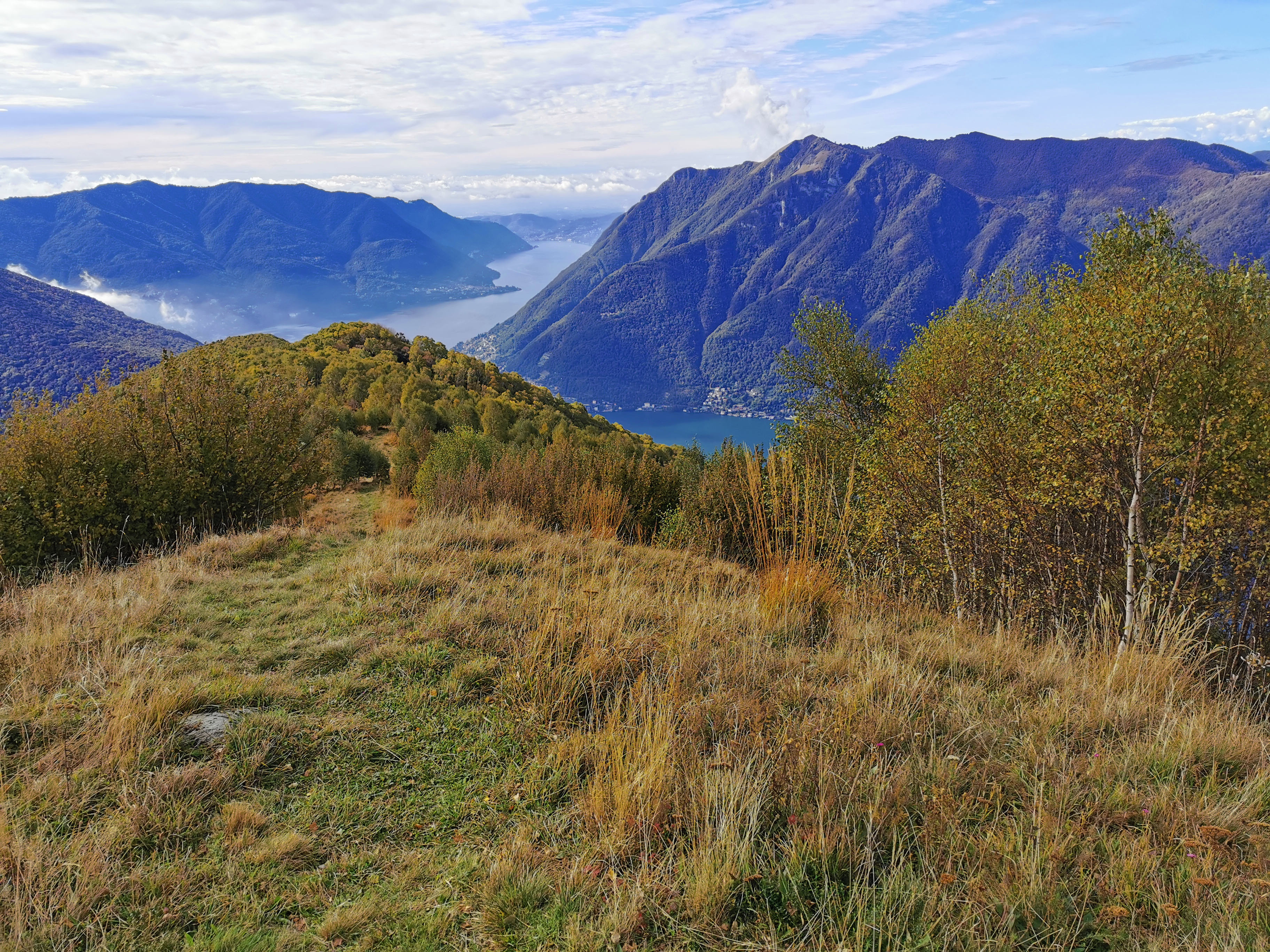
Lake Como, seen from the trail to Monte Colmenacco from Veleso

Monte Colmenacco (1281 m above sea level) is located in the Triangolo Lariano and is part of the Monte San Primo mountain range. The most popular hikes depart from Veleso or the hamlet of Erno. Along the trails, glimpses of Lake Como and the Monte San Primo ridge can be seen.

== Demographic evolution ==
Historical population

Year	Pop.	±%
1861	651	—
1871	616	−5.4%
1881	673	+9.3%
1901	704	+4.6%
1911	751	+6.7%

Year	Pop.	±%
1921	733	−2.4%
1931	660	−10.0%
1936	667	+1.1%
1951	609	−8.7%
1961	464	−23.8%

Year	Pop.	±%
1971	377	−18.8%
1981	284	−24.7%
1991	235	−17.3%
2001	297	+26.4%

Source: Data from ISTAT
