= Lezzeno =

Lezzeno Léscen (Lombard)
- Comune
- Comune di Lezzeno
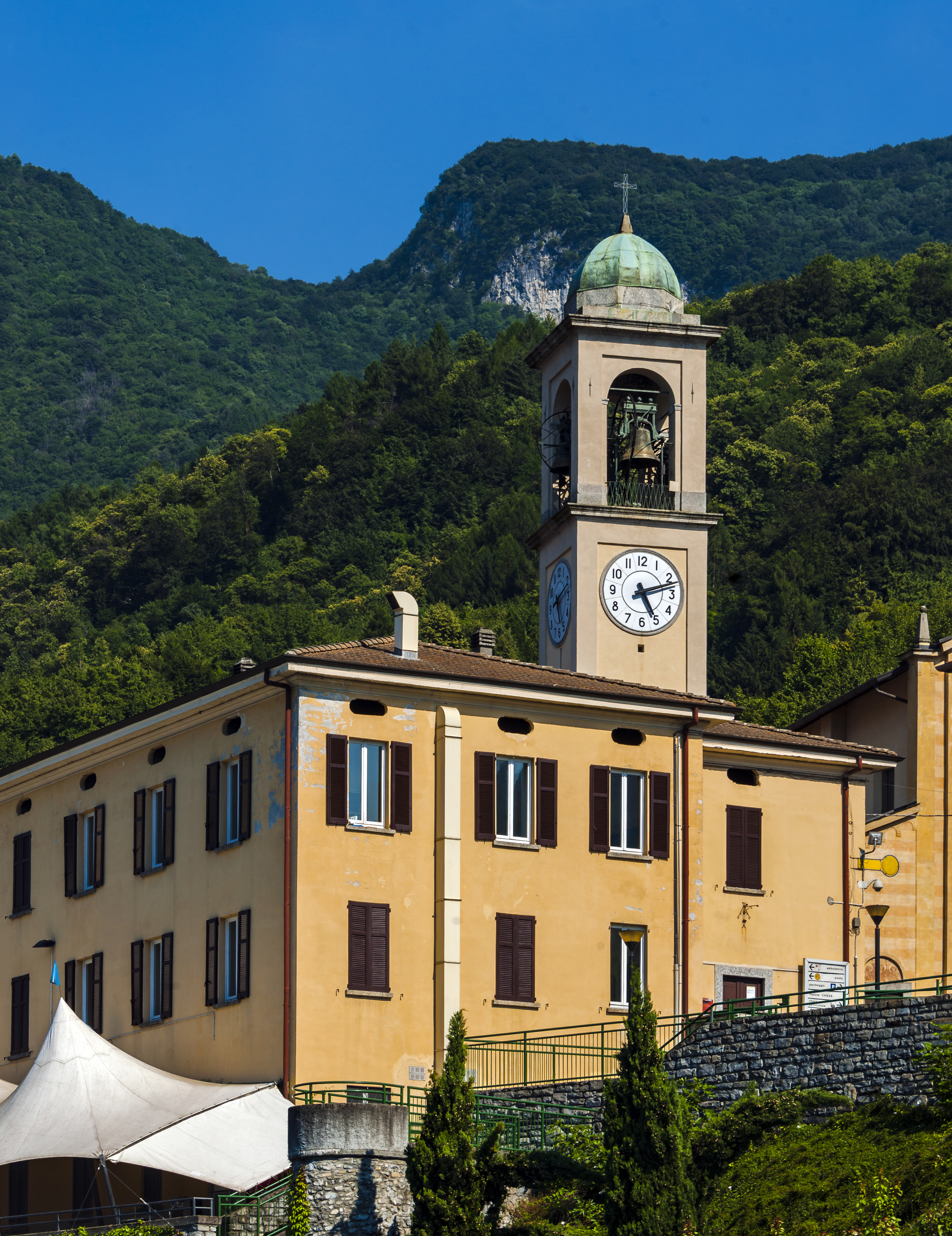
- City hall and church tower

- Location within Italy Location within Lombardy
- Coordinates: 45°57′N 9°12′E
- Country: Italy
- Region: Lombardy
- Province: Province of Como (CO)

Area
  - Total: 22.5 km^{2} (8.7 sq mi)

Population (Dec. 2004)
  - Total: 2,088
  - Density: 92.8/km^{2} (240/sq mi)
- Time zone: UTC+1 (CET)
  - Summer (DST): UTC+2 (CEST)
- Postal code: 22025
- Dialing code: 031

Lezzeno (Comasco: Léscen [ˈleːʃẽ]) is a comune (municipality) in the Province of Como in the Italian region Lombardy, located about 50 kilometres (31 mi) north of Milan and about 15 kilometres (9 mi) northeast of Como. As of 31 December 2004, it had a population of 2,088 and an area of 22.5 square kilometres (8.7 mi^{2}).

Lezzeno borders the following municipalities: Argegno, Bellagio, Colonno, Lenno, Nesso, Ossuccio, Sala Comacina, Tremezzo, Veleso, Zelbio.

== Demographic evolution ==
Historical population

Year	Pop.	±%
1861	1,293	—
1871	1,448	+12.0%
1881	1,727	+19.3%
1901	1,657	−4.1%
1911	1,880	+13.5%

Year	Pop.	±%
1921	1,950	+3.7%
1931	1,856	−4.8%
1936	1,840	−0.9%
1951	1,902	+3.4%
1961	1,928	+1.4%

Year	Pop.	±%
1971	1,978	+2.6%
1981	1,980	+0.1%
1991	1,959	−1.1%
2001	2,071	+5.7%

Source: Data from ISTAT
