= Muro di Sormano =

Hill in Sormano, Italy

Coordinates: 45.8828°N 9.2433°E

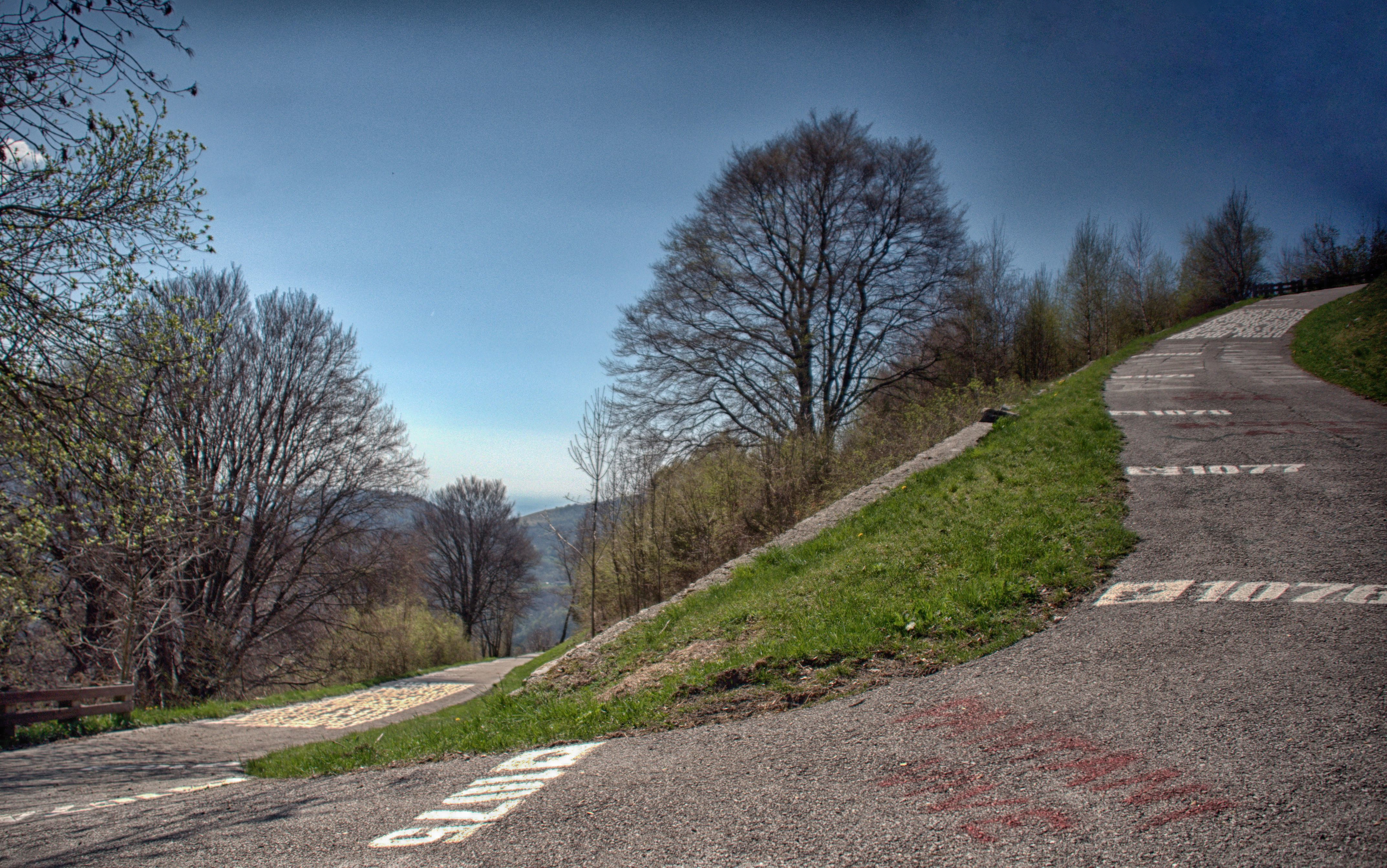
- Muro di Sormano at 1075 m above sea level
- Location: Lombardia
- Start: Sormano
- Gain in altitude: 239 m (784 ft)
- Length of climb: 1.7 km (1.1 mi)
- Maximum elevation: 1,128 m (3,701 ft)
- Average gradient: 17 %
- Maximum gradient: 27 %

The Muro di Sormano (English: Wall of Sormano) is a hill located in Sormano, Italy. This climb is one of the most severe to have been used in road cycling, with an average gradient of 17% and a maximum of 27%. The road up the climb, fell into disuse from 1963 to 2006. After pressure from local cyclists it was restored, and now features split-times and quotes from the riders of the climb in the 1960s era stencilled on the road. The current record time for the climb is 7 minutes 36 seconds, achieved by local rider Matteo Cappè.

== Giro di Lombardia ==
The Muro is associated with the Giro di Lombardia, a one-day race which featured the climb three times from 1960 to 1962. However, after complaints that the climb was so steep that riders were either falling off or being pushed up by fans, the climb was taken off the route. The rider Ercole Baldini dominated the climb during this period, although he later said that he was "ashamed to hold the record" because of this.

After its restoration, the climb returned to the route during the 2012 edition, about 80 km from the finish of the race and before the less brutal Madonna del Ghisallo climb. French rider Romain Bardet (Ag2r–La Mondiale) was the leader at the summit, although the eventual winner of the race was the Spaniard Joaquim Rodríguez.
