= Lasnigo =

Lasnigo Lasnigh (Lombard)
- Comune
- Comune di Lasnigo
- Location within Italy Location within Lombardy
- Coordinates: 45°53′N 9°16′E
- Country: Italy
- Region: Lombardy
- Province: Province of Como (CO)

Area
  - Total: 5.6 km^{2} (2.2 sq mi)

Population (Dec. 2004)
  - Total: 401
  - Density: 72/km^{2} (190/sq mi)
- Time zone: UTC+1 (CET)
  - Summer (DST): UTC+2 (CEST)
- Postal code: 22030
- Dialing code: 031

Lasnigo (Valassinese Lombard: Lasnigh [laˈzniːk]) is a comune (municipality) in the Province of Como in the Italian region Lombardy, located about 45 kilometres (28 mi) north of Milan and about 15 kilometres (9 mi) northeast of Como. As of 31 December 2004, it had a population of 401 and an area of 5.6 km^{2} (2.2 sq mi).

Lasnigo borders the following municipalities: Asso, Barni, Oliveto Lario, Sormano, Valbrona.

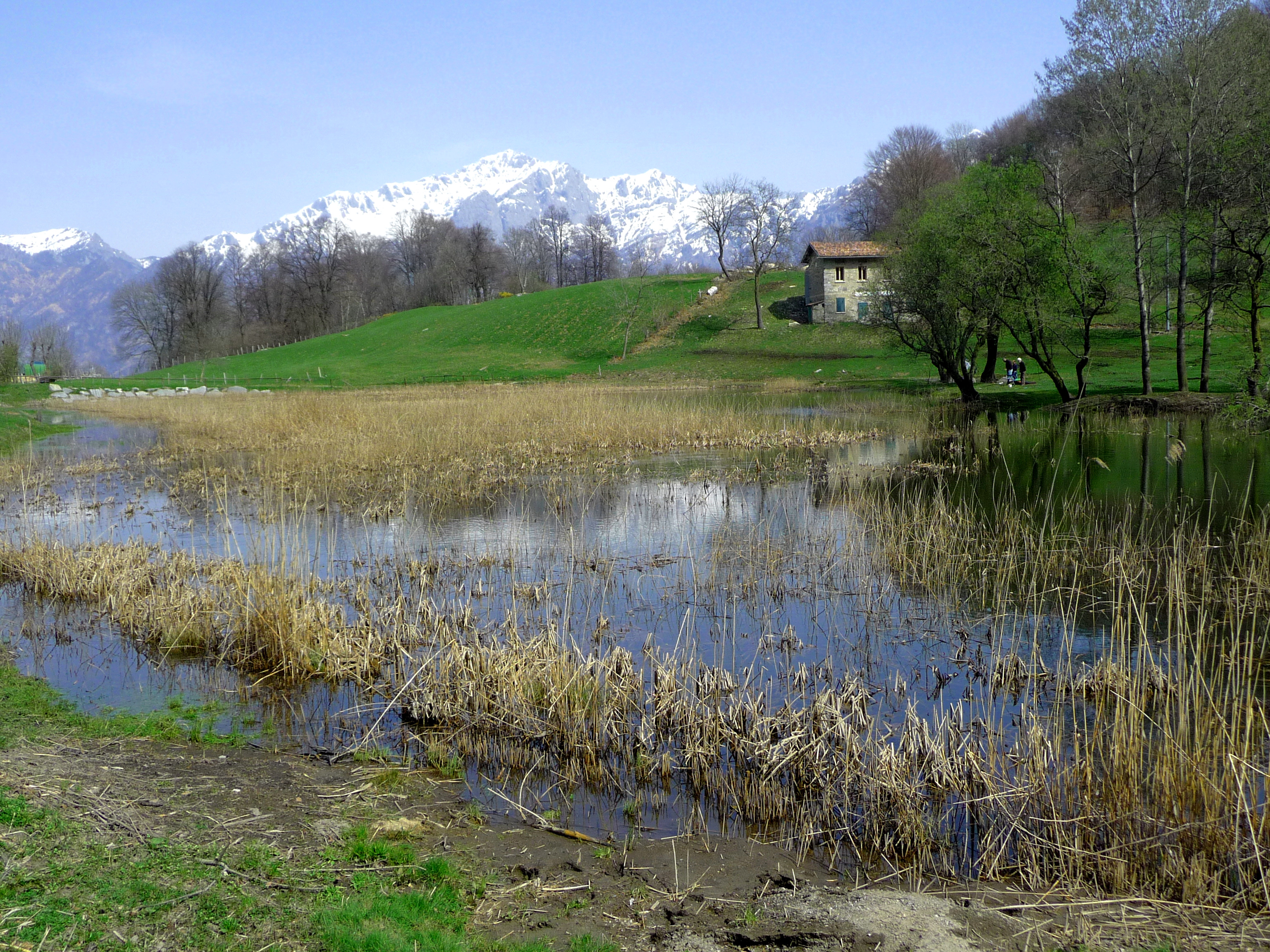
Crezzo Lake, in the Conca di Crezzo area

== Demographic evolution ==
Historical population

Year	Pop.	±%
1861	484	—
1871	494	+2.1%
1881	516	+4.5%
1901	484	−6.2%
1911	524	+8.3%

Year	Pop.	±%
1921	504	−3.8%
1931	453	−10.1%
1936	418	−7.7%
1951	464	+11.0%
1961	495	+6.7%

Year	Pop.	±%
1971	463	−6.5%
1981	396	−14.5%
1991	401	+1.3%
2001	406	+1.2%

Source: Data from ISTAT
