= Laghée dialect =

Western Lombard dialect of Como, Italy

Laghée
- Native to: Italy
- Native speakers: (undated figure of 30,000)
- Language family: Indo-European: Italic; Latino-Faliscan; Romance; Italo-Western; Western Romance; Gallo-Romance; Gallo-Italic; Lombard–Piedmontese?; Lombard; Western Lombard; Comasco-Lecchese; Laghée

Language codes
- ISO 639-3: –
- Glottolog: None

Laghée (pronounced [laˈɡeː]; literally "of the Lake") is a dialect of Western Lombard language spoken in the north of province of Como (Lombardy), on the coast of the eponymous lake.

Singer Davide Van De Sfroos uses a diluted koine inspired by the Laghée dialect as his preferred language for lyrics.
