= Rezzago =

Rezzago Rezagh (Lombard)
- Comune
- Comune di Rezzago
- Location within Italy Location within Lombardy
- Coordinates: 45°52′N 9°15′E
- Country: Italy
- Region: Lombardy
- Province: Province of Como (CO)
- Frazioni: Enco

Area
  - Total: 3.8 km^{2} (1.5 sq mi)
- Elevation: 674 m (2,211 ft)

Population (Nov. 2012)
  - Total: 317
  - Density: 83/km^{2} (220/sq mi)
- Demonym: Rezzaghesi
- Time zone: UTC+1 (CET)
  - Summer (DST): UTC+2 (CEST)
- Postal code: 22030
- Dialing code: 031

Rezzago (Valassinese Lombard: Rezagh [reˈtsaːk]) is a comune (municipality) in the Province of Como in the Italian region Lombardy, located about 45 kilometres (28 mi) north of Milan and about 14 kilometres (9 mi) northeast of Como. As of 30 November 2012, it had a population of 317 and an area of 3.8 square kilometres (1.5 sq mi).

The municipality of Rezzago contains the frazione (subdivision) Enco.

Rezzago borders the following municipalities: Asso, Caglio, Caslino d'Erba.

== Demography ==
=== Demographic evolution ===
Historical population

Year	Pop.	±%
1861	338	—
1871	348	+3.0%
1881	412	+18.4%
1901	436	+5.8%
1911	464	+6.4%

Year	Pop.	±%
1921	435	−6.2%
1931	408	−6.2%
1936	387	−5.1%
1951	377	−2.6%
1961	329	−12.7%

Year	Pop.	±%
1971	308	−6.4%
1981	287	−6.8%
1991	279	−2.8%
2001	274	−1.8%

Source: Data from ISTAT

=== Immigration ===
– Demographic Stats

- Number of immigrants at 2010 (first 4 for nationality)
  - Morocco: 15
  - Bulgaria: 4
  - Moldova: 3
  - Albania: 3
