= Curtis Casalensis =

Italian territorial institution (1346–1797)

Curtis Casalensis (or Curtis Casalis) has been a territorial institution (1346-1797) in Brianza, Lombardy, Italy. Canz was the chief town, and had jurisdiction on the communes of Carella, Caslino, Cassina Mariaga, Castelmarte, Longone, Mariaga, Penzano and Proserpio. The formal foundation is dated 1403, during the rule of the House of Visconti in Milan, but its existence is attested at least since 1346 with the name of Team of Canzo (Squadra Cantii).

In 1435, along with eight other pieves and communal teams (Pieves of Oggiono, Missaglia, Garlate, Brivio, part of that of Agliate, and the teams of Nibionno and that of Mauri), formed the Universitas Montis Briantiae, an aggregation of Medieval communes with voice in front of the ducal authority, and in particular in front of the revenue authority. The Universitas Montis Briantiae was a "little republic or, more precisely, an autonomous province within the State of Milan". It consists in the original, historical extent of "Brianza" region, term whose meaning in modern times has been considerably enlarged. In 1485, the Universitas endowed of its own Bank. Those are years of great development of commercial and craft activities, flowering of masons, carpenters, smiths of high technical ability, silk-weave masters, artists and printers appreciated in all Europe.

In 1472, Galeazzo Maria Sforza gave to Negronis' family (Antoni and Damian) (known as Missaglias) rights on Curtis Casalensis. That because they found in the surroundings of Canzo iron ore deposits. Consequently, Canzo began the main source of iron for the Duchy of Milan. For this reason, the coat-of-arms of Canzo, since then, represents "three ovens fashioned in the manner of hives, for melting the iron".
