= Barni =

- Comune
- Comune di Barni
- Location within Italy Location within Lombardy
- Coordinates: 45°55′N 9°16′E
- Country: Italy
- Region: Lombardy
- Province: Como (CO)

Government
  - Mayor: Mauro Caprani

Area
  - Total: 5.9 km^{2} (2.3 sq mi)

Population (Dec. 2004)
  - Total: 565
  - Density: 96/km^{2} (250/sq mi)
- Demonym(s): barnesi (Italian); barnés (Western Lombard
- Time zone: UTC+1 (CET)
  - Summer (DST): UTC+2 (CEST)
- Postal code: 22030
- Dialing code: 031

Barni is a comune (municipality) in the Province of Como in the Lombardy region of Italy. It is located around 50 kilometres (31 mi) north of Milan and about 20 kilometres (12 mi) northeast of Como.

Barni borders the following municipalities: Lasnigo, Magreglio, Oliveto Lario and Sormano.

== Demographic evolution ==
Historical population

Year	Pop.	±%
1861	340	—
1871	370	+8.8%
1881	388	+4.9%
1901	414	+6.7%
1911	406	−1.9%

Year	Pop.	±%
1921	479	+18.0%
1931	461	−3.8%
1936	417	−9.5%
1951	438	+5.0%
1961	361	−17.6%

Year	Pop.	±%
1971	392	+8.6%
1981	401	+2.3%
1991	434	+8.2%
2001	502	+15.7%

Source: Data from ISTAT
