= Canzés dialect =

Western Lombard dialect of Italy

Canzés
- Canzees
- Native to: Italy
- Language family: Indo-European: Italic; Latino-Faliscan; Romance; Italo-Western; Western Romance; Gallo-Romance; Gallo-Italic; Lombard–Piedmontese?; Lombard; Western Lombard; Brianzöö; Canzés

Language codes
- ISO 639-3: –
- Glottolog: None

Canzés (also written Canzees) is a variety of Brianzöö (a Western Lombard dialect) spoken in the commune of Canzo, Italy.

== Historical and Cultural Characteristics ==
Canzés is spoken by approximately 2000 people in and near the town of Canzo. It is similar to common Brianzöö, and to varieties of Vallassina, of Como, of Lecco and of Monza, but it also shares similarities with Milanese because of historical ties with Milan. Its lexicon is partially shared with Brianzöö. In comparison with common Brianzöö, Canzés has a broader variety of stylistic registers, from peasant style to courtly style. Because Canzo is in the northernmost zone of the Brianza, Canzés preserves lexical archaisms better than modern Milanese, and has changed less under the influence of Italian.

In the Linguistic and Ethnographic Atlas of Italy and Southern Switzerland (AIS) of the Universities of Bern and Zurich (1928–1940) and in the Acoustic Vivarium of Italian Languages and Dialects (VivALDI) of the Humboldt University of Berlin (1998–2018) Canzo has been chosen as the only linguistic tracing point of a very large area, including not only the entire macro-Brianza, but also the entire provinces of Como and Milan (except for the Bustocco-Legnanese linguistic island). Indeed, Canzo has characteristics of conservation and authenticity otherwise absent in this geographic area, historically much innovative. For this reason it can be said that Canzés dialect – while preserving, in some of its registers, peculiar local features – is the reference variety for a study of the most archaic elements of the most prestigious variant of the Lombard language (see Milanese dialect).

== Historical origins ==
The language descends from Latin with some influence from a Celtic substratum due to the original inhabitants of the region, the Insubres, Lambrani, Lepontii, and Orobi (local populations already merged with Gauls). Langobardic made an impact as a superstratum, as did the languages of later Spanish, French and Austrian rulers.

== Phonology ==
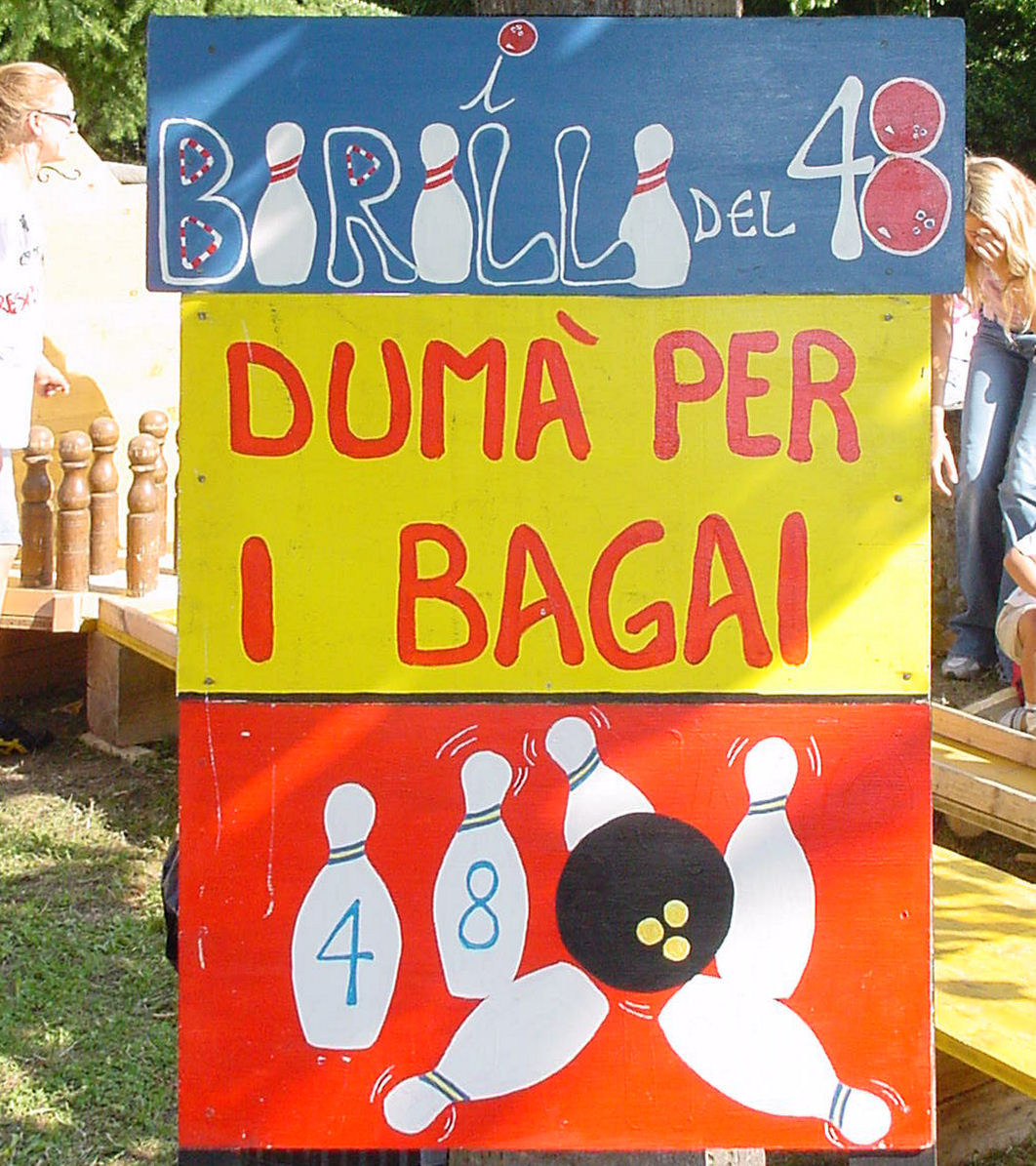
Warning written in Canzes dialect : Only for children

=== Consonants ===
	Bilabial	Labiodental	Alveolar	Postalveolar	Palatal	Velar
Nasal	m		n		ɲ	ŋ
Plosive	p ~ b		t ~ d			k ~ ɡ
Affricate			ts ~ dz	tʃ ~ dʒ		
Fricative		f ~ v	s ~ z	ʃ ~ ʒ		
Trill			r			
Approximant			l			

=== Vowels ===
Contrasts exist between long and short vowels in stressed syllables, but in unstressed syllables the contrast is neutralized.

	Front	Central	Back
Close	i ~ y		u
Close-mid	e ~ ø		o
Open-mid	ɛ		ɔ
Open		a	

- /i/ and /u/ have [ɪ] and [ʊ] respectively as allophones, when stressed and followed by /ŋ/;
- /ø/ and /y/ have [œ] as a rare allophone;
- /y/ is pronounced closed; the open pronunciation is an allophone by analogy, when the vowel is unstressed and in another dialect there is /i/;
- /a/ has [æ] and [ɑ] as allophones by analogy, when the vowel is unstressed and in another dialect there is /a/ or a back vowel respectively.

=== Semivowels ===
Front	Back
j	w

== Comparison with related languages ==
Phonetically, it is evident, for example, the predominance of vowel /a/ or similar (written a), instead of unstressed /e/ (written e). In Canzés, instead of Milanese nasalization of vowel, there is a velar nasal (written n) with abbreviation of the vowel. There are no geminate consonants in words, excepting half-geminate affricate (written z), that never change to /s/. The final consonants are always voiceless. Written v have a very weak sound, almost semivocalic. There are also vowel allophones as [ɪ] and [ʊ], [æ] and [ɑ] (both written a) and more open [y] (written ü, sometimes i when variant of /i/), in addition to basic Western Lombard vowels: /a/ (written a), /e/ (written é), /ɛ/ (written è), /i/ (written i), /o/ (written ó), /ɔ/ (written ò), /ø/ (written ö) with /œ/ (written ö, sometimes ü when variant of /y/), /u/ (written u) and normal /y/ (written ü). Vowels /uː/ and /oː/ are inverted (for example: cóo, head; cuut, whetstone) as to many others Brianzöö and Milanese varieties. Syllables closed by /l/ and based on vowel a, often change it with /ɔ/ (written ò), that, like other rounded consonants also in other Western Lombard varieties, change to [u] when unstressed. Letter s before consonant is usually aspirated. There are many phenomena of assimilation or adaptation, caused by meeting of two words, especially in crashes of consonants. In the word culzùn, trousers, the adesinential plural, the use of /uŋ/, not /õ/, the conservation of z and the mutation cal- > còl- > cul- can be seen.

== Literature ==
In the little written literature, almost totally poetry, bloomed in the 1970s basing on Brianzöö and Milanese literatures (born in the 13th century), it is used a simple orthography, adherent to the pronunciation and based on Italian and Milanese ones, using diaeresis, letter j for semivocalic i, not applying the circumflex accent but the redoubling of long vowels, or the redoubling of consonant for short vowels.

The wide oral literature is composed by proverbs, poems, legends, prayers, that have histories of several centuries. An important role of Canzés and other local languages is in toponyms, often derived from Celtic words, and traditional gentilics.

=== Examples ===
There are some examples of written and oral literature.

Tiritera di piant, Festa di Nost 1993
I radìis, la bruchina, al töri, i föj, i broch,
la gèma, 'l fiuur, la pel quan la lassa 'l sambiòch;
vangàch in giir, desà, insidì e 'l so curtel,
la casciada, al can, la brusaröla, un bel castel;
al pedegagn, al cantìir, la manüela, 'l fioch,
trepà la sciuca, sbrucà e trà a toch;
i tap, la bura, al bigèl e 'l sguasùn,
la sügüür, la filipa, la folc e 'l resegun;
la taca, 'l grup, i recàsc e la fassina,
al caspi, la méda, purtaj sü in cassina;
al tiir da corda, l'ua, 'l büsulott e i rampitt,
al cürlu, i piantun, al cubiètt, i caenitt.
Stimà un busch in pée, cercàn vün da tö,
tra là e fa nà i legn dopu vej purtaa fö.
Dìsan che i radìs ànn da sentì l'Ave Maria:
forzi anca in quel gh'è un poo da magìa.

— Tiziano Corti, from In ucasiun

-I pruèrbi végnan a taj perchè gh'ànn metüü céent ann a faj.
-Se piööf al dì da l'Ascensa, per quaranta dì sèm minga sénza.
-A San Bastian, la viöla in man.
-Ambo laurà, tèrno sügütà.
-Mèj un rat in buca a 'l gat che un cristian in man a l'aucat.
-Gh'è tré qualità da dònn: i dònn, i dindònn e i dirlindònn.
-La man ca la fà nà la cüna la tégn in pée 'l muunt.
-La buca l'è minga straca sa la sà minga da vaca.
-Chi mangia la gaìna di òltar, impégna la sua.
-Chi sà 'l latin, lòda l'aqua e béef al vin.
-La févar quartana, i giùin ja rissana, a i vècc la fà sunà la campana.
-Vàr püssée un póo da fedascia che tüt al lègn da la barcascia.
-Céent cóo, céent crap; céent cüü, düséent ciap.
-O da castan o da nuus, ognidün gh'à la sua cruus.

— Proverbs

== Use ==
There are variants also within the borough, according to the social class and the zone, for influence in the first case from Milanese and from common Brianzöö, in the second case from the neighbouring villages. It can be said that every joint family has own dialect of Canzés because, until the half of 20th century, every joint family was very united and isolated in the cuurt (the local kind of courtyard) world.

Canzés, even if it has a consistent heritage of oral and written literature, besides high importance for the local identity, does not have an official recognition, so it is getting uncommon in young generations. Western Lombard has a general recognition, but none from State. UNESCO and Ethnologue consider Lombard language as union of Western Lombard, Eastern Lombard and intermediate varieties.

== Bibliography ==
- Tiziano Corti, In ucasiun, 2005.
- Cumitaa F.N., Librett da la Festa di Nost, 1988–2003.
- Stefano Prina, Al Cadreghin - gazetin di bagaj da Canz, 2003–2007 (in particular n° 9bis of 2006).
- Gigliola Campiotti, Proverbi e modi di dire Lariani, 1997.
- Andrea Rognoni, Grammatica dei dialetti della Lombardia, 2005.
- Several authors, Parlate e dialetti della Lombardia. Lessico comparato, 2003.
