= Lecchese dialect =

Western Lombard dialect of Lecco, Italy

Lecchese
- Native to: Italy
- Language family: Indo-European: Italic; Latino-Faliscan; Romance; Italo-Western; Western Romance; Gallo-Romance; Gallo-Italic; Lombard–Piedmontese?; Lombard; Western Lombard; Comasco-Lecchese; Lecchese

Language codes
- ISO 639-3: –
- Glottolog: None

Lecchese is a dialect of Western Lombard language spoken in the city and suburbs of Lecco (Lombardy).

== Characteristics ==
It has the characteristic, in contrast with the other Comasco-Lecchese dialects, to be influenced by Brianzöö, Valsassinese, Valtellinese and Bergamasque (an Eastern Lombard variety spoken in and around the city of Bergamo).

== Grammar ==
In the use of vergót (coming from Eastern Lombard) instead of Comasco quajcòss (="something"). Another characteristic is the presence of close "e" instead of "i", and of close "o" instead of "u"; the use of suffixes "-om", "-on" instead of "-amm", "-ã"; the use of suffix "-én" instead of "-ĩ"; the use of article "ul".

== See also ==
- Lombard language

== Bibliography ==
- Andrea Rognoni, Grammatica dei dialetti della Lombardia, Oscar Mondadori, 2005.
- Amanzio Aondio - Felice Bassani, Passato da ricordare, Cattaneo Editore Oggiono - Lecco, 1990.
