= Caglio =

Caglio Caj (Lombard)
- Comune
- Comune di Caglio
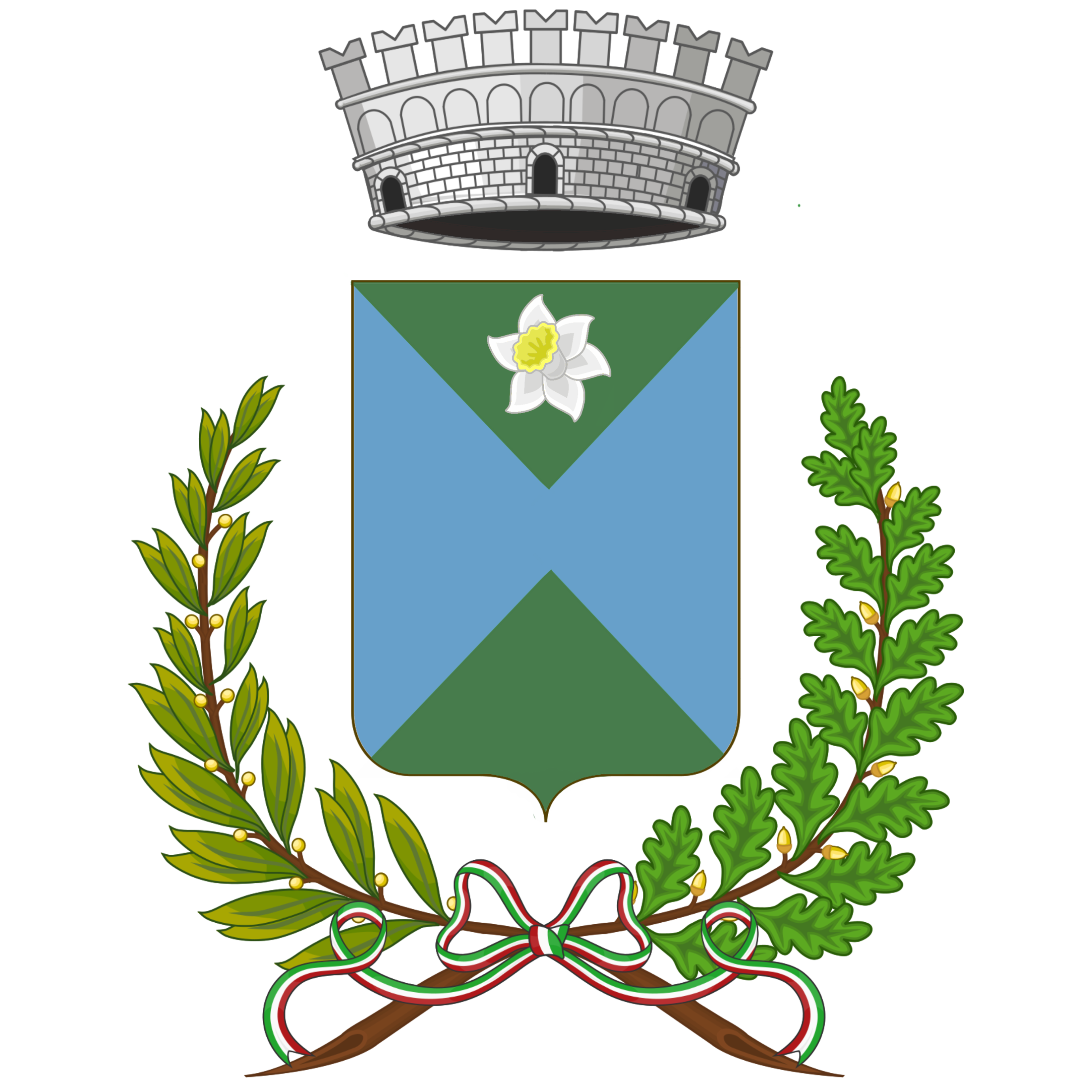
- Coat of arms

- Location within Italy Location within Lombardy
- Coordinates: 45°52′N 9°14′E
- Country: Italy
- Region: Lombardy
- Province: Province of Como (CO)

Area
  - Total: 6.5 km^{2} (2.5 sq mi)
- Elevation: 800 m (2,600 ft)

Population (Dec. 2004)
  - Total: 404
  - Density: 62/km^{2} (160/sq mi)
- Demonym(s): cagliesi (it.); gòss (west.lmo. traditional gentilic)
- Time zone: UTC+1 (CET)
  - Summer (DST): UTC+2 (CEST)
- Postal code: 22030
- Dialing code: 031

Caglio (Valassinese Lombard: Caj [ˈkaj]) is a comune (municipality) in the Province of Como in the Italian region Lombardy, located about 45 kilometres (28 mi) north of Milan and about 13 kilometres (8.1 mi) northeast of Como. As of 31 December 2004, it had a population of 404 and an area of 6.5 square kilometres (2.5 mi^{2}).

Caglio borders the following municipalities: Asso, Caslino d'Erba, Faggeto Lario, Nesso, Rezzago, Sormano.

== Demographic evolution ==
Historical population

Year	Pop.	±%
1861	526	—
1871	529	+0.6%
1881	572	+8.1%
1901	534	−6.6%
1911	544	+1.9%

Year	Pop.	±%
1921	596	+9.6%
1931	558	−6.4%
1936	521	−6.6%
1951	462	−11.3%
1961	432	−6.5%

Year	Pop.	±%
1971	426	−1.4%
1981	397	−6.8%
1991	371	−6.5%
2001	369	−0.5%

Source: Data from ISTAT
