= Civenna =

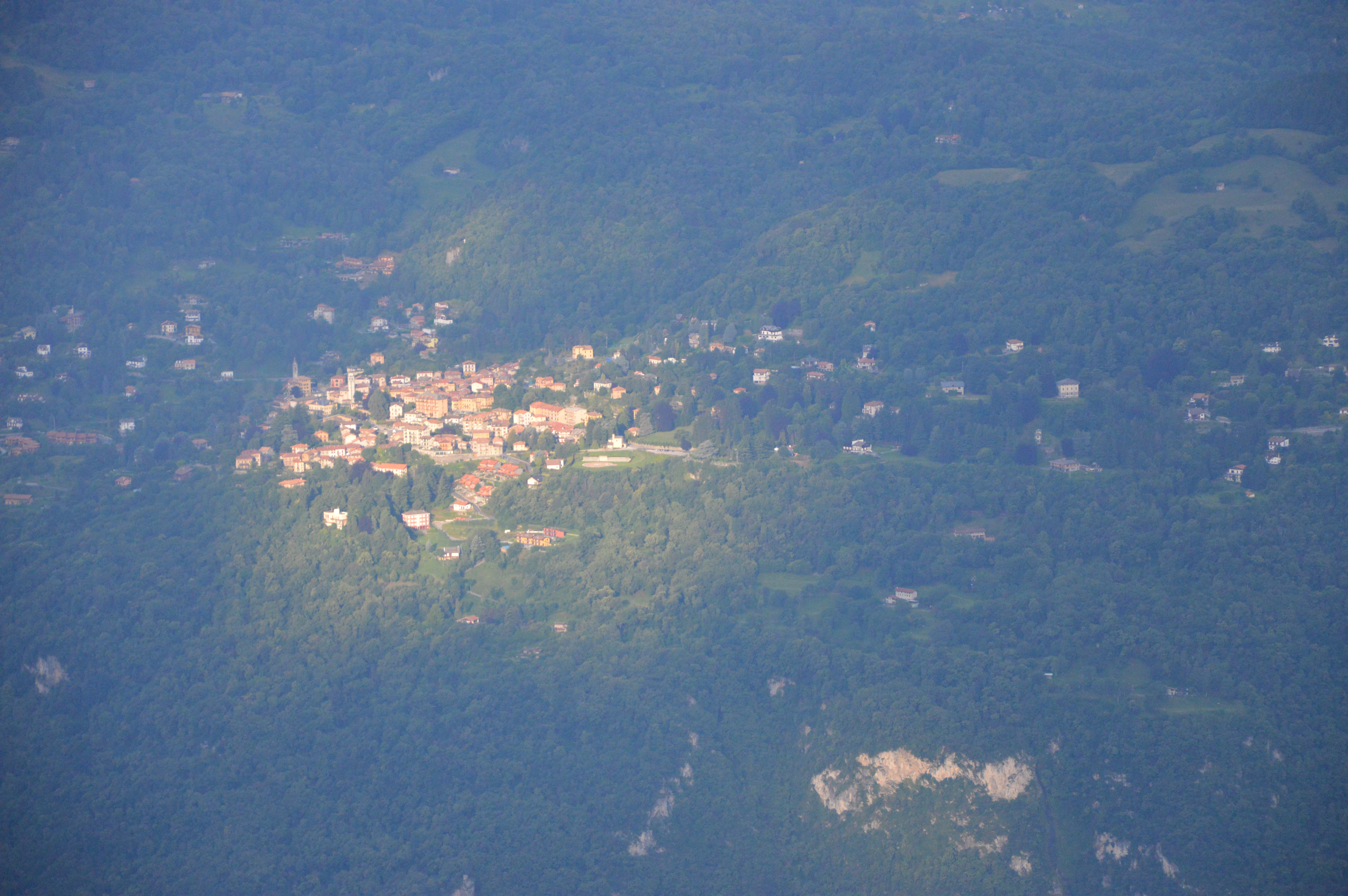
Civenna seen from Cima di Monte Cucco.

Civenna (Western Lombard: Scivenna, locally Sciuvenna [ʃyˈ(ʋ)ɛna]) is a frazione of the comune (municipality) of Bellagio in the Province of Como in the Italian region of Lombardy, located about 50 kilometres (31 mi) north of Milan and about 20 kilometres (12 mi) northeast of Como. It was an independent commune until 21 January 2014. In 2010 it had some 720 inhabitants.

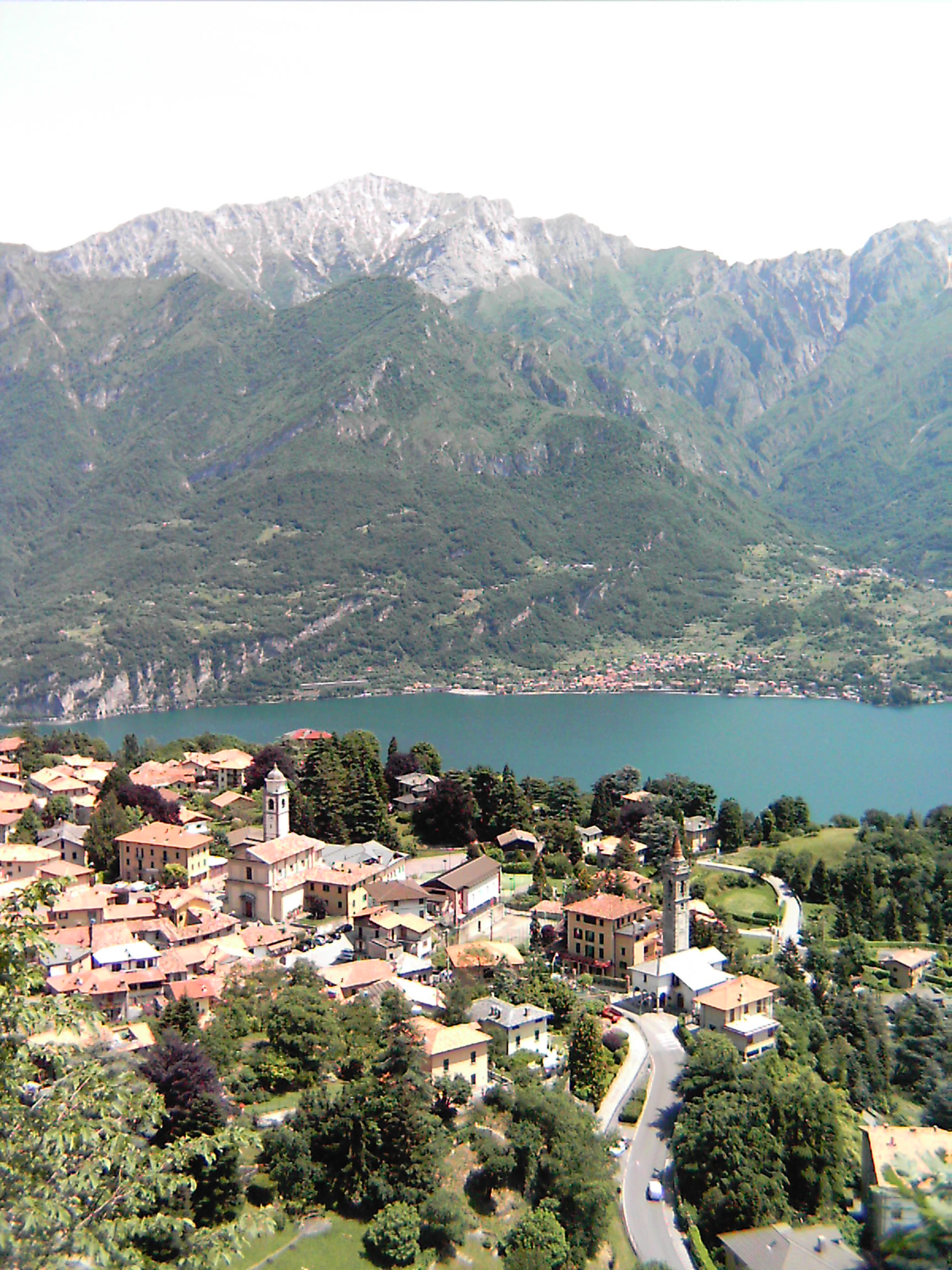
Landscape of Civenna with the Como Lake and the Grigna
