= Valbrona =

Valbrona Valbroeuna (Lombard)
- Comune
- Comune di Valbrona

- Location within Italy Location within Lombardy
- Coordinates: 45°52′N 9°18′E
- Country: Italy
- Region: Lombardy
- Province: Province of Como (CO)

Area
  - Total: 13.9 km^{2} (5.4 sq mi)
- Elevation: 494 m (1,621 ft)

Population (Dec. 2004)
  - Total: 2,575
  - Density: 185/km^{2} (480/sq mi)
- Time zone: UTC+1 (CET)
  - Summer (DST): UTC+2 (CEST)
- Postal code: 22039
- Dialing code: 031

Valbrona (Comasco: Valbroeuna [ʋalˈbrøːna]) is a comune (municipality) in the Province of Como in the Italian region Lombardy, located about 45 kilometres (28 mi) north of Milan and about 20 kilometres (12 mi) northeast of Como. As of 31 December 2004, it had a population of 2,575 and an area of 13.9 square kilometres (5.4 mi^{2}).

Valbrona borders the following municipalities: Abbadia Lariana, Asso, Canzo, Lasnigo, Mandello del Lario, Oliveto Lario, Valmadrera.

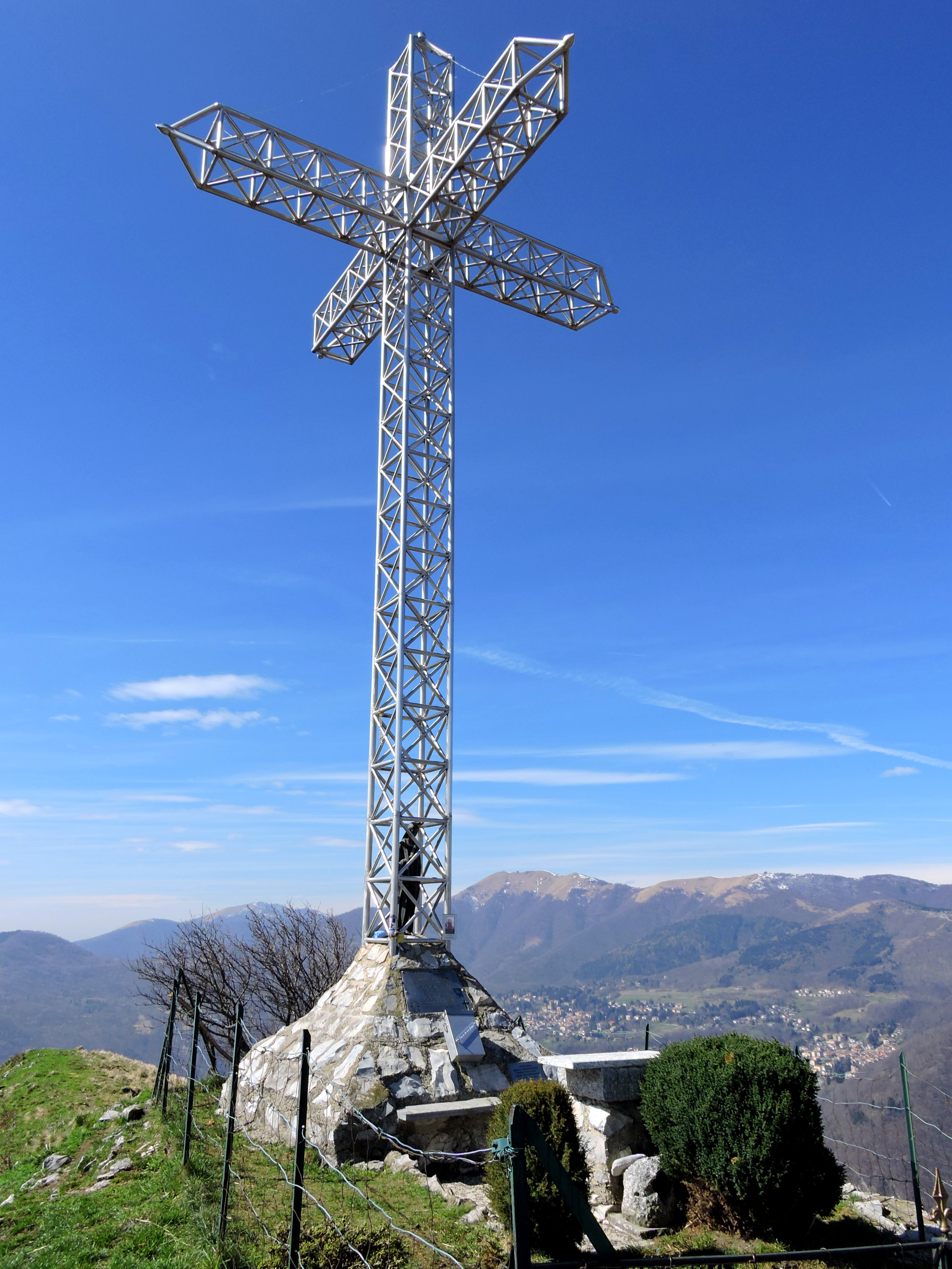
Jubilee Cross on Mount Megna

== Demographic evolution ==
Historical population

Year	Pop.	±%
1861	1,949	—
1871	1,920	−1.5%
1881	1,910	−0.5%
1901	1,976	+3.5%
1911	2,015	+2.0%

Year	Pop.	±%
1921	1,889	−6.3%
1931	1,803	−4.6%
1936	1,787	−0.9%
1951	1,897	+6.2%
1961	1,944	+2.5%

Year	Pop.	±%
1971	2,071	+6.5%
1981	2,054	−0.8%
1991	2,161	+5.2%
2001	2,451	+13.4%

Source: Data from ISTAT
