= List of municipalities of the Province of Lecco =

The following is a list of the 84 municipalities (comuni) of the Province of Lecco in the region of Lombardy in Italy.

== List ==
Municipality	Population (2026)	Area (km²)	Density
Abbadia Lariana	3,138	16.67	188.2
Airuno	2,928	4.29	682.5
Annone di Brianza	2,283	5.98	381.8
Ballabio	4,181	15.04	278.0
Barzago	2,407	3.56	676.1
Barzanò	5,047	3.62	1,394.2
Barzio	1,269	21.35	59.4
Bellano	3,357	22.03	152.4
Bosisio Parini	3,199	5.82	549.7
Brivio	4,351	7.95	547.3
Bulciago	2,925	3.12	937.5
Calco	5,476	4.59	1,193.0
Calolziocorte	13,593	9.10	1,493.7
Carenno	1,390	7.79	178.4
Casargo	833	19.71	42.3
Casatenovo	13,234	12.66	1,045.3
Cassago Brianza	4,395	3.55	1,238.0
Cassina Valsassina	549	2.72	201.8
Castello di Brianza	2,633	3.59	733.4
Cernusco Lombardone	3,837	3.74	1,025.9
Cesana Brianza	2,327	3.70	628.9
Civate	3,709	9.27	400.1
Colico	8,188	35.06	233.5
Colle Brianza	1,860	8.32	223.6
Cortenova	1,173	11.77	99.7
Costa Masnaga	4,738	5.62	843.1
Crandola Valsassina	261	8.81	29.6
Cremella	1,689	1.89	893.7
Cremeno	1,839	13.18	139.5
Dervio	2,518	11.70	215.2
Dolzago	2,544	2.26	1,125.7
Dorio	325	11.66	27.9
Ello	1,187	2.42	490.5
Erve	644	6.20	103.9
Esino Lario	751	18.05	41.6
Galbiate	8,426	15.64	538.7
Garbagnate Monastero	2,503	3.50	715.1
Garlate	2,661	3.30	806.4
Imbersago	2,565	3.14	816.9
Introbio	1,948	26.03	74.8
La Valletta Brianza	4,637	8.78	528.1
Lecco	47,326	45.14	1,048.4
Lierna	2,111	11.24	187.8
Lomagna	5,118	3.91	1,309.0
Malgrate	4,146	1.90	2,182.1
Mandello del Lario	9,856	43.33	227.5
Margno	421	3.59	117.3
Merate	15,031	11.06	1,359.0
Missaglia	9,010	11.52	782.1
Moggio	492	13.43	36.6
Molteno	3,528	3.12	1,130.8
Monte Marenzo	1,775	3.06	580.1
Montevecchia	2,680	5.80	462.1
Monticello Brianza	4,184	4.61	907.6
Morterone	30	13.71	2.2
Nibionno	3,588	3.51	1,022.2
Oggiono	9,218	7.96	1,158.0
Olgiate Molgora	6,414	7.09	904.7
Olginate	6,925	8.00	865.6
Oliveto Lario	1,148	15.70	73.1
Osnago	4,831	4.49	1,075.9
Paderno d'Adda	3,891	3.56	1,093.0
Pagnona	309	9.20	33.6
Parlasco	135	3.00	45.0
Pasturo	1,959	21.78	89.9
Perledo	830	13.68	60.7
Pescate	2,134	2.10	1,016.2
Premana	2,150	33.64	63.9
Primaluna	2,274	22.43	101.4
Robbiate	6,441	4.70	1,370.4
Rogeno	3,050	4.82	632.8
Santa Maria Hoè	2,079	2.83	734.6
Sirone	2,333	3.21	726.8
Sirtori	2,790	4.29	650.3
Sueglio	157	4.11	38.2
Suello	1,704	2.63	647.9
Taceno	595	3.75	158.7
Valgreghentino	3,357	6.25	537.1
Valmadrera	11,233	12.60	891.5
Valvarrone	499	14.93	33.4
Varenna	646	12.57	51.4
Vercurago	2,671	2.12	1,259.9
Verderio	5,516	6.47	852.6
Viganò	2,108	1.60	1,317.5

== See also ==
- List of municipalities of Lombardy
- List of municipalities of Italy
