= Cremeno =

Cremeno Cremée (Lombard)
- Comune
- Comune di Cremeno
- Location of Cremeno in Italy Cremeno (Lombardy)
- Coordinates: 45°56′N 9°28′E
- Country: Italy
- Region: Lombardy
- Province: Lecco (LC)

Government
  - Mayor: Pierluigi Invernizzi

Area
  - Total: 13.18 km^{2} (5.09 sq mi)
- Elevation: 792 m (2,598 ft)

Population (30 June 2017)
  - Total: 1,594
  - Density: 120.9/km^{2} (313.2/sq mi)
- Demonym: Cremensi
- Time zone: UTC+1 (CET)
  - Summer (DST): UTC+2 (CEST)
- Postal code: 23814
- Dialing code: 0341
- Website: Official website

Cremeno (Valassinese Lombard: Cremée) is a comune (municipality) in the Province of Lecco in the Italian region Lombardy, located about 60 kilometres (37 mi) northeast of Milan and about 11 kilometres (7 mi) northeast of Lecco.

Cremeno borders the following municipalities: Ballabio, Barzio, Cassina Valsassina, Morterone, Pasturo.
