= Pasturo =

Pasturo Pastür (Lombard)
- Comune
- Comune di Pasturo
- Location of Pasturo in Italy Pasturo (Lombardy)
- Coordinates: 45°57′N 9°26′E
- Country: Italy
- Region: Lombardy
- Province: Province of Lecco (LC)

Area
  - Total: 22.1 km^{2} (8.5 sq mi)

Population (Dec. 2004)
  - Total: 1,798
  - Density: 81.4/km^{2} (211/sq mi)
- Time zone: UTC+1 (CET)
  - Summer (DST): UTC+2 (CEST)
- Postal code: 23818
- Dialing code: 0341
- Website: Official website

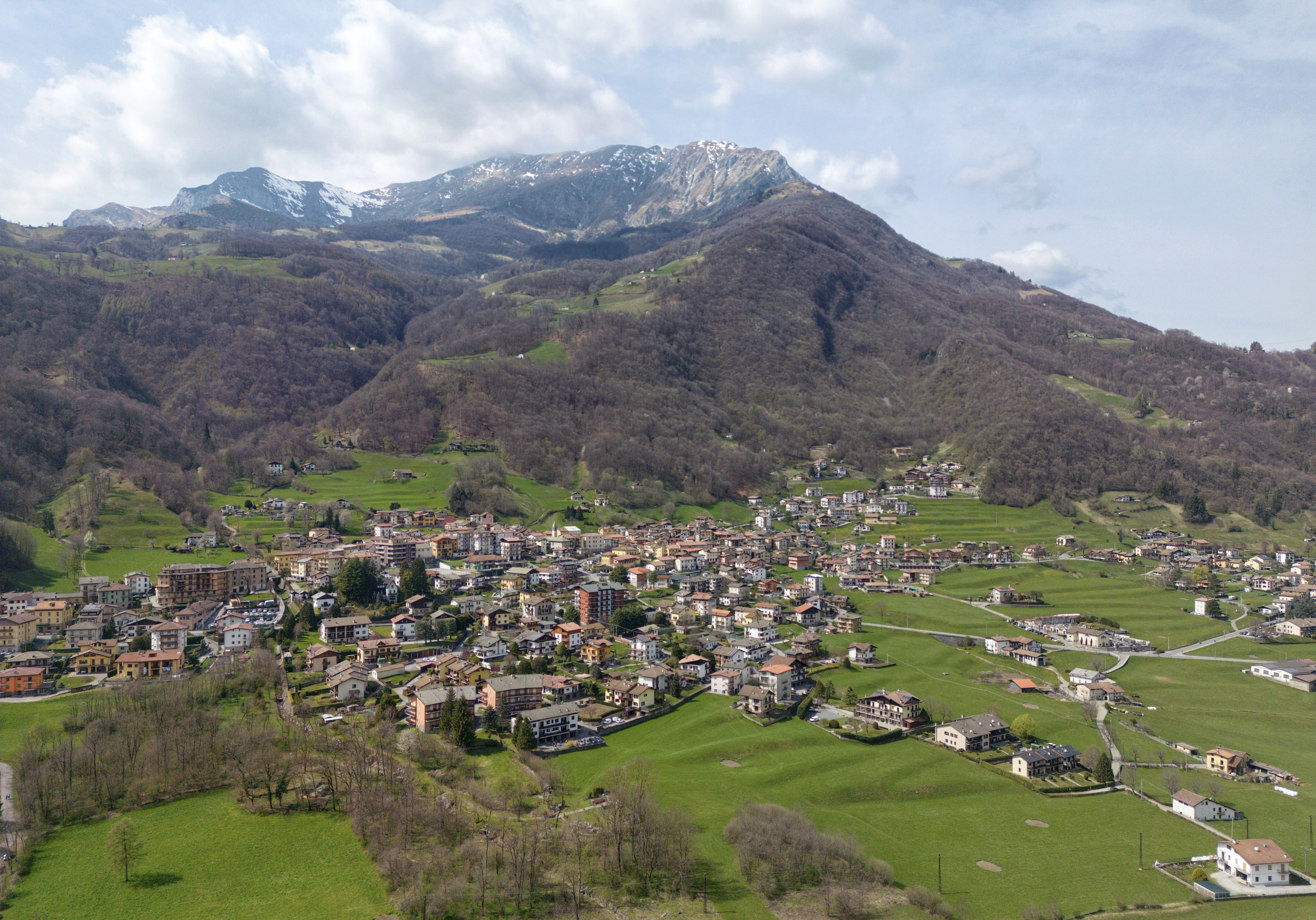

Pasturo (Valassinese Lombard: Pastür) is a comune (municipality) in the Province of Lecco in the Italian region Lombardy, located about 60 kilometres (37 mi) northeast of Milan and about 11 kilometres (7 mi) north of Lecco.

As of 31 December 2004, it had a population of 1,798 and an area of 22.1 square kilometres (8.5 mi^{2}).

Pasturo borders the following municipalities: Ballabio, Barzio, Cremeno, Esino Lario, Introbio, Mandello del Lario, Primaluna.

== History ==
Above Pasturo on a cliff, almost promontory, was the fortress of Bajedo in the mid of 1400s during the time of Francesco Sforza, conquest of the Duchy of Milan. It had a bridge with two arches, already built by Archbishop Giovanni Visconti, which joined the two opposite banks and gave passage to travelers. It was closed by iron doors and was watched by a tower. these fortifications were probably originally erected by the Romans by the advice of Caius Marius, after being defeated by the Cimbri. They called them doors and then "cloistered". The bridge was ruined by the river about 1550. The fortress was dismantled in 1513 with the assent of Trivulzio to which the inhabitants of Valsassino had turned. Today the cliff is bare.

== Demographic evolution ==
Historical population

Year	Pop.	±%
1861	1,123	—
1871	1,059	−5.7%
1881	1,100	+3.9%
1901	1,096	−0.4%
1911	1,255	+14.5%

Year	Pop.	±%
1921	1,352	+7.7%
1931	1,251	−7.5%
1936	1,273	+1.8%
1951	1,223	−3.9%
1961	1,211	−1.0%

Year	Pop.	±%
1971	1,301	+7.4%
1981	1,435	+10.3%
1991	1,498	+4.4%
2001	1,756	+17.2%

Source: Data from ISTAT
