= Renato Corti =

Italian cardinal (1936–2020)

His Eminence Renato Corti
- Cardinal; Bishop emeritus of Novara
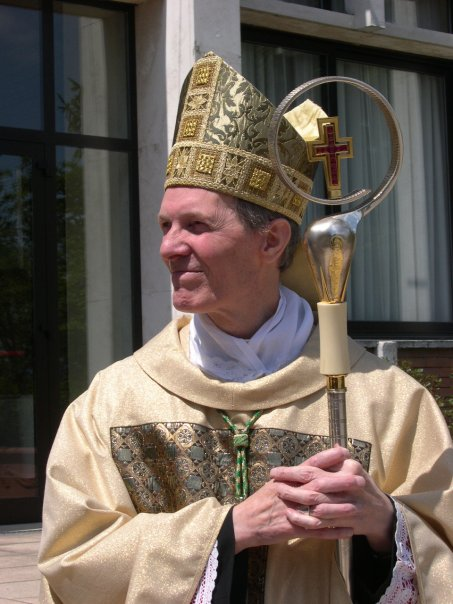
- Corti in 2009
- Church: Roman Catholic Church
- Diocese: Novara
- See: Novara
- Appointed: 19 December 1990
- Installed: 3 March 1991
- Term ended: 24 November 2011
- Predecessor: Aldo Del Monte
- Successor: Franco Giulio Brambilla
- Other post: Cardinal Priest of San Giovanni a Porta Latina (2016–2020)
- Previous posts: Auxiliary Bishop of Milan (1981–1990); Titular Bishop of Zallata (1981–1990)

Orders
- Ordination: 28 July 1959 by Giovanni Battista Montini
- Consecration: 6 June 1981 by Carlo Maria Martini
- Created cardinal: 19 November 2016 by Pope Francis
- Rank: Cardinal priest

Personal details
- Born: 1 March 1936 Galbiate, Kingdom of Italy
- Died: 12 May 2020 (aged 84) Rho, Italy
- Denomination: Roman Catholicism
- Motto: Cor ad cor loquitur ('Heart speaks to heart')

Ordination history of Renato Corti
History
Episcopal consecration
- Principal consecrator: Carlo Maria Martini
- Co-consecrators: Libero Tresoldi; Bernardo Citterio
Cardinalate
- Elevated by: Pope Francis
Episcopal succession
Bishops consecrated by Renato Corti as principal consecrator
- Germano Zaccheo: 16 September 1995

Styles of Renato Corti
- Reference style: His Eminence
- Spoken style: Your Eminence
- Religious style: Cardinal
- Informal style: Cardinal

Renato Corti (1 March 1936 – 12 May 2020) was an Italian cardinal and prelate of the Roman Catholic Church. He was Bishop of Novara from 1990 to 2011. Pope Francis raised Corti to the rank of cardinal on 19 November 2016.

== Early years ==
Renato Corti was born in Galbiate in the province of Lecco, part of the Archdiocese of Milan on 1 March 1936. He studied at the seminary in Milan and was ordained on 28 July 1959 by Cardinal Giovanni Battista Montini (later Pope Paul VI). His assignments included serving as parochial vicar of the Oratory of Caronno Pertusella from 1959 to 1967, spiritual director at the College of Gorla Minore from 1967 to 1969, and spiritual director of the archdiocesan seminary of Saronno from 1969 to 1977. He then became rector for theology at the seminary of Saronno. He became vicar general of the Milan Archdiocese in November 1980.

== Episcopacy ==
Pope John Paul II named him auxiliary bishop of the Archdiocese of Milan on 30 April 1981 and titular bishop of Zallata. He received episcopal ordination on 6 June 1981 from Archbishop Carlo Maria Martini, with Bishops Libero Tresoldi and Bernardo Citterio as co-consecrators. The same pope named him Bishop of Novara on 19 December 1990 to succeed Aldo Del Monte, and he was installed on 3 March 1991.

In November 2007, four months after Pope Benedict XVI issued new rules about the use of the 1962 Roman Missal (see Summorum Pontificum), three priests in the Novara diocese refused to celebrate Sunday Mass unless allowed to celebrate the Tridentine Mass exclusively. Corti suspended them.

While Bishop of Novara, he served terms as vice president of the Italian Bishops Conference (2000 to 2005) and vice president of the Regional Bishops Conference of Piedmont. He also held assignments in the Roman Curia as a member of the Congregation for the Oriental Churches and the Congregation for the Evangelization of Peoples.

Pope Benedict XVI accepted his resignation as bishop of Novara on 24 November 2011. In retirement, he continued to lead spiritual exercises for both religious and lay groups. He lived at Rho, near the college of the Oblates of St. Ambrose and St. Charles.

Corti was known for his work as a spiritual director. Pope John Paul II asked him to lead his Lenten retreat in 2005, and at the invitation of Pope Francis, he wrote the meditations used at the Stations of the Cross at Rome's Colosseum in 2015.

Pope Francis raised Corti to the rank of cardinal at a consistory held on 19 November 2016. He was given the rank of Cardinal-Priest and assigned the titular church of San Giovanni a Porta Latina.

== Death ==
Corti died in Rho at the age of 84 on 12 May 2020.

== Works ==
- Platovnjak, Ivan (2001). La direzione spirituale oggi: lo sviluppo della sua dottrina dal Vaticano II a Vita consecrata, 1962-1996. Roma: Pontificia università gregoriana. ISBN 88-7652-889-X. OCLC 47677772.
- Il miracolo sarebbe la santità. Meditazioni sul ministero sacerdotale (1999) ISBN 978-8838428289
- Corti, Renato (2003). Un giovane diventa cristiano: l'esperienza di sant'Agostino: lettera pastorale per l'anno 2003-2004. Milano: Paoline. ISBN 88-315-2536-0. OCLC 955560310.
- Corti, Renato (2005). La chiesa a servizio della nuova ed eterna alleanza : esercizi spirituali in Vaticano, 2005. Città del Vaticano: Libreria editrice vaticana. ISBN 88-209-7700-1. OCLC 60529003.
- Bianchi, Enzo (2004). La parrocchia. Corti, Renato. Magnano: Edizioni Qiqajon-Monastero di Bose. ISBN 88-8227-168-4. OCLC 971264023.
- Corti, Renato (2007). Rivestitevi di Cristo: la sorgente e l'alimento della maturità cristiana: lettera pastorale per l'anno 2007-2008. Milano: Paoline. ISBN 978-88-315-3360-7. OCLC 956001359.
- Corti, Renato (2008). Fate quello che egli vi dirà: vivere da cristiani nel mondo: lettera pastorale per l'anno 2008-2009. Milano: Paoline. ISBN 978-88-315-3537-3. OCLC 955176246.

Catholic Church titles
| Preceded by Aldo Del Monte | Bishop of Novara; 19 December 1990—24 November 2011 | Succeeded by Franco Giulio Brambilla |
| Preceded by Franciszek Macharski | Cardinal Priest of San Giovanni a Porta Latina; 19 November 2016—12 May 2020 | Succeeded by Adalberto Martínez Flores |
