= Galbiate =

Galbiate Galbiàa (Lombard)
- Comune
- Comune di Galbiate
- Location within Italy Location within Lombardy
- Coordinates: 45°48′N 9°23′E
- Country: Italy
- Region: Lombardy
- Province: Province of Lecco (LC)

Government
  - Mayor: Benedetto Negri

Area
  - Total: 16.1 km^{2} (6.2 sq mi)
- Elevation: 371 m (1,217 ft)

Population (29 February 2016) Lago di Annone is located on its borders.
  - Total: 8,521
  - Density: 529/km^{2} (1,370/sq mi)
- Demonym: Galbiatesi
- Time zone: UTC+1 (CET)
  - Summer (DST): UTC+2 (CEST)
- Postal code: 23851
- Dialing code: 0341
- Website: Official website

Galbiate (Brianzöö: Galbiàa) is a comune (municipality) in the Province of Lecco in the Italian region Lombardy, located about 40 kilometres (25 mi) northeast of Milan and about 6 kilometres (4 mi) south of Lecco.

Galbiate borders the following municipalities: Annone di Brianza, Civate, Colle Brianza, Ello, Garlate, Lecco, Malgrate, Oggiono, Olginate, Pescate, Valgreghentino, Valmadrera.

== Notable people ==
- Renato Corti (1936–2020), cardinal and prelate of the Catholic Church
