= Garlate =

Garlate Garlàa (Lombard)
- Comune
- Comune di Garlate
- Location within Italy Location within Lombardy
- Coordinates: 45°48′N 9°24′E
- Country: Italy
- Region: Lombardy
- Province: Province of Lecco (LC)

Area
  - Total: 2.1 km^{2} (0.81 sq mi)
- Elevation: 205 m (673 ft)

Population (Dec. 2004)
  - Total: 2,630
  - Density: 1,300/km^{2} (3,200/sq mi)
- Demonym: Garlatesi
- Time zone: UTC+1 (CET)
  - Summer (DST): UTC+2 (CEST)
- Postal code: 23852
- Dialing code: 0341
- Website: Official website

Garlate (Brianzöö: Garlàa) is a comune (municipality) in the Province of Lecco in the Italian region Lombardy, located about 40 kilometres (25 mi) northeast of Milan and about 6 kilometres (4 mi) south of Lecco. As of 31 December 2004, it had a population of 2,630 and an area of 2.1 square kilometres (0.81 mi^{2}).

Garlate borders the municipalities of Galbiate, Lecco, Olginate, Pescate, and Vercurago.

== Historical monuments ==
- St Stephen Church (Santo Stefano) - building of mediaeval origine, rebuilt in barocco, St. Stepan is celebrated every year as a patron saint of the city
- Silk Museum (Museo della setta) - situated in a former silk factory

== Demographic evolution ==
Historical population

Year	Pop.	±%
1861	678	—
1871	734	+8.3%
1881	807	+9.9%
1901	875	+8.4%
1911	944	+7.9%

Year	Pop.	±%
1921	914	−3.2%
1931	980	+7.2%
1936	952	−2.9%
1951	1,076	+13.0%
1961	1,288	+19.7%

Year	Pop.	±%
1971	1,719	+33.5%
1981	2,263	+31.6%
1991	2,453	+8.4%
2001	2,525	+2.9%

Source: Data from ISTAT
