= Barzago =

Barzago Barzàch (Lombard)
- Comune
- Comune di Barzago
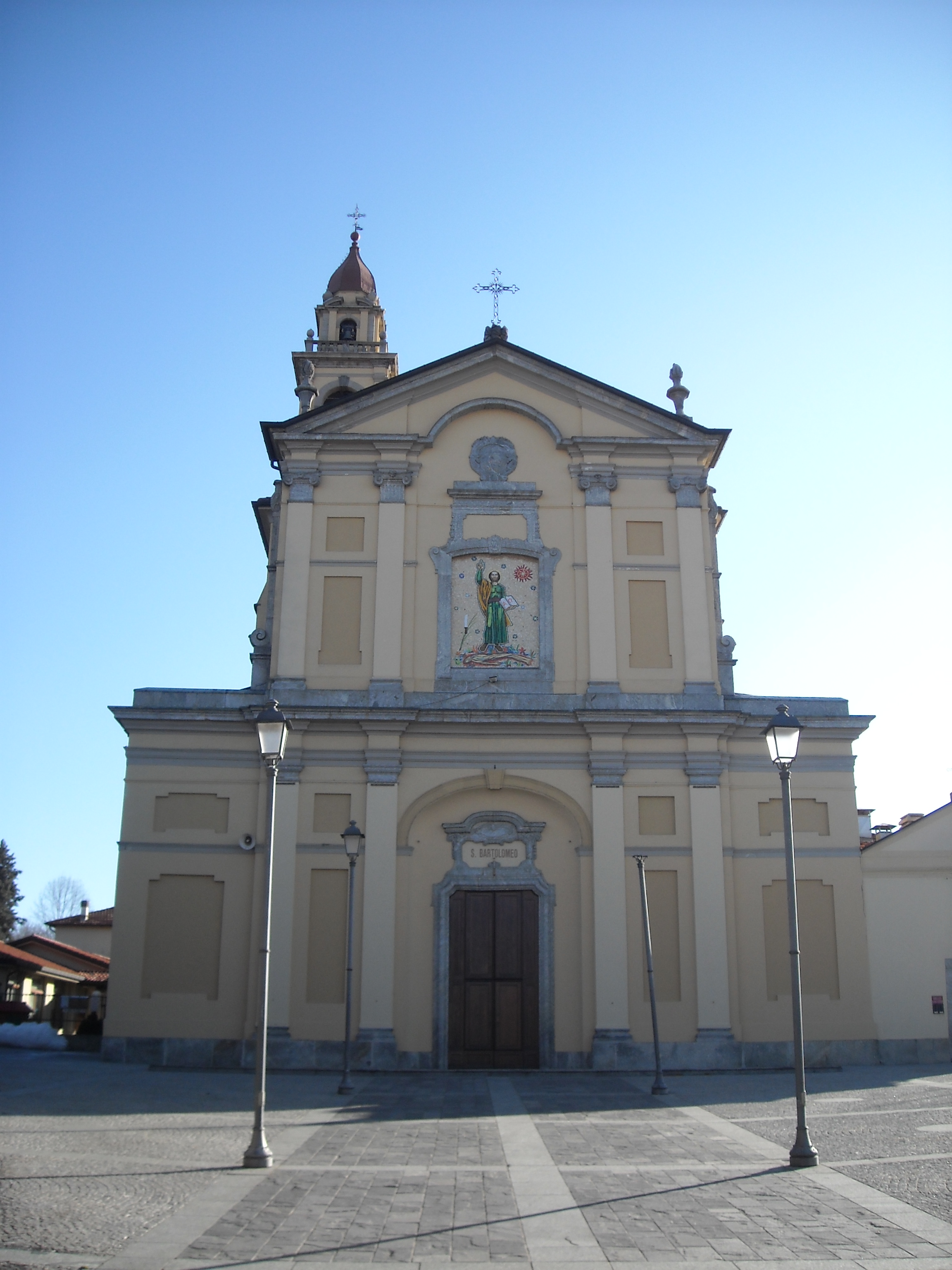
- Church of Saint Bartholomew

- Location within Italy Location within Lombardy
- Coordinates: 45°45′N 9°19′E
- Country: Italy
- Region: Lombardy
- Province: Lecco (LC)
- Frazioni: Bevera, Bevera di Sirtori, Verdegò

Government
  - Mayor: Mirko Ceroli

Area
  - Total: 3.6 km^{2} (1.4 sq mi)
- Elevation: 358 m (1,175 ft)

Population (1 January 2014)
  - Total: 2,505
  - Density: 700/km^{2} (1,800/sq mi)
- Demonym: Barzaghesi
- Time zone: UTC+1 (CET)
  - Summer (DST): UTC+2 (CEST)
- Postal code: 23890
- Dialing code: 031
- Website: Official website

Barzago (Brianzöö: Barzàch) is a comune (municipality) in the Province of Lecco in the Italian region Lombardy, located about 35 kilometres (22 mi) northeast of Milan and about 13 kilometres (8 mi) southwest of Lecco.

Barzago borders the following municipalities: Barzanò, Bulciago, Castello di Brianza, Cremella, Dolzago, Garbagnate Monastero, Sirone, Sirtori.
