= Cassago Brianza =

- Comune
- Comune di Cassago Brianza
- Location of Cassago Brianza in Italy Cassago Brianza (Lombardy)
- Coordinates: 45°44′N 9°17′E
- Country: Italy
- Region: Lombardy
- Province: Lecco (LC)

Government
  - Mayor: Rosaura Fumagalli

Area
  - Total: 3.6 km^{2} (1.4 sq mi)
- Elevation: 334 m (1,096 ft)

Population (31 May 2017)
  - Total: 4,374
  - Density: 1,200/km^{2} (3,100/sq mi)
- Demonym: Cassaghesi
- Time zone: UTC+1 (CET)
  - Summer (DST): UTC+2 (CEST)
- Postal code: 23893
- Dialing code: 039
- Website: Official website

Cassago Brianza (Brianzöö: Casàch) is a comune (municipality) in the Province of Lecco in the Italian region Lombardy, located about 30 kilometres (19 mi) northeast of Milan and about 15 kilometres (9 mi) southwest of Lecco. Part of the Brianza traditional region, it was formed in 1927 by the merger of the previous comuni of Cassago and Oriano Brianza.

Cassago Brianza borders the following municipalities: Barzanò, Bulciago, Cremella, Monticello Brianza, Nibionno, Renate, Veduggio con Colzano.

It is considered the place ("Rus Cassiciacum") where Saint Augustine spent the fall and winter before he was baptised.
