= Costa Masnaga =

- Comune
- Comune di Costa Masnaga
- Coat of arms

- Location within Italy Location within Lombardy
- Coordinates: 45°46′N 9°17′E
- Country: Italy
- Region: Lombardy
- Province: Lecco (LC)

Government
  - Mayor: Sabina Panzeri

Area
  - Total: 5.62 km^{2} (2.17 sq mi)
- Elevation: 318 m (1,043 ft)

Population (30 June 2017)
  - Total: 4,846
  - Density: 862/km^{2} (2,230/sq mi)
- Demonym: Costamasnaghesi
- Time zone: UTC+1 (CET)
  - Summer (DST): UTC+2 (CEST)
- Postal code: 23845
- Dialing code: 031
- Website: Official website

Costa Masnaga (Brianzöö: Masnàga) is a comune (municipality) in the Province of Lecco in the Italian region Lombardy, located about 35 kilometres (22 mi) northeast of Milan and about 13 kilometres (8 mi) southwest of Lecco.

Costa Masnaga borders the following municipalities: Bulciago, Garbagnate Monastero, Lambrugo, Merone, Molteno, Nibionno, Rogeno.

The municipality was created in 1789, by merging together the villages of Tregolo, Brenno Della Torre and Centemero under the same administrative unit.

== Sister towns ==
Costa Masnaga is twinned with Clonmel, Ireland
