= Santa Maria Hoè =

Santa Maria Hoè Santa Maria Uè (Lombard)
- Comune
- Comune di Santa Maria Hoè
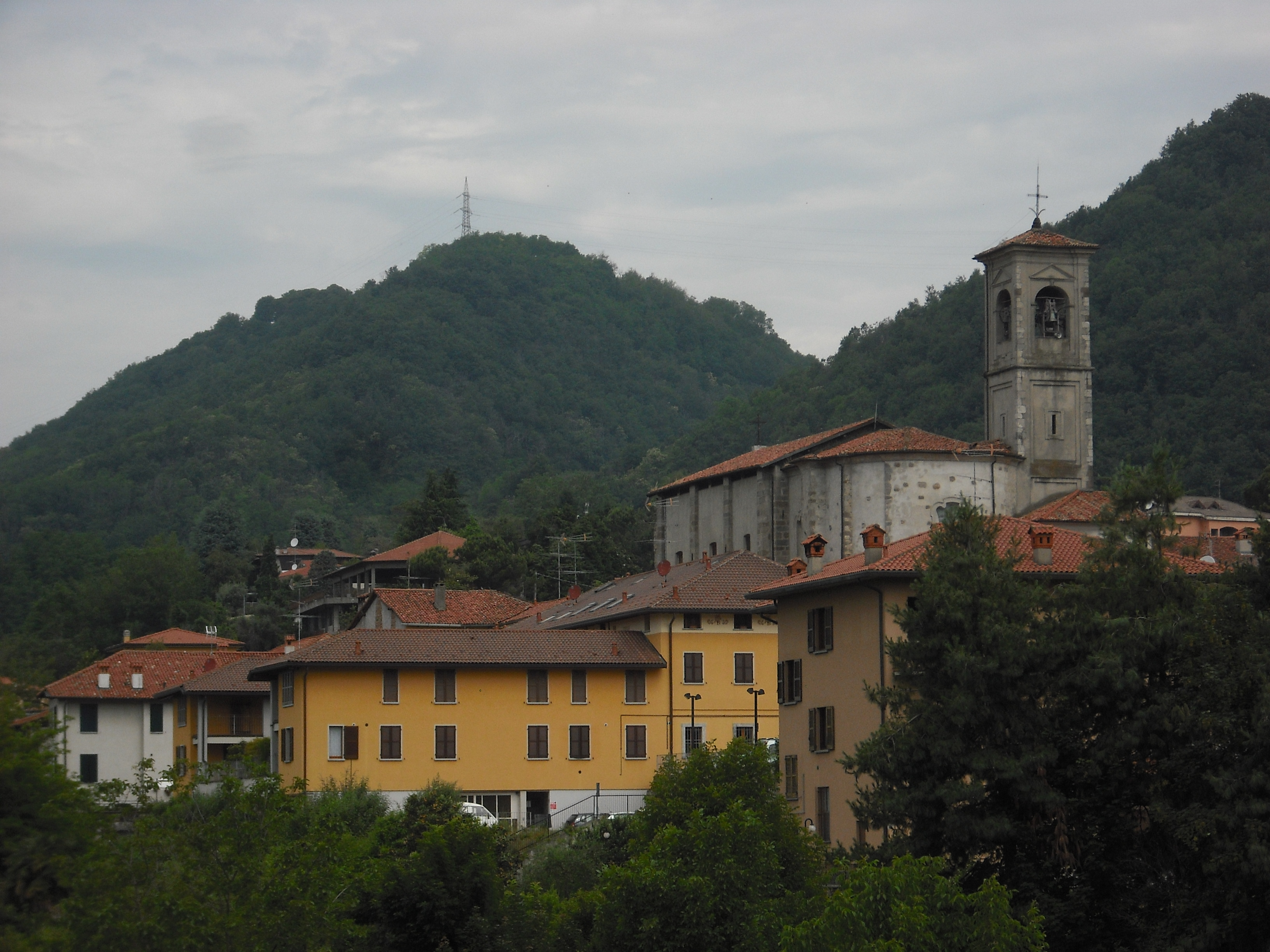
- Church

- Coat of arms

- Location within Italy Location within Lombardy
- Coordinates: 45°45′N 9°22′E
- Country: Italy
- Region: Lombardy
- Province: Province of Lecco (LC)

Area
  - Total: 2.8 km^{2} (1.1 sq mi)

Population (Dec. 2004)
  - Total: 2,140
  - Density: 760/km^{2} (2,000/sq mi)
- Time zone: UTC+1 (CET)
  - Summer (DST): UTC+2 (CEST)
- Postal code: 23889
- Dialing code: 039

Santa Maria Hoè (Brianzöö: Santa Maria Uè) is a comune (municipality) in the Province of Lecco in the Italian region Lombardy, located about 35 kilometres (22 mi) northeast of Milan and about 11 kilometres (7 mi) south of Lecco. As of 31 December 2004, it had a population of 2,140 and an area of 2.8 square kilometres (1.1 mi^{2}).

Santa Maria Hoè borders the following municipalities: Castello di Brianza, Colle Brianza, Olgiate Molgora, Rovagnate.

== Demographic evolution ==
Historical population

Year	Pop.	±%
1861	767	—
1871	846	+10.3%
1881	799	−5.6%
1901	1,017	+27.3%
1911	1,147	+12.8%

Year	Pop.	±%
1921	1,041	−9.2%
1931	1,019	−2.1%
1936	1,008	−1.1%
1951	1,133	+12.4%
1961	1,165	+2.8%

Year	Pop.	±%
1971	1,363	+17.0%
1981	1,566	+14.9%
1991	1,759	+12.3%
2001	1,995	+13.4%

Source: Data from ISTAT
