= Colle Brianza =

- Comune
- Comune di Colle Brianza
- Location of Colle Brianza in Italy Colle Brianza (Lombardy)
- Coordinates: 45°46′N 9°22′E
- Country: Italy
- Region: Lombardy
- Province: Lecco (LC)
- Frazioni: Nava, Cagliano, Giovenzana, Campsirago, Ravellino

Government
  - Mayor: Tiziana Galbusera

Area
  - Total: 8.4 km^{2} (3.2 sq mi)
- Elevation: 559 m (1,834 ft)

Population (1 January 2014)
  - Total: 1,750
  - Density: 210/km^{2} (540/sq mi)
- Demonym: Collesi
- Time zone: UTC+1 (CET)
  - Summer (DST): UTC+2 (CEST)
- Postal code: 22050
- Dialing code: 039
- Website: Official website

Colle Brianza (Brianzöö: Còl) is a comune (municipality) in the Province of Lecco in the Italian region Lombardy, located about 35 kilometres (22 mi) northeast of Milan and about 10 kilometres (6 mi) southwest of Lecco.

Colle Brianza borders the following municipalities: Airuno, Castello di Brianza, Dolzago, Ello, Galbiate, Olgiate Molgora, Santa Maria Hoè, Valgreghentino.
