= Rogeno =

Rogeno Rògen (Lombard)
- Comune
- Comune di Rogeno
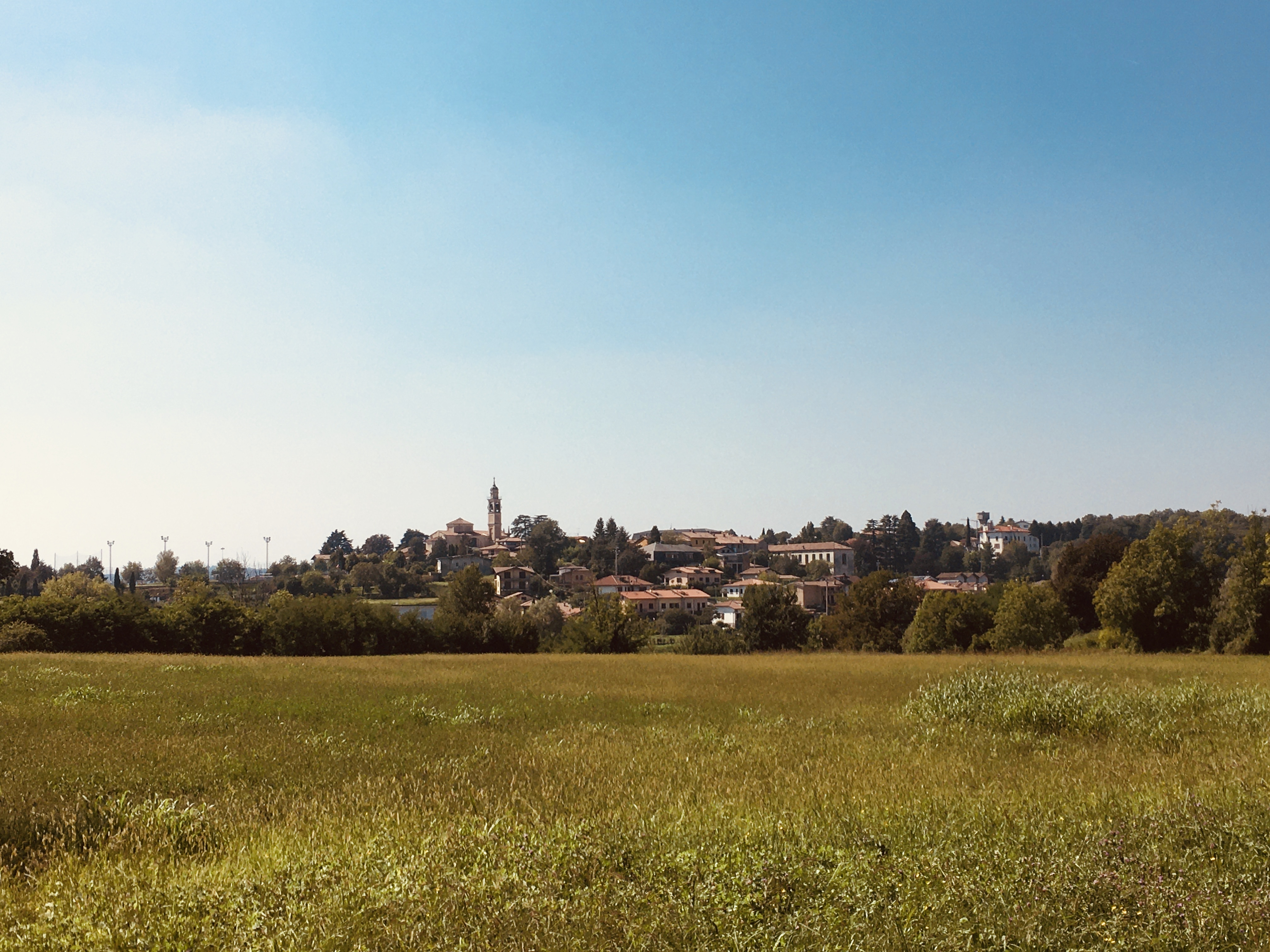

- Location within Italy Location within Lombardy
- Coordinates: 45°47′N 9°16′E
- Country: Italy
- Region: Lombardy
- Province: Lecco (LC)
- Frazioni: Casletto, Calvenzana, Maggiolino, Maglio

Government
  - Mayor: Antonio Martone

Area
  - Total: 4.8 km^{2} (1.9 sq mi)
- Elevation: 292 m (958 ft)

Population (31 December 2016)
  - Total: 3,149
  - Density: 660/km^{2} (1,700/sq mi)
- Demonym: Rogenesi
- Time zone: UTC+1 (CET)
  - Summer (DST): UTC+2 (CEST)
- Postal code: 23849
- Dialing code: 031
- Website: Official website

Rogeno (Brianzöö: Rògen) is a comune (municipality) in the Province of Lecco in the Italian region Lombardy, located about 35 kilometres (22 mi) north of Milan and about 13 kilometres (8 mi) southwest of Lecco.

Rogeno borders the following municipalities: Bosisio Parini, Costa Masnaga, Eupilio, Merone, Molteno.
