= Sirtori =

Sirtori Sìrtur (Lombard)
- Comune
- Comune di Sirtori
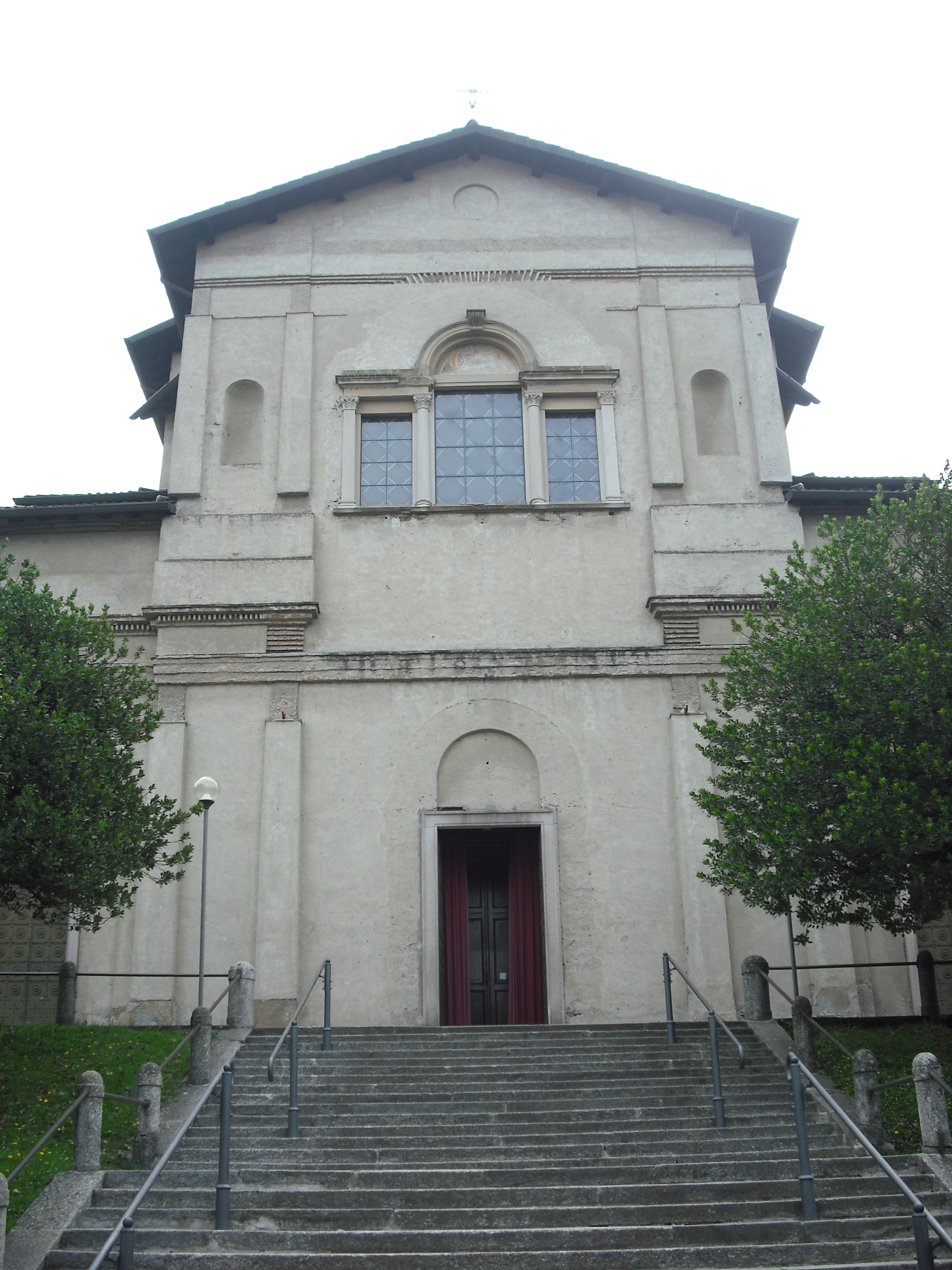
- Church

- Location within Italy Location within Lombardy
- Coordinates: 45°44′N 9°20′E
- Country: Italy
- Region: Lombardy
- Province: Province of Lecco (LC)
- Frazioni: Bevera di Sirtori

Area
  - Total: 4.3 km^{2} (1.7 sq mi)

Population (Dec. 2004)
  - Total: 2,844
  - Density: 660/km^{2} (1,700/sq mi)
- Demonym: Sirtoresi
- Time zone: UTC+1 (CET)
  - Summer (DST): UTC+2 (CEST)
- Postal code: 23896
- Dialing code: 039

Sirtori (Brianzöö: Sìrtur) is a comune (municipality) in the Province of Lecco in the Italian region Lombardy, located about 35 kilometres (22 mi) northeast of Milan and about 13 kilometres (8 mi) southwest of Lecco. As of 31 December 2004, it had a population of 2,844 and an area of 4.3 square kilometres (1.7 mi^{2}).

The municipality of Sirtori contains the frazione (subdivision) Bevera di Sirtori.

Sirtori borders the following municipalities: Barzago, Barzanò, Castello di Brianza, Missaglia, Perego, Rovagnate, Viganò.

== Demographic evolution ==
Historical population

Year	Pop.	±%
1861	898	—
1871	975	+8.6%
1881	1,058	+8.5%
1901	1,039	−1.8%
1911	1,160	+11.6%

Year	Pop.	±%
1921	1,256	+8.3%
1931	1,260	+0.3%
1936	1,228	−2.5%
1951	1,173	−4.5%
1961	1,282	+9.3%

Year	Pop.	±%
1971	1,722	+34.3%
1981	1,883	+9.3%
1991	2,379	+26.3%
2001	2,616	+10.0%

Source: Data from ISTAT
