= Bulciago =

Bulciago Bilciàch (Lombard)
- Comune
- Comune di Bulciago
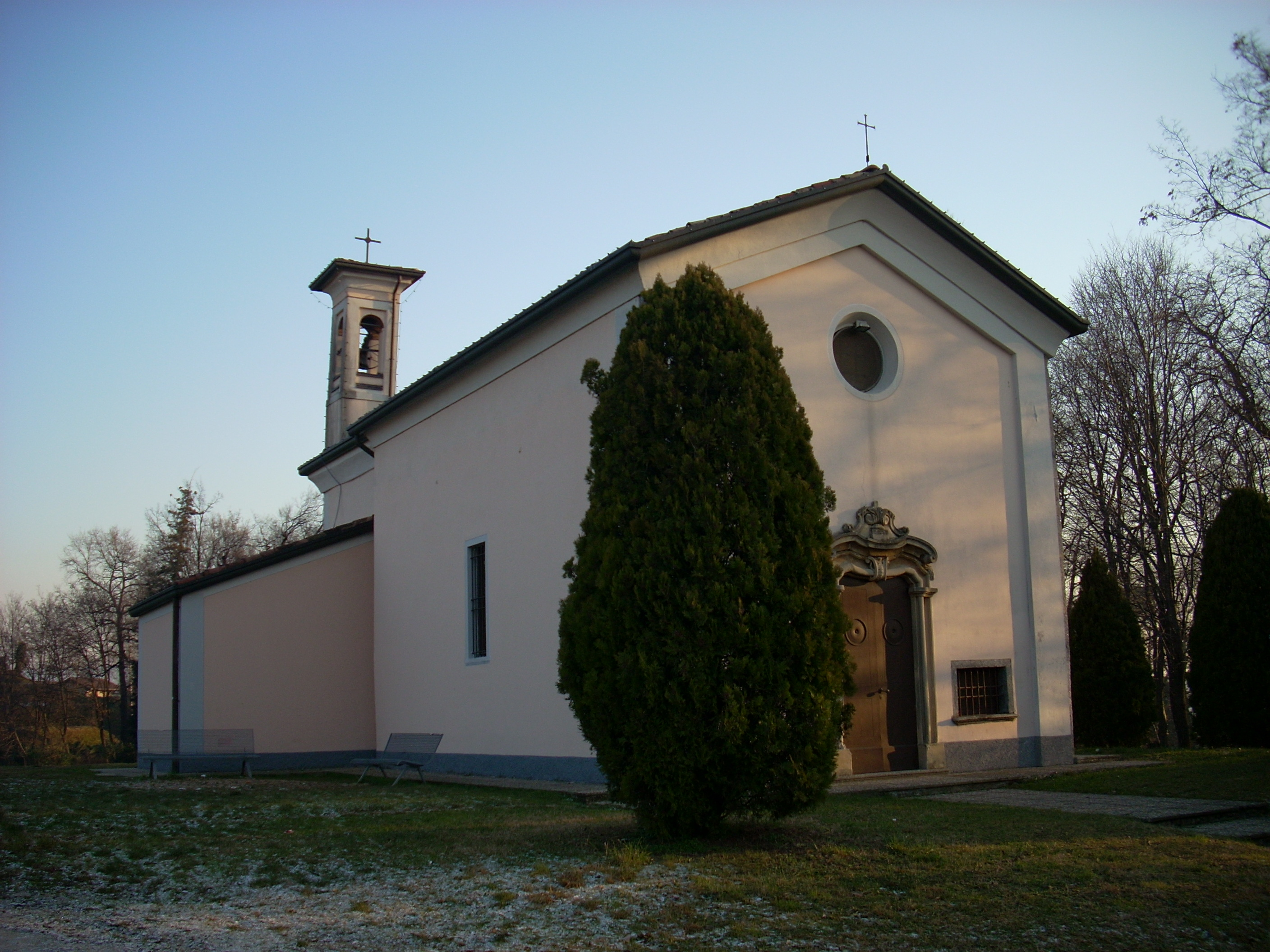
- Church of Saint Cosma and Damiano

- Location within Italy Location within Lombardy
- Coordinates: 45°45′N 9°17′E
- Country: Italy
- Region: Lombardy
- Province: Province of Lecco (LC)

Area
  - Total: 3.1 km^{2} (1.2 sq mi)

Population (Dec. 2004)
  - Total: 2,811
  - Density: 910/km^{2} (2,300/sq mi)
- Time zone: UTC+1 (CET)
  - Summer (DST): UTC+2 (CEST)
- Postal code: 23892
- Dialing code: 031

Bulciago (Brianzöö: Bilciàch) is a comune (municipality) in the Province of Lecco in the Italian region Lombardy, located about 35 kilometres (22 mi) northeast of Milan and about 14 kilometres (9 mi) southwest of Lecco. As of 31 December 2004, it had a population of 2,811 in an area of 3.1 square kilometres (1.2 mi^{2}).

Bulciago borders the following municipalities: Barzago, Cassago Brianza, Costa Masnaga, Cremella, Garbagnate Monastero, Nibionno.

== History ==
Its name seems to derive from a Bubulcius, which means "land of Bubulcio", perhaps a Roman leader.

Gallic-Roman and Longobard tombs were found in Bulciago.

The Bulciago's citizen Eligio Panzeri took part in the Expedition of the Thousand.

== Demographic evolution ==
Historical population

Year	Pop.	±%
1861	855	—
1871	967	+13.1%
1881	999	+3.3%
1901	1,273	+27.4%
1911	1,431	+12.4%

Year	Pop.	±%
1921	1,484	+3.7%
1931	1,621	+9.2%
1936	1,664	+2.7%
1951	1,773	+6.6%
1961	1,947	+9.8%

Year	Pop.	±%
1971	2,448	+25.7%
1981	2,326	−5.0%
1991	2,610	+12.2%
2001	2,733	+4.7%

Source: Data from ISTAT

== Sports ==
The Polisportiva Oratorio Bulciago is an amateur sports association with Christian inspiration, founded in 2000 through the merger of the Polisportiva Bulciago and the Gruppo Sportivo Oratorio Bulciago. Since July 1, 2011, the association has managed the entire municipal sports center of Bulciago, which includes the sports hall and the football field. In 2011, following the closure of the G.S. Real Bulciago, the association allowed athletes who had previously been part of the other local football club to join, becoming the main reference for anyone wanting to practice sports in Bulciago.

== Famous citizens ==
- Vittorio Arrigoni, Italian journalist, activist and writer
