= Sirone =

Sirone Sirònn (Lombard)
- Comune
- Comune di Sirone
- Location within Italy Location within Lombardy
- Coordinates: 45°46′N 9°19′E
- Country: Italy
- Region: Lombardy
- Province: Province of Lecco (LC)
- Frazioni: San Benedetto, Rettola

Area
  - Total: 3.2 km^{2} (1.2 sq mi)
- Elevation: 280 m (920 ft)

Population (Dec. 2004)
  - Total: 2,270
  - Density: 710/km^{2} (1,800/sq mi)
- Demonym: Sironesi
- Time zone: UTC+1 (CET)
  - Summer (DST): UTC+2 (CEST)
- Postal code: 23844
- Dialing code: 031
- Website: Official website

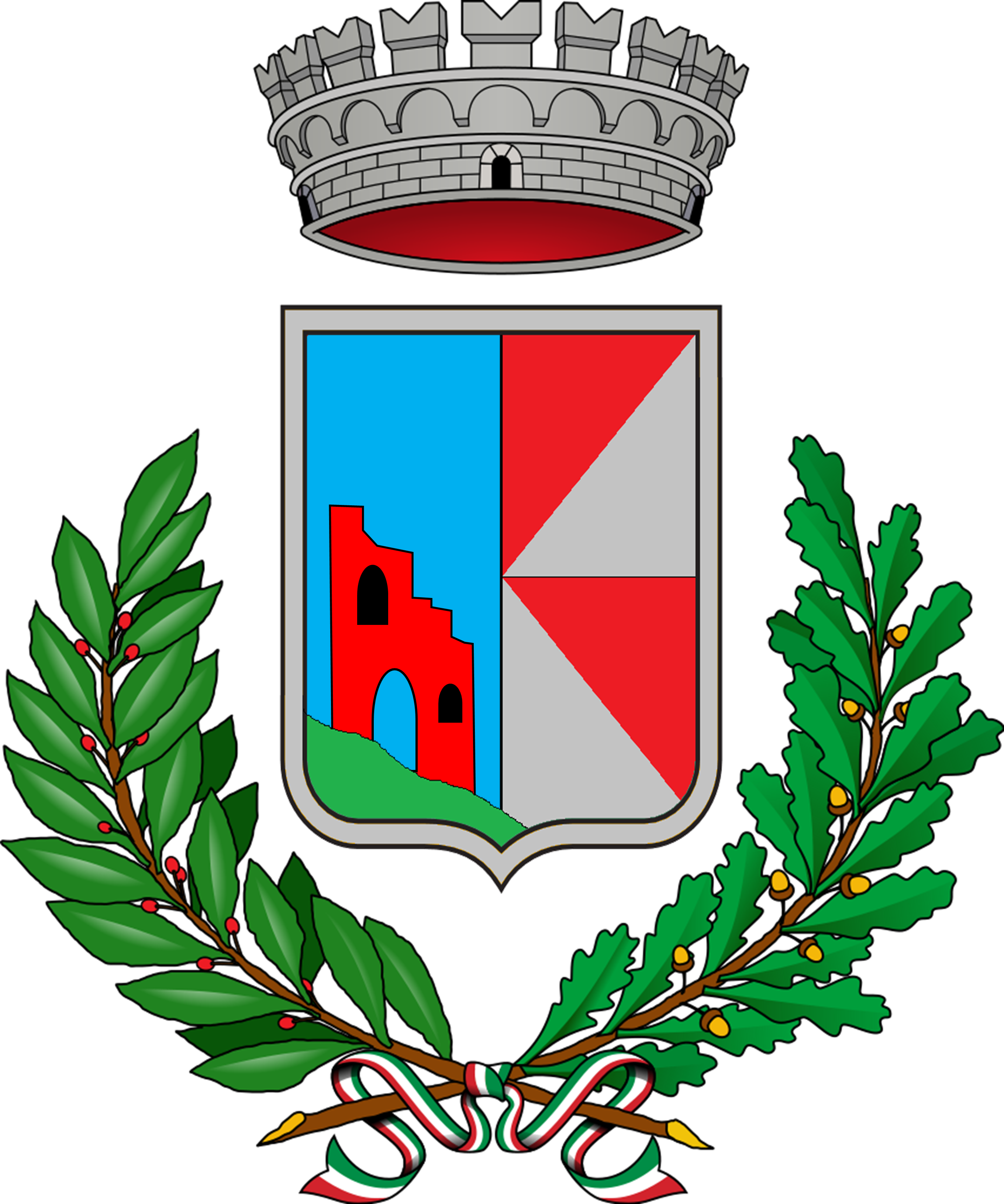
Sirone coat of arms

Sirone (Brianzöö: Sirònn) is a comune (municipality) in the Province of Lecco in the Italian region Lombardy, located about 35 kilometres (22 mi) northeast of Milan and about 11 kilometres (7 mi) southwest of Lecco. As of 31 December 2004, it had a population of 2,270 and an area of 3.2 square kilometres (1.2 mi^{2}).

The municipality of Sirone contains the frazione of San Benedetto.

Sirone borders the following municipalities: Barzago, Dolzago, Garbagnate Monastero, Molteno, Oggiono.

== Demographic evolution ==
Historical population

| Year | Pop. | ±% |
|---|---|---|
| 1861 | 1,221 | — |
| 1871 | 1,267 | +3.8% |
| 1881 | 1,315 | +3.8% |
| 1901 | 1,366 | +3.9% |
| 1911 | 1,467 | +7.4% |

| Year | Pop. | ±% |
|---|---|---|
| 1921 | 1,445 | −1.5% |
| 1931 | 1,405 | −2.8% |
| 1936 | 1,383 | −1.6% |
| 1951 | 1,366 | −1.2% |
| 1961 | 1,299 | −4.9% |

| Year | Pop. | ±% |
|---|---|---|
| 1971 | 1,477 | +13.7% |
| 1981 | 1,986 | +34.5% |
| 1991 | 2,170 | +9.3% |
| 2001 | 2,200 | +1.4% |

Source: Data from ISTAT
