= Ello =

Ello Ell (Lombard)
- Comune
- Comune di Ello
- Location of Ello in Italy Ello (Lombardy)
- Coordinates: 45°47′N 9°22′E
- Country: Italy
- Region: Lombardy
- Province: Province of Lecco (LC)

Area
  - Total: 2.4 km^{2} (0.93 sq mi)

Population (Dec. 2004)
  - Total: 1,202
  - Density: 500/km^{2} (1,300/sq mi)
- Time zone: UTC+1 (CET)
  - Summer (DST): UTC+2 (CEST)
- Postal code: 22040
- Dialing code: 0341
- Website: Official website

Ello (Brianzöö: Ell) is a comune (municipality) in the Province of Lecco in the Italian region Lombardy, located about 40 kilometres (25 mi) northeast of Milan and about 8 kilometres (5 mi) southwest of Lecco. As of 31 December 2004, it had a population of 1,202 and an area of 2.4 square kilometres (0.93 mi^{2}).

Ello borders the following municipalities: Colle Brianza, Dolzago, Galbiate, Oggiono.

== Demographic evolution ==
Historical population

Year	Pop.	±%
1861	755	—
1871	775	+2.6%
1881	820	+5.8%
1901	752	−8.3%
1911	801	+6.5%

Year	Pop.	±%
1921	850	+6.1%
1931	780	−8.2%
1936	719	−7.8%
1951	742	+3.2%
1961	716	−3.5%

Year	Pop.	±%
1971	607	−15.2%
1981	709	+16.8%
1991	901	+27.1%
2001	1,110	+23.2%

Source: Data from ISTAT
