= Castello di Brianza =

- Comune
- Comune di Castello di Brianza
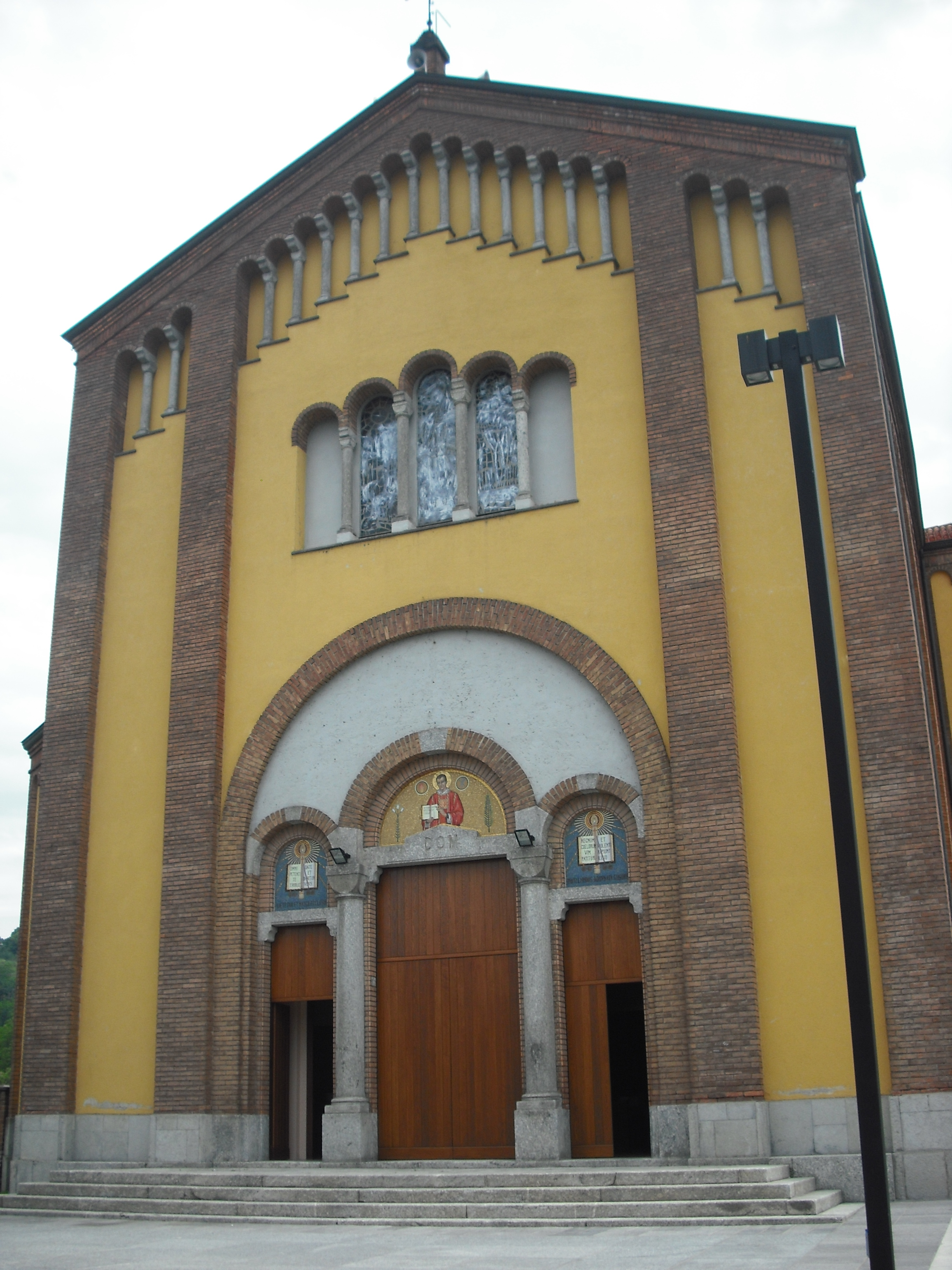
- Parish church.

- Coat of arms

- Location within Italy Location within Lombardy
- Coordinates: 45°46′N 9°20′E
- Country: Italy
- Region: Lombardy
- Province: Lecco (LC)

Government
  - Mayor: Aldo Riva

Area
  - Total: 3.6 km^{2} (1.4 sq mi)
- Elevation: 394 m (1,293 ft)

Population (1 January 2014)
  - Total: 2,568
  - Density: 710/km^{2} (1,800/sq mi)
- Demonym: Brianzollesi
- Time zone: UTC+1 (CET)
  - Summer (DST): UTC+2 (CEST)
- Postal code: 22040
- Dialing code: 039
- Website: Official website

Castello di Brianza (Brianzöö: Castél) is a comune (municipality) in the Province of Lecco in the Italian region Lombardy, located about 35 kilometres (22 mi) northeast of Milan and about 11 kilometres (7 mi) southwest of Lecco.

Castello di Brianza borders the following municipalities: Barzago, Colle Brianza, Dolzago, Rovagnate, Santa Maria Hoè, Sirtori.
