= Airuno =

Airuno Irün (Lombard)
- Comune
- Comune di Airuno
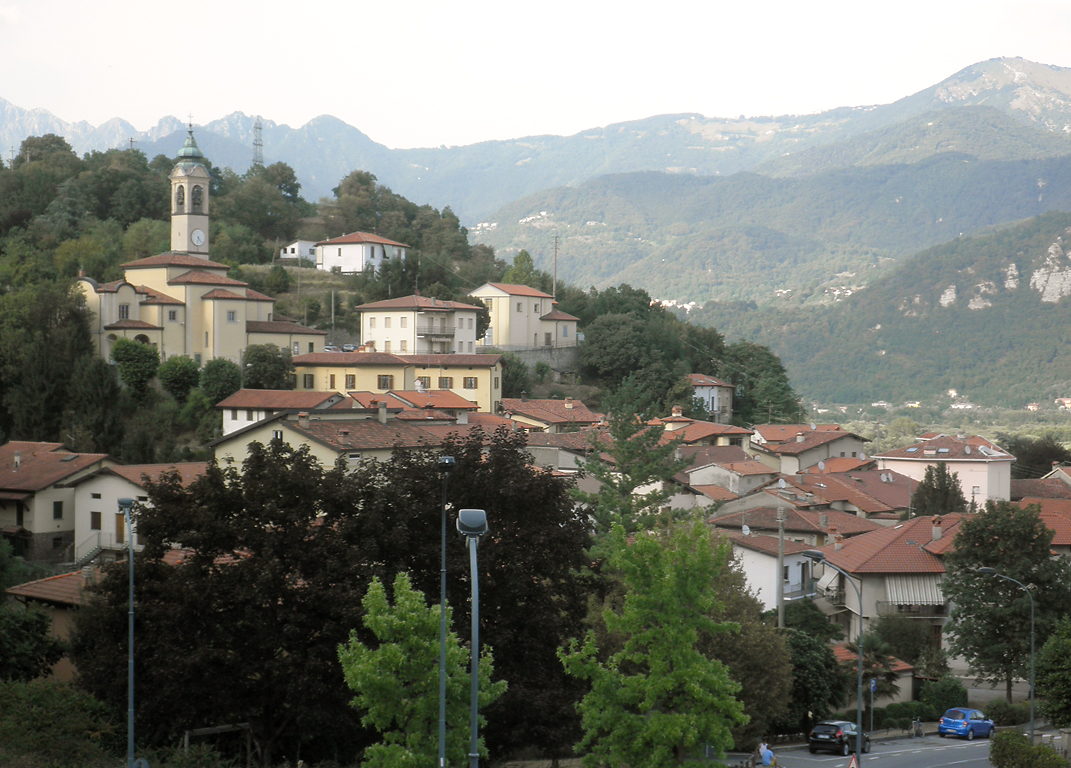
- View of Airuno

- Location of Airuno in Italy Airuno (Lombardy)
- Coordinates: 45°45′N 9°25′E
- Country: Italy
- Region: Lombardy
- Province: Province of Lecco (LC)

Area
  - Total: 4.3 km^{2} (1.7 sq mi)
- Elevation: 222 m (728 ft)

Population (Dec. 2004)
  - Total: 2,749
  - Density: 640/km^{2} (1,700/sq mi)
- Time zone: UTC+1 (CET)
  - Summer (DST): UTC+2 (CEST)
- Postal code: 22050
- Dialing code: 039

Airuno (Brianzöö: Irün) is a comune (municipality) in the Province of Lecco in the Italian region Lombardy, located about 35 kilometres (22 mi) northeast of Milan and about 11 kilometres (7 mi) south of Lecco. As of 31 December 2004, it had a population of 2,749 and an area of 4.3 square kilometres (1.7 mi^{2}).

Airuno borders the following municipalities: Brivio, Colle Brianza, Olgiate Molgora, Olginate, Valgreghentino. It is served by Airuno railway station.

== History ==
The presence of a settlement in Roman times is evidenced by the discovery of a lanceolate funerary stele, with Latin inscriptions, dating back to the late Roman period that came to light during excavations at the current Via Postale Vecchia. From Airuno, in Roman times, passed the Via Spluga, a Roman road that connected Milan with Lindau passing by the Spluga Pass.

It is mentioned in the will, dating back to 960, of a Lombard nobleman named Alcherio, resident in the Fortress of Airuno; watchtower at the time of the Romans, it was transformed by the Lombards into a fortified castle.

During the struggles that saw the Serenissima and the Duchy of Milan opposing each other for the control of the Colle di Brianza between 1447 and 1450, the fortress of Airuno was the operative base of Francesco Sforza, who at the end of the conflict obtained the lordship over the country and granted privileges and exemptions to the inhabitants. Where the fortress once stood, now stands the Sanctuary of the Madonna.

During the Spanish domination of the Duchy of Milan, in 1652 the governor Luigi de Benavides granted Airuno the ransom from the fiefdom.

== Demographics ==
Historical population

Year	Pop.	±%
1861	830	—
1871	884	+6.5%
1881	920	+4.1%
1901	938	+2.0%
1911	1,075	+14.6%

Year	Pop.	±%
1921	1,046	−2.7%
1931	1,189	+13.7%
1936	1,243	+4.5%
1951	1,410	+13.4%
1961	1,690	+19.9%

Year	Pop.	±%
1971	2,197	+30.0%
1981	2,532	+15.2%
1991	2,581	+1.9%
2001	2,610	+1.1%

Source: Data from ISTAT
