= Valgreghentino =

- Comune
- Comune di Valgreghentino
- Location within Italy Location within Lombardy
- Coordinates: 45°47′N 9°25′E
- Country: Italy
- Region: Lombardy
- Province: Lecco (LC)
- Frazioni: Biglio, Dozio, Parzanella, Villa San Carlo, Buttello, Cà Nova, Miglianico, Taiello.

Government
  - Mayor: Sergio Brambilla

Area
  - Total: 6.3 km^{2} (2.4 sq mi)
- Elevation: 304 m (997 ft)

Population (30 September 2012)
  - Total: 3,431
  - Density: 540/km^{2} (1,400/sq mi)
- Demonym: Valgreghentinesi
- Time zone: UTC+1 (CET)
  - Summer (DST): UTC+2 (CEST)
- Postal code: 23857
- Dialing code: 0341
- Patron saint: St. George
- Saint day: 23 April
- Website: Official website

Valgreghentino (Brianzöö: Carghentin) is a comune (municipality) in the Province of Lecco in the Italian region Lombardy, located about 40 kilometres (25 mi) northeast of Milan and about 8 kilometres (5 mi) south of Lecco.

Valgreghentino borders the following municipalities: Airuno, Colle Brianza, Galbiate, Olginate.

== Twin towns ==
Valgreghentino is twinned with:

- Saint-Rémy-en-Rollat, France
