= Barzanò =

Barzanò Barzenò (Lombard)
- Comune
- Comune di Barzanò
- Coat of arms

- Location of Barzanò in Italy Barzanò (Lombardy)
- Coordinates: 45°44′N 9°19′E
- Country: Italy
- Region: Lombardy
- Province: Lecco (LC)
- Frazioni: Dagò, San Feriolo, Torricella, Villanova

Government
  - Mayor: Giancarlo Aldeghi

Area
  - Total: 3.6 km^{2} (1.4 sq mi)
- Elevation: 365 m (1,198 ft)

Population (30 April 2017)
  - Total: 5,124
  - Density: 1,400/km^{2} (3,700/sq mi)
- Demonym: Barzanesi
- Time zone: UTC+1 (CET)
  - Summer (DST): UTC+2 (CEST)
- Postal code: 23891
- Dialing code: 039
- Website: Official website

Barzanò (Brianzöö: Barzenò) is a comune (municipality) in the Province of Lecco in the Italian region Lombardy, located about 30 kilometres (19 mi) northeast of Milan and about 14 kilometres (9 mi) southwest of Lecco.

Barzanò borders the following municipalities: Barzago, Cassago Brianza, Cremella, Monticello Brianza, Sirtori, Viganò.

== Sports ==
The Associazione Sportiva Dilettantistica Oratorio Barzanò, commonly known as ASD O. Barzanò, is an amateur football club founded in 1973 in Barzanò
