= Oggiono =

Oggiono Ugiòn (Lombard)
- Comune
- Comune di Oggiono
- Location within Italy Location within Lombardy
- Coordinates: 45°47′N 9°21′E
- Country: Italy
- Region: Lombardy
- Province: Province of Lecco (LC)
- Frazioni: Bagnolo, Imberido, Laguccio, Miravalle, Peslago

Area
  - Total: 7.9 km^{2} (3.1 sq mi)
- Elevation: 268 m (879 ft)

Population (Dec. 2026)
  - Total: 9,218
  - Density: 1,200/km^{2} (3,000/sq mi)
- Demonym: Oggionesi
- Time zone: UTC+1 (CET)
  - Summer (DST): UTC+2 (CEST)
- Postal code: 23848
- Dialing code: 0341
- Website: Official website

Oggiono (Brianzöö: Ugiòn) is a comune (municipality) in the Province of Lecco in the Italian region Lombardy, located about 40 kilometres (25 mi) northeast of Milan and about 8 kilometres (5 mi) southwest of Lecco.

As of 31 December 2004, it had a population of 8,194 and an area of 7.9 square kilometres (3.1 mi^{2}).

The municipality of Oggiono contains the frazioni (subdivisions, mainly villages and hamlets) Bagnolo, Imberido, Laguccio, Miravalle and Peslago.

Oggiono borders the following municipalities: Annone di Brianza, Dolzago, Ello, Galbiate, Molteno and Sirone.

Lago di Annone is located on its borders.

It was the eponymous birthplace of the renaissance painter Marco d'Oggiono, a chief pupil of Leonardo da Vinci.

== Demographic evolution ==
Historical population

Year	Pop.	±%
1861	3,329	—
1871	3,524	+5.9%
1881	3,792	+7.6%
1901	4,112	+8.4%
1911	4,267	+3.8%

Year	Pop.	±%
1921	4,161	−2.5%
1931	4,519	+8.6%
1936	4,398	−2.7%
1951	5,236	+19.1%
1961	5,691	+8.7%

Year	Pop.	±%
1971	6,671	+17.2%
1981	7,365	+10.4%
1991	7,334	−0.4%
2001	7,960	+8.5%

Source: Data from ISTAT

== Twin towns ==
Oggiono is twinned with:

- Leisnig, Germany
- Halásztelek, Hungary
