= Dolzago =

Dolzago Dolzagh (Lombard)
- Comune
- Comune di Dolzago
- Location within Italy Location within Lombardy
- Coordinates: 45°46′N 9°20′E
- Country: Italy
- Region: Lombardy
- Province: Province of Lecco (LC)

Area
  - Total: 2.2 km^{2} (0.85 sq mi)

Population (Dec. 2004)
  - Total: 2,126
  - Density: 970/km^{2} (2,500/sq mi)
- Time zone: UTC+1 (CET)
  - Summer (DST): UTC+2 (CEST)
- Postal code: 22042
- Dialing code: 0341
- Website: Official website

Dolzago (Brianzöö: Dolzagh [dulˈtsaːk]) is a comune (municipality) in the Province of Lecco in the Italian region Lombardy, located about 35 kilometres (22 mi) northeast of Milan and about 11 kilometres (6.8 mi) southwest of Lecco. As of 31 December 2004, it had a population of 2,126 and an area of 2.2 square kilometres (0.85 mi^{2}).

Dolzago borders the following municipalities: Barzago, Castello di Brianza, Colle Brianza, Ello, Oggiono, Sirone.

== Demographic evolution ==
Historical population

Year	Pop.	±%
1861	806	—
1871	853	+5.8%
1881	937	+9.8%
1901	1,025	+9.4%
1911	1,016	−0.9%

Year	Pop.	±%
1921	1,011	−0.5%
1931	1,073	+6.1%
1936	1,068	−0.5%
1951	1,133	+6.1%
1961	1,279	+12.9%

Year	Pop.	±%
1971	1,740	+36.0%
1981	1,881	+8.1%
1991	1,898	+0.9%
2001	2,103	+10.8%

Source: Data from ISTAT
