= Vercurago =

Vercurago Vercürach
- Comune
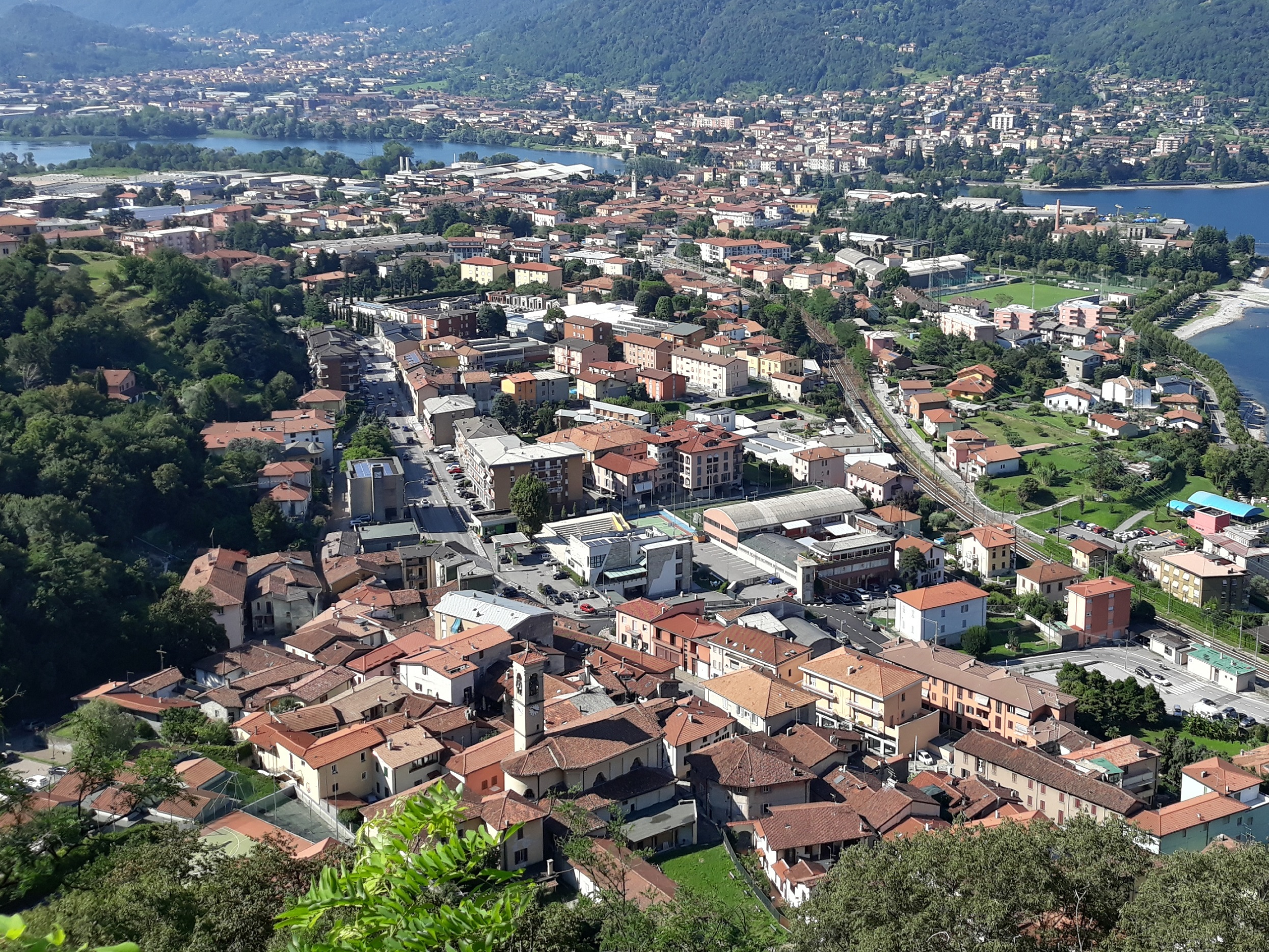
- Views on Vercurago

- Flag Seal

- Location within Lombardy Location within Italy
- Coordinates: 45°49′0″N 9°25′0″E
- Sovereign State: Italy
- Region: Lombardy
- Province: Province of Lecco
- Settled by Longobards: 814 as Vercoriaco
- Frazioni: Somasca

Government
  - Type: Mayor-council government
  - Mayor: Carlo Greppi (Ind.)

Area
  - Total: 2.12 km^{2} (0.82 sq mi)
- Elevation: 225 m (738 ft)

Population (31 May 2018)
  - Total: 2,817
  - Density: 1,325/km^{2} (3,430/sq mi)
- Demonym: Vercuraghesi
- Time zone: UTC+1 (CET)
  - Summer (DST): UTC+2 (CEST)
- Postcode (CAP): 23808
- Area code: 0341
- Vehicle registration: LC
- Land registry code: L751
- Patron saint: San Gerolamo Emiliani, Saints Gervasius and Protasius
- Festivity day: 8 February

Vercurago (Bergamasque: Vercürach) is a comune (municipality) in the Province of Lecco in the Italian region Lombardy, located about 45 kilometres (28 mi) northeast of Milan and about 4 kilometres (2 mi) southeast of Lecco. Vercurago borders the following municipalities: Calolziocorte, Erve, Garlate, Lecco, Olginate.

== Main sights ==
In Vercurago lies the Castle of the Francesco Bernardino Visconti, the Unnamed of Alessandro Manzoni's novel The Betrothed, a powerful lord to whom the main villain, Don Rodrigo, turns to abduct the heroine Lucia.

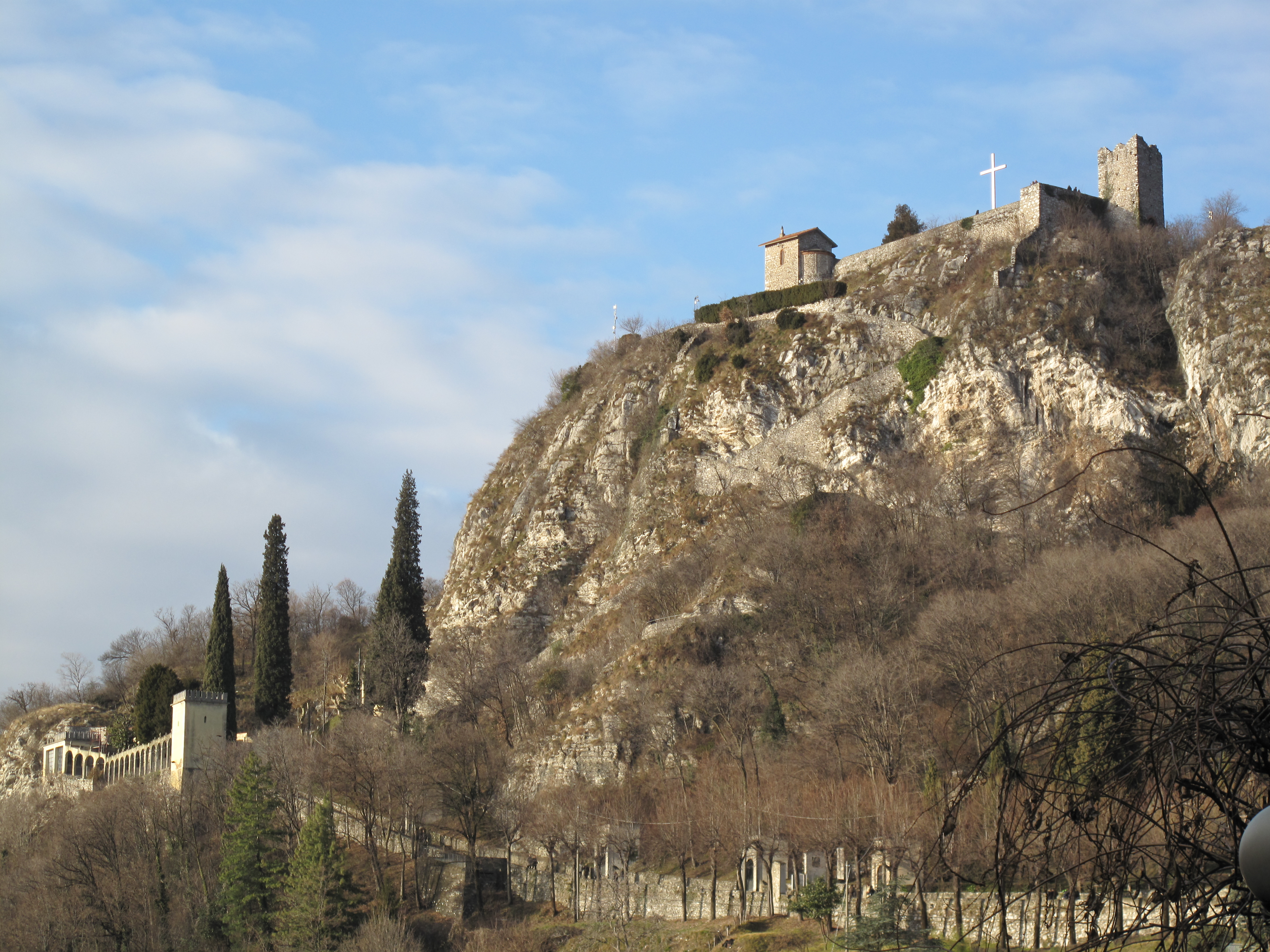
The castle of the Unnamed
