= Pescate =

Pescate Pescàa (Lombard)
- Comune
- Comune di Pescate
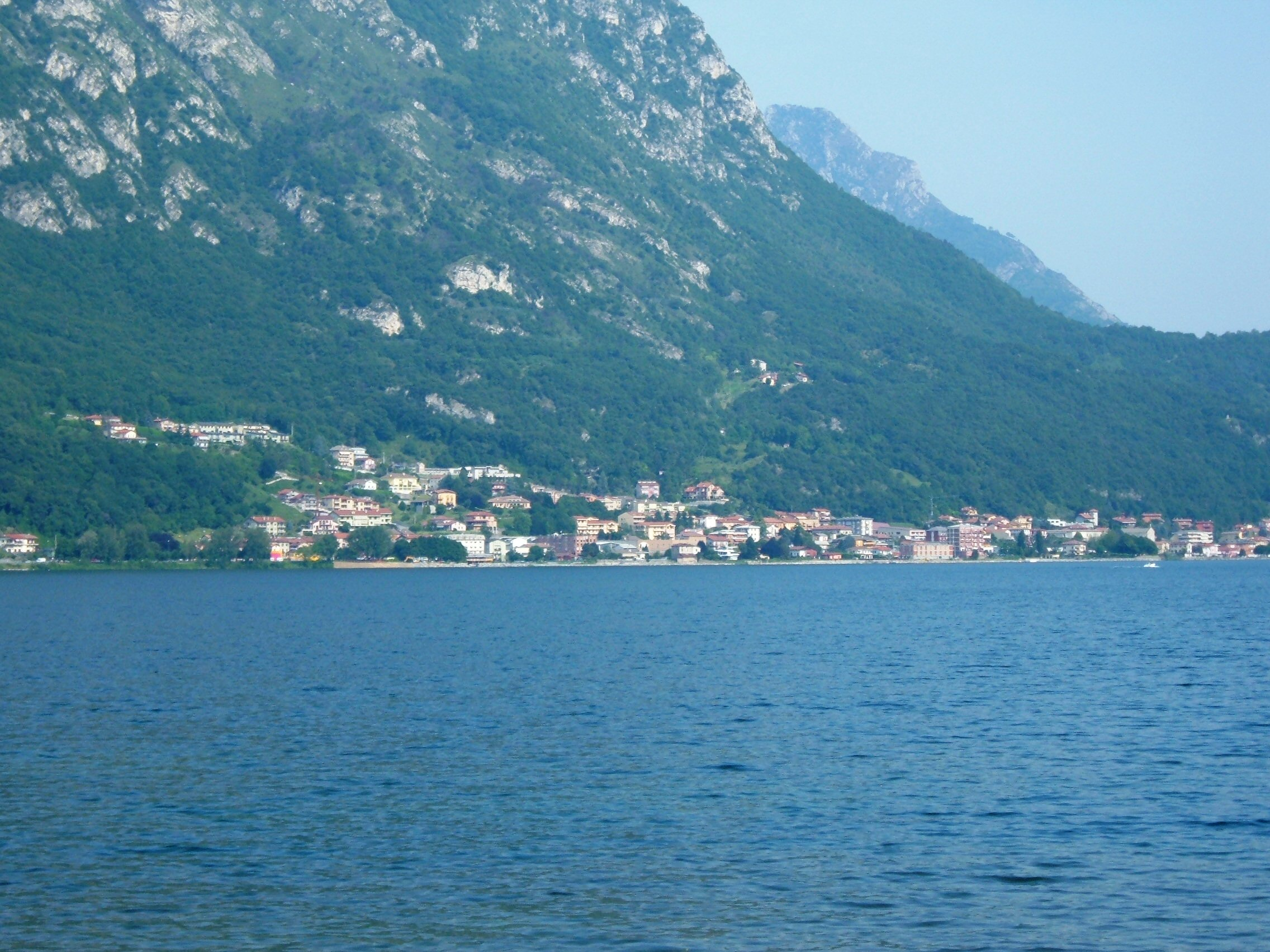
- Pescate

- Location within Italy Location within Lombardy
- Coordinates: 45°50′N 9°24′E
- Country: Italy
- Region: Lombardy
- Province: Province of Lecco (LC)
- Frazioni: Pescalina, Insirano, Torrette Inferiori, Torrette Superiori

Area
  - Total: 2.1 km^{2} (0.81 sq mi)

Population (Dec. 2004)
  - Total: 2,120
  - Density: 1,000/km^{2} (2,600/sq mi)
- Demonym: Pescatesi
- Time zone: UTC+1 (CET)
  - Summer (DST): UTC+2 (CEST)
- Postal code: 23855
- Dialing code: 0341
- Website: Official website

Pescate (Lecchese: Pescàa) is a comune (municipality) in the Province of Lecco in the Italian region Lombardy, located about 45 kilometres (28 mi) northeast of Milan and about 2 kilometres (1 mi) south of Lecco. As of 31 December 2004, it had a population of 2,120 and an area of 2.1 square kilometres (0.81 mi^{2}).

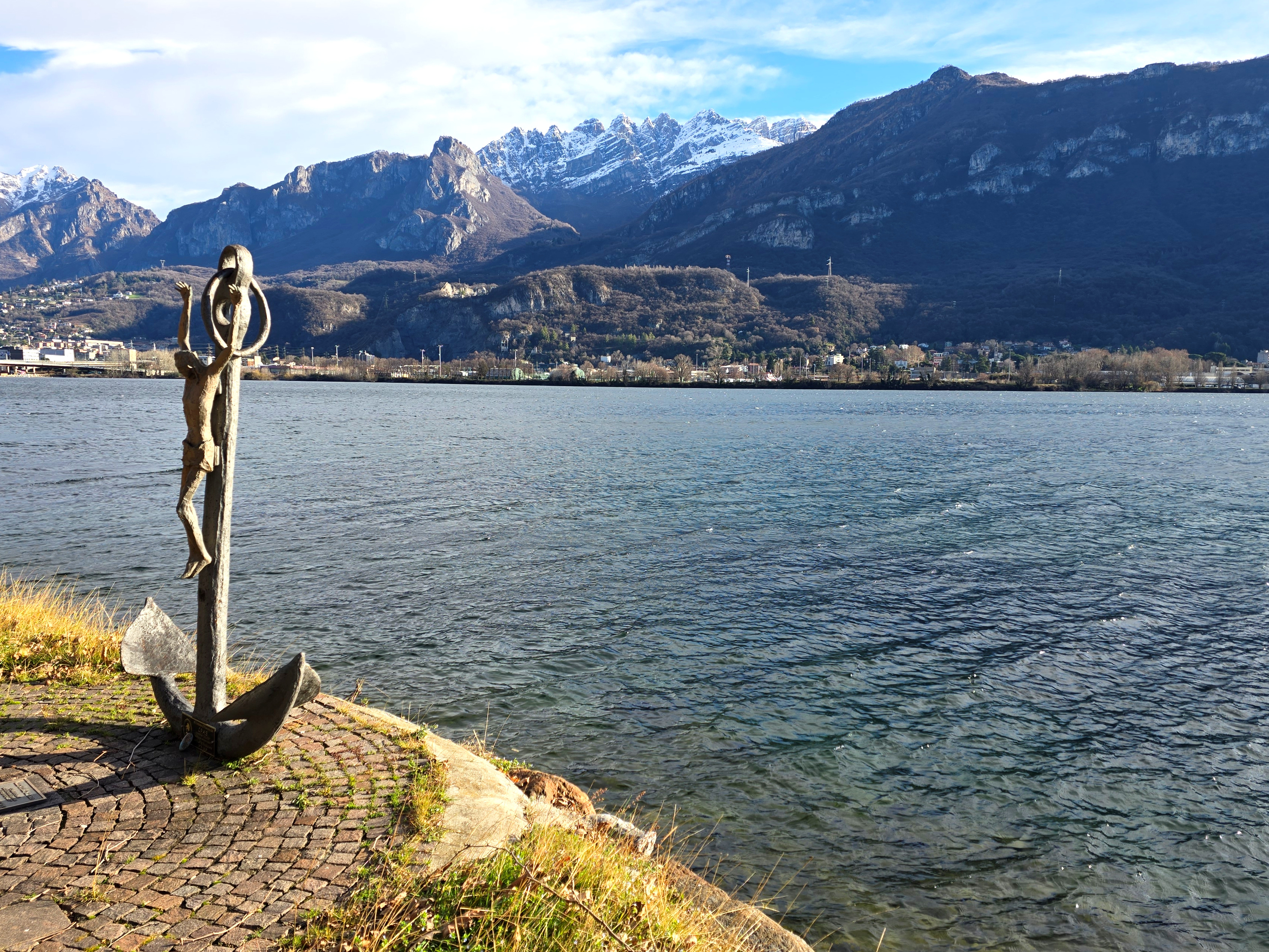
Lake Garlate, with the monument to the victims of the lake and Mount Resegone in background

The municipality of Pescate contains the frazioni (subdivisions, mainly villages and hamlets) Pescalina, Insirano, Torrette Inferiori, and Torrette Superiori.

Pescate borders the following municipalities: Galbiate, Garlate, Lecco.

== Demographic evolution ==
Historical population

Year	Pop.	±%
1861	370	—
1871	364	−1.6%
1881	399	+9.6%
1901	481	+20.6%
1911	569	+18.3%

Year	Pop.	±%
1921	632	+11.1%
1931	823	+30.2%
1936	868	+5.5%
1951	1,048	+20.7%
1961	1,077	+2.8%

Year	Pop.	±%
1971	1,472	+36.7%
1981	1,771	+20.3%
1991	1,797	+1.5%
2001	1,983	+10.4%

Source: Data from ISTAT
