= Nibionno =

Nibionno Nibiònn (Lombard)
- Comune
- Comune di Nibionno
- Coat of arms

- Location within Italy Location within Lombardy
- Coordinates: 45°45′N 9°15′E
- Country: Italy
- Region: Lombardy
- Province: Lecco (LC)
- Frazioni: California, Gaggio, Molino Nuovo, Mongodio, Tabiago-Cibrone

Government
  - Mayor: Laura Di Terlizzi

Area
  - Total: 3.6 km^{2} (1.4 sq mi)
- Elevation: 306 m (1,004 ft)

Population (1 August 2010)
  - Total: 3,641
  - Density: 1,000/km^{2} (2,600/sq mi)
- Demonym: Nibionnesi
- Time zone: UTC+1 (CET)
  - Summer (DST): UTC+2 (CEST)
- Postal code: 23895
- Dialing code: 031
- Patron saint: Saints Simon and Jude
- Website: Official website

Nibionno (locally Nibiònn) is a comune (municipality) in the Province of Lecco in the Italian region Lombardy, located about 30 kilometres (19 mi) north of Milan and about 15 kilometres (9 mi) southwest of Lecco.

Nibionno borders the following municipalities: Bulciago, Cassago Brianza, Costa Masnaga, Inverigo, Lambrugo, Veduggio con Colzano.

The town's economy is mostly based on textile industry.
