= Abbadia Lariana =

- Comune
- Comune di Abbadia Lariana
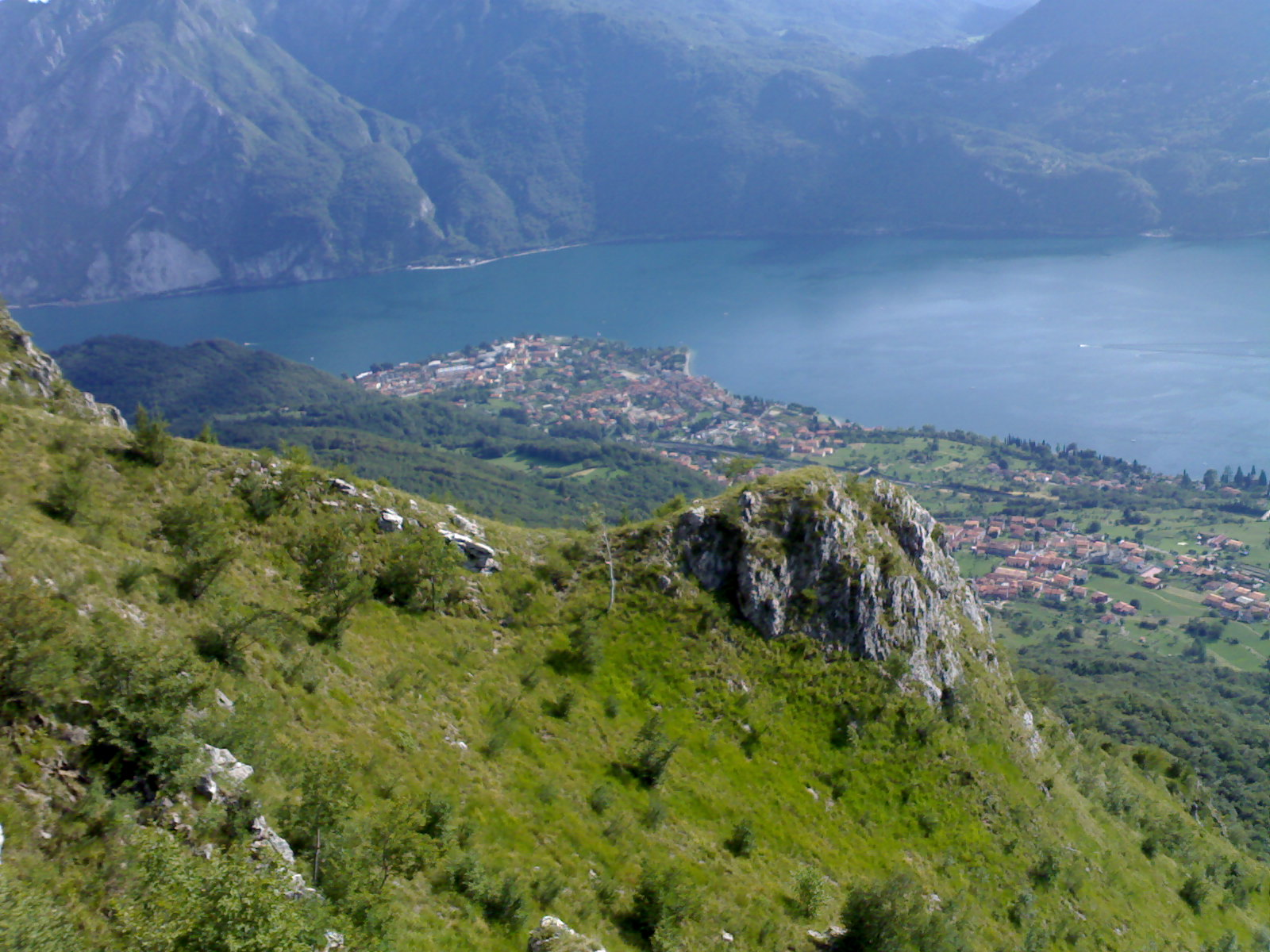
- View of Abbadia Lariana

- Coat of arms

- Location of Abbadia Lariana in Italy Abbadia Lariana (Lombardy)
- Coordinates: 45°54′N 9°20′E
- Country: Italy
- Region: Lombardy
- Province: Lecco (LC)
- Frazioni: Borbino, Castello, Chiesa Rotta, Crebbio, Linzanico, Lombrino, Molini, Novegolo, Onedo, Robianico, San Rocco, Zana

Government
  - Mayor: Cristina Bartesaghi

Area
  - Total: 16.67 km^{2} (6.44 sq mi)
- Elevation: 204 m (669 ft)

Population (30 April 2017)
  - Total: 3,209
  - Density: 192.5/km^{2} (498.6/sq mi)
- Demonym: Abbadiensi
- Time zone: UTC+1 (CET)
  - Summer (DST): UTC+2 (CEST)
- Postal code: 23821
- Dialing code: 0341
- Patron saint: St. Lawrence
- Website: Official website

Abbadia Lariana (Lecchese: Badia) is a comune (municipality) in the Province of Lecco in the Italian region of Lombardy, located about 50 kilometres (31 mi) northeast of Milan and about 8 kilometres (5 mi) northwest of Lecco. The village has about 3,280 inhabitants and its name comes from an abbey (abbazia in Italian) founded in the 9th century and later destroyed.

== History ==
Archaeological excavations dated the first settlement to Roman period. The benedictine abbey was founded in 770 - 775 by the Lombardic King Desiderius and gave the name to the city. During the 17th to 19th centuries, the silk industry developed here, from 1817 led by the family of Pietro Monti, later by Cima.

== Historical and cultural monuments ==
- San Lorenzo Church, famous picture Madonna della cintura con santi Agostino, Monica e Domenico
- Waterfall Cenghen
- Civico Museo Setificio Monti − city silk museum in a former silk factory of the family Monti
