= Introbio =

Introbio Intröbi (Lombard)
- Comune
- Comune di Introbio
- Location of Introbio in Italy Introbio (Lombardy)
- Coordinates: 45°58′N 9°27′E
- Country: Italy
- Region: Lombardy
- Province: Lecco (LC)

Government
  - Mayor: Eusebio Marconi

Area
  - Total: 25.6 km^{2} (9.9 sq mi)
- Elevation: 586 m (1,923 ft)

Population (Dec. 2004)
  - Total: 1,673
  - Density: 65.4/km^{2} (169/sq mi)
- Time zone: UTC+1 (CET)
  - Summer (DST): UTC+2 (CEST)
- Postal code: 22040
- Dialing code: 0341
- Patron saint: St. Anthony the Abbot
- Website: Official website

Introbio (Valsassinese Lombard: Intröbi) is a comune (municipality) in the Province of Lecco in the Italian region Lombardy, located about 60 kilometres (37 mi) northeast of Milan and about 14 kilometres (9 mi) northeast of Lecco in the Valsassina.
