= Province of Lecco =

Province in Lombardy, Italy

Coordinates: 45°51′N 9°24′E

Province of Lecco Provincia di Lecco (Italian) Pruincia de Lecch (Lombard)
- Province
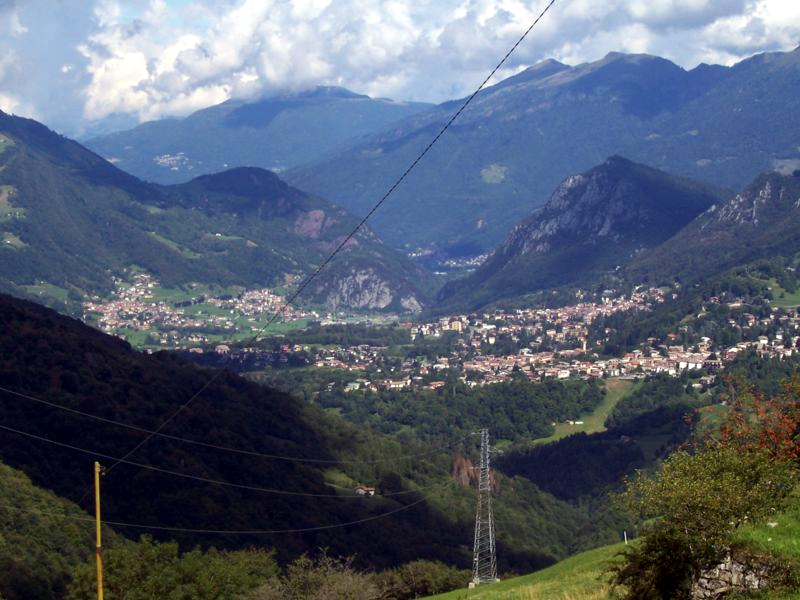
- Valsassina Valley

- Coat of arms

- Location of the province of Lecco in Italy
- Country: Italy
- Region: Lombardy
- Capital(s): Lecco
- Municipalities: 84

Government
  - President: Alessandra Hofmann

Area (Note: Excluding Torre de' Busi, which separated from the province in 2018.)
  - Total: 805.61 km^{2} (311.05 sq mi)

Population (2026)
  - Total: 334,211
  - Density: 414.85/km^{2} (1,074.5/sq mi)

GDP (2021)
  - Total: €11,328 billion
  - Per capita: €34,019
  - Total, PPP: $18,348
  - Per capita, PPP: $55,098
- Time zone: UTC+1 (CET)
  - Summer (DST): UTC+2 (CEST)
- Postal code: 23900
- Telephone prefix: 0341, 039, 031
- Vehicle registration: LC
- ISTAT code: 097

Map of the historical regions of the province of Lecco

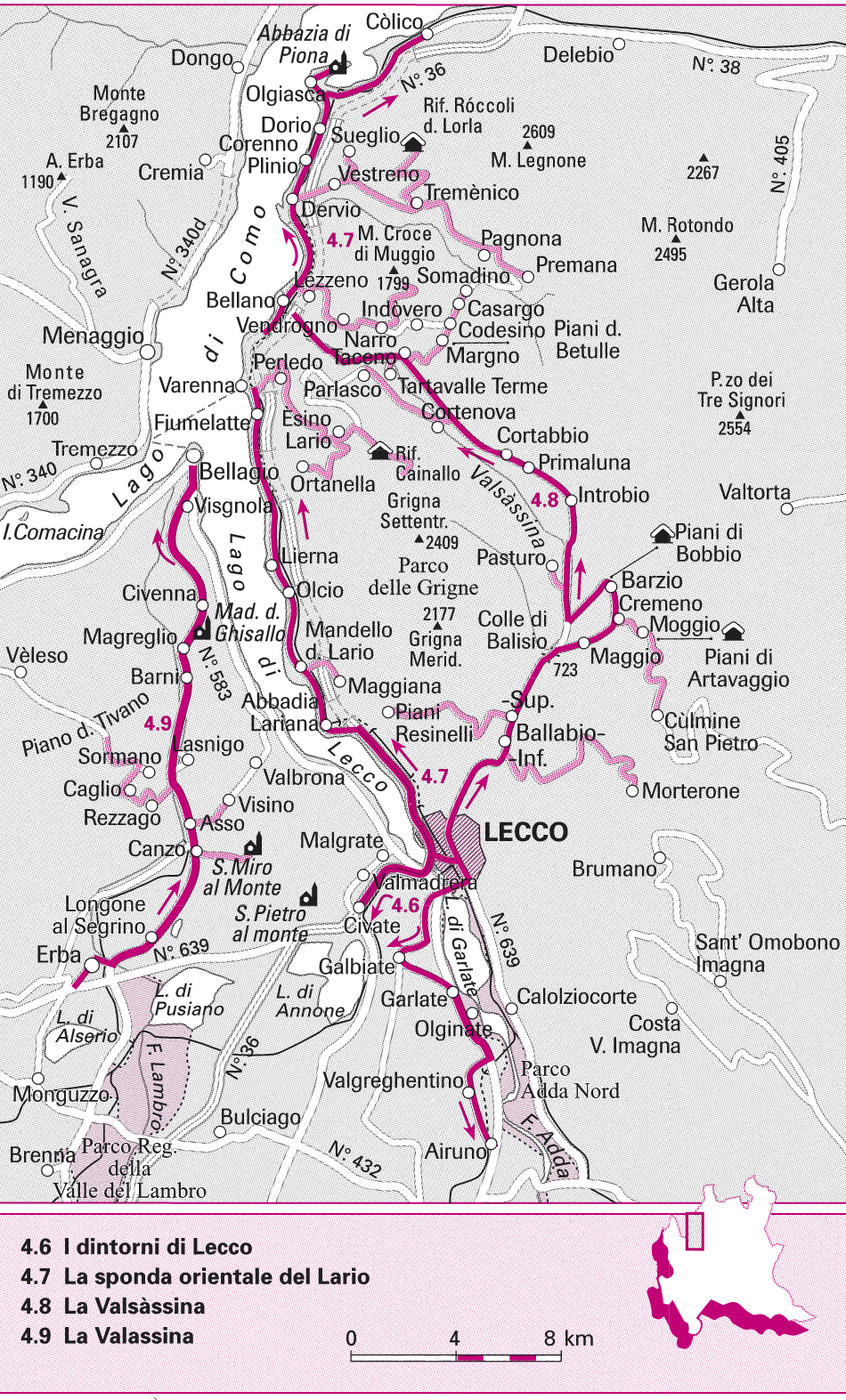
Map of the surroundings of Lecco, the eastern shore of Lake Como (Lario), the Valsassina and the Valassina

The province of Lecco (Italian: provincia di Lecco; Lecchese: pruincia de Lecch) is a province in the region of Lombardy in Italy. Its capital is the city of Lecco.

It has a population of 334,211 in an area of 805.61 square kilometres (311.05 sq mi) across its 84 municipalities.

== History ==
The Province of Lecco was established by the Presidential Decree No. 250 of 6 March 1992, by spinning off 84 municipalities from the Province of Como and 6 from Bergamo (some of which were merged over time, bringing the number from 90 to 80). Elections for the appointment of the first President of the Province of Lecco were held on 23 April 1995 (1st round) and 7 May 1995 (runoff). The proclamation of the first President, Mario Anghileri, occurred on 9 May 1995.

== Geography ==
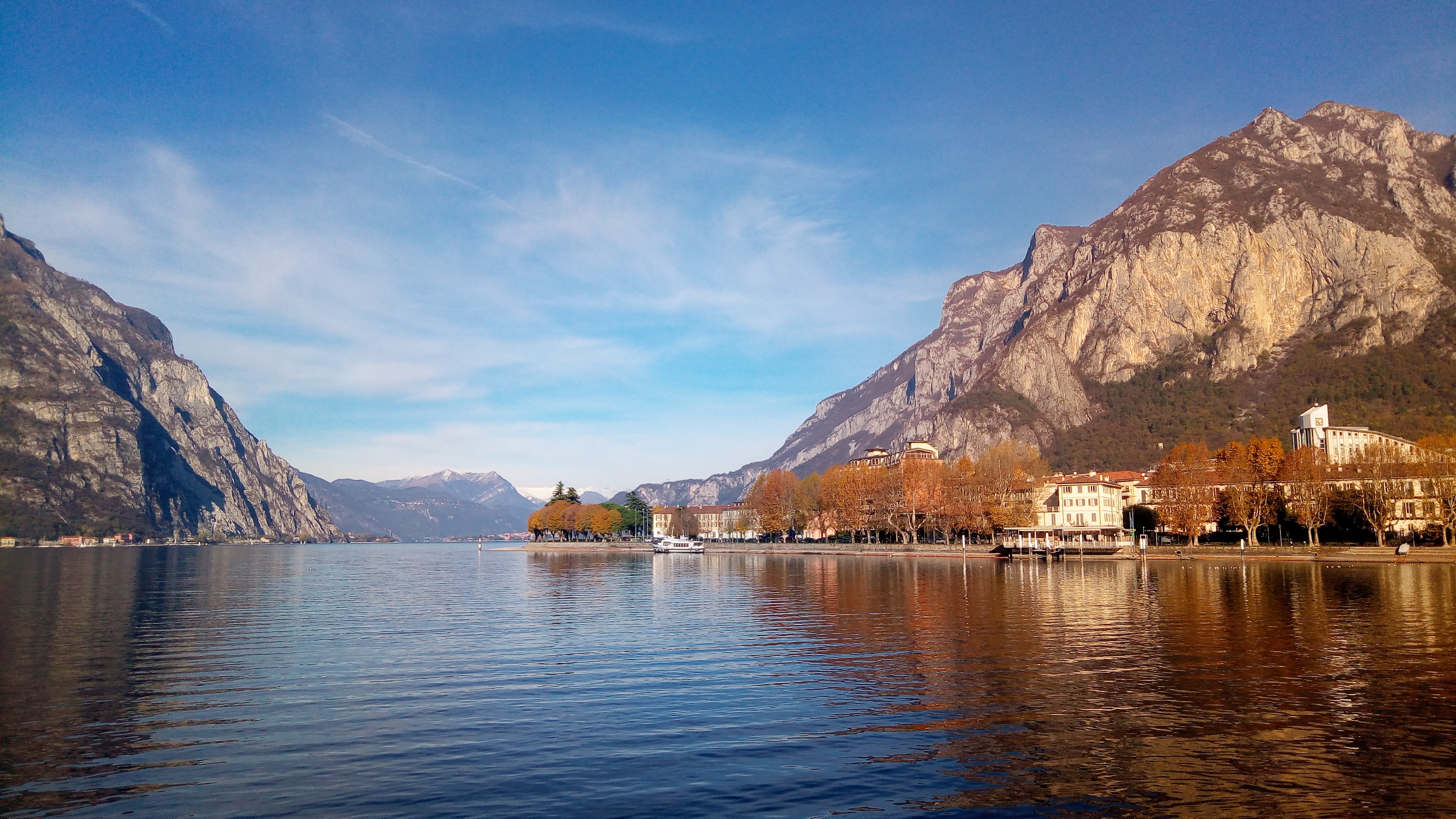
The basin of the Lake Como in front of Lecco

The Province of Lecco is situated in northern central Italy. It is bordered to the north and west by the Province of Como, to the east and north with the Province of Sondrio, to the east by the Province of Bergamo, and to the south with the Province of Monza and Brianza. The province of Lecco has an area of only 805.61 square kilometres (311.05 sq mi), with some 600 square kilometres (230 sq mi) located across the Adda River, in Valsassina. The remaining land is located in the Oggionese, the Casatese, and the Meratese, with an additional 16 square kilometres (6.2 sq mi) belonging to the municipality of Oliveto Lario, located on the other side of Lake Como, in Vallassina, within the pre-Alpine Lecchese. 70% of the province is mountainous and the other 30% is hilly. The highest point is Mount Legnone in the north of the province, 2,609 metres (8,560 ft) high; at the center of the spectacular Grigne. In the west, is Monte Cornizzolo lake at 1,240 metres (4,070 ft) and Monte Rai at 1,259 metres (4,131 ft). In the east of the province is Monte Serrada and the Resegone di Lecco, 1,875 metres (6,152 ft) with its characteristic shape reminiscent of the teeth of a saw. In the center-south is Monte Barro at 922 metres (3,025 ft), in the Monte Barro Regional Park.

The province contains numerous lakes, with Lake Como and Lake Annone in the comunes of Garlate and Olginate. To the west, the comunes of Rogeno, Bosisio Parini, and Cesana Brianza overlook Lake Pusiano. There is also an abundance of rivers, including the main Adda river and the Lambro, running through Costa Masnaga, Rogeno, and Nibionno. Other smaller rivers are the Molgora, the Bevera, a tributary of the Lambro, the Pioverna flowing in Valsassina, and Varro flowing in Val Varrone.

== Government ==
=== Municipalities ===
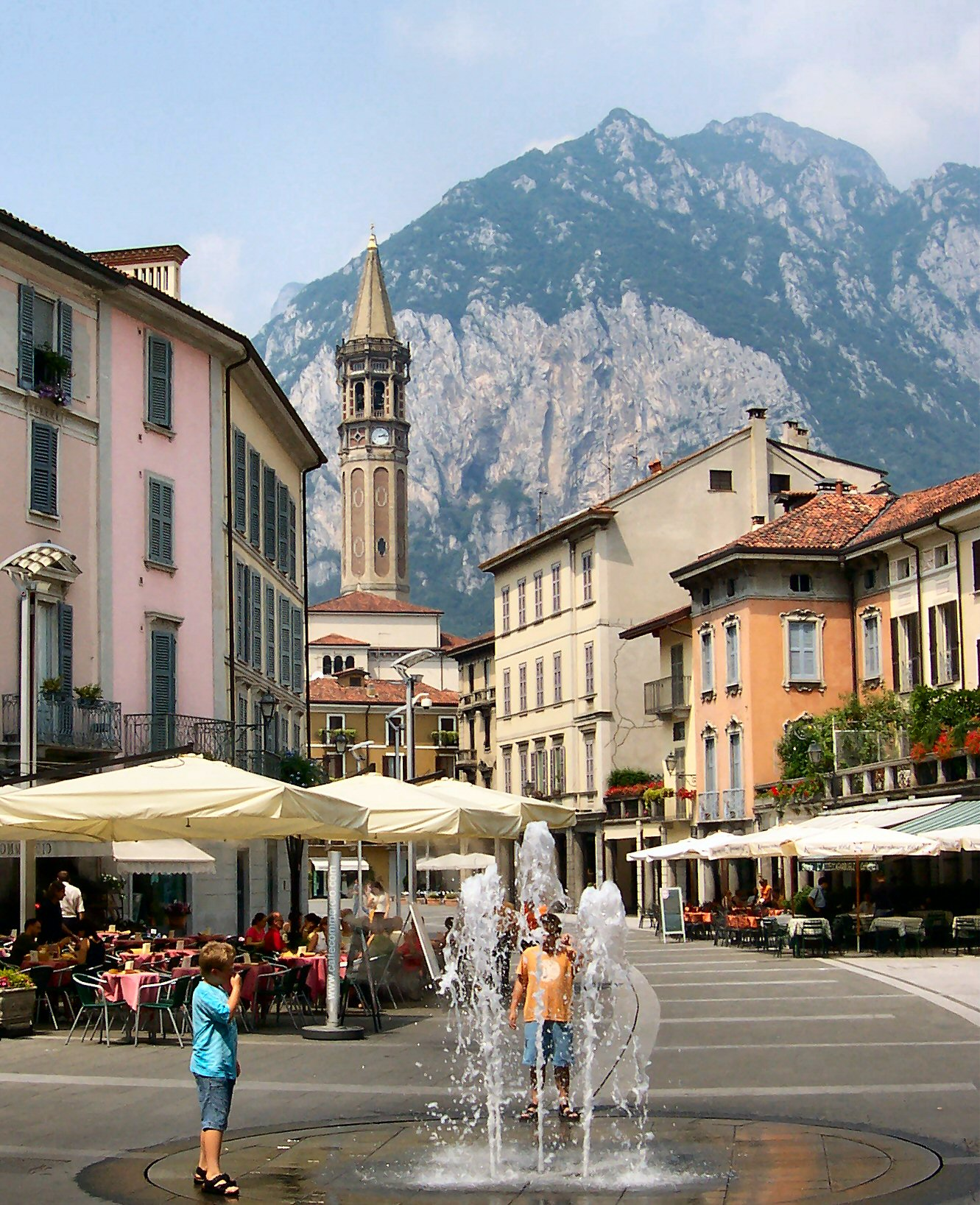
Lecco

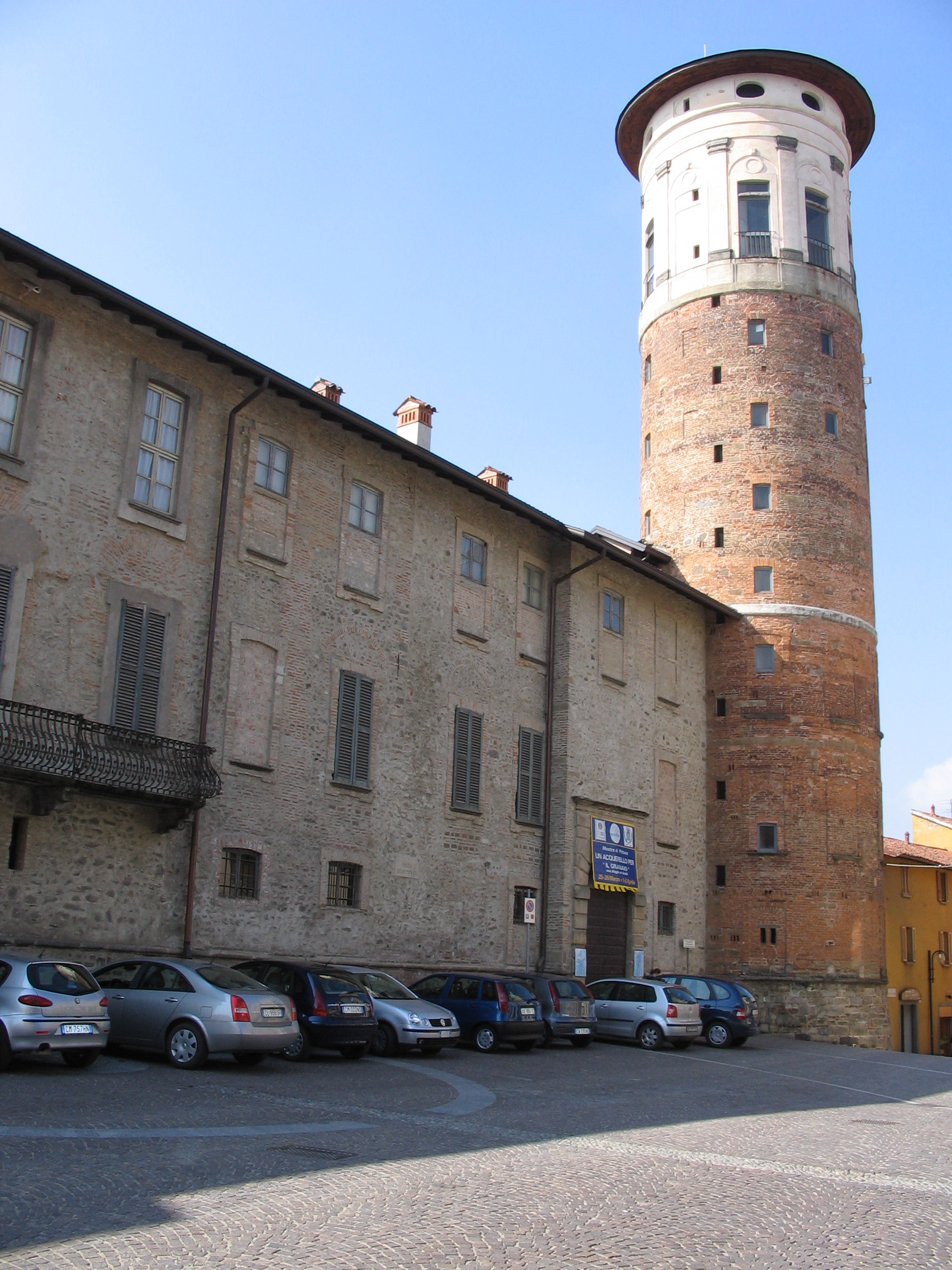
Merate

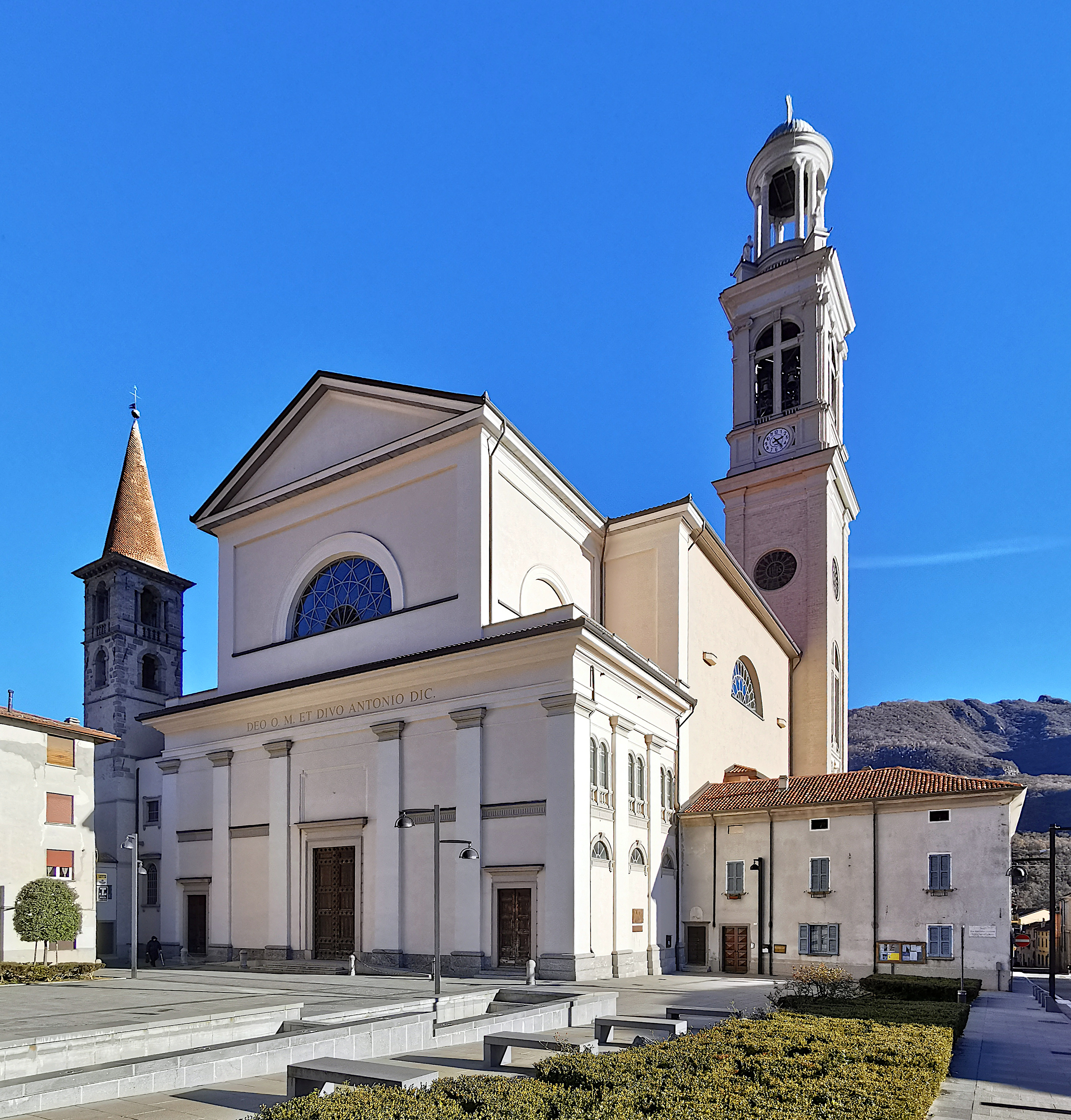
Valmadrera

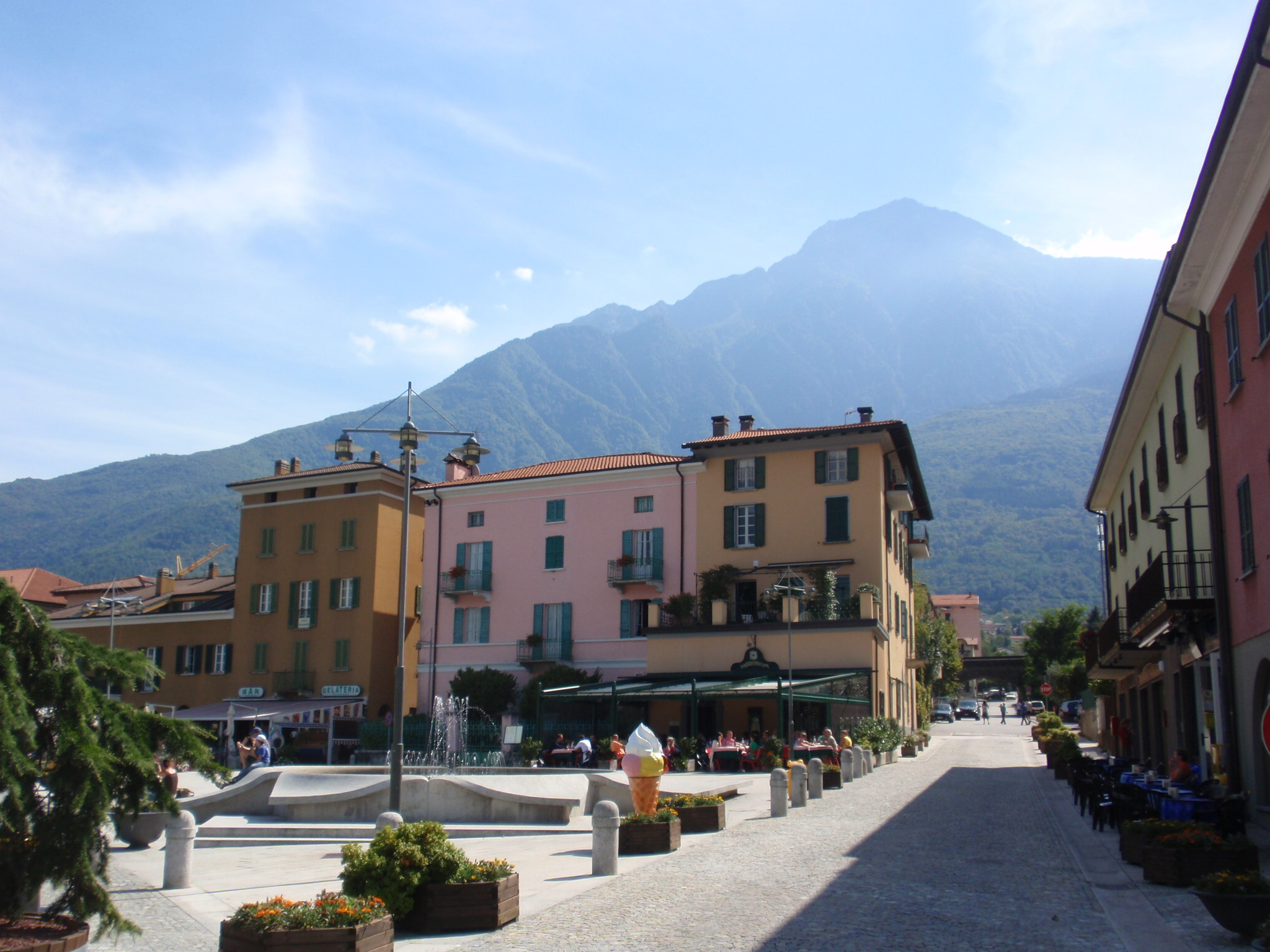
Colico

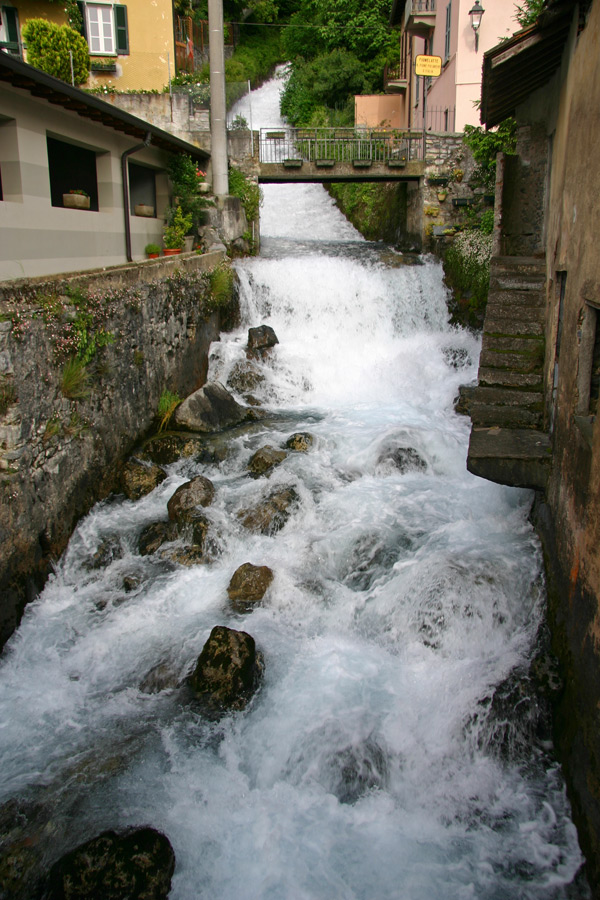
Fiumelatte river

The province has 84 municipalities: (‡ marks municipalities belonging to the historical region of Brianza)

- Abbadia Lariana‡
- Airuno‡
- Annone di Brianza‡
- Ballabio
- Barzago‡
- Barzanò‡
- Barzio
- Bellano
- Bosisio Parini‡
- Brivio‡
- Bulciago‡
- Calco‡
- Calolziocorte
- Carenno
- Casargo
- Casatenovo‡
- Cassago Brianza‡
- Cassina Valsassina
- Castello di Brianza‡
- Cernusco Lombardone‡
- Cesana Brianza‡
- Civate‡
- Colico
- Colle Brianza‡
- Cortenova
- Costa Masnaga‡
- Crandola Valsassina
- Cremella‡
- Cremeno
- Dervio
- Dolzago‡
- Dorio
- Ello‡
- Erve
- Esino Lario
- Galbiate‡
- Garbagnate Monastero‡
- Garlate‡
- Imbersago‡
- Introbio
- La Valletta Brianza‡
- Lecco
- Lierna
- Lomagna‡
- Malgrate
- Mandello del Lario
- Margno
- Merate‡
- Missaglia‡
- Moggio
- Molteno‡
- Monte Marenzo
- Montevecchia‡
- Monticello Brianza‡
- Morterone
- Nibionno‡
- Oggiono‡
- Olgiate Molgora‡
- Olginate‡
- Oliveto Lario
- Osnago‡
- Paderno d'Adda‡
- Pagnona
- Parlasco
- Pasturo
- Perledo
- Pescate
- Premana
- Primaluna
- Robbiate‡
- Rogeno‡
- Santa Maria Hoè‡
- Sirone‡
- Sirtori‡
- Sueglio
- Suello‡
- Taceno
- Valgreghentino‡
- Valmadrera
- Valvarrone
- Varenna
- Vercurago
- Verderio‡
- Viganò‡

== Demographics ==
As of 2026, the population is 334,211, of which 49.6% are male, and 50.4% are female. Minors make up 14.6% of the population, and seniors make up 26.1%.

Historical population

Year	Pop.	±%
1861	128,077	—
1871	135,705	+6.0%
1881	144,047	+6.1%
1901	162,425	+12.8%
1911	178,205	+9.7%
1921	178,929	+0.4%
1931	187,192	+4.6%
1936	191,038	+2.1%

Year	Pop.	±%
1951	214,035	+12.0%
1961	231,276	+8.1%
1971	263,743	+14.0%
1981	285,047	+8.1%
1991	294,248	+3.2%
2001	309,708	+5.3%
2011	334,303	+7.9%
2021	332,457	−0.6%

Source: ISTAT

=== Immigration ===
As of 2025, immigrants make up 11.3% of the population. The 5 largest foreign countries of birth are Morocco, Albania, Romania, Senegal, and Ukraine.

== Literature ==
The branch of Lake Como that turns south between two unbroken mountain chains, bordered by coves and inlets that echo the furrowed slopes, suddenly narrows to take the flow and shape of a river, between a promontory on the right and a wide shoreline on the opposite side.

— Alessandro Manzoni, The Betrothed – Chapter I, p. 9, 1840; translated by Michael F. Moore, 2022

An unnamed village of near Lecco is the initial setting for The Betrothed (Italian: I promessi sposi), an Italian historical novel by Alessandro Manzoni first published in 1827 and significantly revised and rewritten until the definitive version published between 1840 and 1842. It has been called the most famous and widely read novel in the Italian language, and it is generally ranked among the masterpieces of world literature. The story revolves around Renzo and Lucia, a poor local couple whose wedding plans are hindered by a Spanish baron who is in love with Lucia.

== Transport ==
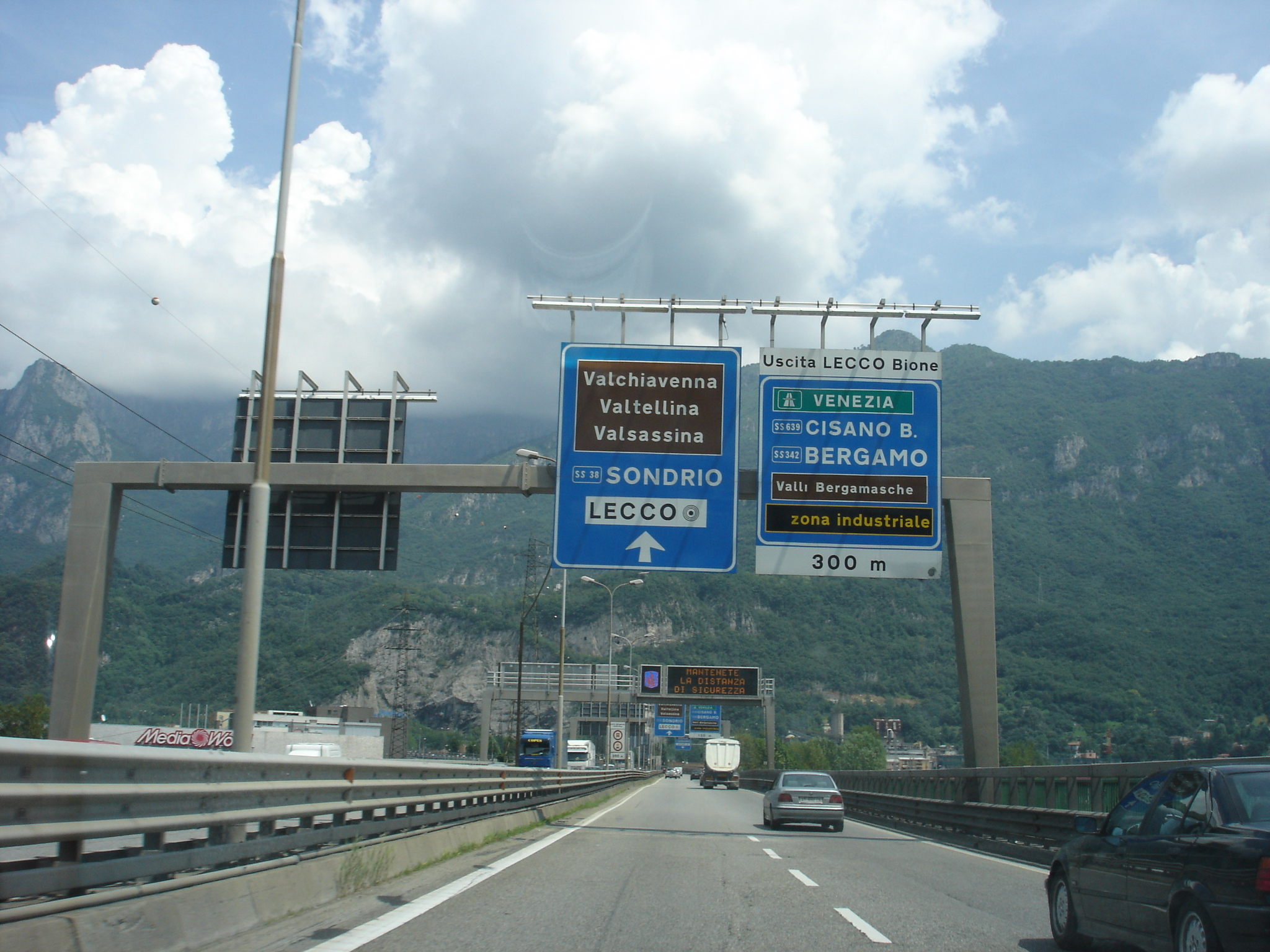
Strada statale 36 del Lago di Como e dello Spluga in Lecco

=== State highways ===
- Strada statale 36 del Lago di Como e dello Spluga: Sesto San Giovanni-Splügen Pass

=== Railway lines ===
- Como–Lecco railway
- Tirano–Lecco railway
