= Malgrate =

Malgrate Malgraa (Lombard)
- Comune
- Comune di Malgrate
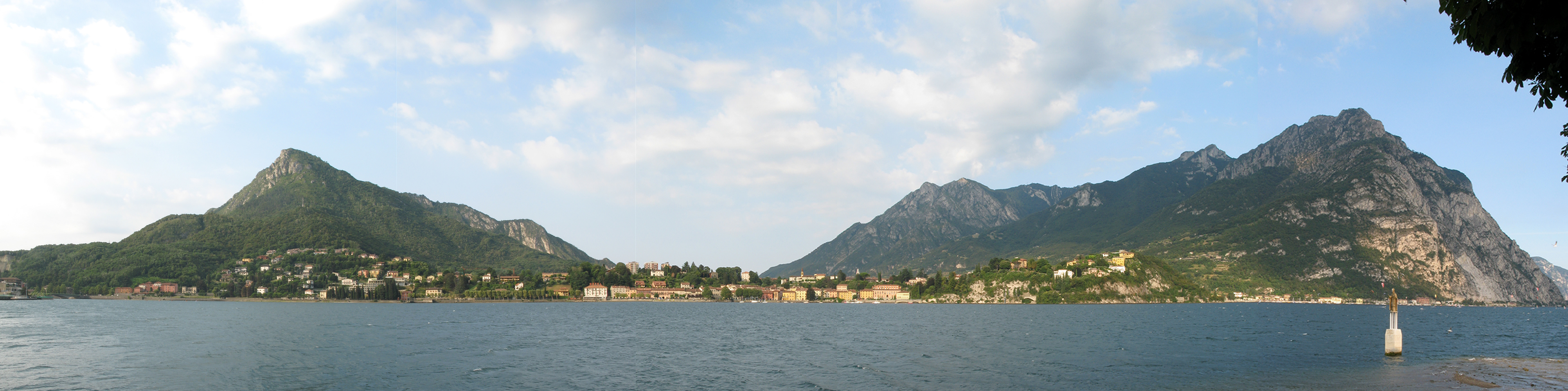
- Malgrate - Skyline

- Location within Italy Location within Lombardy
- Coordinates: 45°51′N 9°24′E
- Country: Italy
- Region: Lombardy
- Province: Province of Lecco (LC)
- Frazioni: Malgrate Bassa, Gaggio, Paradiso, Porto

Government
  - Mayor: Michele Peccati

Area
  - Total: 2.0 km^{2} (0.77 sq mi)
- Elevation: 231 m (758 ft)

Population (Dec. 2004)
  - Total: 4,233
  - Density: 2,100/km^{2} (5,500/sq mi)
- Demonym: Malgratesi
- Time zone: UTC+1 (CET)
  - Summer (DST): UTC+2 (CEST)
- Postal code: 23864
- Dialing code: 0341
- Patron saint: S. Leonardo
- Saint day: Nov 6

Malgrate (Lecchese: Malgraa) is a comune (municipality) in the Province of Lecco, in the Italian region Lombardy. Malgrate is located across from Lecco, which is geographically divided by the Lake Como. According to 31 December 2004 demographic data, it has a population of 4,233 in an area of 2.0 square kilometres (0.77 mi^{2}). It is located about 45 kilometres (28 mi) northeast of Milan, the main city in Northern Italy.

Malgrate, located after Lecco to the West, is one of the gates of the Brianza. Malgrate borders Galbiate, where in Figina, (in the current territory of Villa Vergano, a frazione of Galbiate), appears the first written mention of the name Brianza. Malgrate borders also the following municipalities: Lecco and Valmadrera.

In ancient Roman times, the town was known as Antesitum.

It is the birthplace of Angelo Scola (born 7 November 1941), a Cardinal of the Catholic Church, philosopher, and theologist.

== Twin towns ==
Malgrate is twinned with:

- Lavarone, Italy
