= Cassina Valsassina =

- Comune
- Comune di Cassina Valsassina
- Coat of arms

- Location of Cassina Valsassina in Italy Cassina Valsassina (Lombardy)
- Coordinates: 45°56′N 09°28′E
- Country: Italy
- Region: Lombardy
- Province: Lecco (LC)

Government
  - Mayor: Paolo Bianchi (since June 14, 2004)

Area
  - Total: 2 km^{2} (0.77 sq mi)

Population (2011)
  - Total: 483
  - Density: 240/km^{2} (630/sq mi)
- Time zone: UTC+1 (CET)
  - Summer (DST): UTC+2 (CEST)
- Postal code: 22040
- Dialing code: 0341
- Website: Official website

Cassina Valsassina (Valassinese Lombard: Casìna) is a town and comune in the province of Lecco, in Lombardy.
