= Ballabio =

Ballabio Balàbi (Lombard)
- Comune
- Comune di Ballabio
- Location within Italy Location within Lombardy
- Coordinates: 45°54′N 9°25′E
- Country: Italy
- Region: Lombardy
- Province: Lecco (LC)

Government
  - Mayor: Alessandra Consonni

Area
  - Total: 15.04 km^{2} (5.81 sq mi)
- Elevation: 661 m (2,169 ft)

Population (30 April 2017)
  - Total: 4,043
  - Density: 268.8/km^{2} (696.2/sq mi)
- Demonym: Ballabiesi
- Time zone: UTC+1 (CET)
  - Summer (DST): UTC+2 (CEST)
- Postal code: 23811
- Dialing code: 0341
- Website: Official website

Ballabio (Valassinese Lombard: Balàbi) is a comune (municipality) in the Province of Lecco in the Italian region Lombardy, located about 50 km (31 mi) northeast of Milan and about 6 km (3.7 mi) north of Lecco, in the Valsassina.

Historically, it has been a centre for the production of cheese. Brands from the area include Galbani and Locatelli.
