= Barzio =

Barzio Bàrs (Lombard)
- Comune
- Comune di Barzio
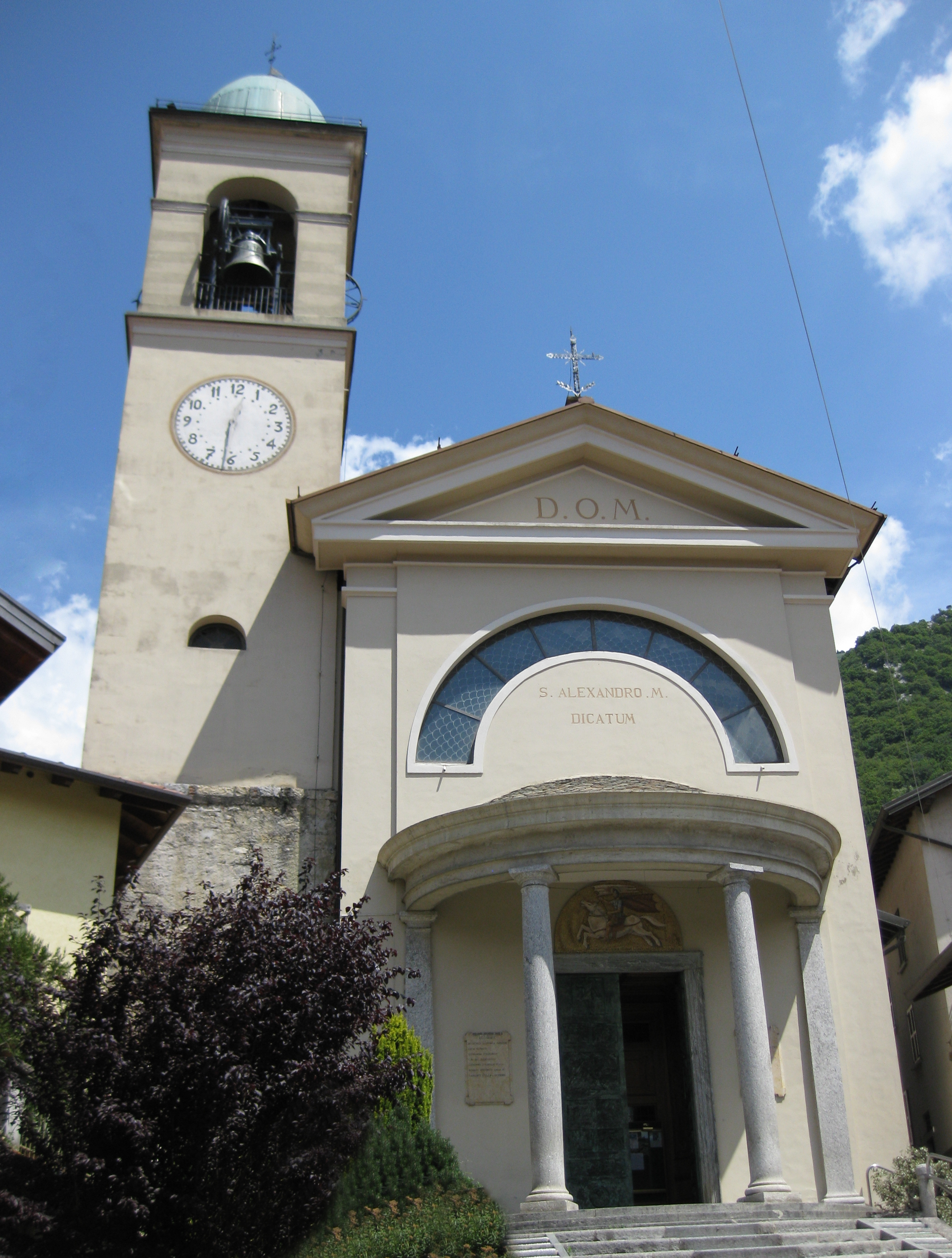
- St.Alexander church, Barzio

- Coat of arms

- Location within Italy Location within Lombardy
- Coordinates: 45°57′N 9°28′E
- Country: Italy
- Region: Lombardy
- Province: Lecco (LC)
- Frazioni: Concenedo

Government
  - Mayor: Giovanni Arrigoni Battaia

Area
  - Total: 21.4 km^{2} (8.3 sq mi)
- Elevation: 769 m (2,523 ft)

Population (30 April 2017)
  - Total: 1,338
  - Density: 62.5/km^{2} (162/sq mi)
- Demonym: Barziesi
- Time zone: UTC+1 (CET)
  - Summer (DST): UTC+2 (CEST)
- Postal code: 23816
- Dialing code: 0341
- Patron saint: St. Alexander
- Website: Official website

Barzio (Valsassinese Lombard: Bàrs) is a comune (municipality) in the Province of Lecco in the Italian region Lombardy, located in the Valsassina about 60 kilometres (37 mi) northeast of Milan and about 12 kilometres (7 mi) northeast of Lecco.

== Twin towns ==
- Magland, France
