= Brianzöö dialect =

Western Lombard dialects of Brianza, Italy

Brianzöö
- Brianzoeu
- Pronunciation: [brjãˈtsøː]
- Native to: Italy
- Language family: Indo-European: Italic; Latino-Faliscan; Romance; Italo-Western; Western Romance; Gallo-Romance; Gallo-Italic; Lombard–Piedmontese?; Lombard; Western Lombard; Brianzöö
- Dialects: Canzés

Language codes
- ISO 639-3: –
- Glottolog: None

Brianzöö (modern orthography) or Brianzoeu (historical orthography) (Note: Italian: brianzolo [brjanˈtsɔːlo, bri.a-] or dialetto brianzolo.) is a group of variants (Prealpine and Western Lombard – macromilanese) of the Western variety of the Lombard language, spoken in the region of Brianza.

== Example ==
The Lord's Prayer
English

Our Father,
who is in heaven,
hallowed be your name.
Your Kingdom come,
your will be done,
on Earth as in heaven.
Give us today our daily bread.
Forgive us our sins,
as we forgive those who sin against us.
Lead us not into temptation,
but deliver us from evil.
Amen.

Brianzöö
(Classical orthography)

Pader nòster,
che te seet in ciel,
al sia santificaa ol tò Nòmm.
Al vegna ol tò Regn,
la sia fàda la toa volontà,
comè in ciel, inscee in Terra.
Dacc incoeu ol nòster pan quotidian,
scòrdes di nòster debitt,
inscee comè anca numm se scòrdom di quej di nòster debidor.
Facc minga borlà in de la tentazion,
ma deslibera numm dal maa.
Amen. (or E che 'l sia inscee.)

Italian

Padre nostro,
che sei nei cieli,
sia santificato il tuo Nome.
Venga il tuo Regno,
sia fatta la tua volontà,
come in cielo così in Terra.
Dacci oggi il nostro pane quotidiano,
e rimetti a noi i nostri debiti
come noi li rimettiamo ai nostri debitori,
e non-ci indurre in tentazione,
ma liberaci dal Male.
Amen.

Latin

Pater noster,
qui es in cœlis,
sanctificetur Nomen tuum.
Adveniat Regnum tuum,
fiat voluntas tua,
sicut in cœlo et in terra.
Panem nostrum cotidianum da nobis hodie,
et dimitte nobis debita nostra,
sicut et nos dimittimus debitoribus nostris,
et ne nos inducas in tentationem,
sed libera nos a malo.
Amen.

== Bibliography ==
- F. Cherubini, Vocabolario milanese-italiano, 5. Sopraggiunta. Nozioni filologiche intorno al Dialetto milanese. Saggio d'osservazioni si l'Idioma brianzuolo, suddialetto del milanese, xix-308 pp., Milano, Società Tipografica dei Classici Italiani, 1856
- Triangolo Lariano, Comunità montana del Triangolo Lariano, Canzo, 1980
- Grammatica dei dialetti della Lombardia, Mondadori, 2005

== See also ==
- Canzés dialect, a northern variety of Brianzöö.
