= Monte Pilastro =

Mountain in Italy

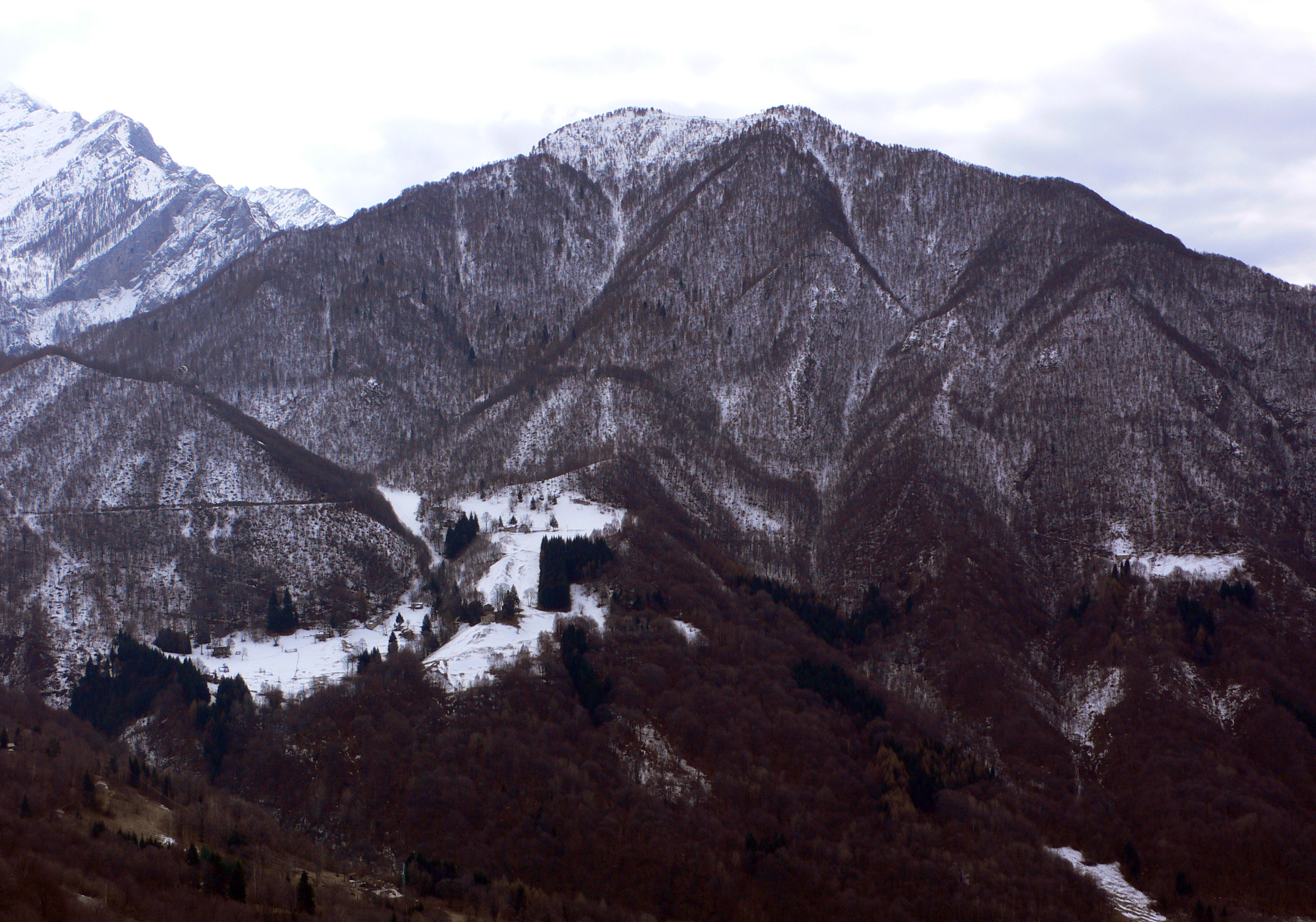
- Monte Pilastro seen from Esino Lario

Highest point
- Elevation: 1,827 m (5,994 ft)
- Prominence: 209 m (686 ft)
- Coordinates: 45°58′20″N 09°21′21″E

Geography
- Location: Lombardy, Italy
- Parent range: Orobic Alps

Monte Pilastro is a mountain of Lombardy, Italy, with an elevation of 1,827 metres (5,994 ft). It divides the Valsassina from the Val d'Esino, of which it is the highest point.

Part of the Grigne massif, it is located in the province of Lecco, overlooking Lake Como; to the south-east, the Bocchetta di Prada divides it from Grigna settentrionale, whereas to the north-east the Passo di Cainallo divides it from the Pizzi di Parlasco.

A large summit cross is located on a subpeak on the north-western ridge, called Monte Croce. A small unmanned mountain hut maintained by the Associazione Nazionale Alpini, the Bivacco Baitello dell'Amicizia, is located just below this subpeak.

The peak of Monte Pilastro can be reached through a number of hiking paths, of which the shortest can be accessed from Vo’ di Moncodeno in about an hour.
