= Moncodeno =

Mountain in Italy

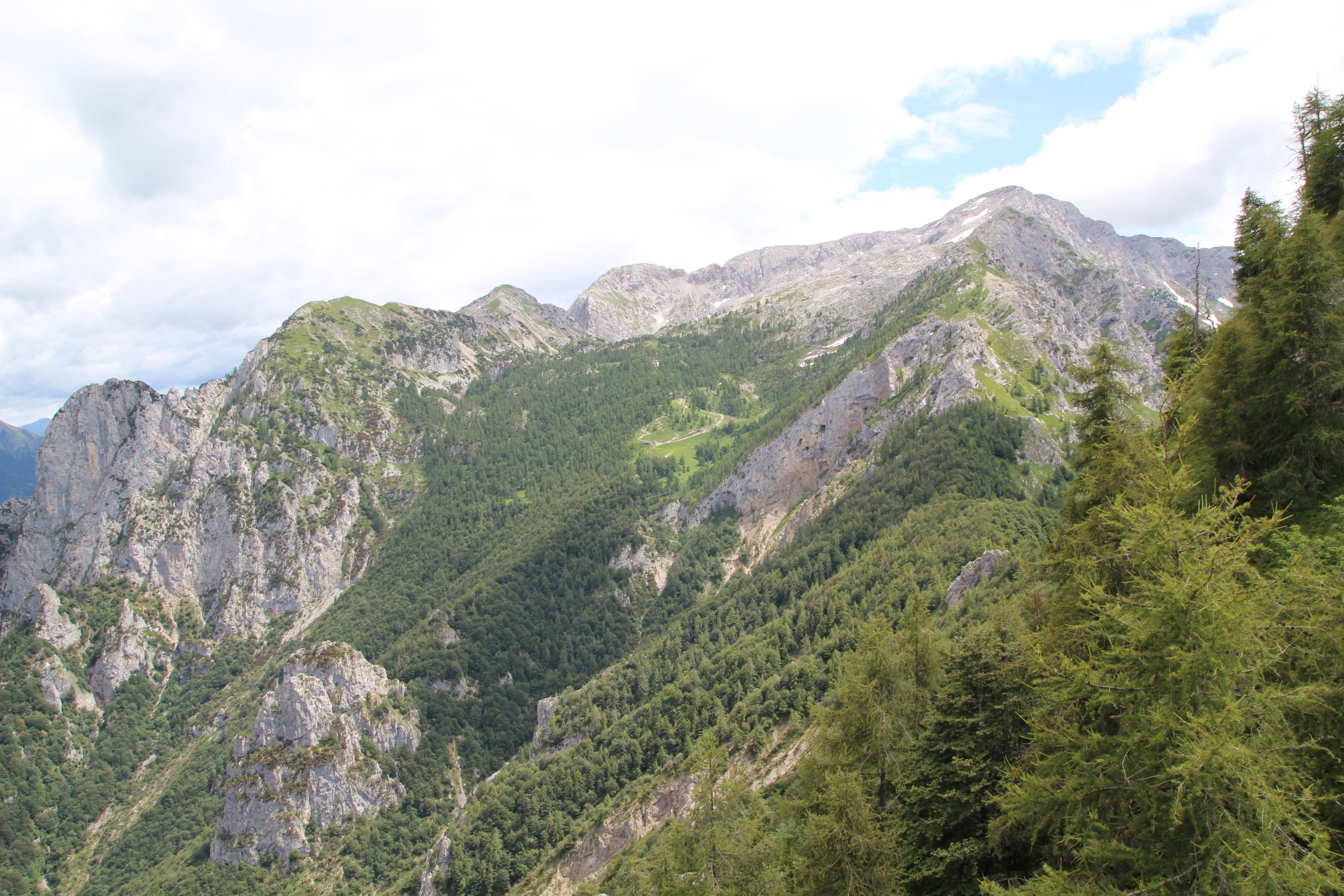

Highest point
- Elevation: 2,410 m (7,910 ft)
- Coordinates: 45°58′08″N 9°22′27″E

Geography
- Location within Alps
- Location: Lombardy, Italy
- Parent range: Bergamo Alps

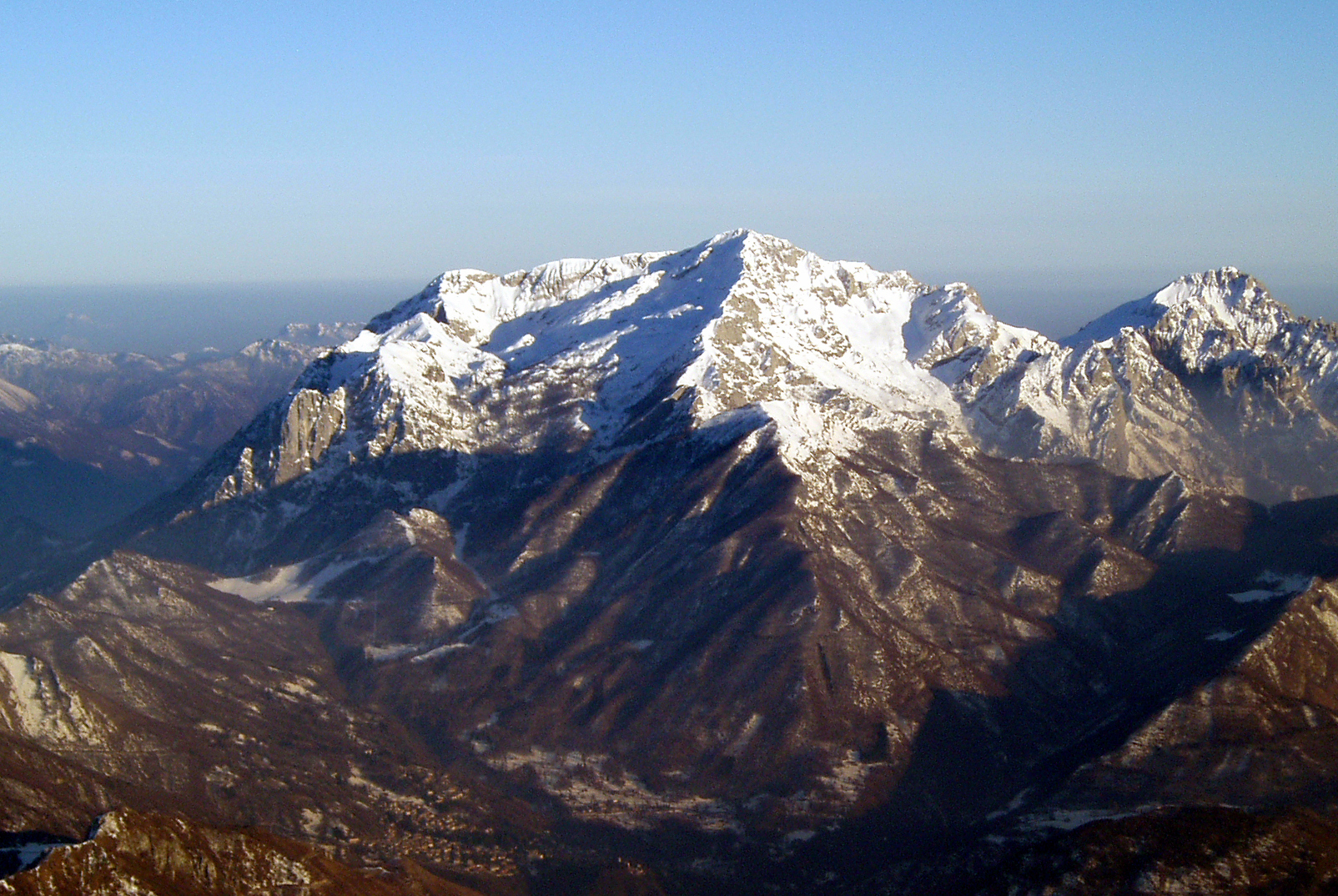
Moncodeno in autumn covered with snow

Moncodeno (Moncoeuden in Lombard) is a Cirque on the northern mountain slope of the Grigna, part of the Bergamasque Alps in the province of Lecco, Lombardy, northern Italy. It takes its name from the pasture of the same name. Mostly located in the administrative territory of the municipality of Esino Lario, a small part is situated in Cortenova.

== Geography ==
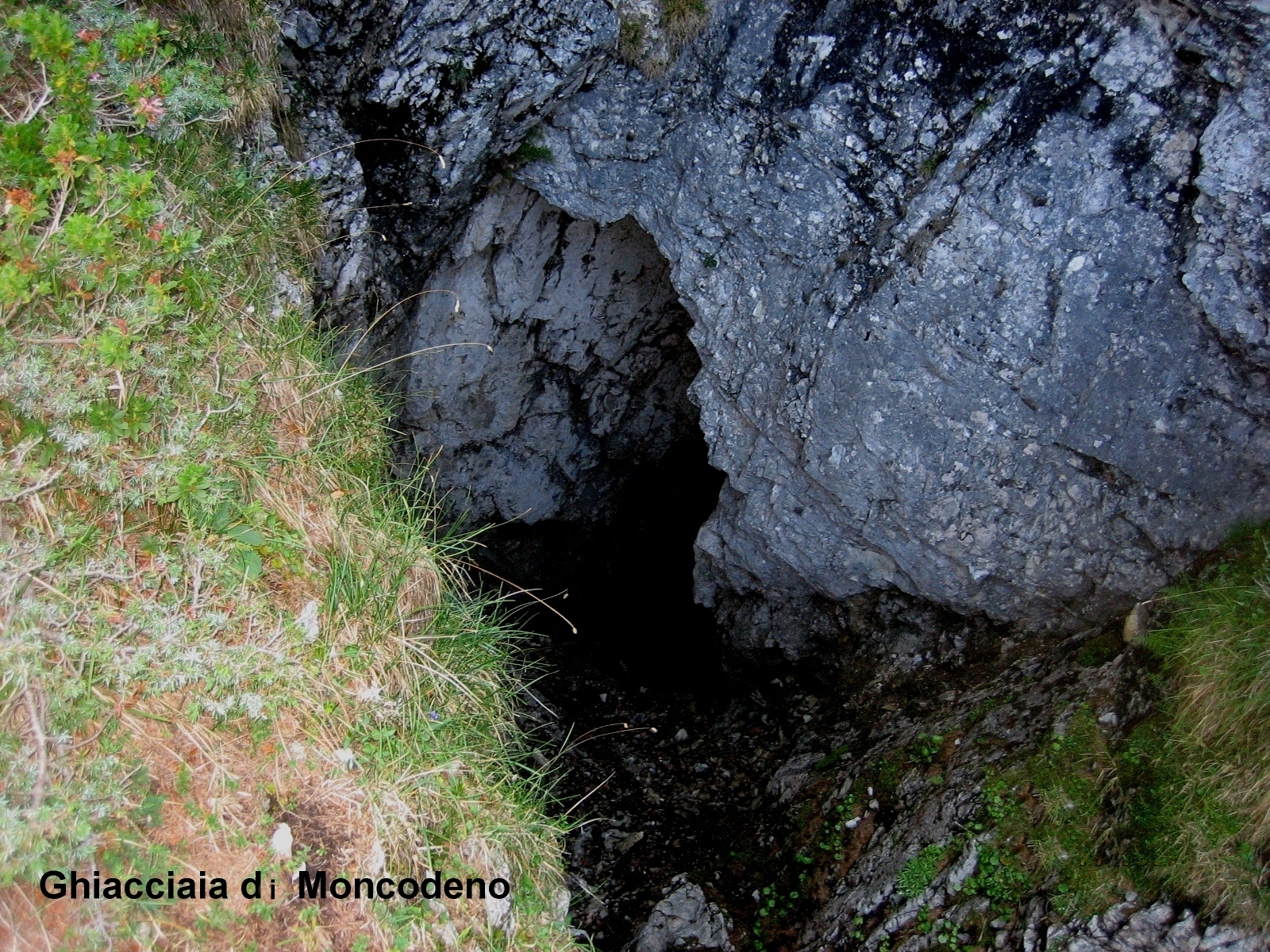
Ghiacciaia del Moncodeno, cave entrance

The geography is mainly karst and there are hundreds of caves. The most notable of these are the complesso del Releccio Alfredo Bini ^{(it)}, with a depth of 1,313 metres (4,308 ft), making it one of the deepest caves in Italy, as well as the Ghiacciaia del Moncodeno ^{(it)} (Icebox of Moncodeno), a cave, visited by Leonardo da Vinci that stays icy even in summer.

== History ==
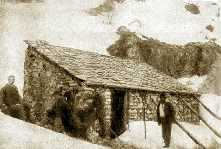
Capanna Moncodeno (1881)

In 1881, the 14th Congress of Italian mountaineers convened in Milan. The delegates of the Italian Alpine Club (CAI) were invited to attend a ceremony in Lombardy in the area known to the scientific world for the studies of Milan's CAI section president, the abbot and Lecco geologist, Antonio Stoppani, who founded the Capanna Moncodeno (hut). It is the first refuge built for Grigna researchers. The hut was destroyed by an avalanche in 1897. The Monza CAI rebuilt it close by in 1906 and named it Capanna Monza. This was set on fire and destroyed again by the Fascists in 1944. A new building was rebuilt and opened in 1951, named Rifugio Arnaldo Bogani.

== Bibliography ==
- Itinerari naturalistici in Moncodeno, Comunità Montana Valsassina Valvarrone Val d'Esino Riviera, 2003.
- Pietro Buzzoni, Andrea Spandri, Giuseppe Carì, Calcare d'autore, Comunità Montana Valsassina Valvarrone Val d'Esino Riviera, 2007.
- Kardel, Troels; Maquet, Paul (13 December 2012). Nicolaus Steno: Biography and Original Papers of a 17th Century Scientist. Springer Science & Business Media. ISBN 978-3-642-25079-8.
