= San Vittore, Esino Lario =

Church in Lombardy, Italy

Coordinates: 45.99418°N 9.32749°E

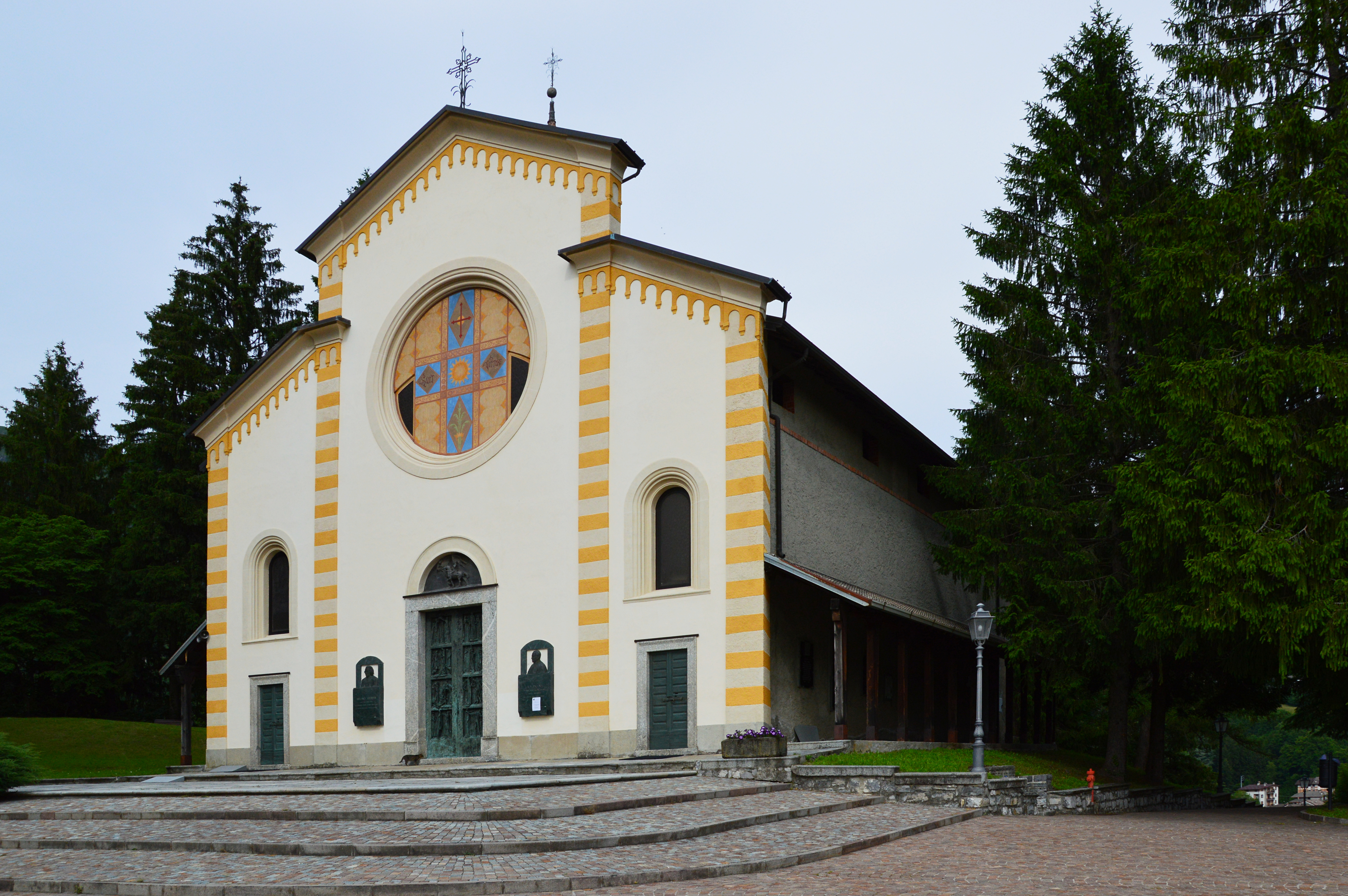
Church of San Vittore

San Vittore ("Saint Victor", Italian: Chiesa di San Vittore) is a parish church of the Roman Catholic Archdiocese of Milan in Esino Lario, Province of Lecco, Italy. It is located on a rocky outcrop and is dedicated to Victor Maurus (Victor the Moor), who died circa 303 in Milan.

== History ==
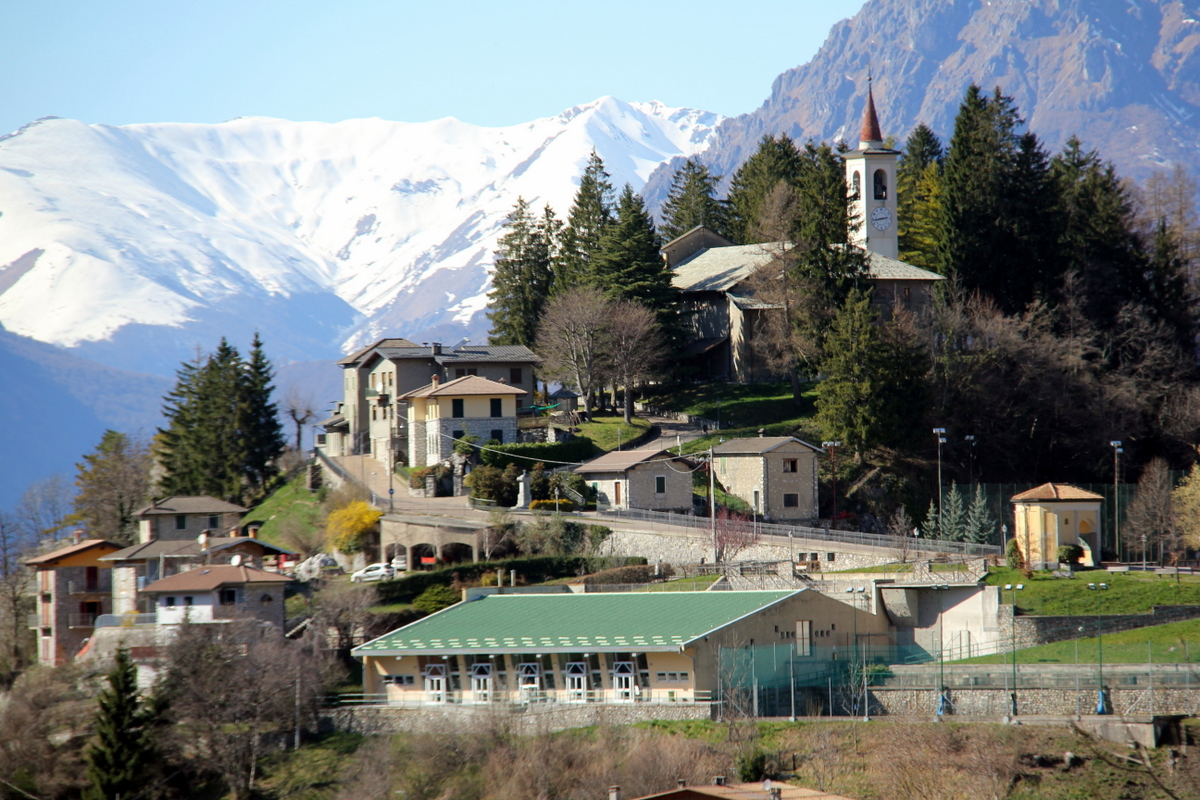
Exterior vista of the church with bell tower

The parish of San Vittore dates to the 15th century, but the church is from a previous era, as early as the 13th century. In the 14th century, it came under the Parish of Perledo, and in 1455, it detached from it. In the 19th century, it was included in the parish and vicariate of Perledo, remaining there until 1971, when it was given to the dean of the Alto Lario in " zona pastorale III di Lecco". In 1552, the Confraternity of the Blessed Sacrament was established at the church, and in 1662, the Confraternity of the Holy Rosary, which Archbishop Benedetto Erba Odescalchi joined in 1722.

== Architecture and fittings ==
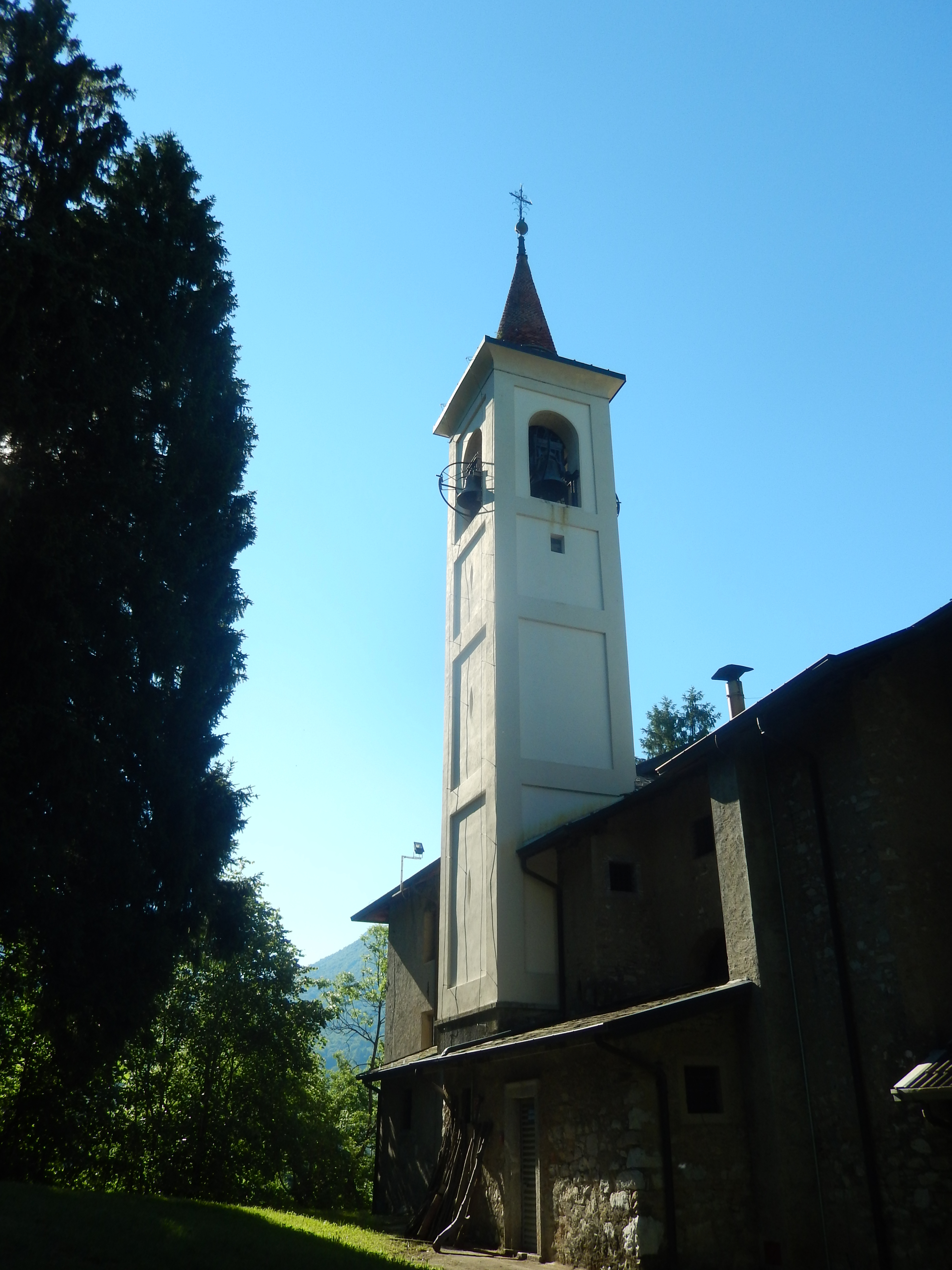
Bell tower

The present church is the result of a series of successive enlargements and changes over time, the first of which dates back to 1520. In 1849, the bell tower was rebuilt, acquiring its present appearance. Facade construction occurred in 1888–90. The bronze door that provides access to the nave dates to 1947. The work of the sculptor Dino Bonalberti, it depicts the life of the patron. The crescent bronze placed above the portal is the work of Michael Vedani and represents Gloria di San Vittore a cavallo. The last conservation work to the external façade dates back to 2009.

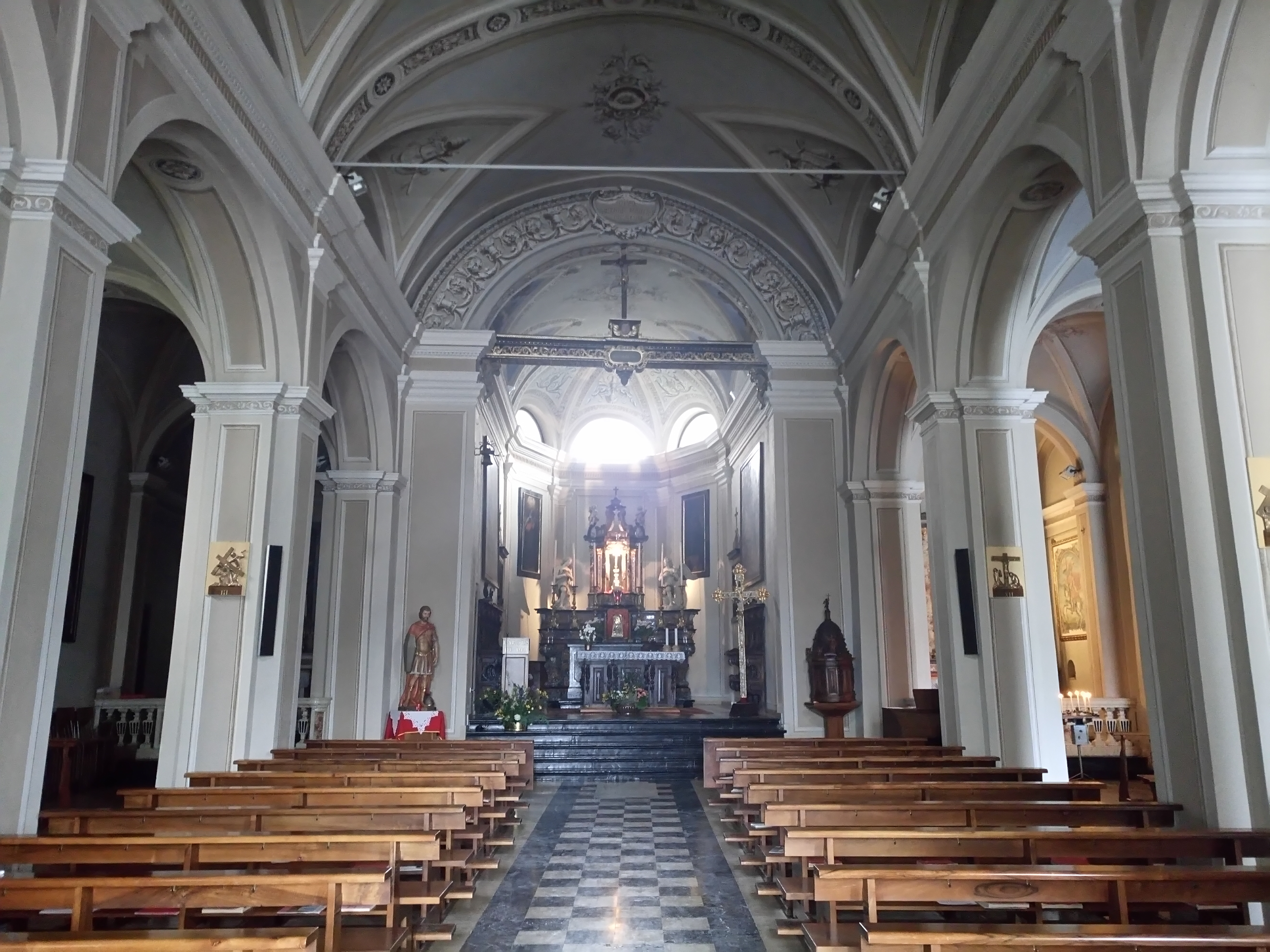
Interior

During the 16th-17th centuries, a nave was added with other additions in 1770–80. The interior contains a carved wooden lintel of 1654. The walnut baptistery dates to 1570. Baroque decorations were handmade in the second half of the 17th century by the parish priest Peter Garganico. These decorations include the cupboards of the sacristy, the stucco, the confessionals, the organ with the choir and frescoes. The wooden works -many of which are still present inside the church- were built between 1665 and 1685. On the ceiling of the sacristy, there is a fresco depicting the ascension of the Virgin Mary signed by Giuseppe Antonio Castelli. Other frescoes depict the Evangelists and Saints Lucia, Agatha, Agnes and Catherine. The current marble altar, the work of Antonio Albinola Viggiù, dates from the late 18th century, replacing an older one in walnut wood. On the sides of the presbytery are two paintings depicting San Vittore and Our Lady of the Rosary, attributed to Carlo Pozzo (1667). The San Carlo altar on the left is 19th century work by Gabrio Brunati. The two tapestries depicting the Birth of St. John the Baptist and Saint Anthony are works of the Scuola degli arazzi di Esino Lario (Tapestry School of Esino Lario).
