= Varenna–Esino–Perledo station =

Railway station in Lombardy, Italy

Varenna–Esino–Perledo
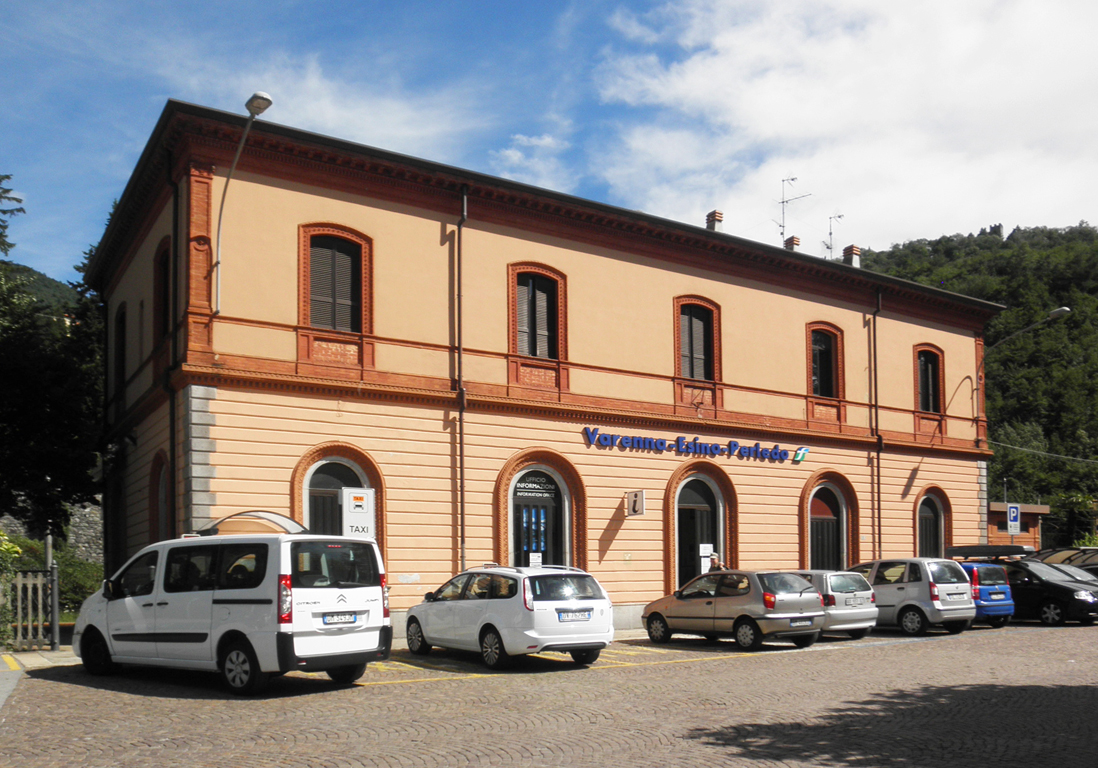
- The station in 2011

General information
- Location: Perledo, Lombardy; Italy
- Coordinates: 46.0151°N 9.28623°E
- Line: Tirano–Lecco railway
- Platforms: 2
- Tracks: 2

History
- Opened: 1892
Location

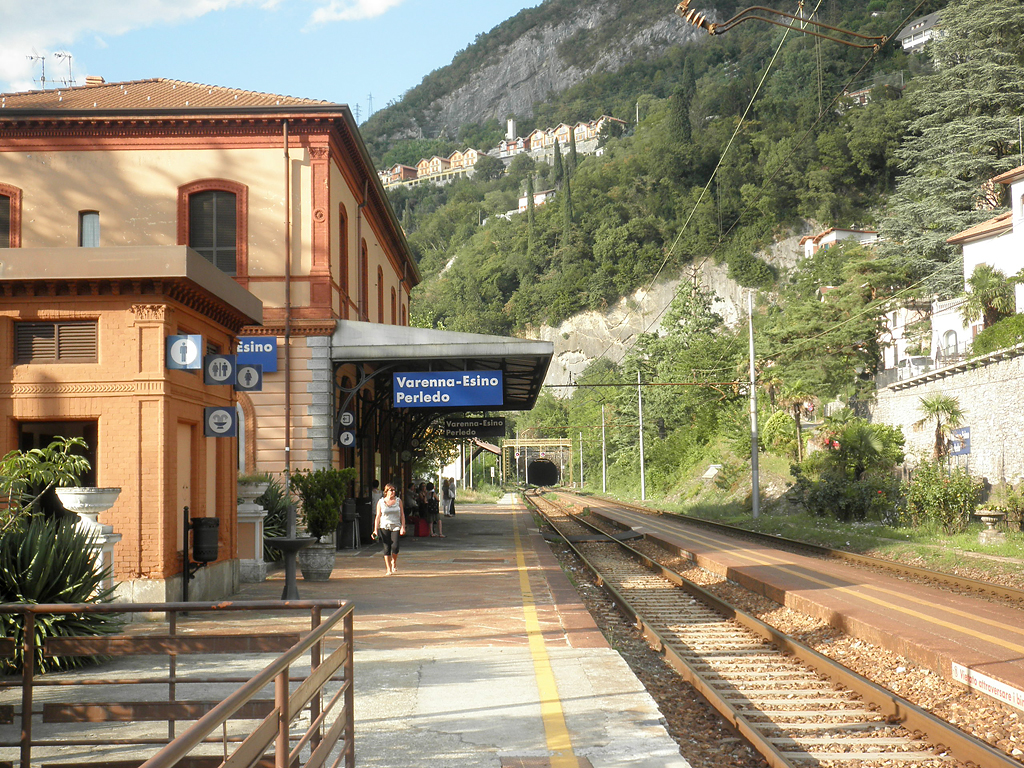
View of a platform in August 2012, looking North

Varenna–Esino–Perledo is a railway station at Perledo, on the Tirano–Lecco railway in Lombardy, in northern Italy. As the name implies, it also serves Esino Lario (12km away) and Varenna.

Originally called Varenna, it changed its name to Varenna–Esino in 1935.

The passenger building, on the west side of the line, has two storeys in a classic style, embellished by terracotta decorations typical of the line.

The station has two tracks for passenger service. In the past, there was a small freight yard, whose warehouse still exists, and is used as a shop.

The station is served by regional trains on the Calolziocorte–Lecco–Colico–Sondrio line, and RegioExpress trains in on the Milan–Lecco–Sondrio–Tirano line.
