= Museo delle Grigne =

Coordinates: 45.9960°N 9.3321°E

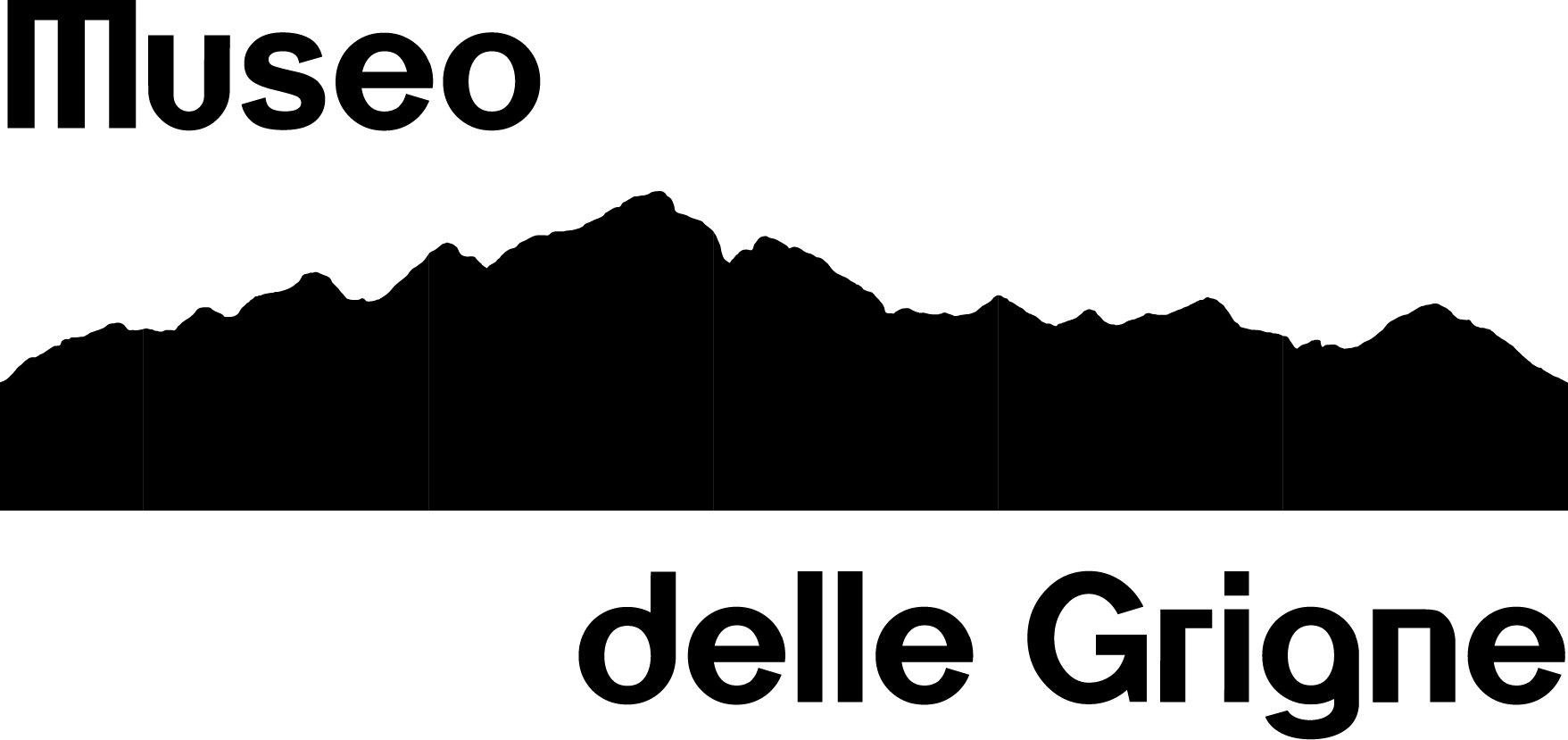
- Logo for Museo delle Grigne and Associazione Amici del Museo delle Grigne Onlus
- Established: 1959
- Location: Via Montefiori 19, 23825 Esino Lario, Italy
- Collection size: Natural history, archaeology, anthropology
- Website: https://museodellegrigne.it/

The Museo delle Grigne (Museum of Grigna) is the civic museum of Esino Lario in Italy. It preserves and presents to the public a collection of natural history materials including fossils, minerals, representations of phytoclimatic areas of the lake, dioramas of animals, and a collection of Italian butterflies, as well as archaeological and ethno-anthropological artifacts.

== History ==
The Museo delle Grigne is the first local museum in Province of Como, created in the 1930s by the priest Giovanni Battista Rocca, in order to let the public know the peculiarities of the territory. In the 1930s, during the construction of excavations for the expansion of the then inhabited walls, Gallic and Roman tombs emerged with interesting archaeological finds (swords, tools, jewelry, terracotta vessels, coins) the pastor don Giovanni Battista Rocca, a passionate botanist, placed the collections of plants and archaeological finds in the cemetery chapel located below the current parish church.

During World WarII the collections were looted by the displaced and by archaeologists. The mayor of Esino Lario, engineer Pietro Pensa, together with Battista Rocca, began to coordinate efforts with the City Administration, which recovered looted objects and added collections of animals and flowers. Parco Regionale Grigna Settentrionale has been working to improve and modernize the exhibition spaces, contributing to the construction of the new headquarters at Villa Clotilde.

== Buildings ==
The museum is divided into two buildings, the new seat in Villa Clotilde garden (inaugurated in April 2016) and a space on the first floor of Villa Clotilde.

== Administration ==
The Museo delle Grigne has been managed by the Associazione Amici del Museo delle Grigne Onlus since 1990. It is part of the museum system of the Province of Lecco.
