= Grigna =

Mountain in Lombardy, Italy

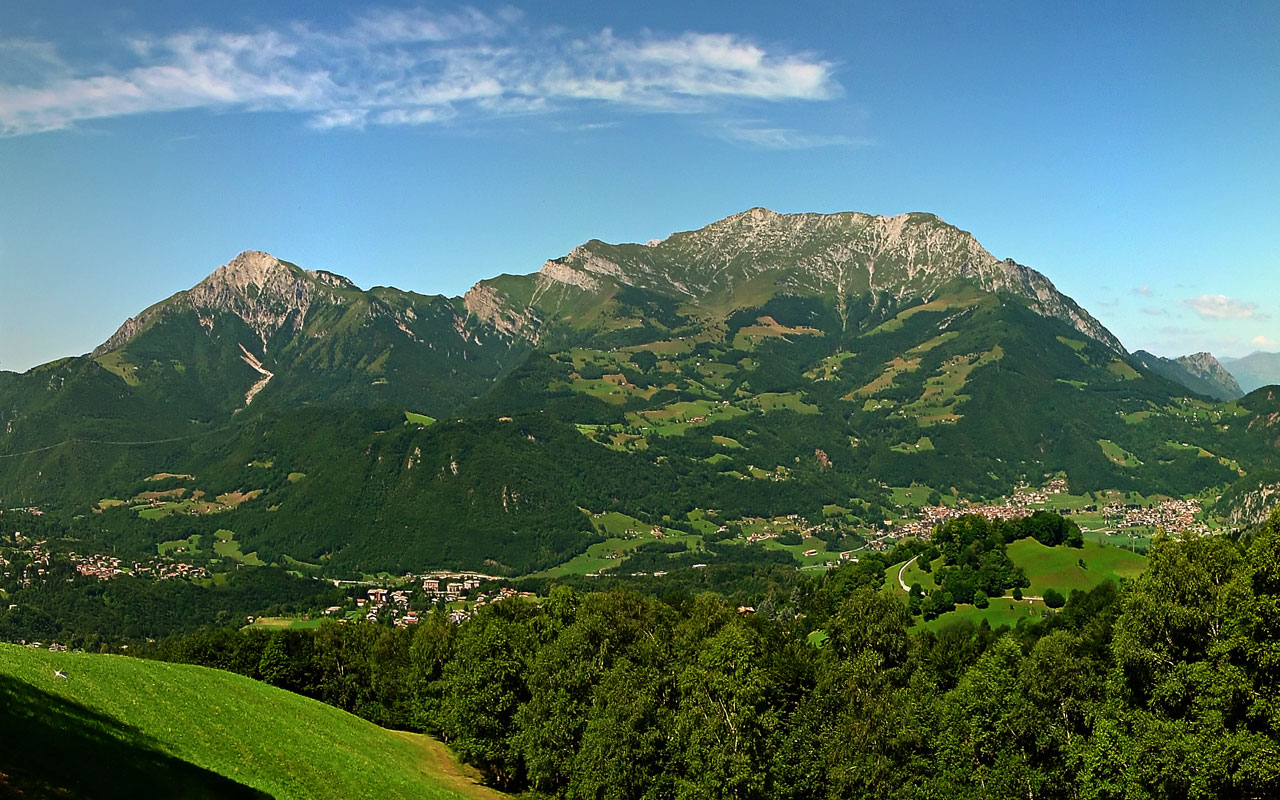
- Grignetta (left) and Grignone (right)

Highest point
- Elevation: 2,410 m (7,910 ft)
- Prominence: 1,687 m (5,535 ft)
- Listing: Ultra
- Coordinates: 45°57′12″N 09°23′15″E

Geography
- Location within Alps
- Location: Lombardy, Italy
- Parent range: Bergamo Alps

The Grigna is a mountain massif in the province of Lecco, Lombardy, northern Italy, with an elevation of 2,410 metres (7,907 ft). It is part of the Orobic Pre-Alps, and it has two peaks, Grignone or Grigna settentrionale(2,410m), the higher Northern, and the lower, Southern Grignetta or Grigna meridionale (2,184 m).

== Geography ==
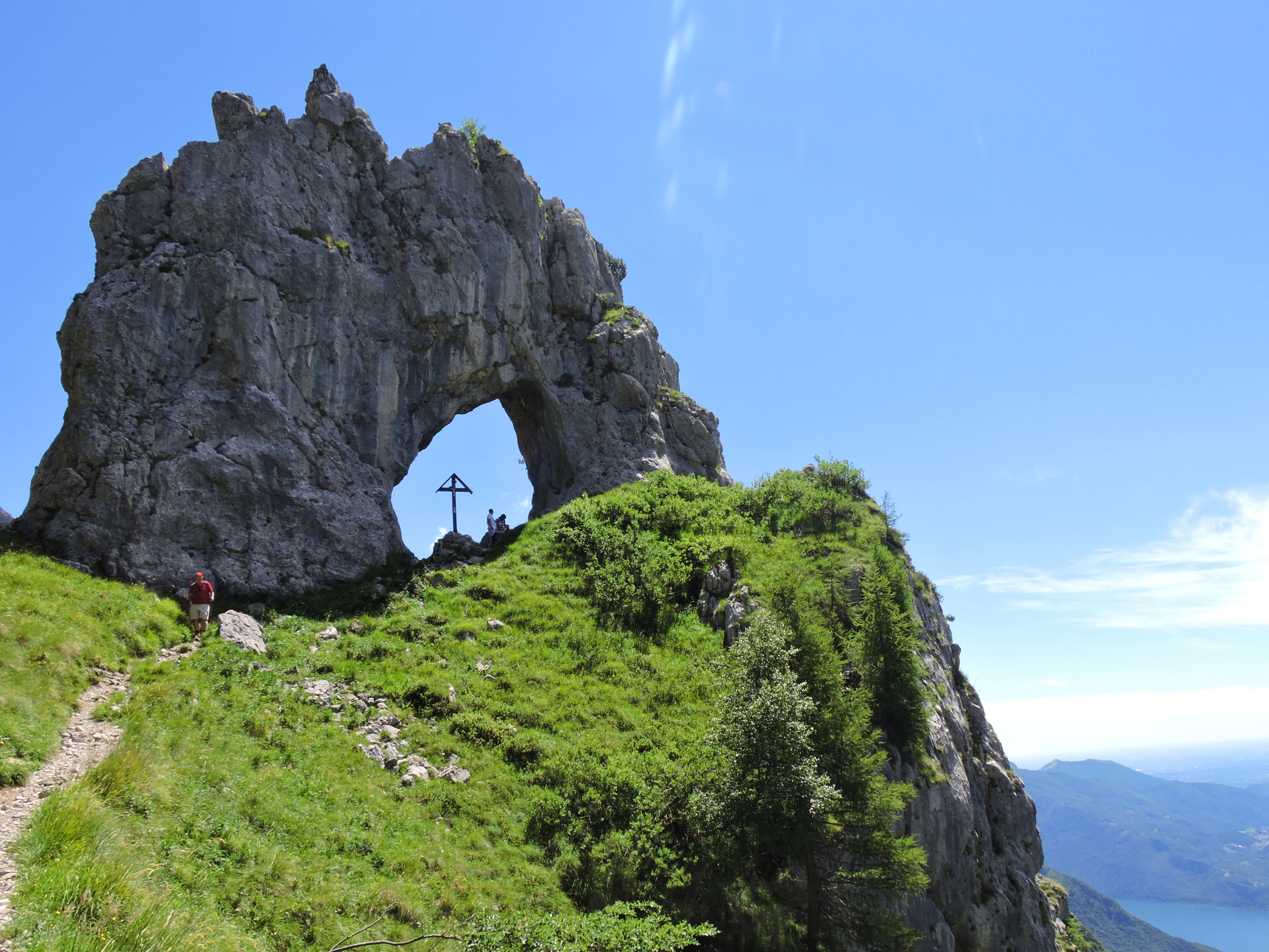
Porta di Prada, at Grigna Settentrionale (Grignone)

The Grigna Massif is located in the central Italian Alps on the eastern side of Lake Como in the province of Lecco, Lombardy. The two most important peaks are the Northern Grigna (2,399 m) and the Southern Grigna (2,181 m).

To the southwest, the Grigna massif descends precipitously toward an arm of Lake Como known as 'Ramo di Lecco' (The Branch of Lecco). To the east, the mountain rises gently through fields and forested land into Valsassina. The northern side of the mountain, which is known for its many caves and crevices, leads to Passo del Cainallo and the town of Esino Lario.

There is a natural park on the Northern side called Parco Regionale della Grigna Settentrionale. It encompasses the communities of Cortenova, Esino Lario, Parlasco, Pasturo, Perledo, Primaluna, Taceno and Varenna.

== Geology ==
The Grigna Massif landscape is characterised by karst landforms like dolines, shafts and karren (micro-karsts). The karst system has been cut and eroded by quaternary glaciation. The area is renowned for its caves and in some caves ice is still present. Leonardo Da Vinci was among the first to note this. The “Abisso W le Donne” is among the deepest and most famous caves.(1,160 m deep).

== Flora ==
Among the floristic rarities of the park are the Rhaetian Centaurea (Centaurea rhaetica), the Aquilegia of Einsele (Aquilegia einseleana), Campanula of Bertola (Campanula bertolae), the yellow colombine (Corydalis lutea), the Radicchiella of Froelich (Crepis froelichiana), the Citiso insubrico (Cytisus emeriflorus), the Euphorbia insubrica (Euphorbia variabilis), the Festuca ticinese (Festuca ticinesi), the Ambretta sudalpina (Knautia transalpina), the Laserpizio insubrico (Laserpitidumniti), the Insubric dandelion (Leontodon incanus), tufted horned rampion (Physoplexis comosa), Saxifraga retica (Saxifraga hostii), Tlaspi with round leaves (Thlaspi rotundifolium), Carice subalpina (Carex austroalpina) and Carice del Monte Baldo (Carex baldensis).

Among these "rare" species there are endemic species, not found elsewhere, even in locations comparable in terms of environment. They are remnants of the quaternary glaciation in the Lombard Pre-Alps from Lake Como to Garda, so-called "insubric endemics". Among them the Lombardic garlic (Allium insubricum), the Campanula di Rainer (Campanula Raineri), the Campanella dell'Insubria (Campanula elatinoides), the Silene d'Elisabetta (Silene elisabethae), the Erba regina (Telekia speciosissima), the yellow Primula (Primula glaucescens), symbol of the Park, the Sassifraga di Vandelli (Saxifraga vandellii) and the Viola di Duby (Viola dubyana), Minuartia delle Grigne (Minuartia grignensis) flowering between July and August above 1400m and the Primula delle Grigne (Primula grignensis) which flowers between May and July.

== Hiking and climbing routes ==
The mountain's relative isolation affords it panoramic views of Alps toward the north and on clear days, the Milan Cathedral can be seen to the southwest.

The easiest route to the Grignone peak is from the southeast starting at the town of Ballabio in Valsassina. Farther up the valley is Pasturo, another traditional trailhead for the ascent.

Hiking from Esino Lario crosses the most important cave areas and allows one to observe the geomorphological features of the area.

The Rifugio Brioschi, a mountain hut offering food and accommodation, sits on the Grignone peak and is open most of the year. Other shelters lower down on the massif, include Rifugio Bietti, Rifugio Arnaldo Bogani, Rifugio Pialeral, and Rifugio Rosalba.

== Society and culture ==
Every year in September, Grigna hosts a Skyrunning event known as the "Trofeo Scaccabarozzi", which starts and finishes in Pasturo. The route passes over Grigna Meridionale and Grigna Settrionale and covers a distance of 43 km.

Sergio “Gigi” Sala from Casatenovo was the first person to reach the summit using only his hands and without any protections in 1988.
