= Pietro Pensa =

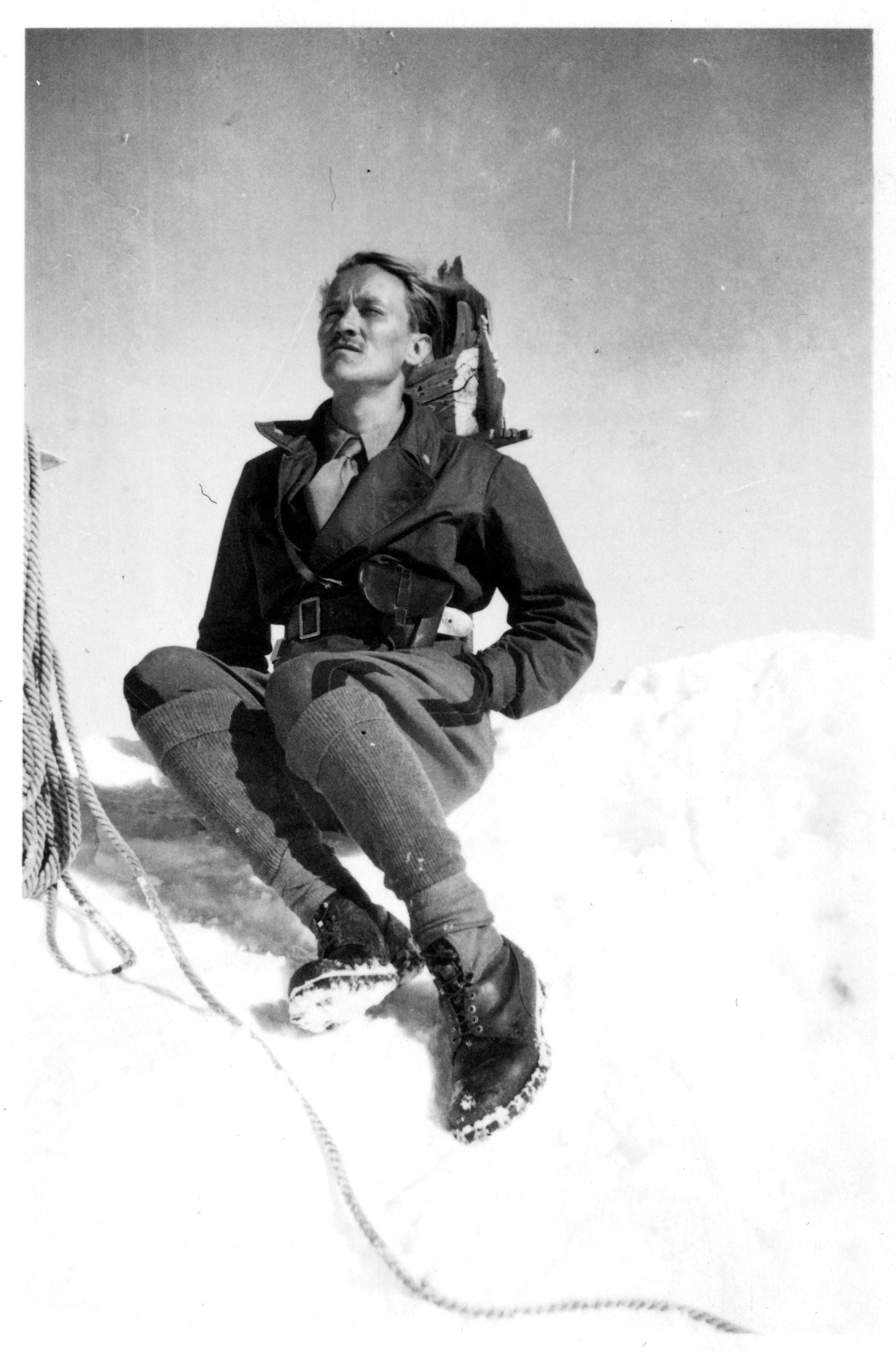
Pietro Pensa

Pietro Pensa (Esino Lario, 1906 – Bellano, 1996) was an Italian civil engineer and historian, who served as mayor of Esino Lario.

He contributed scholarly work about the history, culture and environment around Lake Como mainly featuring Valsassina, Lecco and Esino Lario.

== Bibliography ==
- Pietro Buzzoni, Andrea Spandri, Giuseppe Carì, Calcare d'autore, arrampicare nella Grigna dimenticata e sconosciuta, Comunità Montana Valsassina, Val Varrone, Val d'Esino e Riviera e il Parco Regionale della Grigna Settentrionale, editore Bellavite, 2007. Il libro è dedicato a Pietro Pensa.
- Eugenio Pesci, Grigne for ever (con foto di Pietro Buzzoni, Fabio Cameroni, Riky Felderer e Marino Marzorati) in "Alp", n. 247, 11/2007, pp. 54–61.
- Carlo Maria Pensa, Pietro Pensa raccontato dal figlio Carlo Maria in Pietro Pensa in L'adda, il nostro fiume, volume III, edizioni cultura "il punto stampa", c-b-r-s. editrice Lecco, 1997, pp. 9–15.
- Barbara Garavaglia, L'addio a Pietro Pensa, grande storico dell'Adda in "Il Resegone", n. 40, 25 October 1996.
- Federico Cereghini Ricordo di Pietro Pensa in "il confine", November 1996, p. 7.
- Giuseppe Leone, Pubblicato, a un anno dalla morte, l'ultimo volume della trilogia di Pietro Pensa. L'Adda il nostro fiume. Un'opera che mancava, ora il territorio è meno povero, in Asfat, Anno II, n.4, December 1997.
- Rosaria Marchesi, È in corsa col tempo: L'intensa vita dell'ing. Pietro Pensa in "Corriere della Provincia", 11/07/1988.
- Giuseppe Leone, Pietro Pensa, uno storico attento e appassionato. Collocò la religiosità dell'Adda fra tradizione cristiana e moralismo romano su "Ricorditi di me...", in Lecco 2000, Lecco gennaio 1998.
