= San Pietro, Ortanella =

Church in Lombardy, Italy

Coordinates: 45.97691°N 9.31451°E

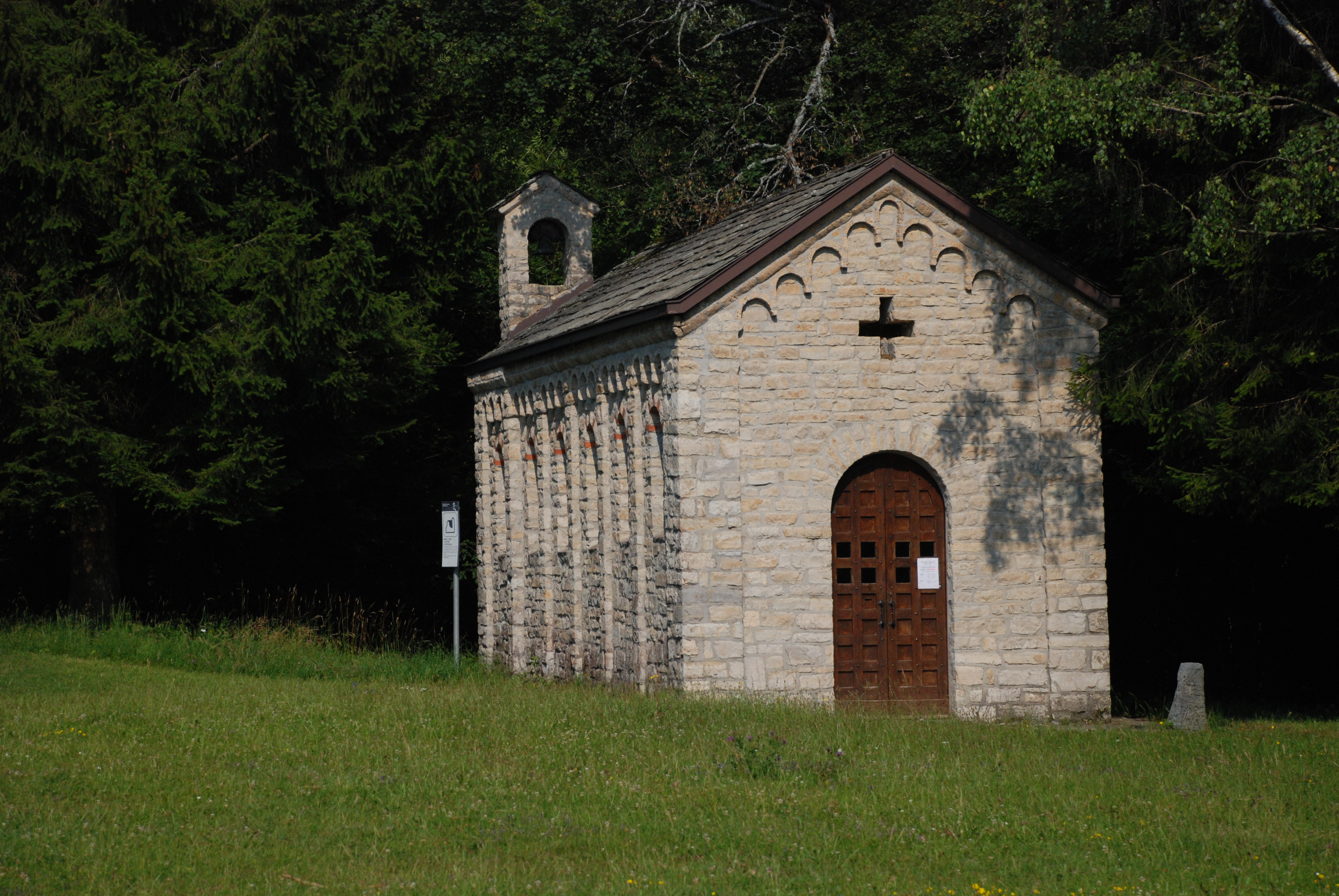
Church of St. Pietro in Ortanella

San Pietro is a parish church in Ortanella, a frazione of Esino Lario, in the Province of Lecco in Lombardy, in northern Italy. It is located in a field adjacent to the trail that connects Esino Lario with Lierna, on a natural geographic balcony overlooking Lake Como, at an altitude of 996 meters (3,268 ft) above sea level. The Romanesque chapel is part of the San Vittore parish within the Roman Catholic Archdiocese of Milan.

The church has origins prior to the 13th century, as it is mentioned in a list made by the priest Goffredo da Bussero. Built of stone, it has the typical characteristics of a mountain chapel, with a front porch, rounded apse and a belfry. Inside, it has a simple nave accessible from a single wooden door of the west-facing facade. In 1927, it was restored by the Milanese family of Fontana and frescoed with a depiction of St. Peter, this work being that of Ezio Moioli.

== Bibliography ==
- Facaros, Dana; Pauls, Michael (2006). Lombardy & the Italian Lakes. New Holland Publishers. ISBN 978-1-86011-322-2.
