= Parlasco =

Parlasco Perlàsch (Lombard)
- Comune
- Comune di Parlasco
- Location within Italy Location within Lombardy
- Coordinates: 46°1′N 9°21′E
- Country: Italy
- Region: Lombardy
- Province: Province of Lecco (LC)

Area
  - Total: 3.0 km^{2} (1.2 sq mi)

Population (Dec. 2004)
  - Total: 147
  - Density: 49/km^{2} (130/sq mi)
- Time zone: UTC+1 (CET)
  - Summer (DST): UTC+2 (CEST)
- Postal code: 22040
- Dialing code: 0341
- Website: Official website

Parlasco (Valassinese Lombard: Perlàsch) is a comune (municipality) in the Province of Lecco in the Italian region of Lombardy, about 60 kilometres (37 mi) north of Milan and about 20 kilometres (12 mi) north of Lecco. As of 31 December 2004, it had a population of 147 and an area of 3.0 square kilometres (1.2 mi^{2}). Parlasco is one of the smallest Italian towns and it is located in the Parco Regionale della Grigna Settentrionale (Regional Park of the Northern Grigna) in Valsassina, just a few minutes from Lecco. It is on the main road connecting Lake Lecco to Valsassina and joins Alpe Cainallo with Cortenova.

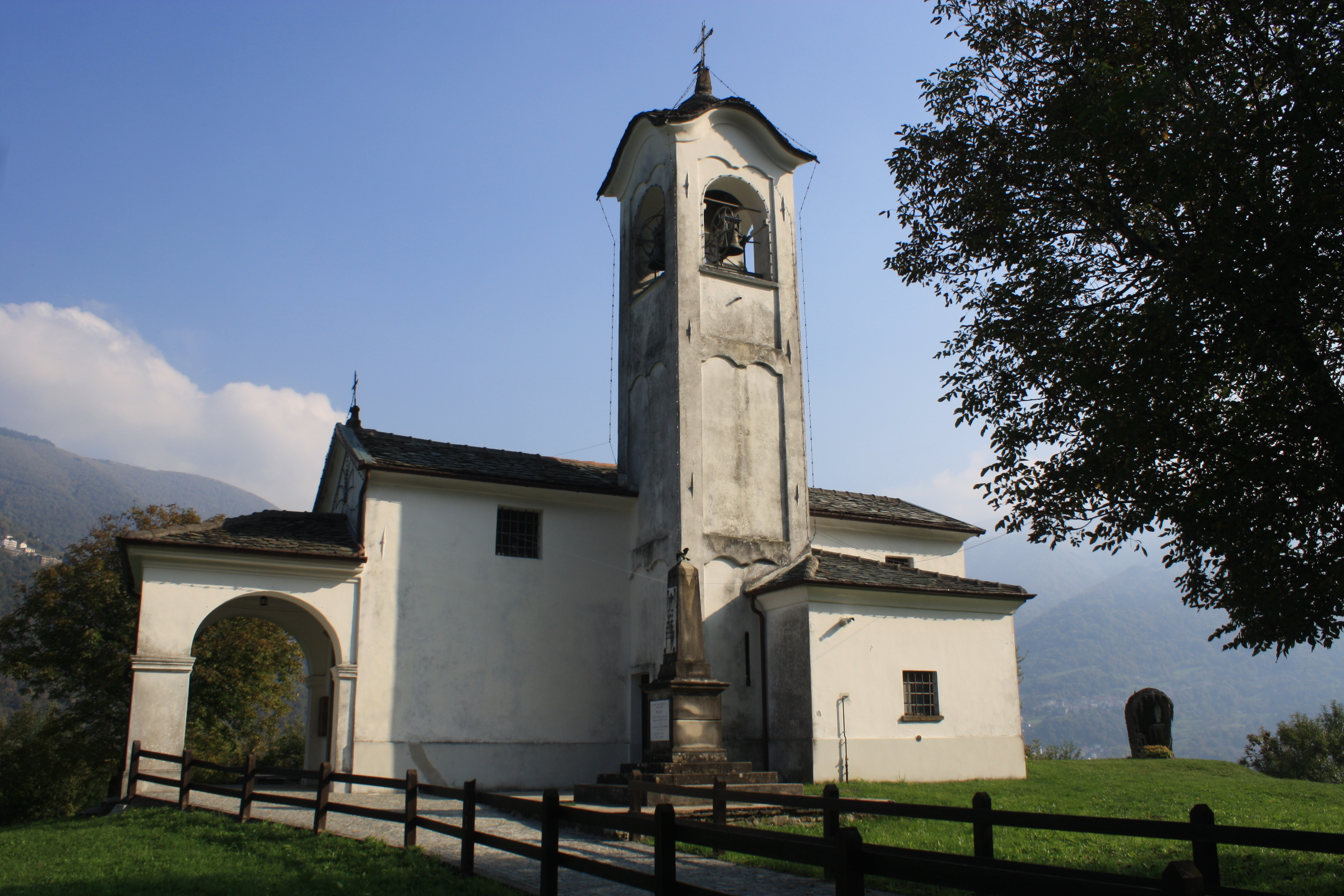
Church of Sant'Antonio Abate in Parlasco

Colourful frescoes on house walls tell the story of Lasco the bandit, taken from a historical novel set in the 17th century that tells of the difficult life of inhabitants who were at the mercy of historical events and popular beliefs and oppressed by local landlords. The church of S. Antonio Abate. with paintings dating back to the 15th century, is also of interest.

Parlasco borders the following municipalities: Bellano, Esino Lario, Perledo, Taceno, Vendrogno.

== Demographic evolution ==
Historical population

| Year | Pop. | ±% |
|---|---|---|
| 1861 | 151 | — |
| 1871 | 169 | +11.9% |
| 1881 | 170 | +0.6% |
| 1901 | 147 | −13.5% |
| 1911 | 177 | +20.4% |

| Year | Pop. | ±% |
|---|---|---|
| 1921 | 180 | +1.7% |
| 1931 | 194 | +7.8% |
| 1936 | 189 | −2.6% |
| 1951 | 205 | +8.5% |
| 1961 | 190 | −7.3% |

| Year | Pop. | ±% |
|---|---|---|
| 1971 | 171 | −10.0% |
| 1981 | 146 | −14.6% |
| 1991 | 133 | −8.9% |
| 2001 | 146 | +9.8% |

Source: Data from ISTAT
