= Esino Lario =

Municipality in Lombardy, Italy

- Comune
- Comune di Esino Lario
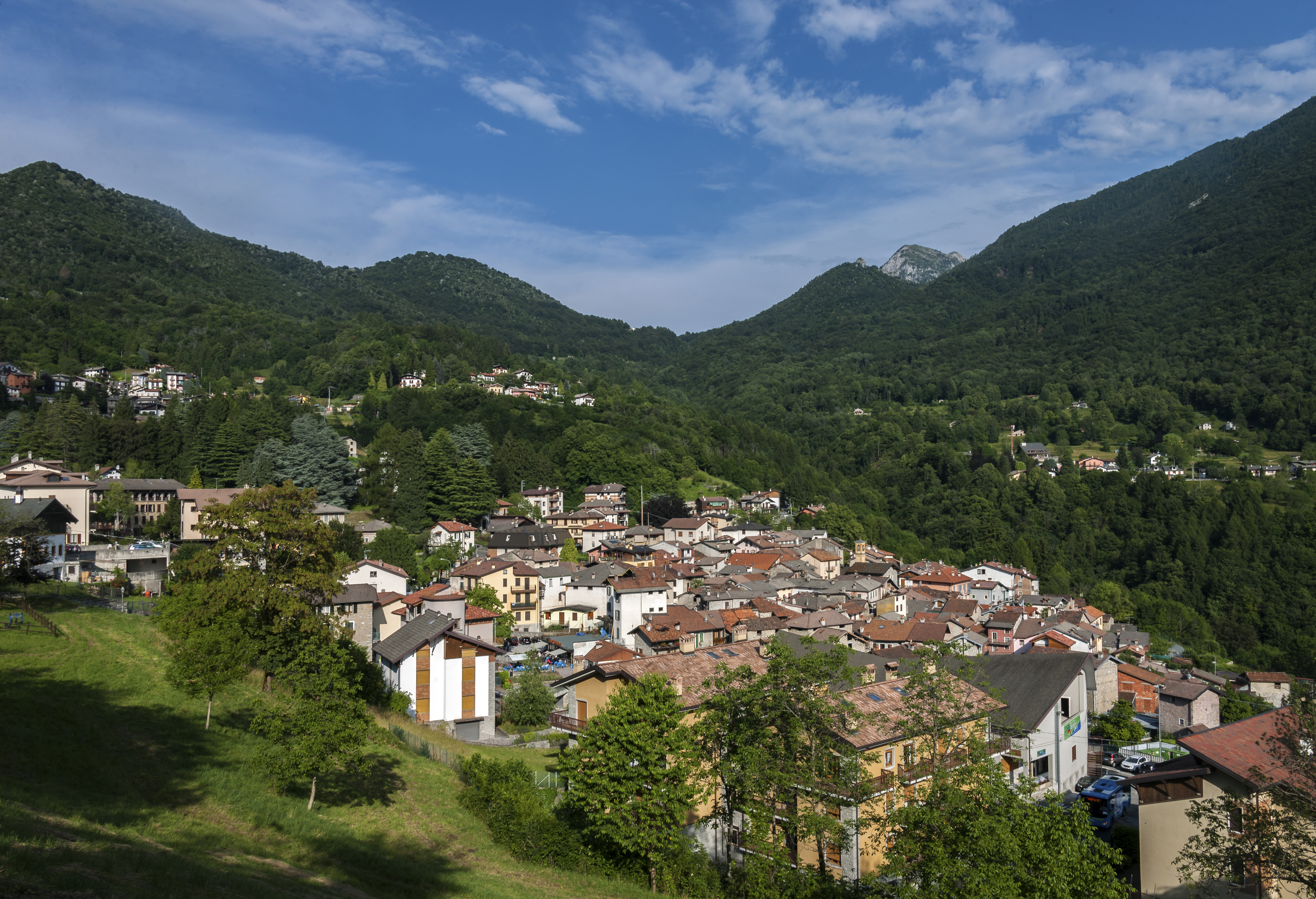
- Lower Esino Lario

- Location in the province of Lecco

- Location within Italy Location within Lombardy
- Coordinates: 45.9945°N 9.3327°E
- Country: Italy
- Region: Lombardy
- Province: Lecco (LC)
- Frazioni: Bigallo, Ortanella

Government
  - Mayor: Pietro Pensa

Area
  - Total: 18.05 km^{2} (6.97 sq mi)
- Elevation: 913 m (2,995 ft)

Population (31 July 2017)
  - Total: 747
  - Density: 41.4/km^{2} (107/sq mi)
- Demonym: Esinesi
- Time zone: UTC+1 (CET)
  - Summer (DST): UTC+2 (CEST)
- Postal code: 23825
- Dialing code: 0341
- Patron saint: St. Victor
- Saint day: 8 May
- Website: Official website

Esino Lario (Italian pronunciation: [ˈeːzino ˈlaːrjo]; Lecchese: Esin [ˈeːzĩ]; locally Isen [ˈiːzẽ]) is a municipality (comune) of the Province of Lecco in the Italian region of Lombardy. It is about 60 kilometres (37 mi) north of Milan, 15 kilometres (9.3 mi) northwest of Lecco, and about 4.3 kilometres (2.7 mi) from the eastern shore of Lake Como.

The area around Esino Lario is surrounded by Alpine mountains, where the karst landscape has produced sink-holes and caves, including the "Icebox of Moncodeno". The municipality is part of the Mountain Community of Valsassina, Valvarrone, Val d'Esino, and Riviera and is entirely within the "Regional Park of Northern Grigna" (Parco delle Grigna Settentrionale).

Esino Lario borders the municipalities of Cortenova, Lierna, Mandello del Lario, Parlasco, Pasturo, Perledo, Primaluna, Taceno, and Varenna.

== Geography ==
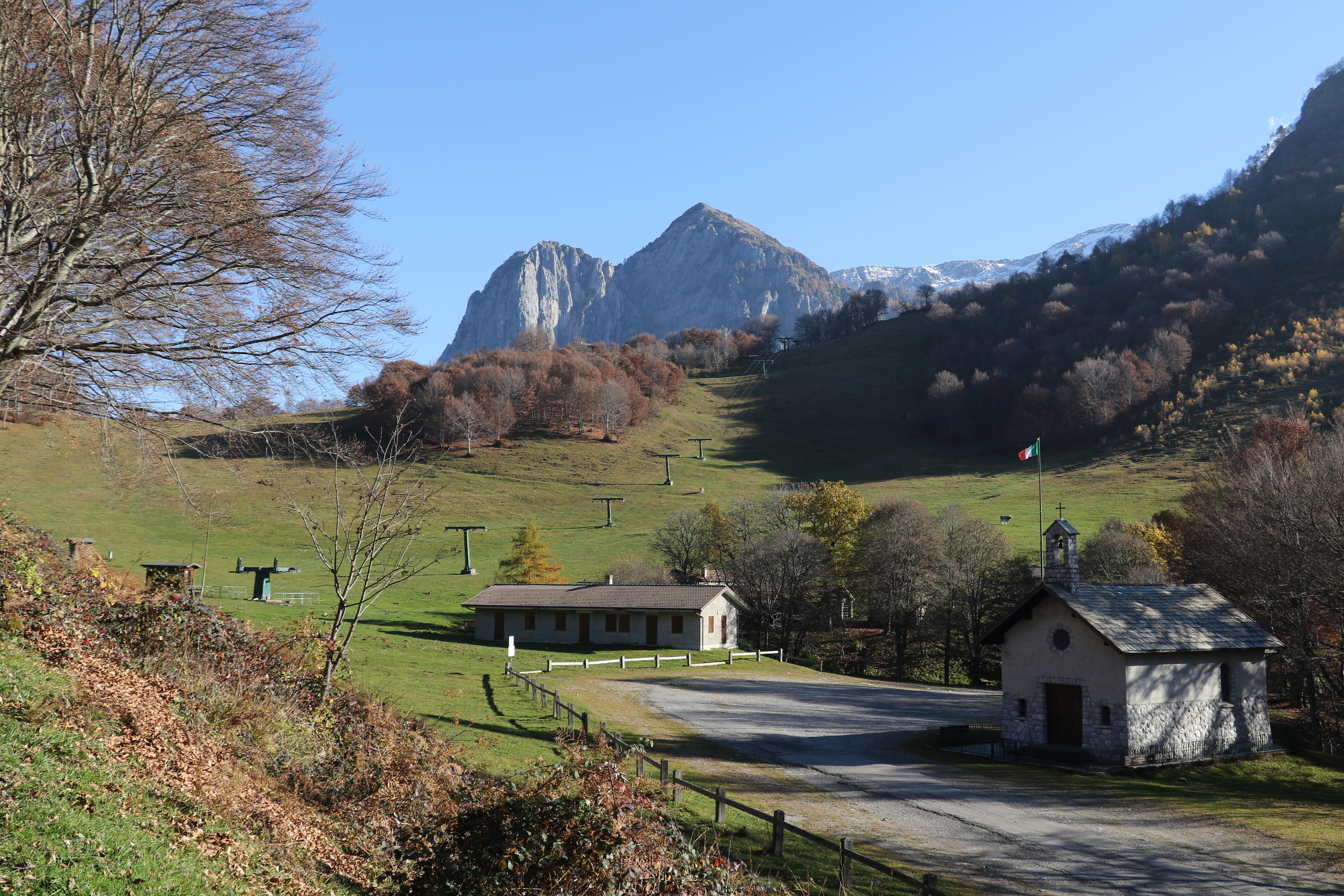
Cainallo

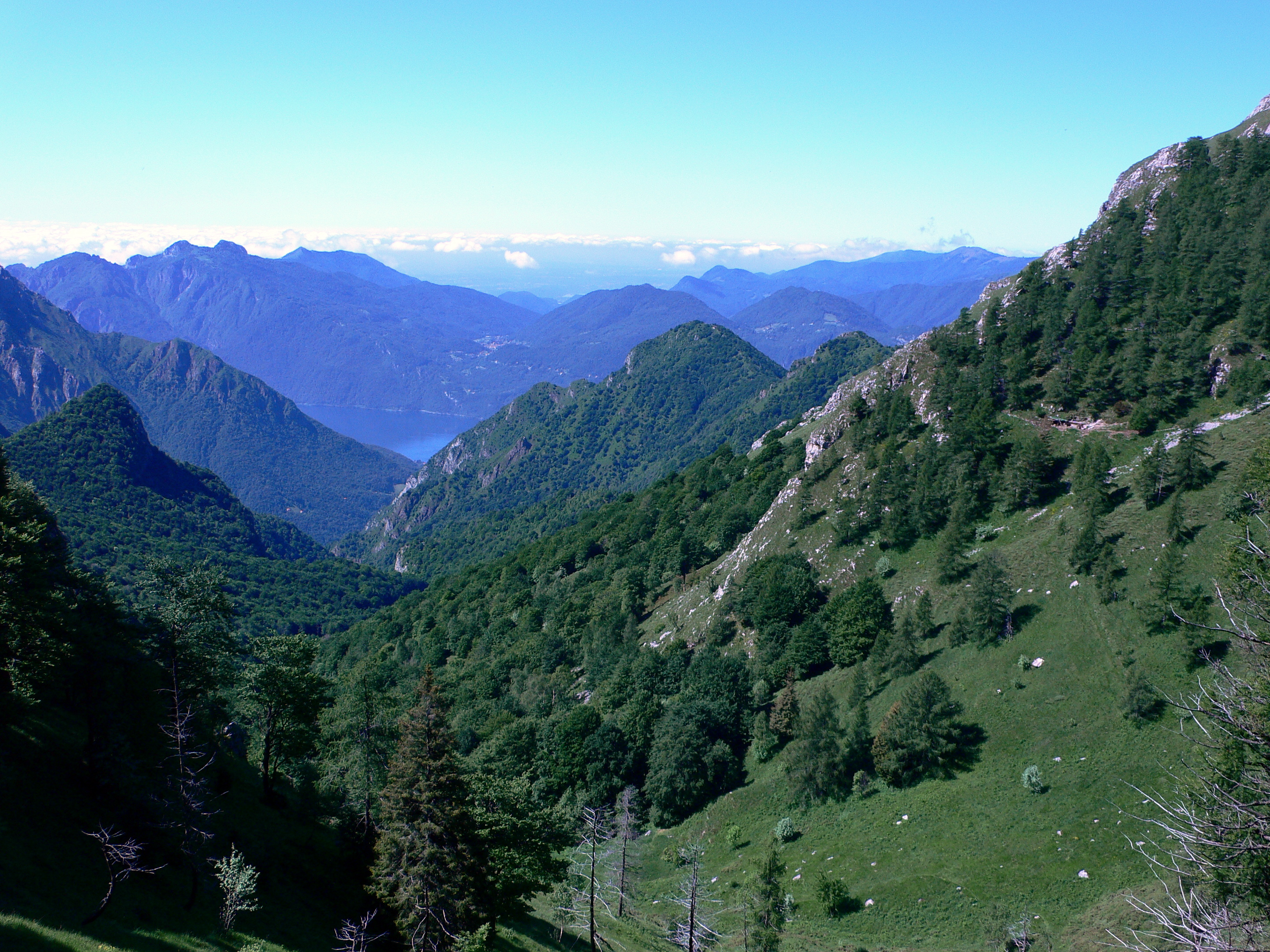
Esino Lario from Grigna

The town is located in the Alpine foothills along the north-eastern slopes of the Grigna mountain group, 4.3 kilometres (2.7 mi) from the eastern shore of Lake Como. It is located at the head of the small valley of Valsassina. The town consists of two distinct centres: Upper Esino and Lower Esino, located at an elevation of around 900 metres (3,000 ft); other minor localities within the municipality are Cainallo, at almost 1,300 metres (4,300 ft) above sea level, and Ortanella, at a little less than 1,000 metres (3,300 ft).

The district is entirely mountainous: the lowest point reached is 554 metres (1,818 ft), while the highest point is the summit of Grigne, 2,409 metres (7,904 ft). The presence of dolomite (rocks composed of calcium carbonate and magnesium) in the area, common to the rest of the foothills of the Alps of Lombardy, has led to the presence of numerous karst areas within the municipality.

Geographical features include the Moncodeno, an extensive natural amphitheater located on the north of the northern Grigna at an altitude of between 1,700 metres (5,600 ft) and 2,300 metres (7,500 ft), characterised by the presence of a large number of sinkholes (depressions in the ground) and almost 500 caves, formed by the combined action of the karst and erosion by ice that covered the area during the ice ages. In one of these caves, the Icebox of Moncodeno, are deposits of underground ice.

The locality is also characterised by the abundant presence of marine fossil deposits, a result of the geological history of the Alpine foothills, which emerged from the sea during the tectonic movements of the Alpine orogeny in the Cenozoic era. These deposits have long been studied by palaeontologists; among the first interested scholars was the geologist and palaeontologist Antonio Stoppani during the 19th century.

=== Climate ===
Esino Lario, like most of the Valsassina valley, features a humid, temperate climate, cooler than in the Po Valley due to the higher elevations. At the nearest weather station, in Barzio, (elevation 770 metres (2,530 ft) — Esino Lario's elevation is about 100 metres (330 ft) higher), mean annual temperature is around 10 °C/50 °F (compare, for example, with around 13 °C (55 °F) in Milan). Precipitation is abundant, with more than 1,700 millimetres (67 in) falling in an average year. Rainfall is frequent in every season, with a little less in winter when there can be snowfall. As in most temperate climates, there are prolonged and well-defined intermediate seasons.

Summers are moderate, with frequent rain showers and thunderstorms. Mean summer temperature is around 19 °C (66 °F), higher in July and August, and slightly lower in June; even during the most intense heat waves, maximum temperatures rarely exceed 32 °C (90 °F). Winters are quite mild; the average temperature for December, January, and February is around 1–2 °C (34–36 °F), more or less the same temperature recorded in the Po Valley at much lower elevations. This is due to the phenomenon of inversion (a deviation from the normal atmospheric behaviour, where temperature increases with elevation) frequently observed in midwinter when subtropical high-pressure systems reach northern Italy. Winters can become snowy, as extratropical cyclones carry moist and cool air from the North Atlantic.

Climate data for Esino Lario as of 2014
Month	Jan	Feb	Mar	Apr	May	Jun	Jul	Aug	Sep	Oct	Nov	Dec	Year
Mean daily maximum °C (°F)	8 (46)	10 (50)	15 (59)	17 (63)	22 (72)	25 (77)	28 (82)	27 (81)	22 (72)	17 (63)	12 (54)	8 (46)	18 (64)
Mean daily minimum °C (°F)	−1 (30)	0 (32)	3 (37)	6 (43)	11 (52)	14 (57)	16 (61)	16 (61)	12 (54)	8 (46)	3 (37)	−1 (30)	7 (45)
Average precipitation mm (inches)	67 (2.6)	45 (1.8)	61.8 (2.43)	146.8 (5.78)	164.8 (6.49)	179.3 (7.06)	149.9 (5.90)	148.7 (5.85)	170.1 (6.70)	144.8 (5.70)	143.1 (5.63)	73.8 (2.91)	1,495.1 (58.85)
Average rainy days	9	6	7	14	16	14	11	13	11	13	12	10	136
Source: World Weather Online, as of 2014

== History ==
The municipality of Esino Lario was created in 1927 by the merger of the municipalities of Lower Esino and Upper Esino.

=== Prehistory, Celts and Romans ===
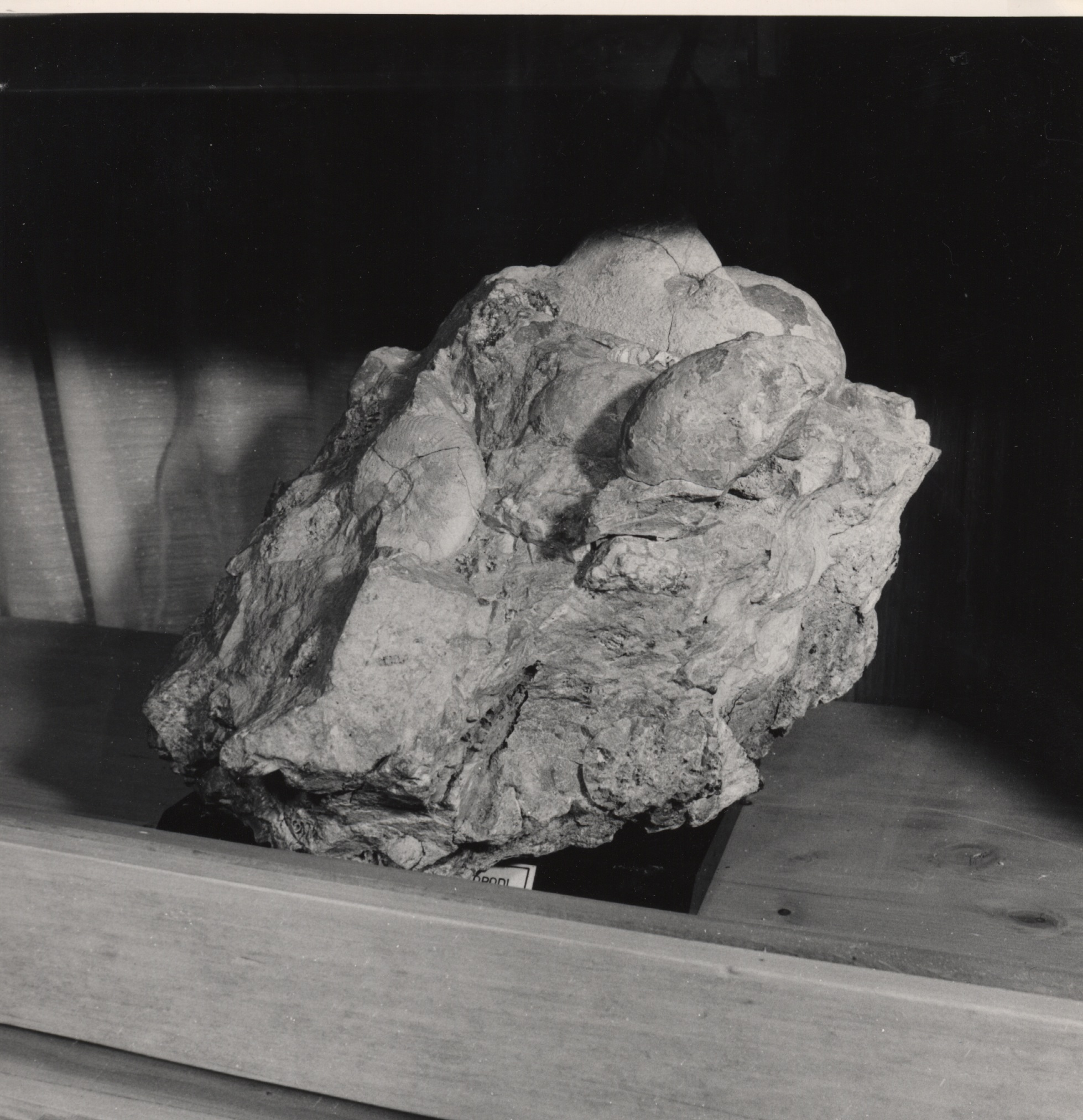
Fossils preserved in the Museum of Grigne

The last glaciation of the quaternary period, the Würm, began 70,000 years ago covering the Como area, and it profoundly changed the land's appearance – shaping the sides of the mountains, creating fertile moraine terraces, leaving many signs of its passage with boulders. The landscape of Esino Lario testifies to the Alpine orogeny with the presence of fossils, boulders, and caves.

Human presence in the territory is documented since the Neolithic period. Esino archaeological findings from the 5th century BC show that the area was a crossing point of the main road along the eastern shore of the lake, reaching Colico and the valleys of the Adda and Imera; because of overhanging rocks between Mandello and Bellano, from Lierna the road climbed to Ortanella (currently a frazione of Esino) subsequently declined to Vezio and Bellano. Archaeological finds testify numerous tombs and Celtic necropolis in Esino Lario. The area was a strategic point with detachments of warriors-pastors. During the late Western Roman Empire, to defend themselves from the incursions of the barbarians, the Romans prepared protective lines that communicated with each other by fires at night and smoke in the daytime. Castle Esino – of which only a tower remains – was one of the fortified points added to a defensive chain. Other archaeological finds with tombs buried document the period.

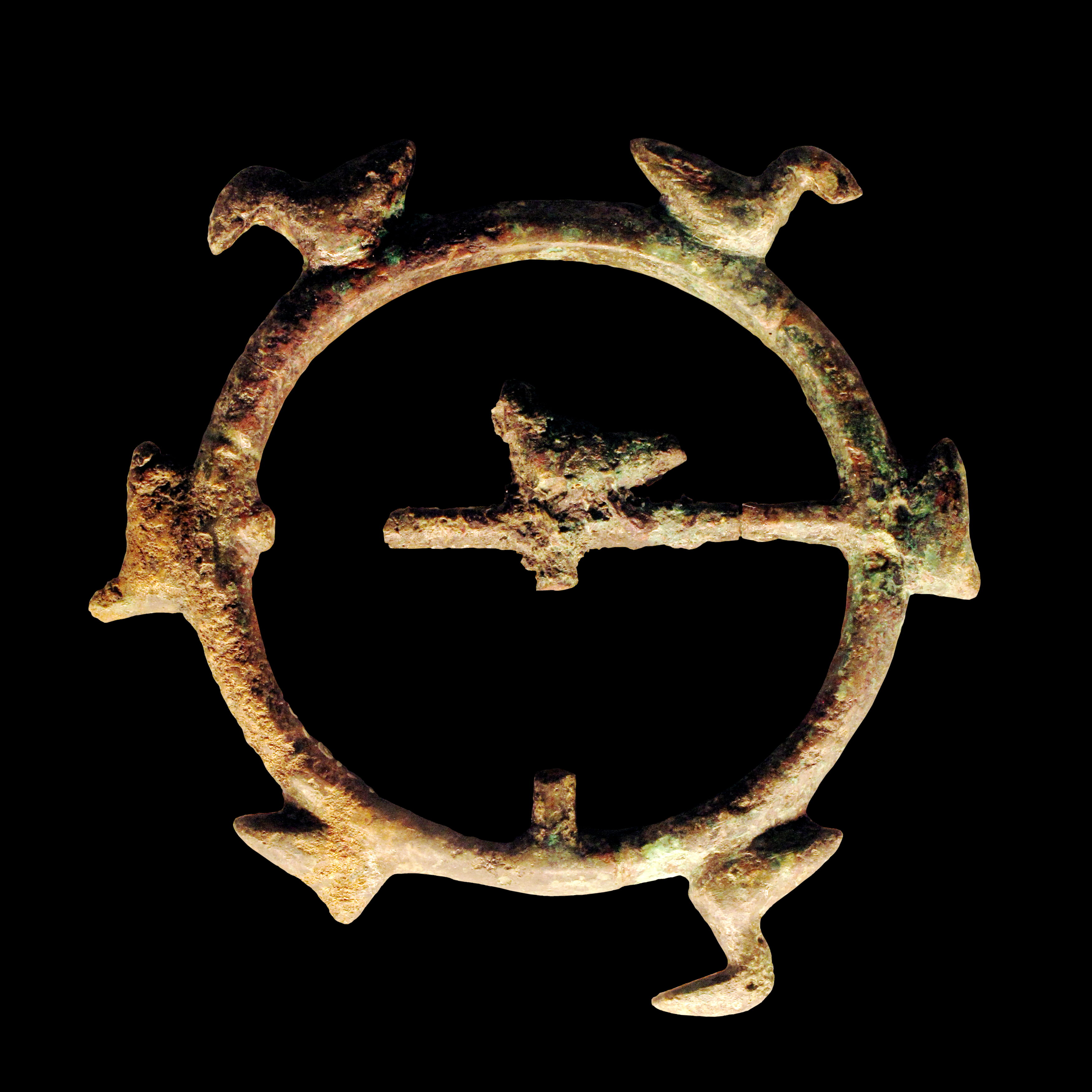
La Tène culture pendant decorated with ducks.

=== Middle Ages ===
At the fall of the Western Roman Empire, after the domination of Odoacer and of the Ostrogoths, the Byzantines conquered Italy during the Gothic War. Immediately after, however, the Lombards came down from Friuli and in 569 conquered Milan. A contingent from the Byzantine Empire, under the command of magister militum Francione, resisted in Esino Lario for 20 years, avoiding the large reprisals that followed the death of king Alboin and housing wealthy Roman refugees. In the end, Francione had to repair in Isola Comacina and, after six months of siege, surrender. The territory was finally conquered by the Lombard king Authari.

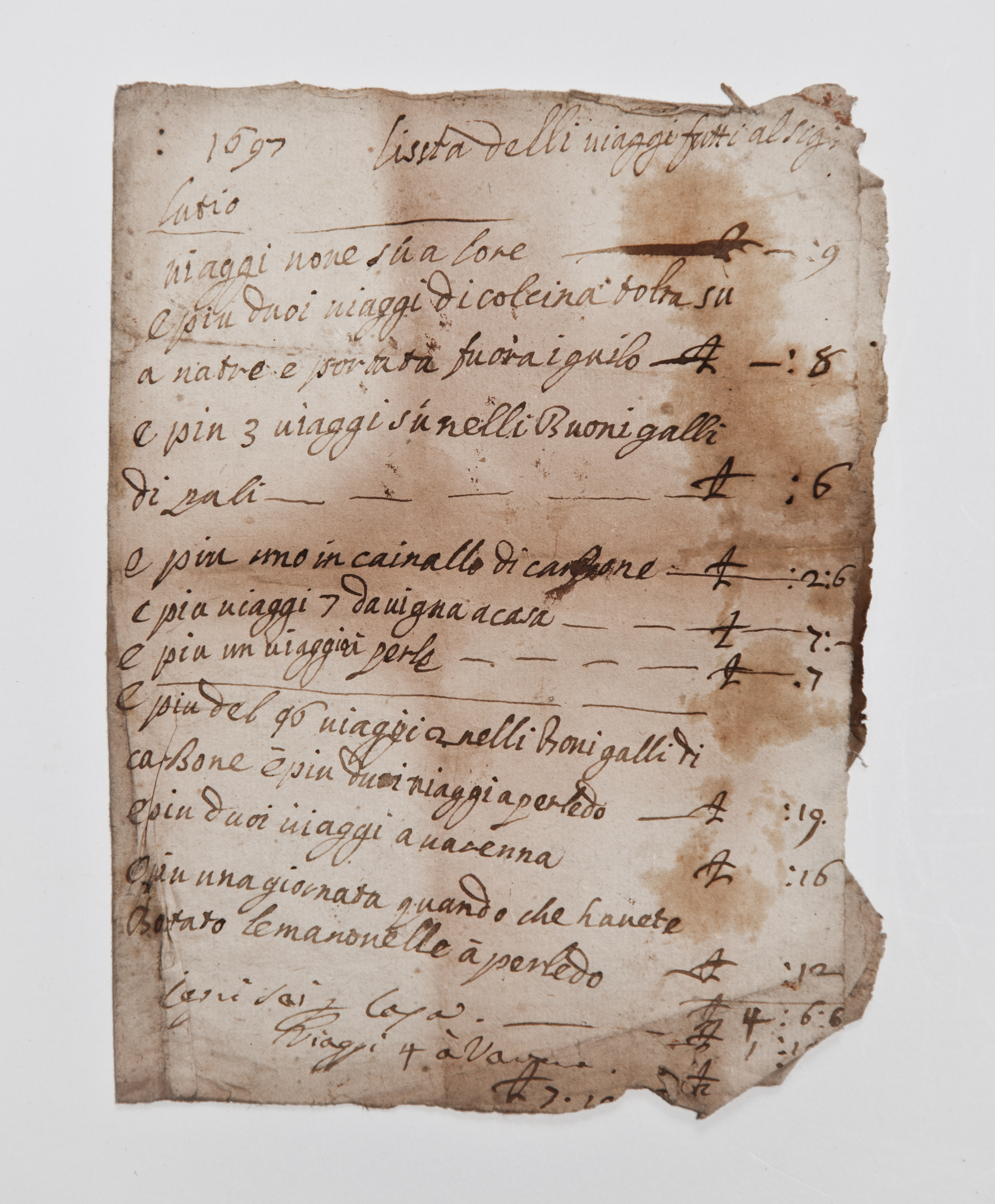
Private act granting self-rule to Esino Lario, 1697.

Towards the end of the 12th century, Esino Lario entered the General Community of Valsassina, a free commune. It lays its statutes, derived from ancient practices. Each village was administered by its board, formed by the heads of families. A unique representative of both Esino Superiore and Inferiore took part in the Council of the Community General, which was based in Introbio.

=== The Spanish domination ===
In the first decades of the sixteenth century, the eastern Lario was close to the armies involved in the dispute between France and Spain. An adventurer, Gian Giacomo Medici, attempted to form a principality on Lake Como and a fleet take long in check the forces of Francesco II Sforza. Bellano was plundered and famine raged in every village. A duke died without heirs, and Milan went to the Spanish in 1535. There followed two centuries of gradual decay: the archives of Esino reveal misery, oppression, robberies, and injustices. The only glimmer of light is the two pastoral visits of Charles Borromeo to Esino in 1565 and in 1582. The plague of 1630 claimed many victims in Valsassina; fifty in Esino. Along the rest of the century, then, was a continuous drip of starvation and hunger. In the late 17th century, despite the ancient privileges, Valsassina became a feud chamber.

=== Italian unification ===
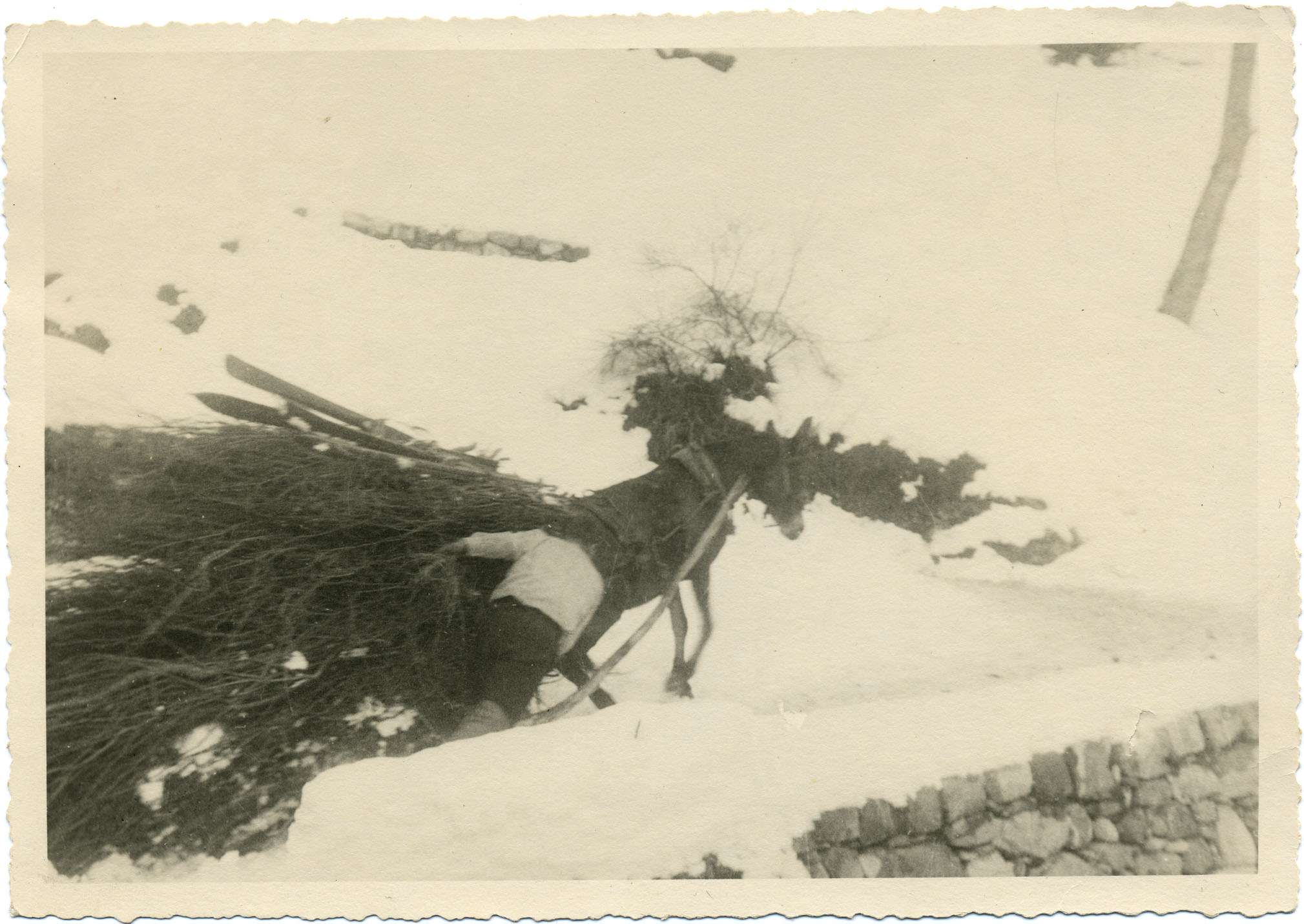
A man with a mule transporting bundles of wood at Ponte di Vigna

Although a small town and then very poor, Esino participated in the Risorgimento movement (Italian reunification). At the news of the revolt in Milan in 1848, a group came from Lecco and joined volunteers in the Esino Lario to come to the aid of the Milanese in their Five Days Rebellion. The first 50 years of the Kingdom of Italy were of economical crisis: wood was no longer required for the coal needed for melting furnaces, and could only be sold afar.

The reduction of glaciers was in progress, reducing the cultivated land, and population growth soon pushed emigration. Despite this decline, some public works were performed in the town: there were newly cobbled streets to the lake and to the mountain, and two aqueducts for public fountains were also constructed.

=== 20th century ===
After World War I, the local economy was boosted by the construction of a new agro-forestry-pastoral road, opened in 1925. The upper and lower municipalities merged in 1927 to form the new town of Esino Lario.

During late World War II, guerilla warfare against the Wehrmacht and RSI troops took place in the area. In 1958, the road from Lake Como was widened and paved, and in 1957 it reached Ortanella.

== Economy ==
Historically the main economic activity of Esino Lario is linked to the cultivation of forests of beech and hornbeam. Esino Lario was part of a group of local municipalities that provided charcoal for iron production in Valsassina. The management of the forests as a common good is a peculiarity of Esino compared to neighbouring territories; forests still belong to the city and are divided for use between residents and partially transmitted by hereditary right.

Tourism in Esino Lario began in the late 19th century with scholars coming to study the fossils of Grigne. During the 1970s, tourists coming in the summer period of each year reached 12,000. However, in the 1990s tourism began to decline, and the reducing snowfall meant the closure of skiing structures.

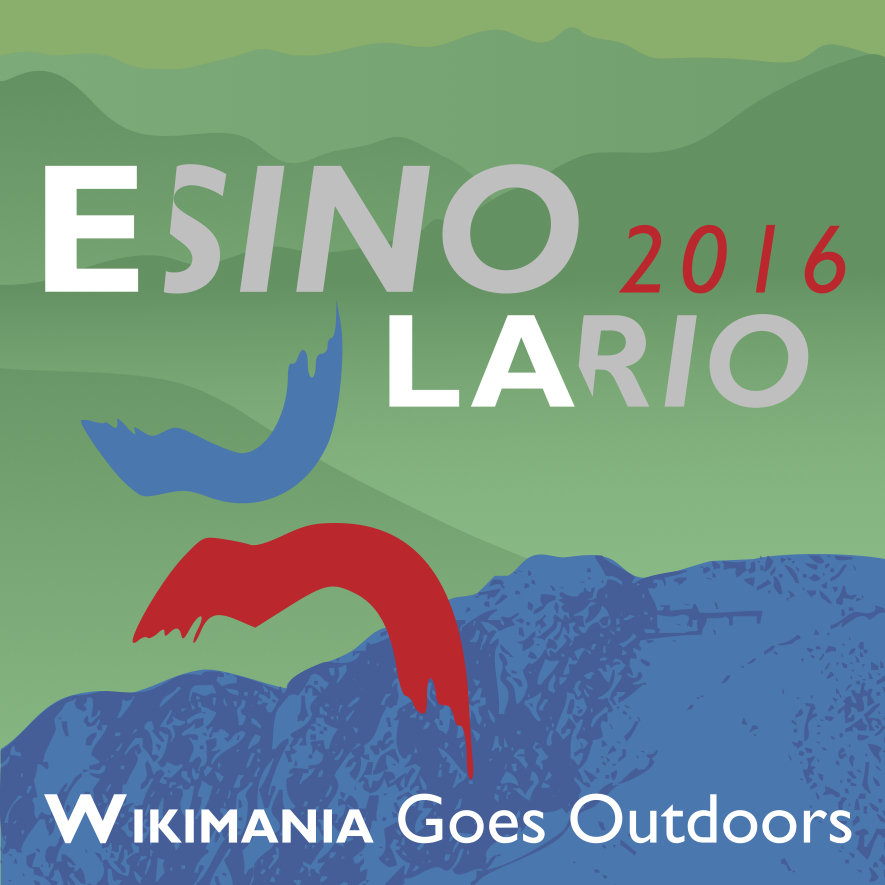
Logo for Wikimania 2016.

The town hosted Wikimania, an annual Wikimedia conference, in June 2016.

== Culture ==
- The Museum of Grigne was established in the 1930s. It details the evolution of man in the area from its origins until today. The museum is part of the Museum System of the province of Lecco.
- The Ecomuseum of Grigne is a municipal ecomuseum formed in 2008.
- Esino Lario is noted for its annual Saint John's Eve procession.

== Main sights ==
- Parish Church of San Vittore, dating from the fifteenth century.
- Church of St. Pietro in Ortanella
- Oratorio di San Nicolao. It houses a shrine of military victims of World War I and II.
- Villa Clotilde
- Esino Tower

== Transport ==
Esino Lario is served by the Strada Provinciale 65. The closest rail station is Varenna-Esino, 12 kilometres (7.5 mi) away.

== People ==
- Pietro Pensa, engineer and businessman, also the former mayor of Esino Lario
- Enrico Mino, General of the Army Corps, Commander of the Carabinieri, was born and buried in Esino Lario

== Gallery ==
View from the Bellevue over Esino Lario and the Lake Como

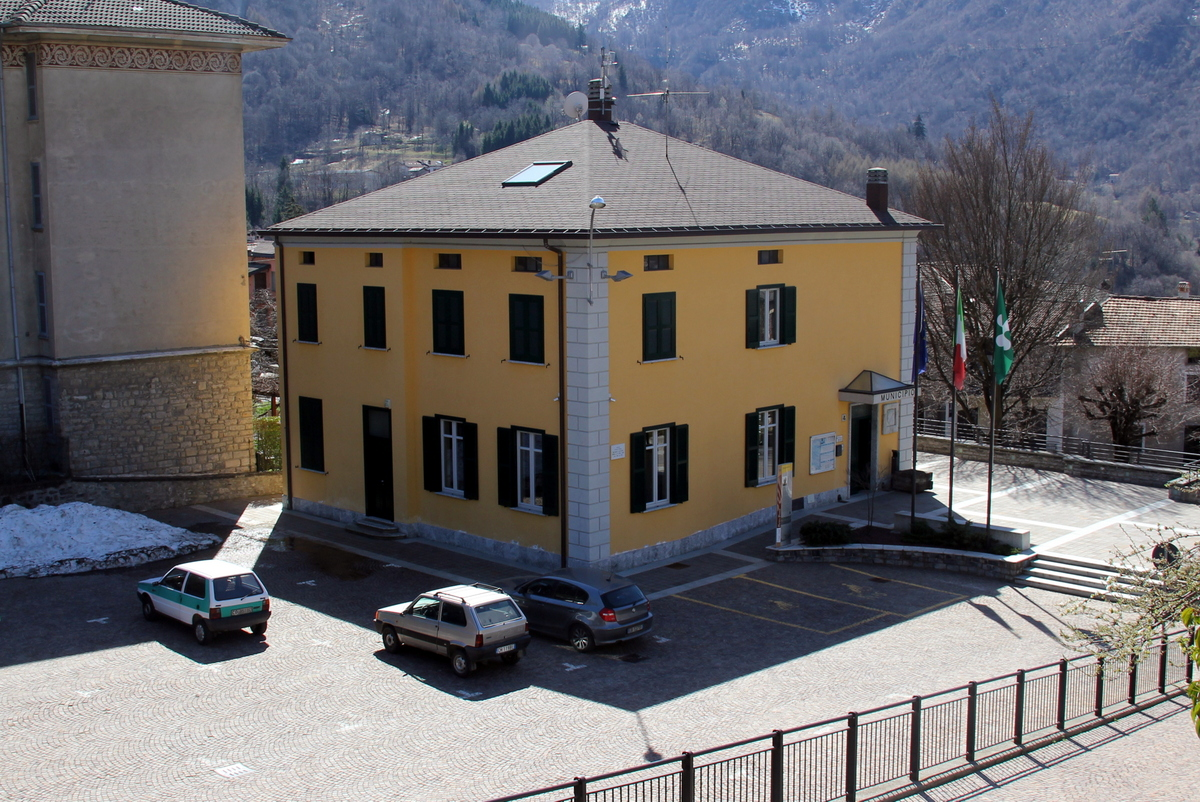
Esino Lario town hall

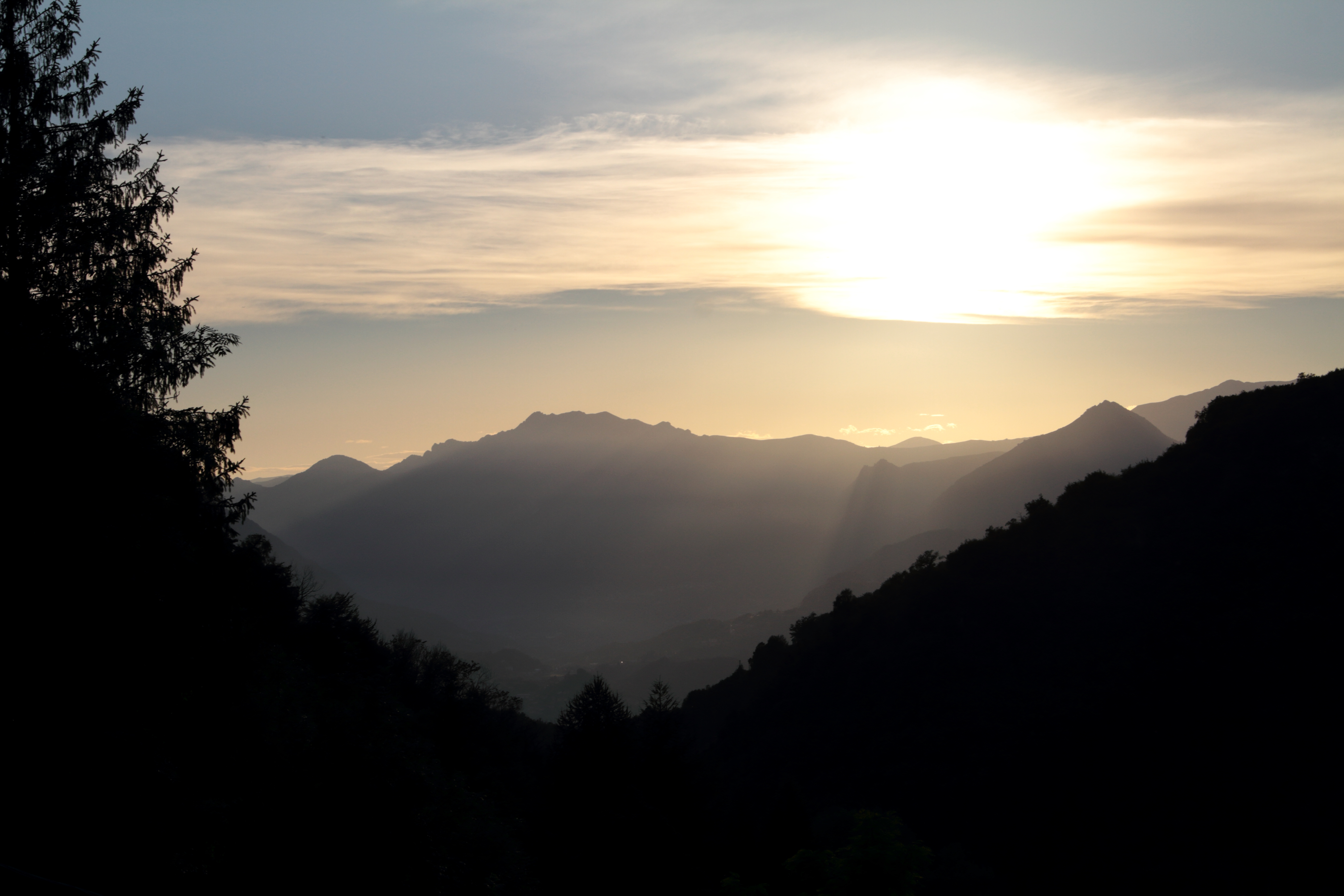
Sunset over Esino Lario

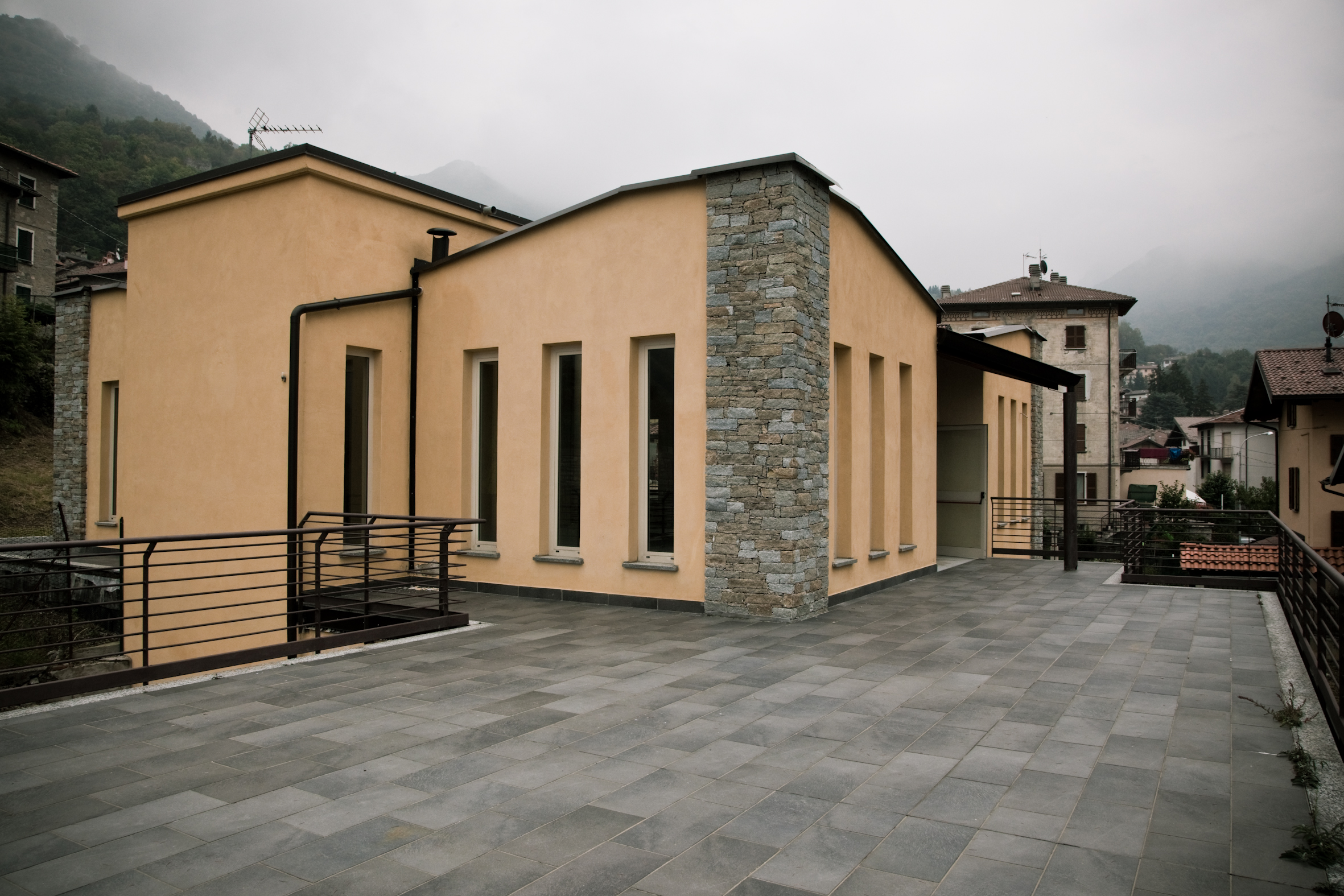
The Museum of Grigne

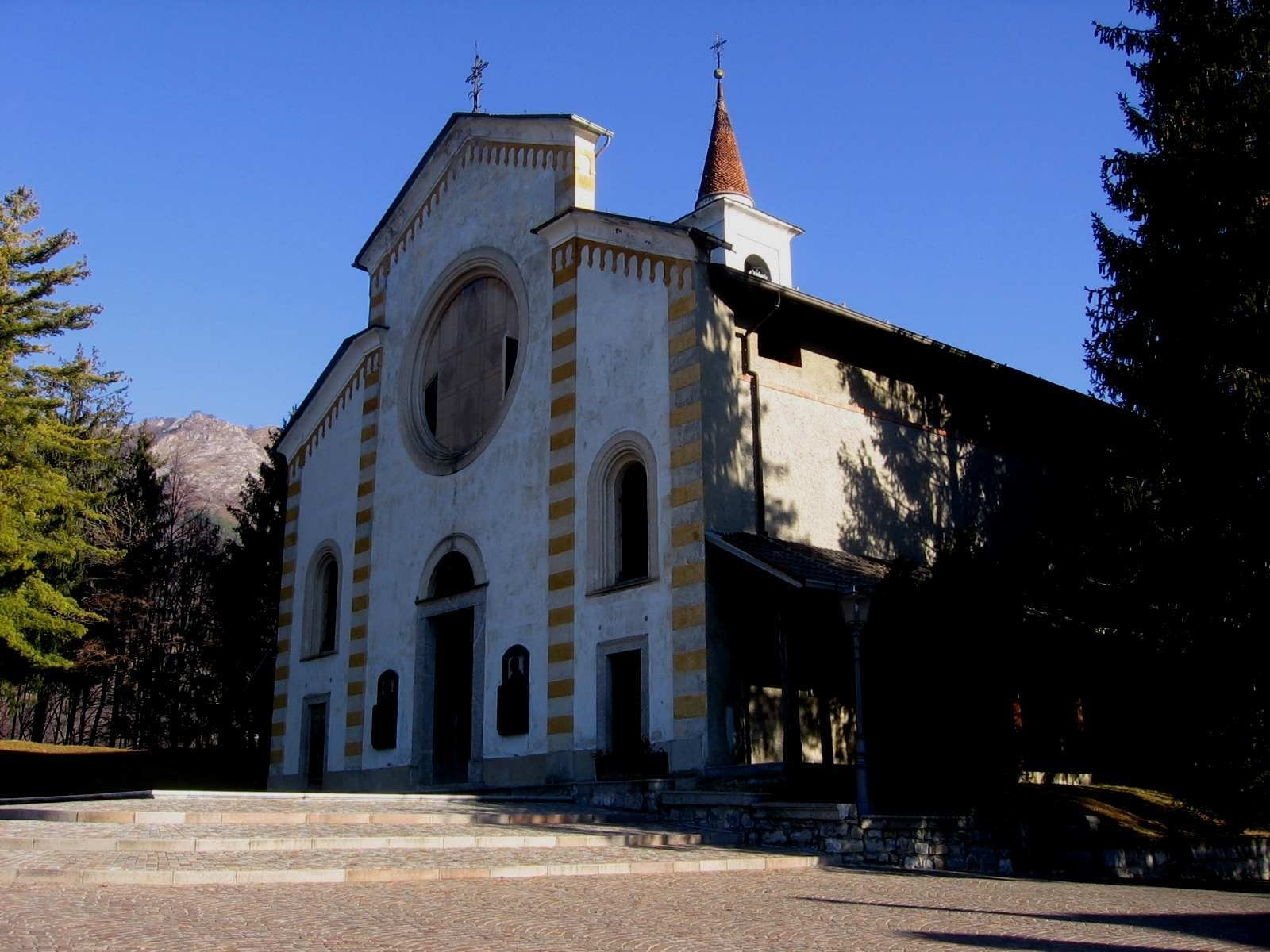
Church of San Vittore

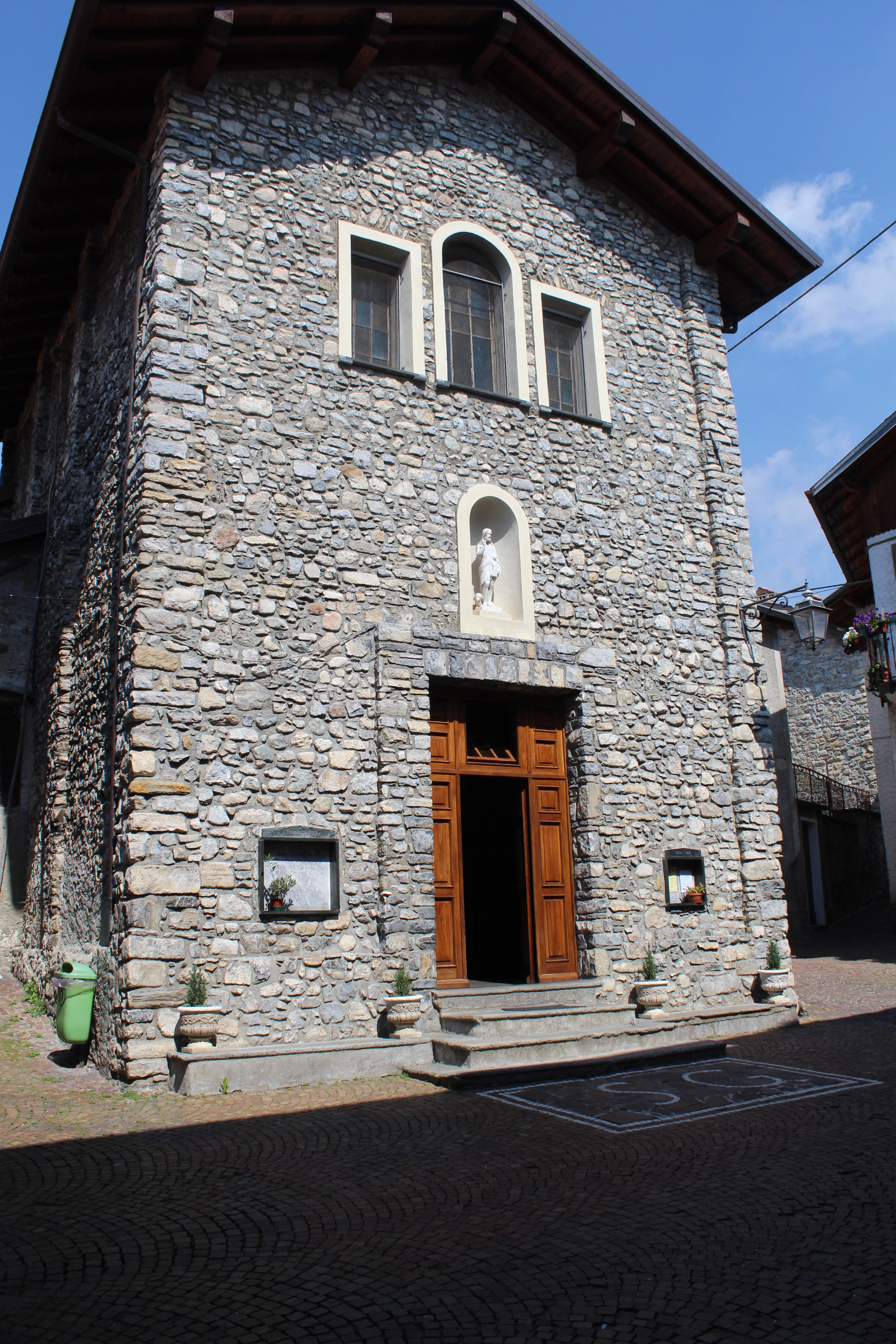
Church of San Giovanni in Esino Inferiorie

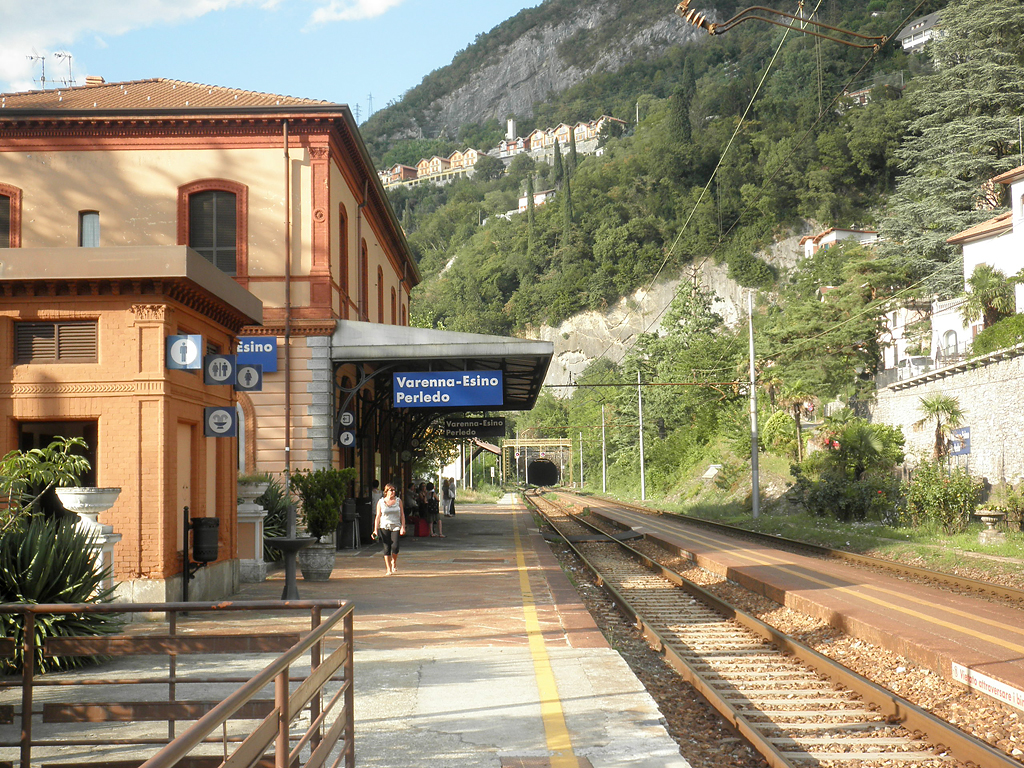
Varenna-Esino-Perledo station

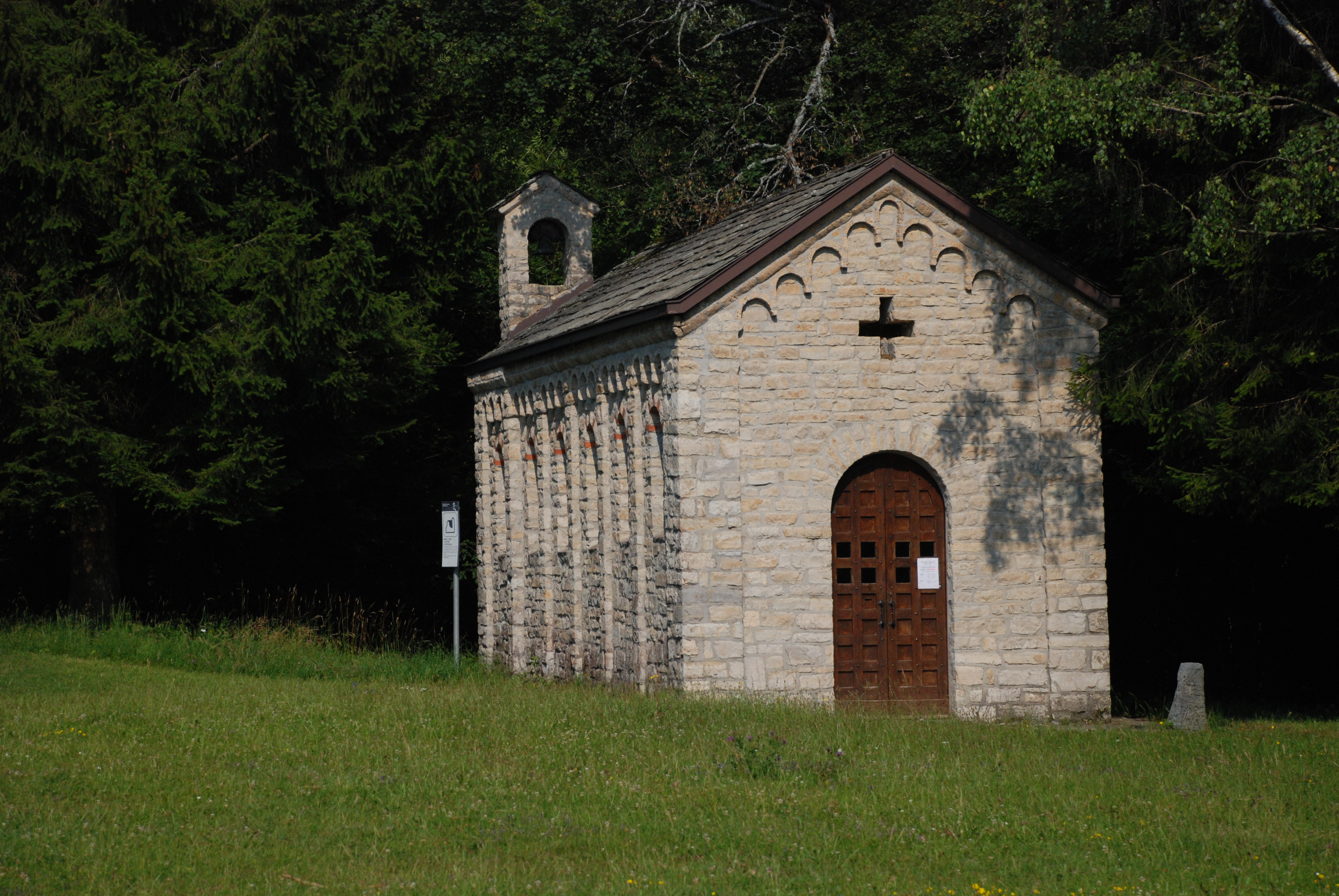
Church of St. Pietro in Ortanella

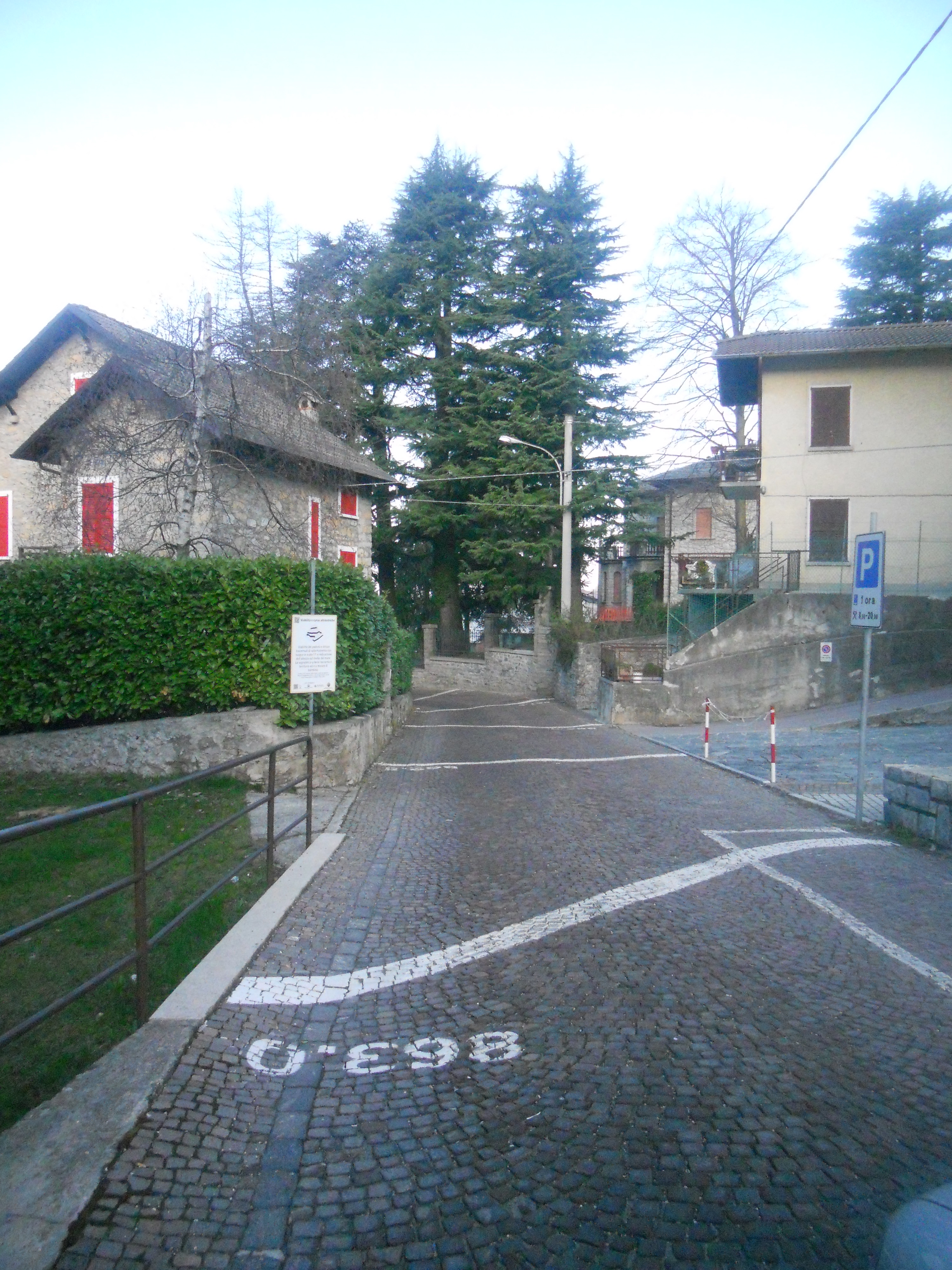
Urban design and site-specific art work in via Montefiori 19
