= Primaluna =

Primaluna Premalüne (Lombard)
- Comune
- Comune di Primaluna
- Location within Italy Location within Lombardy
- Coordinates: 45°58′N 9°26′E
- Country: Italy
- Region: Lombardy
- Province: Lecco (LC)
  - Mayor: (Mauro Artusi)

Area
  - Total: 22.8 km^{2} (8.8 sq mi)
- Elevation: 558 m (1,831 ft)

Population (31 December 2010)
  - Total: 2,170
  - Density: 95.2/km^{2} (247/sq mi)
- Demonym: Primalunesi
- Time zone: UTC+1 (CET)
  - Summer (DST): UTC+2 (CEST)
- Postal code: 22040
- Dialing code: 0341
- Website: Official website

Primaluna (Valassinese Lombard: Premalüne) is a comune (municipality) in the Province of Lecco in the Italian region Lombardy, located about 60 kilometres (37 mi) northeast of Milan and about 13 kilometres (8 mi) north of Lecco.

Primaluna borders the following municipalities: Casargo, Cortenova, Crandola Valsassina, Esino Lario, Introbio, Pasturo, Premana.

== Twin towns ==
Primaluna is twinned with:

- La Roche-Vineuse, France
