= Cortenova =

Cortenova Cornöva (Lombard)
- Comune
- Comune di Cortenova
- Location of Cortenova in Italy Cortenova (Lombardy)
- Coordinates: 46°0′N 9°23′E
- Country: Italy
- Region: Lombardy
- Province: Lecco (LC)

Government
  - Mayor: Valerio Benedetti

Area
  - Total: 11.6 km^{2} (4.5 sq mi)
- Elevation: 483 m (1,585 ft)

Population (1 January 2014)
  - Total: 1,240
  - Density: 107/km^{2} (277/sq mi)
- Demonym: Cortenovesi
- Time zone: UTC+1 (CET)
  - Summer (DST): UTC+2 (CEST)
- Postal code: 22040
- Dialing code: 0341
- Website: Official website

Cortenova (Valassinese Lombard: Cornöva) is a comune (municipality) in the Province of Lecco in the Italian region Lombardy, located about 60 kilometres (37 mi) northeast of Milan and about 15 kilometres (9 mi) north of Lecco.

Cortenova borders the following municipalities:

- Crandola Valsassina
- Esino Lario
- Primaluna
- Taceno
