= Perledo =

Perledo Perled (Lombard)
- Comune
- Comune di Perledo
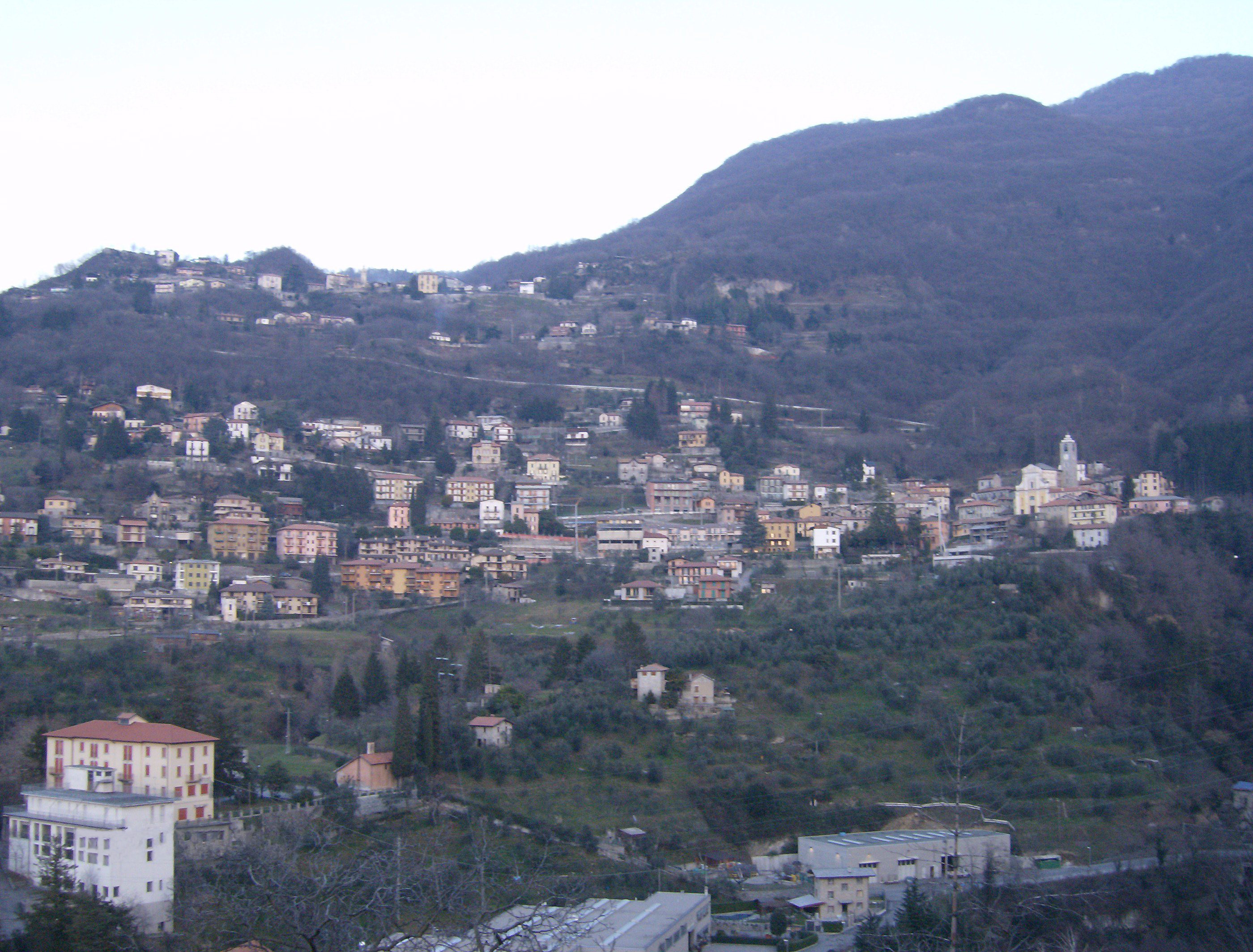
- Perledo

- Location within Italy Location within Lombardy
- Coordinates: 46°1′N 9°18′E
- Country: Italy
- Region: Lombardy
- Province: Province of Lecco (LC)

Area
  - Total: 12.53 km^{2} (4.84 sq mi)
- Elevation: 199–1,350 m (653–4,429 ft)

Population (Dec. 2010)
  - Total: 945
  - Density: 75.4/km^{2} (195/sq mi)
- Demonym: perledesi
- Time zone: UTC+1 (CET)
  - Summer (DST): UTC+2 (CEST)
- Postal code: 23828
- Dialing code: 0341
- Patron saint: Saint Martin
- Saint day: September 11
- Website: Official website

Perledo (Comasco, Lecchese: Perled [perˈleːt]) is a comune (municipality) in the Province of Lecco in the Italian region Lombardy, located about 60 kilometres (37 mi) north of Milan and about 20 kilometres (12 mi) northwest of Lecco. As of 31 December 2004, it had a population of 900 and an area of 12.5 square kilometres (4.8 mi^{2}).

Perledo borders the following municipalities: Bellano, Esino Lario, Menaggio, Parlasco, San Siro, Varenna.

Perledo includes the following "frazione" or hamlets: Tondello, Olivedo, Vezio, Regolo, Bologna, Gisazio, Regoledo, Cestaglia, Gittana, Riva di Gittana, Portone, Panighetto.

Pereldo lies on the east shore of Lake Como, across the lake from the municipality of Menaggio.

== Churches ==
- Church of San Martino (Saint Martin) is the main church of Perledo. The building is impressive, set on the hillside overlooking the lake with tall bell tower and a stone terrace in front. It has a commanding view of Lake Como.

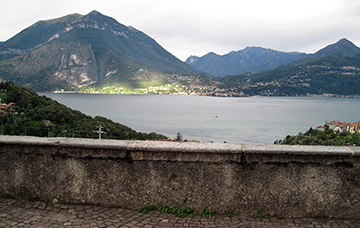
