= Montevecchia =

Montevecchia Muntavégia (Lombard)
- Comune
- Comune di Montevecchia
- Coat of arms

- Location of Montevecchia in Italy Montevecchia (Lombardy)
- Coordinates: 45°42′N 9°23′E
- Country: Italy
- Region: Lombardy
- Province: Province of Lecco (LC)

Area
  - Total: 5.9 km^{2} (2.3 sq mi)

Population (Dec. 2004)
  - Total: 2,477
  - Density: 420/km^{2} (1,100/sq mi)
- Time zone: UTC+1 (CET)
  - Summer (DST): UTC+2 (CEST)
- Postal code: 23874
- Dialing code: 039

Montevecchia (Italian: [ˌmonteˈvɛkkja]; Brianzöö: Muntavégia) is a comune (municipality) in the Province of Lecco in the Italian region of Lombardy, located about 30 kilometres (19 mi) northeast of Milan and about 15 kilometres (9 mi) south of Lecco. As of 31 December 2004, it had a population of 2,477 and an area of 5.9 square kilometres (2.3 mi^{2}).

Montevecchia borders the following municipalities: Cernusco Lombardone, Merate, Missaglia, Olgiate Molgora, Osnago, Perego and Rovagnate.

== Demographic Evolution ==
Historical population

Year	Pop.	±%
1861	884	—
1871	907	+2.6%
1881	945	+4.2%
1901	1,177	+24.6%
1911	1,393	+18.4%

Year	Pop.	±%
1921	1,487	+6.7%
1931	1,393	−6.3%
1936	1,406	+0.9%
1951	1,520	+8.1%
1961	1,414	−7.0%

Year	Pop.	±%
1971	1,402	−0.8%
1981	1,851	+32.0%
1991	2,234	+20.7%
2001	2,468	+10.5%

Source: Data from ISTAT
