= Missaglia =

Missaglia Massaja (Lombard)
- Comune
- Comune di Missaglia
- Coat of arms

- Location within Italy Location within Lombardy
- Coordinates: 45°42′N 9°20′E
- Country: Italy
- Region: Lombardy
- Province: Province of Lecco (LC)
- Frazioni: Contra, Lomaniga, Maresso, Missagliola

Government
  - Mayor: Rosagnese Casiraghi elected 2007-05-28

Area
  - Total: 11 km^{2} (4.2 sq mi)
- Elevation: 326 m (1,070 ft)

Population (31 December 2004)
  - Total: 7,805
  - Density: 710/km^{2} (1,800/sq mi)
- Demonym: Missagliesi
- Time zone: UTC+1 (CET)
  - Summer (DST): UTC+2 (CEST)
- Postal code: 23873
- Dialing code: 039
- Patron saint: San Vittore
- Saint day: 8 May
- Website: Official website

Missaglia (Brianzöö: Massaja) is a comune (municipality) in the Province of Lecco in the Italian Lombardy region, located at the centre of the area known as the Meratese. As of 31 December 2004, it had a population of 7,805. The comune, which covers an area of 11 square kilometres (4.2 mi^{2}), contains the frazioni (subdivisions, often villages or hamlets) of Contra, Lomaniga, Maresso and Missagliola

Missaglia borders the following comuni:

- Casatenovo
- Lomagna
- Montevecchia
- Monticello Brianza
- Osnago
- Perego
- Sirtori
- Viganò

Missaglia is twinned with La Roche-Posay in France.

Among the sites are the town library and the church of San Vittore.

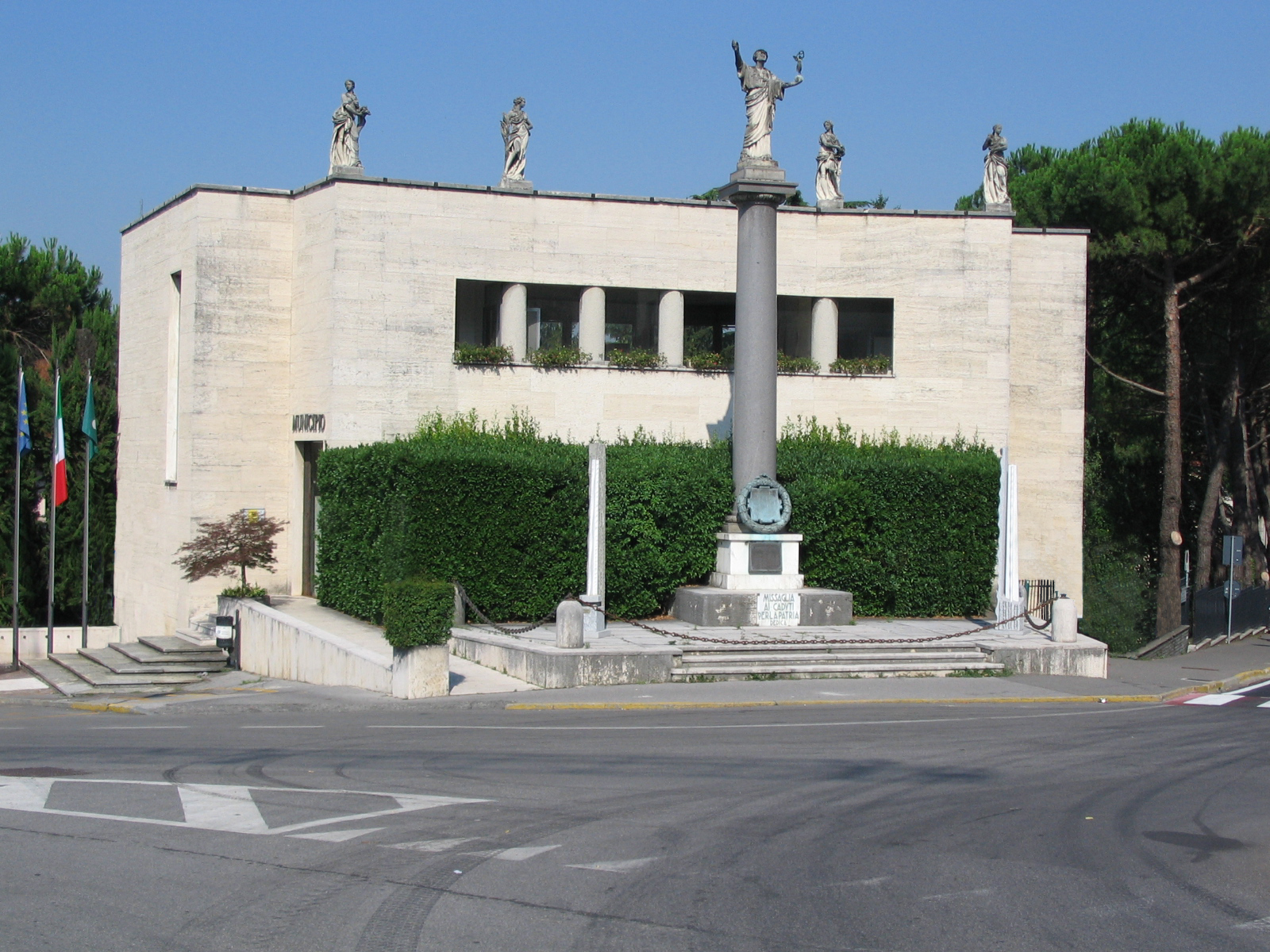
The former town hall, now a library

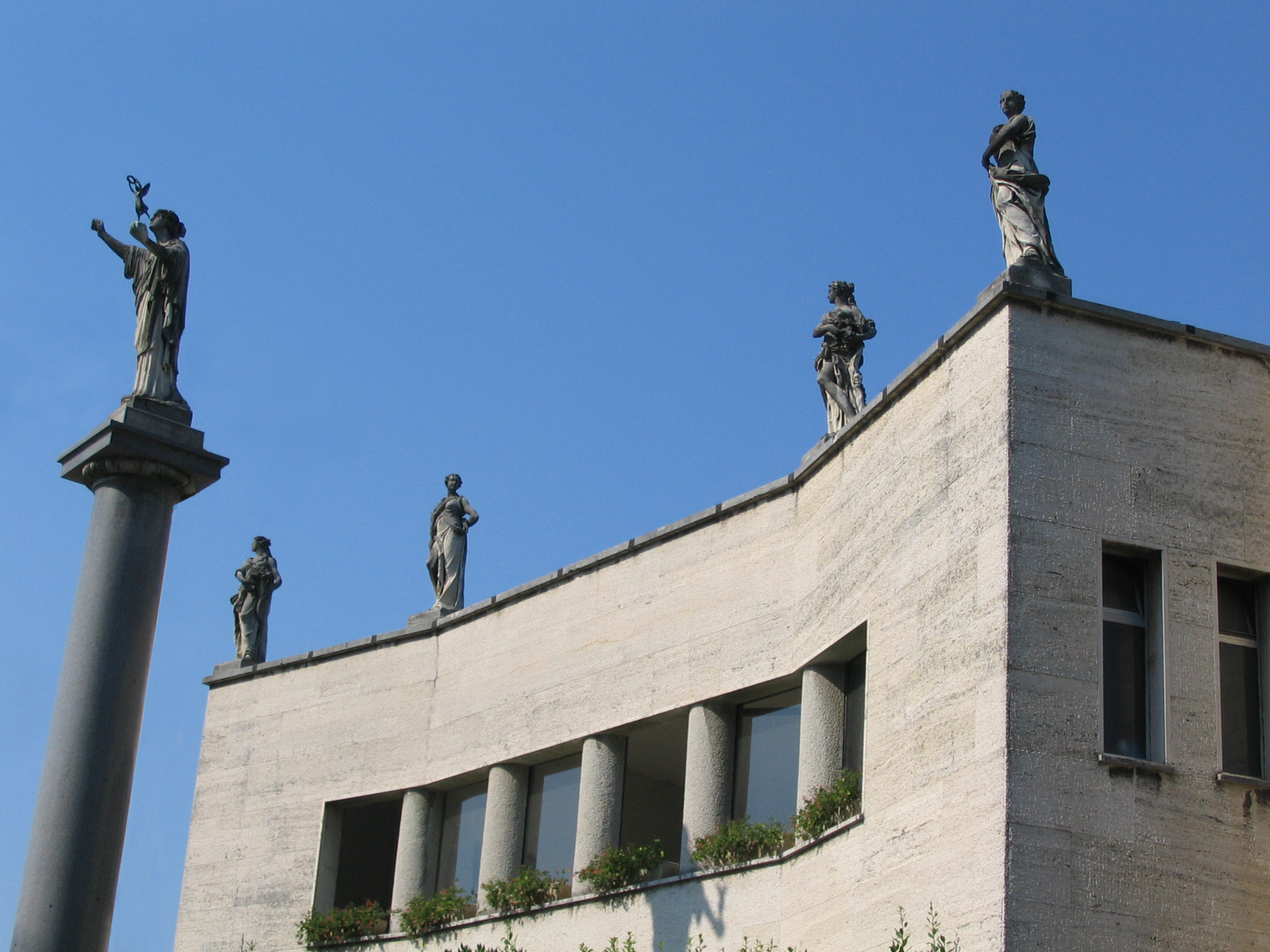
The former town hall, detail
