= Calco =

Calco Calch (Lombard)
- Comune
- Comune di Calco
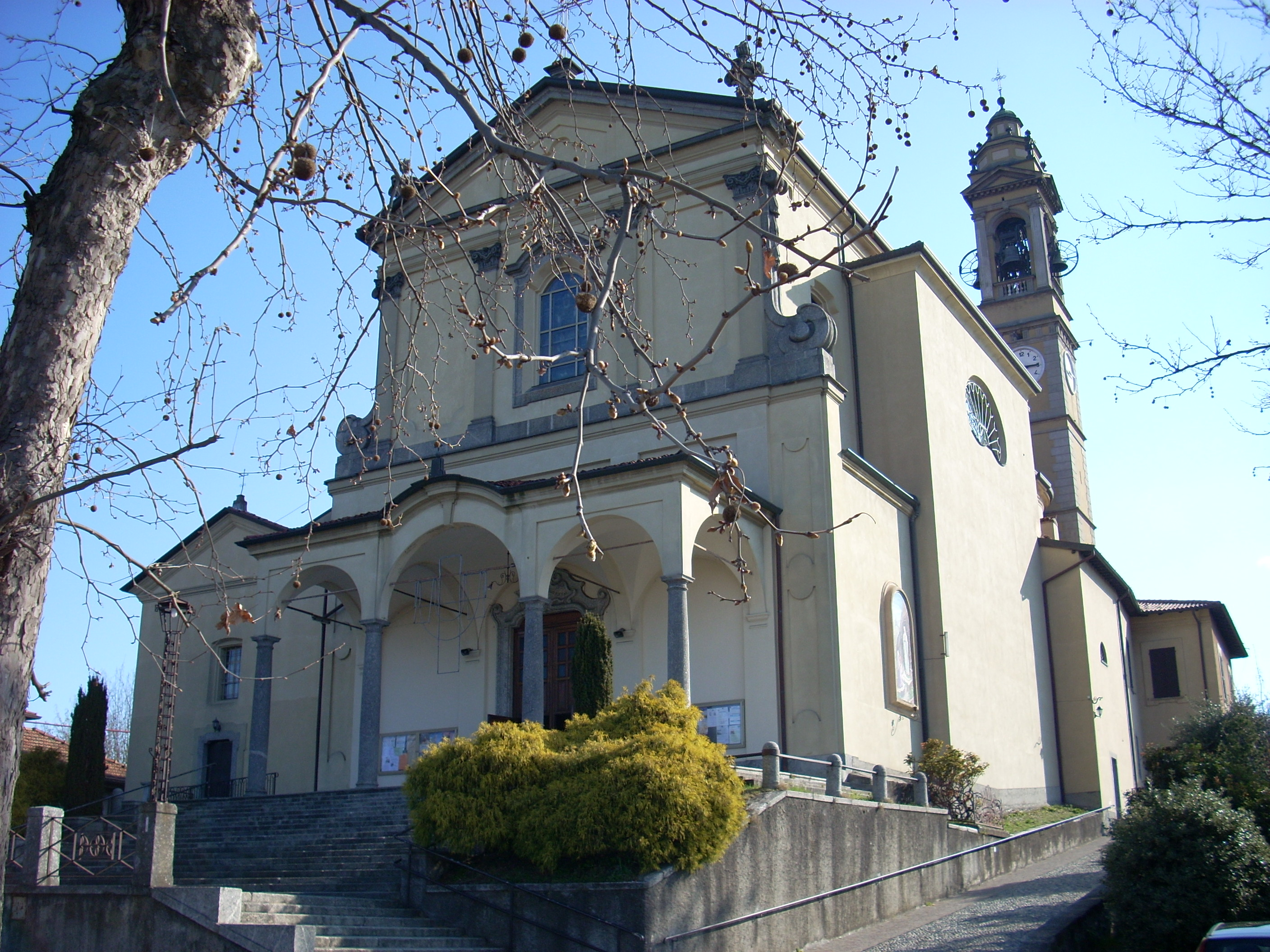
- San Vigilio Church

- Coat of arms

- Location within Italy Location within Lombardy
- Coordinates: 45°43′N 9°25′E
- Country: Italy
- Region: Lombardy
- Province: Province of Lecco (LC)

Area
  - Total: 4.6 km^{2} (1.8 sq mi)

Population (Dec. 2004)
  - Total: 4,284
  - Density: 930/km^{2} (2,400/sq mi)
- Time zone: UTC+1 (CET)
  - Summer (DST): UTC+2 (CEST)
- Postal code: 22050
- Dialing code: 039
- Website: Official website

Calco (Brianzöö: Calch) is a comune (municipality) in the Province of Lecco in the Italian region Lombardy, located about 35 kilometres (22 mi) northeast of Milan and about 15 kilometres (9 mi) south of Lecco. As of 31 December 2004, it had a population of 4,284 and an area of 4.6 square kilometres (1.8 mi^{2}).

Calco borders the following municipalities: Brivio, Imbersago, Merate, Olgiate Molgora, Pontida, Villa d'Adda. It is served by Olgiate-Calco-Brivio railway station.

== Demographic evolution ==
Historical population

Year	Pop.	±%
1861	1,394	—
1871	1,574	+12.9%
1881	1,637	+4.0%
1901	1,786	+9.1%
1911	1,789	+0.2%

Year	Pop.	±%
1921	1,764	−1.4%
1931	1,973	+11.8%
1936	2,042	+3.5%
1951	2,273	+11.3%
1961	2,421	+6.5%

Year	Pop.	±%
1971	2,671	+10.3%
1981	2,902	+8.6%
1991	3,660	+26.1%
2001	4,039	+10.4%

Source: Data from ISTAT
