= Olgiate Molgora =

Olgiate Molgora Ulgiàa (Brianzöö dialect)
- Comune
- Comune di Olgiate Molgora
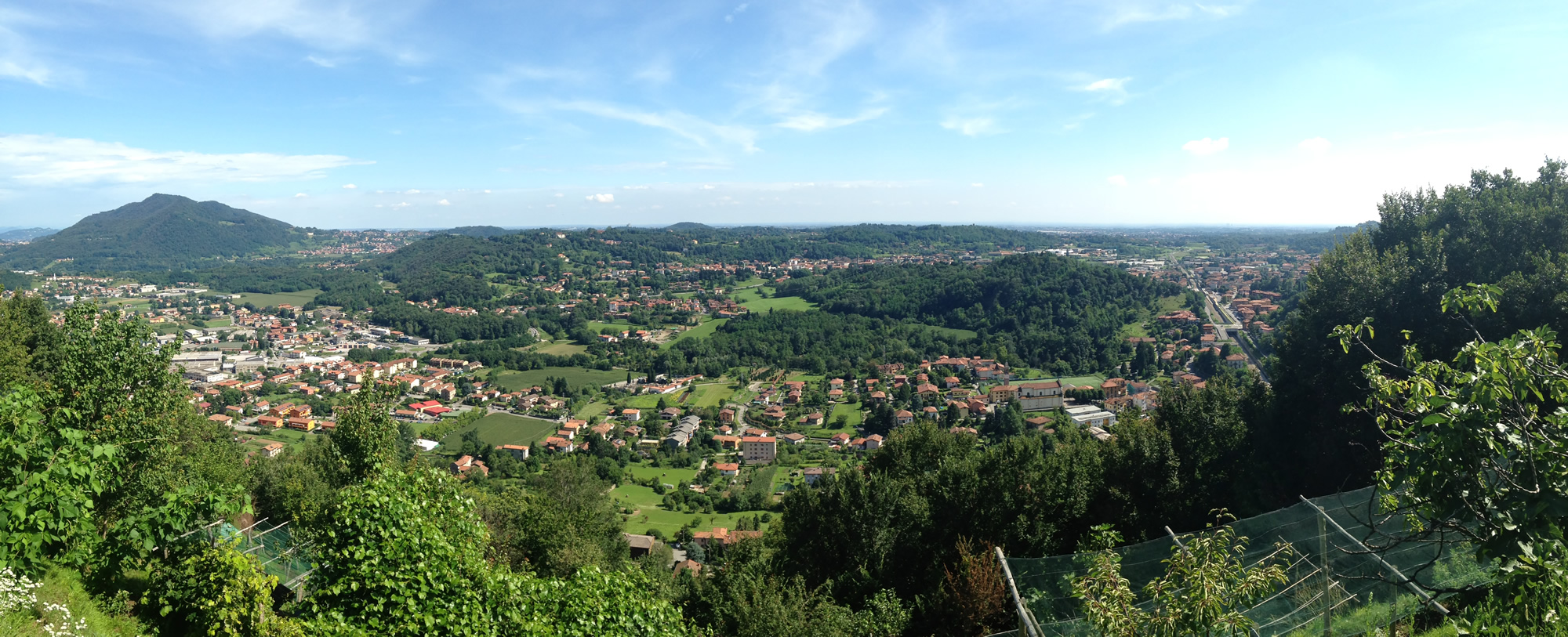
- View from Monte di Brianza

- Coat of arms

- Location within Italy Location within Lombardy
- Coordinates: 45°44′N 9°24′E
- Country: Italy
- Region: Lombardy
- Province: Province of Lecco (LC)
- Frazioni: Beolco, Borlengo, Buttero, Canova, Monastirolo, Mondonico, Monticello, Olcellera, Olgiate Vecchio, Pianezzo, Pilata, Porchera, Regondino, San Zeno, Vallicelli, Valmara

Government
  - Mayor: Giovanni Battista Bernocco (Civic List "Olgiate Rinasce")

Area
  - Total: 7.2 km^{2} (2.8 sq mi)
- Elevation: 287 m (942 ft)

Population (January 2025)
  - Total: 6,324
  - Density: 880/km^{2} (2,300/sq mi)
- Demonym: Olgiatesi
- Time zone: UTC+1 (CET)
  - Summer (DST): UTC+2 (CEST)
- Postal code: 23887
- Dialing code: 039
- Patron saint: Saint Zeno
- Saint day: April 12
- Website: Official website

Olgiate Molgora (Brianzöö: Ulgiàa) is a comune in the Province of Lecco in the Lombardy region of Italy, located 35 km (22 mi) northeast of Milan at 287 meters elevation. As of 2025, it had 6,324 inhabitants across its 7.2 km² territory.

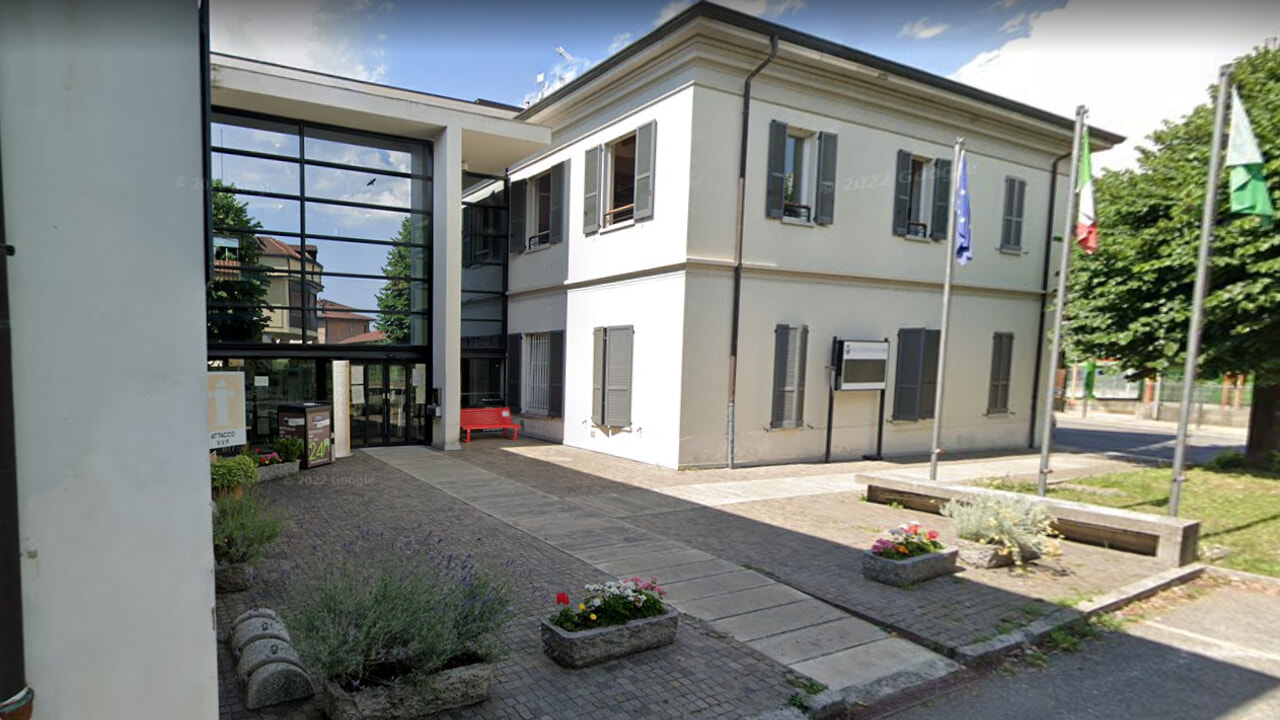
Town hall

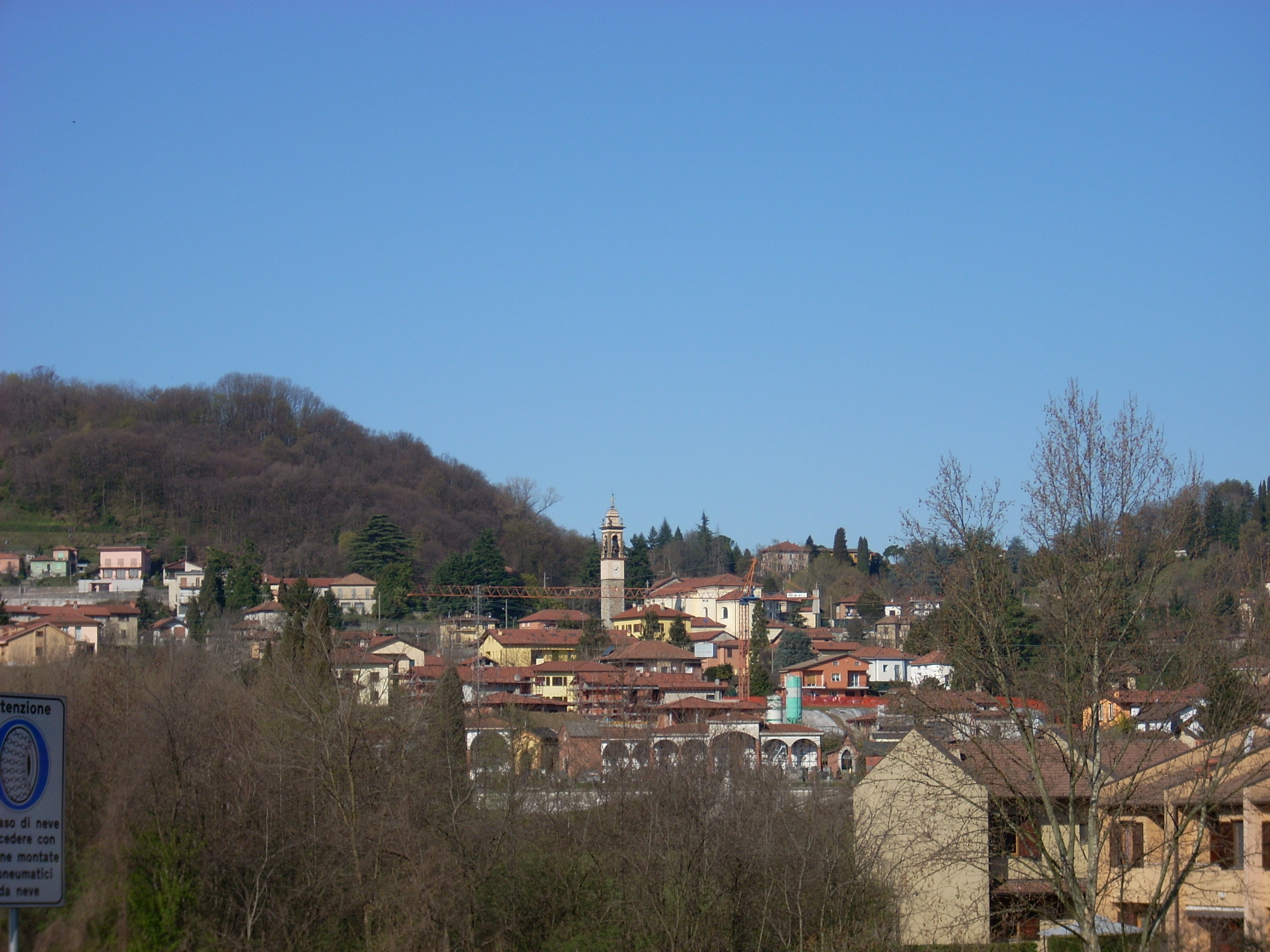
San Zeno Frazione

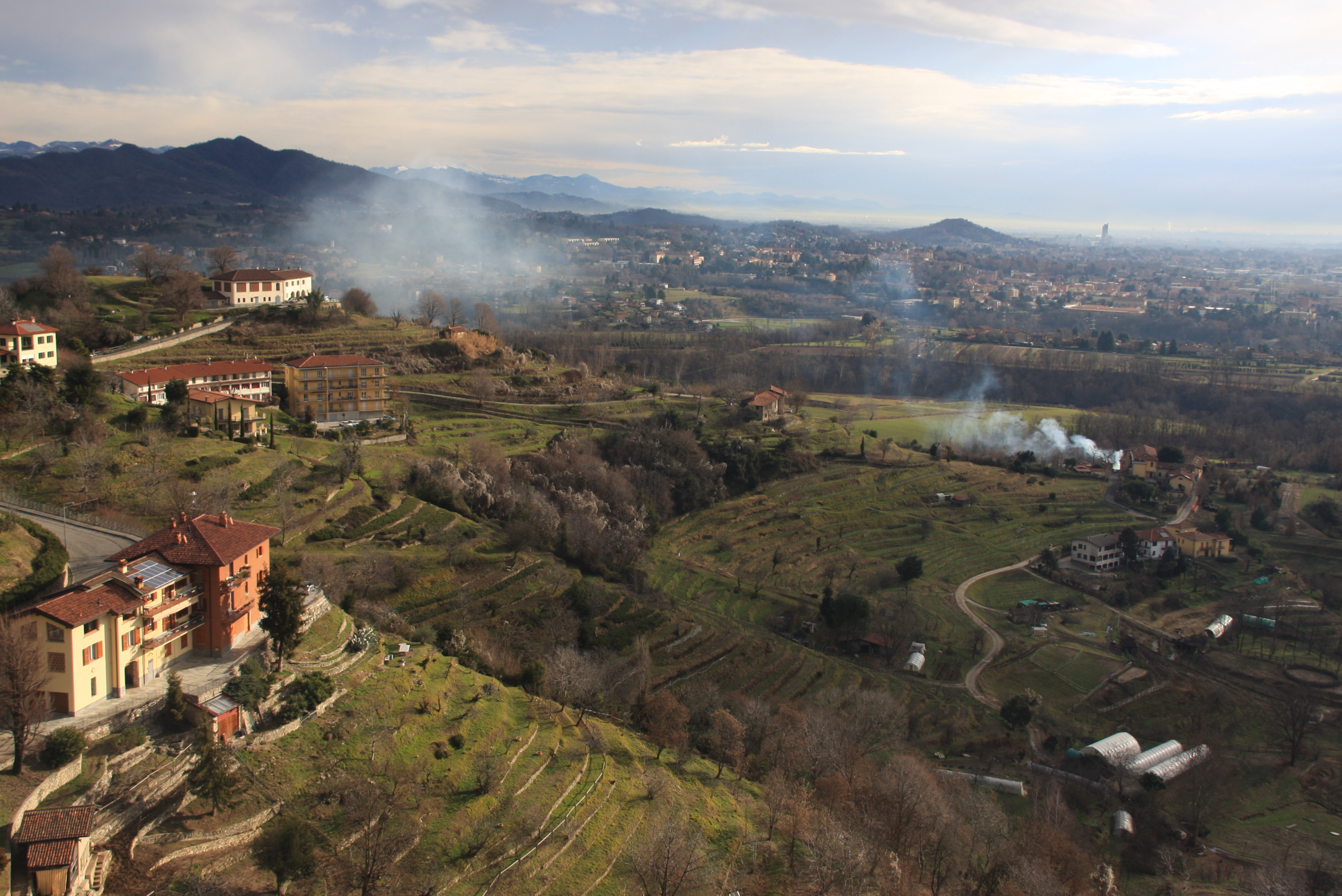
Municipal territory panorama

The municipality occupies a central position with respect to Milan, Lecco, Como, Bergamo and Monza which places it in an area well connected to the main urban, tourist and production centres. The presence of the Olgiate railway station, served by the S8 line of the Milan suburban railway service, with frequent connections that allow you to easily reach Milan (30 minutes), Lake Como (20 minutes), as well as the airports of Milan-Malpensa, Milan-Bergamo and Milan-Linate.

== Geography ==
=== Physical setting ===
Situated in the Brianza area near Merate, the municipality lies within the Milan metropolitan area. Despite high population density (~1000/km²), it maintains a balance between urban development and natural landscapes, featuring typical pre-Alpine hills with woods, farmland, and residential areas.

It borders the municipalities of Airuno, Brivio, Calco, Colle Brianza, La Valletta Brianza, Merate, Montevecchia, Santa Maria Hoè.

=== Climate ===
The climate is humid subtropical (Köppen Cfa) with hot summers and annual rainfall peaking in spring (March-May) and autumn (October-November).

== Etymology ==
The name "Olgiate" derives from Celtic olca (plowed field), while "Molgora" refers to the local river. The full name was adopted in 1863 to distinguish it from other Italian towns named Olgiate.

== History ==
=== Ancient to medieval ===
Evidence of Roman and Lombard settlements exists, particularly in Beolco where a Roman altar and 7th-century Lombard tombs were found. Queen Theodelinda initiated land reclamation projects in the 6th century to control Adda River floods.

=== Modern era ===
Key historical developments:

- 1491: Incorporated into the "Fief of the Four Pievi" under Bartolomeo Calco
- 1646: Gained independence from feudal rule
- 1863: Officially renamed Olgiate Molgora
- 1927-1953: Temporarily merged with Calco as Olgiate Calco

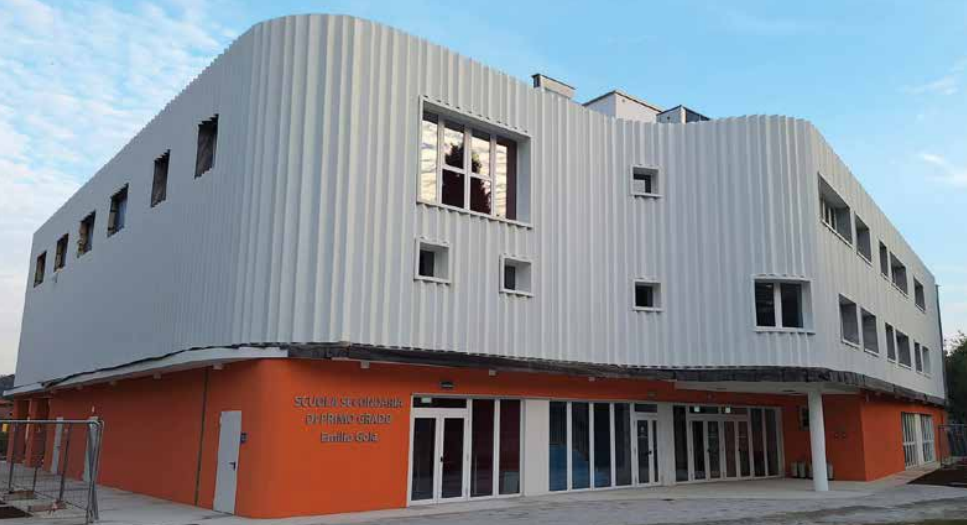
Emilio Gola Middle School

=== Railway and modern urban development ===
The railway played an important role in the modern development of Olgiate Molgora, both as a connection with Milan and Lecco and as an element shaping local roads and urban space. In 1934, when the area was part of the municipality of Olgiate Calco, local administrators and representatives met at the municipal hall to request the doubling of the Monza–Calolziocorte railway, the completion of electrification between Monza and Milan, reduced fares, and the stopping of all trains at Olgiate-Calco station. At the time, the station's catchment area was estimated at 24,700 inhabitants.

The railway issue was also linked to road connections. In the 1930s, the completion of the Lipomo–Brivio road was delayed near the railway overpass between Olgiate Molgora and Calco, while the level crossing near the station, located close to the freight shunting area, could remain closed for long periods. These difficulties were also perceived as an obstacle to the physical connection between the former municipalities merged into Olgiate Calco.

During the approval process for the doubling of the Carnate–Airuno section, the municipality of Olgiate Molgora supported an alternative solution consisting of putting the railway underground near the station. On 19 November 2001 the municipal council requested the removal of the station area from the Italferr project in order to evaluate this option. The proposal was not accepted, and the project was approved by majority vote at the services conference of 22 November 2001, with the formal dissent of Olgiate Molgora.

A subsequent agreement between the municipalities of Olgiate Molgora and Calco, the Province of Lecco and Rete Ferroviaria Italiana provided for mitigation works, urban redevelopment and improvements to local roads. The works, carried out mainly between 2004 and 2008, affected the station area, Olcellera, Valmara and several local road and pedestrian connections.

== Main sights ==
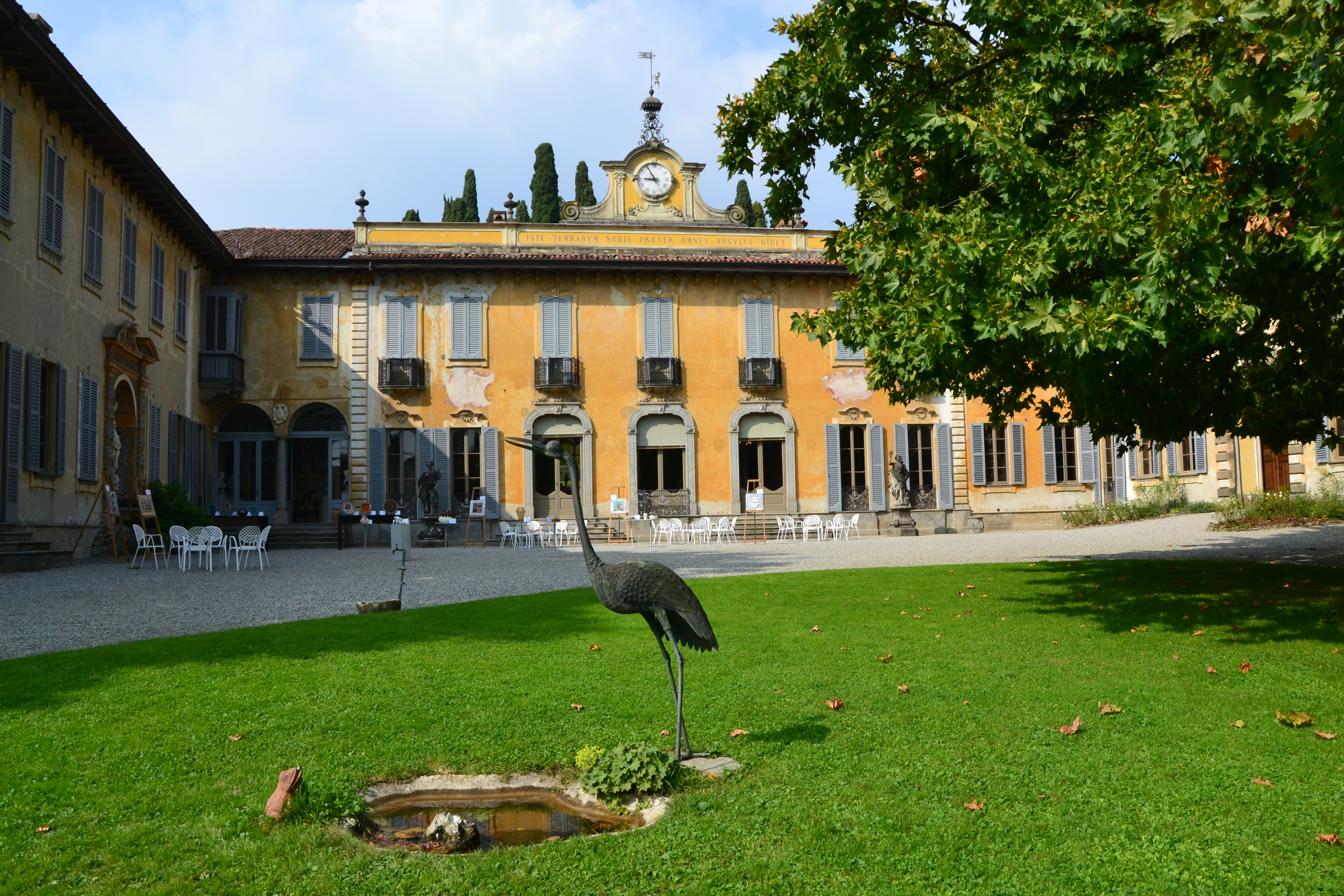
Villa Sommi Picenardi with its English landscape garden

=== Religious architecture ===
- San Zeno Parish Church (18th century) - Main church with Romanesque bell tower
- Maria Madre della Chiesa (1978) - Modern parish complex
- San Pietro Church (11th-12th c.) in Beolco - Contains Romanesque sculptures
- Santa Maria Addolorata Sanctuary (1587) in Porchera

=== Civil architecture ===
- Porchera Tower (13th c. modified in 15th c.)
- Villa Sommi Picenardi (17th c.) - Neoclassical villa with English garden
- Villa Gola (16th-19th c.) - Former residence of painter Emilio Gola
- Town Hall (1922-24) - Notable Fascist-era architecture

== Culture ==
The municipality of Olgiate Molgora contains the frazioni (subdivisions, mainly villages and hamlets) Olgiate Vecchio, Buttero, Mondonico, Porchera, San Zeno, Beolco, Monticello, Pianezzo, Monastirolo, Canova, Regondino, and Olcellera.

=== Local dialect ===
The Brianzöö dialect of Lombard remains in use alongside Italian.

=== Annual events ===
- April: Saint Zeno Festival
- June: "Garden of Hesperides" cultural event
- September: Last Summer Moon Theater Festival
- November: Library Open Day

== Infrastructure ==
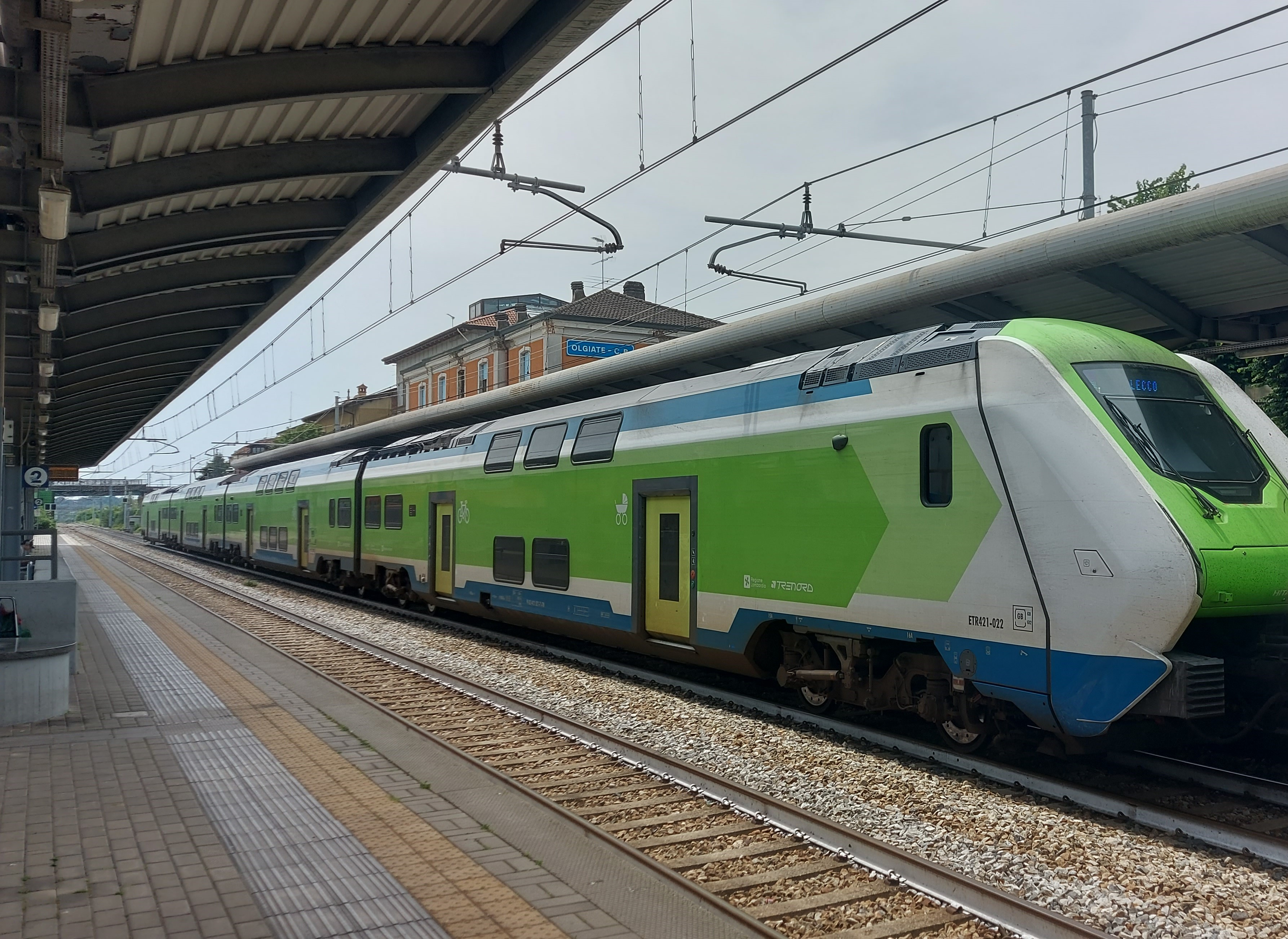
A Line S8 train at Olgiate-Calco-Brivio railway station

=== Rail ===
Olgiate Molgora is served by Olgiate-Calco-Brivio railway station, located on the Lecco–Milan railway. The station is served by Line S8 of the Milan suburban railway service, operated by Trenord, and also serves the neighbouring municipalities of Calco and Brivio.

The station historically had a wider catchment area than the municipality itself. In 1934, its catchment area was estimated at 24,700 inhabitants, served also by bus and public car services.

Between 2004 and 2008 the municipality was affected by the works for the doubling of the Carnate–Airuno railway section. These works included the Olcellera tunnel, the reorganisation of the station area, the lowering of the tracks near the station, new underpasses and pedestrian and cycle routes, and changes to local roads.

=== Roads and buses ===
The municipality is crossed by the Strada statale 342 Briantea, which connects the Como and Bergamo areas. It is also located close to the Strada statale 36 del Lago di Como e dello Spluga and to the eastern road network of the Milan metropolitan area.

Local and interurban bus services connect Olgiate Molgora with nearby municipalities and with the wider Merate area.

=== Healthcare ===
Nearest hospital: San Leopoldo Mandic (Merate, 4 km)

== Demographic evolution ==
Historical population

Year	Pop.	±%
1861	1,955	—
1871	2,117	+8.3%
1881	2,122	+0.2%
1901	2,479	+16.8%
1911	2,812	+13.4%
1921	2,922	+3.9%

Year	Pop.	±%
1931	2,945	+0.8%
1936	3,012	+2.3%
1951	3,691	+22.5%
1961	4,309	+16.7%
1971	4,302	−0.2%
1981	4,727	+9.9%

Year	Pop.	±%
1991	5,430	+14.9%
2001	5,755	+6.0%
2011	6,190	+7.6%
2021	6,346	+2.5%

Source: Data from ISTAT

=== Foreign residents ===
As of 2020, immigrants constitute 11.3% of population:

- Romania (153)
- Morocco (107)
- Albania (92)
- India (59)
- Senegal (50)

== Administration ==
=== Twin towns ===
- Stocksmoor, United Kingdom (since 1998)
- Oisterwijk, Netherlands (since 2024)
