= Cernusco =

Cernusco may refer to 2 Italian municipalities in Lombardy:

- Cernusco Lombardone, in the province of Lecco
- Cernusco sul Naviglio, in the province of Milan
