= Viganò =

- Comune
- Comune di Viganò
- Coat of arms

- Location within Italy Location within Lombardy
- Coordinates: 45°43′N 9°19′E
- Country: Italy
- Region: Lombardy
- Province: Province of Lecco (LC)

Area
  - Total: 1.6 km^{2} (0.62 sq mi)

Population (Dec. 2004)
  - Total: 1,804
  - Density: 1,100/km^{2} (2,900/sq mi)
- Time zone: UTC+1 (CET)
  - Summer (DST): UTC+2 (CEST)
- Postal code: 22060
- Dialing code: 039
- Website: Official website

Viganò is a comune (municipality) in the Province of Lecco in the Italian region Lombardy, located about 30 kilometres (19 mi) northeast of Milan and about 15 kilometres (9 mi) southwest of Lecco. As of 31 December 2004, it had a population of 1,804 and an area of 1.6 square kilometres (0.62 mi^{2}).

Viganò borders the following municipalities: Barzanò, Missaglia, Monticello Brianza, Sirtori.

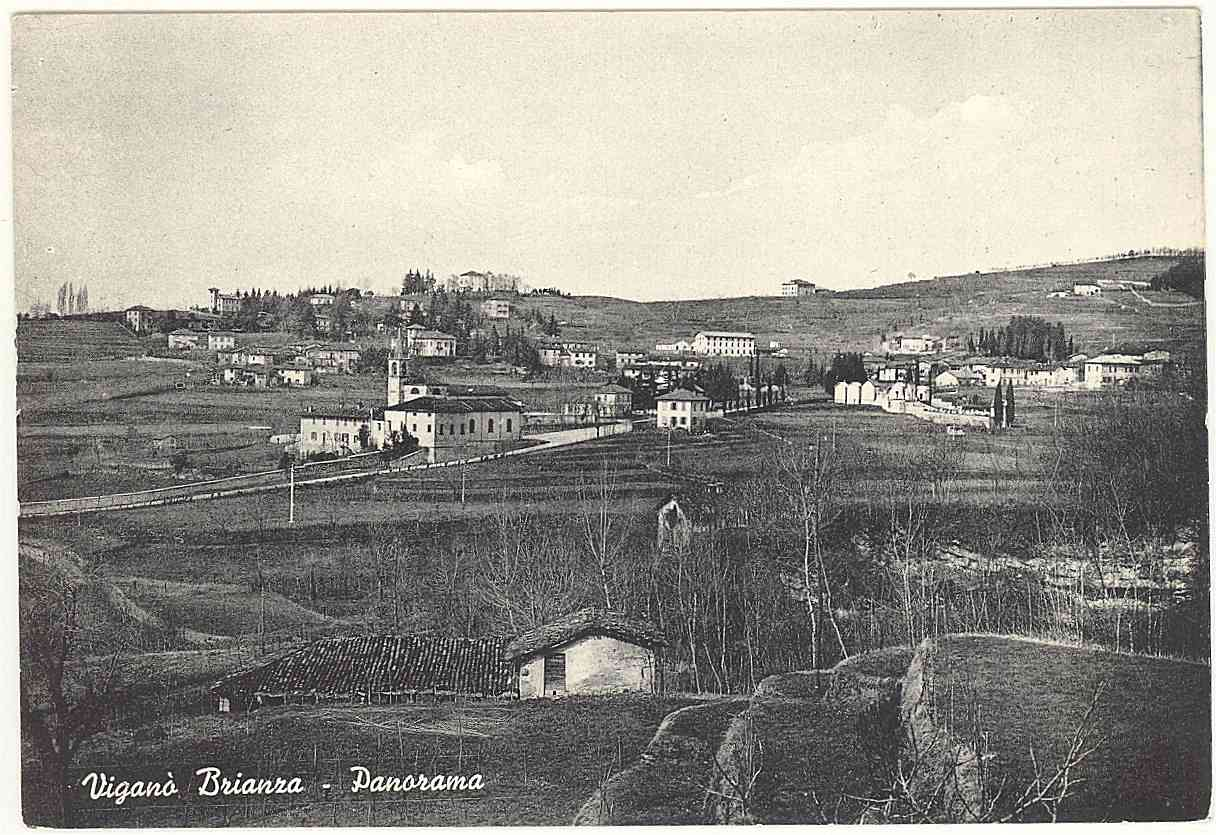
Postcard, 1959

== Demographic evolution ==
Historical population

Year	Pop.	±%
1861	857	—
1871	844	−1.5%
1881	952	+12.8%
1901	977	+2.6%
1911	1,049	+7.4%

Year	Pop.	±%
1921	921	−12.2%
1931	914	−0.8%
1936	870	−4.8%
1951	1,027	+18.0%
1961	1,060	+3.2%

Year	Pop.	±%
1971	1,122	+5.8%
1981	1,263	+12.6%
1991	1,572	+24.5%
2001	1,767	+12.4%

Source: Data from ISTAT
