= Olgiate =

Olgiate may refer to:

- Olgiate Comasco, municipality in the Province of Como in the Italian region Lombardy, Italy
- Olgiate Molgora, municipality in the Province of Lecco in the Italian region Lombardy, Italy
- Olgiate Olona, town and comune in the province of Varese, in the Lombardy region of northern Italy.
