= Cernusco Lombardone =

- Comune
- Comune di Cernusco Lombardone
- Church

- Location within Italy Location within Lombardy
- Coordinates: 45°42′N 9°24′E
- Country: Italy
- Region: Lombardy
- Province: Province of Lecco (LC)

Area
  - Total: 3.8 km^{2} (1.5 sq mi)

Population (Dec. 2007)
  - Total: 3,863
  - Density: 1,000/km^{2} (2,600/sq mi)
- Time zone: UTC+1 (CET)
  - Summer (DST): UTC+2 (CEST)
- Postal code: 23870
- Dialing code: 039
- Website: Official website

Cernusco Lombardone (Brianzöö: Cernösch) is a comune (municipality) in the Province of Lecco in the Italian region Lombardy, located about 30 kilometres (19 mi) northeast of Milan and about 15 kilometres (9 mi) south of Lecco. As of 31 December 2007, it had a population of 3,863 and an area of 3.8 square kilometres (1.5 mi^{2}).

Cernusco Lombardone borders the following municipalities: Merate, Montevecchia, Osnago. It is served by Cernusco-Merate railway station.

== Demographic evolution ==
Historical population

Year	Pop.	±%
1861	1,258	—
1871	1,324	+5.2%
1881	1,345	+1.6%
1901	1,859	+38.2%
1911	1,957	+5.3%

Year	Pop.	±%
1921	2,008	+2.6%
1931	2,078	+3.5%
1936	2,178	+4.8%
1951	2,518	+15.6%
1961	2,677	+6.3%

Year	Pop.	±%
1971	2,818	+5.3%
1981	3,214	+14.1%
1991	3,331	+3.6%
2001	3,540	+6.3%

Source: Data from ISTAT
