= Daniele Nava =

Italian politician

Undersecretary for Institutional Reforms and Local Authorities of Lombardy
- In office 29 April 2014 – 26 March 2018
- President: Roberto Maroni

President of the Province of Lecco
- In office 8 June 2009 – 3 June 2014
- Preceded by: Virginio Brivio
- Succeeded by: Flavio Polano

Personal details
- Born: 20 January 1975 (age 51) Lecco, Italy
- Party: National Alliance; The People of Freedom; New Centre-Right; Forza Italia; Lega Nord
- Occupation: Entrepreneur

Daniele Nava (born 20 January 1975) is an Italian entrepreneur and politician. He served as president of the Province of Lecco from 2009 to 2014 and later as undersecretary in the Lombardy regional government.

== Life and career ==
Nava worked in his family-owned business in Brianza before entering local politics in Lecco, where he was elected councillor in 1997 with National Alliance. He served as deputy mayor between 2001 and 2009.

In 2009, he was elected president of the Province of Lecco as the centre-right candidate, defeating the incumbent Virginio Brivio. During his office, Nava introduced measures to rationalise public expenditure and reorganise administrative structures, with the stated aim of improving efficiency, reducing costs, and enhancing coordination between the Province and local institutions. He also promoted initiatives on territorial development, transport infrastructure, and environmental planning.

In June 2014, Nava resigned after being appointed undersecretary for Institutional Reforms and Local Authorities in the Lombardy regional government led by Roberto Maroni.

In 2020, Nava was considered a possible centre-right candidate for mayor of Lecco, but ultimately announced that he would not stand for election, citing personal and professional commitments related to the management of his family business. In September 2021, Nava left Forza Italia and joined Lega Nord as part of a broader political realignment within the regional centre-right coalition.
