= Mauro Gattinoni =

Italian politician

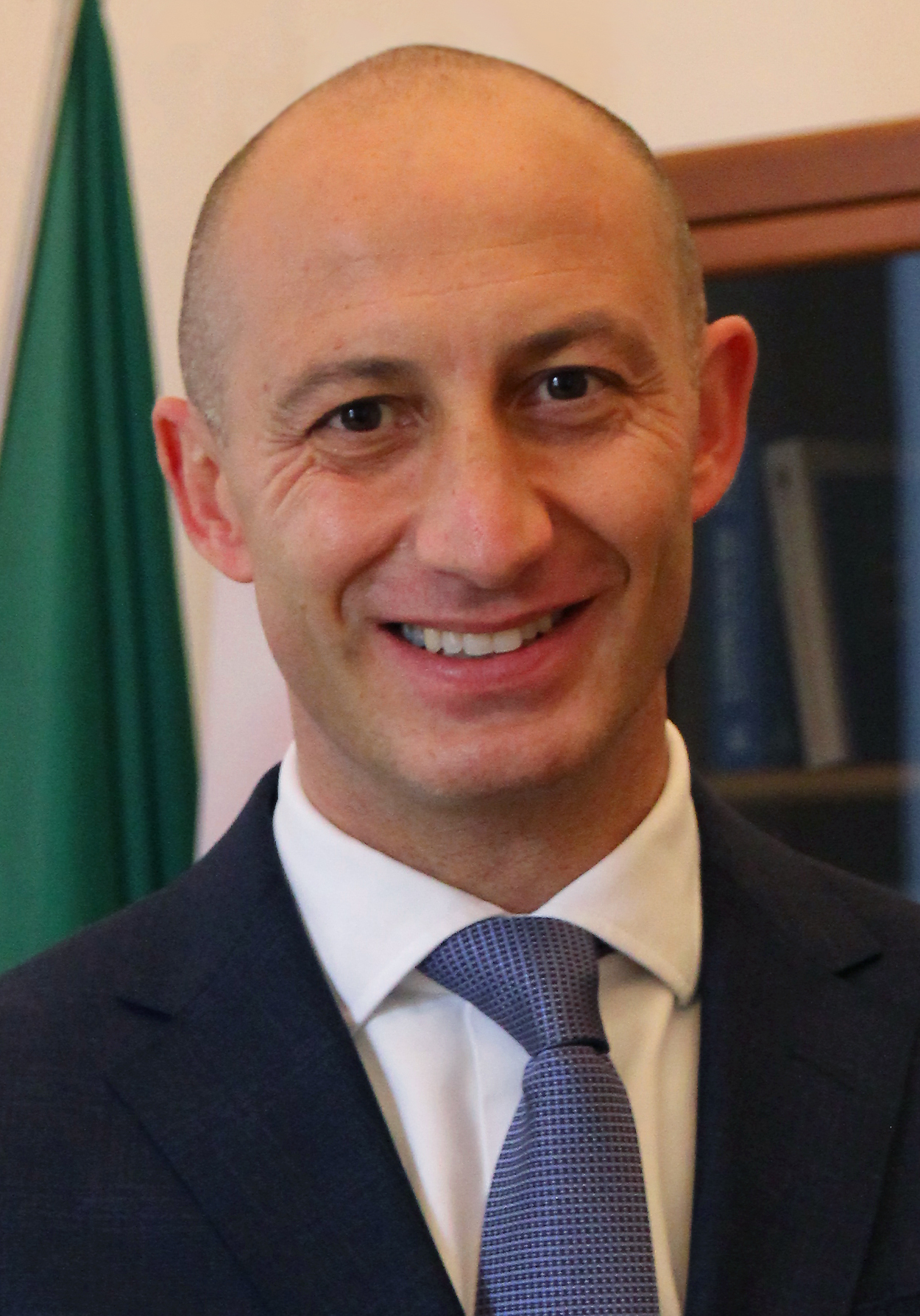
- Gattinoni in 2020

Mayor of Lecco
- In office 6 October 2020 – 9 June 2026
- Preceded by: Virginio Brivio
- Succeeded by: Filippo Boscagli

Personal details
- Born: 22 July 1977 (age 49) Lecco, Lombardy, Italy
- Party: Independent
- Education: Università Cattolica del Sacro Cuore
- Profession: Manager

Mauro Gattinoni (born 22 July 1977) is an Italian politician.

He ran for mayor of Lecco as an independent at the 2020 Italian local elections, supported by a centre-left coalition. He was elected at the second round with 50.07% and took office on 6 October 2020.

== See also ==
- 2020 Italian local elections
- List of mayors of Lecco

Political offices
Preceded by Virginio Brivio	Mayor of Lecco; 2020–2026	Succeeded by Filippo Boscagli
