= Antonella Faggi =

Italian politician

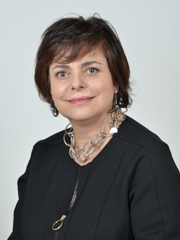

Mayor of Lecco
- In office 30 May 2006 – 28 October 2009
- Preceded by: Lorenzo Bodega
- Succeeded by: Virginio Brivio

Member of the Senate
- In office 23 March 2018 – 12 October 2022

Personal details
- Born: 20 September 1961 (age 65) Lecco, Lombardy, Italy
- Party: Lega Nord
- Education: University of Milan
- Profession: entrepreneur

Antonella Faggi (born 20 September 1961) is an Italian politician who served as mayor of Lecco (2006–2009) and Senator (2018–2022).

Political offices
Preceded by Lorenzo Bodega	Mayor of Lecco; 2006-2009	Succeeded by Virginio Brivio
