= Olgiate–Calco–Brivio railway station =

Railway station in Italy

Olgiate–Calco–Brivio
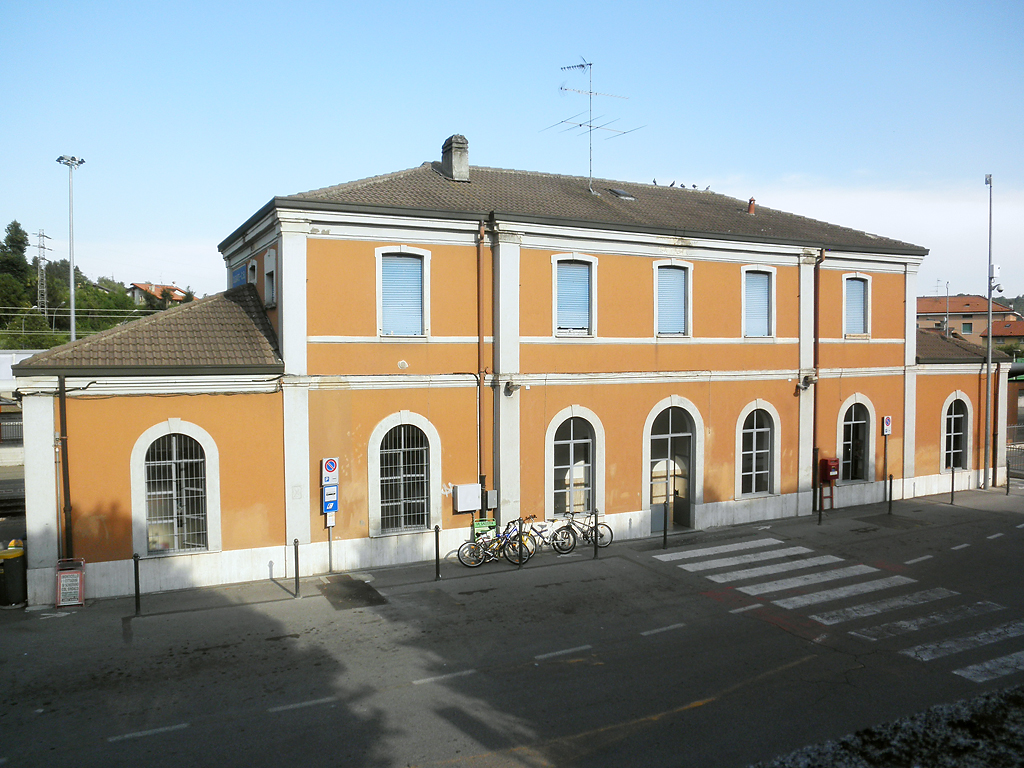

General information
- Other names: Olgiate C.B. Olgiate
- Location: Piazza IV Novembre; Olgiate Molgora, Lecco, Lombardy; Italy
- Coordinates: 45°43′45″N 09°24′13″E
- Operator: Rete Ferroviaria Italiana
- Line: Lecco–Milan
- Distance: 20.758 km (12.898 mi) from Monza
- Platforms: 2
- Tracks: 2
- Train operators: Trenord
- Bus routes: Arriva E03; D84 ASF Autolinee C46

Construction
- Structure type: At-grade

Other information
- Classification: silver
- Website: Olgiate-Calco-Brivio

History
- Opened: 27 December 1873; 152 years ago

Services
Preceding station	Trenord	Following station
Cernusco–Merate towards Milano Porta Garibaldi	Line S8 (Milan suburban railway service)	Airuno towards Lecco
Location
- Location within Lombardy Location within Northern Italy Location within Italy

Olgiate–Calco–Brivio is a railway station in Italy. Located in the Olgiate Molgora municipality on the Lecco–Milan railway, it also serves the Calco and Brivio municipalities.

== History ==
The station was opened in 1873, when the Monza–Calolziocorte section of the Lecco–Milan railway entered service. It was originally named Olgiate-Calco and received its present name, Olgiate-Calco-Brivio, in 1950.

Calls for the doubling of the railway line in the Olgiate area date back to the first half of the 20th century. On 2 May 1934, local administrators meeting at the municipal hall of Olgiate-Calco requested the start of double-tracking works between Monza and Calolziocorte, the completion of electrification between Monza and Milan, reduced fares, and the stopping of all trains at Olgiate-Calco. At that time the station's catchment area was estimated at 24,700 inhabitants.

The doubling of the Carnate–Airuno section was the subject of a long planning process. A first project was presented in 1983, but was opposed by the municipalities concerned because of its expected landscape and urban impact. In 1985 the municipal government of Olgiate raised objections to the final project, arguing that the proposed route interfered with local urban planning and required further technical study.

During the approval process for the final project, the municipality of Olgiate Molgora supported an alternative solution consisting of putting the line underground near the station. On 19 November 2001 the municipal council asked for the section near the station to be removed from the Italferr project in order to evaluate this option. The project was nevertheless approved by majority vote at the services conference of 22 November 2001, with the formal dissent of Olgiate Molgora.

Following the rejection of the undergrounding proposal, a separate agreement was reached between the municipalities of Olgiate Molgora and Calco, the Province of Lecco and Rete Ferroviaria Italiana. The agreement provided for additional mitigation, urban redevelopment and road-improvement works connected with the railway doubling.

Works on the Carnate–Airuno doubling officially began on 1 September 2004. In the Olgiate Molgora area they involved the construction of a new railway alignment, the Olcellera tunnel and a wider reorganisation of local roads. During the works the station was temporarily moved to containers located near Via Papa Giovanni XXIII. The permanent station was restored on 29 July 2008, when the temporary structures were dismantled and the doubled track was activated. On the same date the station was operationally converted into a halt.

== Station layout ==
The station has two through tracks served by two side platforms connected by an underpass. It is unstaffed and has no freight yard, the latter having been removed during the works for the doubling of the Carnate–Airuno section.

== Interchange ==
The station area is served by car parks, pedestrian routes and connections with the local road network. The works associated with the railway doubling included a reorganisation of the rail-road interchange, with bus facilities, new pedestrian and cycle routes, and parking areas serving the municipalities gravitating around the station.

== Services ==
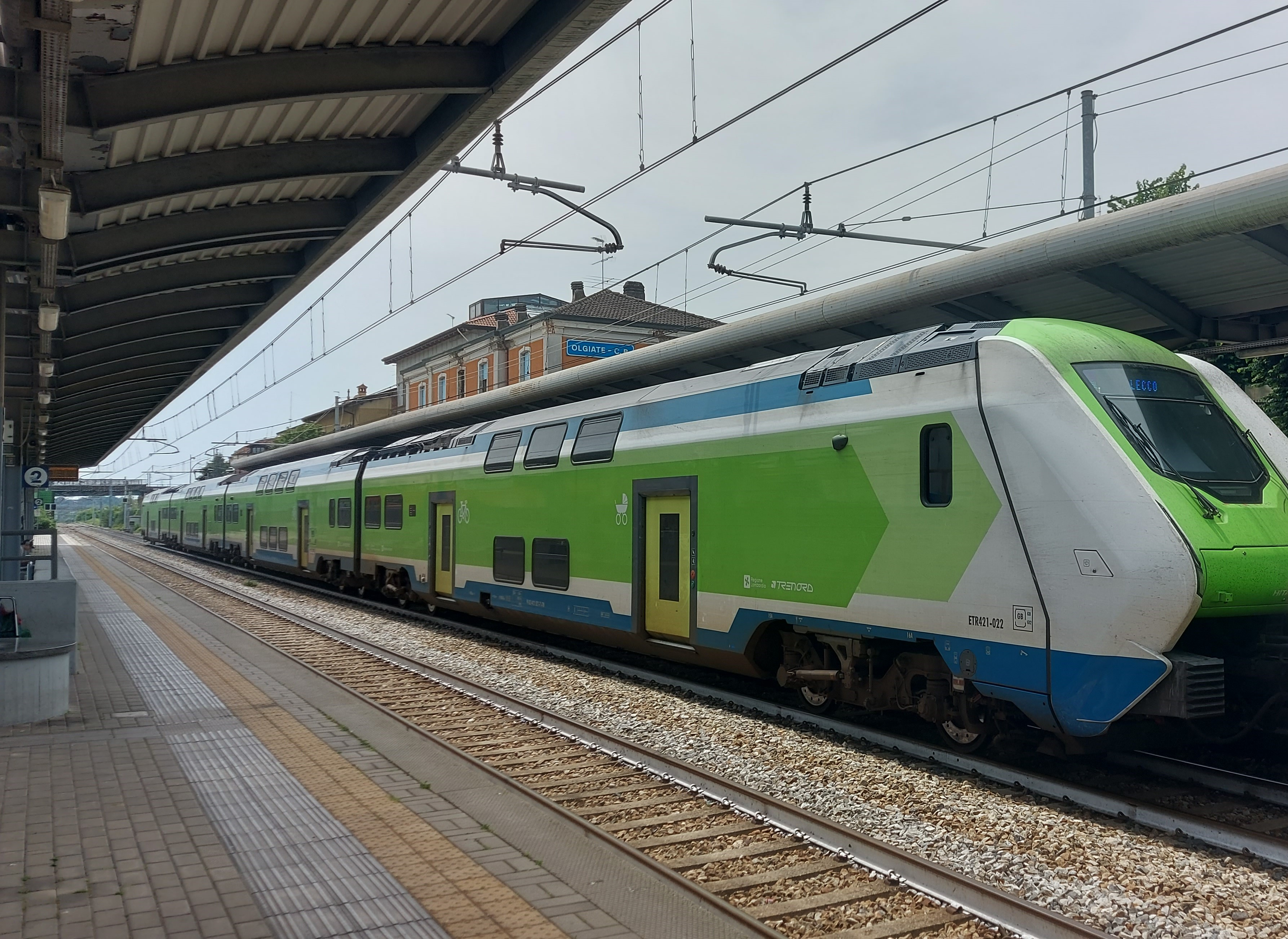
A Line S8 train at the station

Olgiate–Calco–Brivio is served by Line S8 of the Milan suburban railway service, operated by Trenord, between Lecco and Milano Porta Garibaldi.

From Monday to Saturday, S8 trains generally run every thirty minutes per direction, with an hourly service in the late evening. The frequency is reduced to one train per hour per direction on Sundays. One southbound RegioExpress service to Milano Centrale also stops at the station in the early morning.

== Ridership ==
According to station usage data published by Regione Lombardia, weekday boardings at Olgiate–Calco–Brivio increased from 1,420 in 2019 to 2,400 in 2025. The figures are based on periodic ridership surveys and do not represent continuous passenger counts.

Weekday boardings
Year	Boardings
2015	1,560
2016	1,410
2017	1,480
2018	1,550
2019	1,420
2020	380
2021	1,080
2022	1,300
2023	1,660
2024	1,830
2025	2,400

Located within the station are a bar, a newsstand, and Olgiate Molgora's Pro Loco.

== See also ==
- Milan suburban railway service
- Olgiate Molgora
- Line S8
- Transport in Milan
- Milan metropolitan area
