= Cernusco–Merate railway station =

Railway station in Italy

Cernusco–Merate
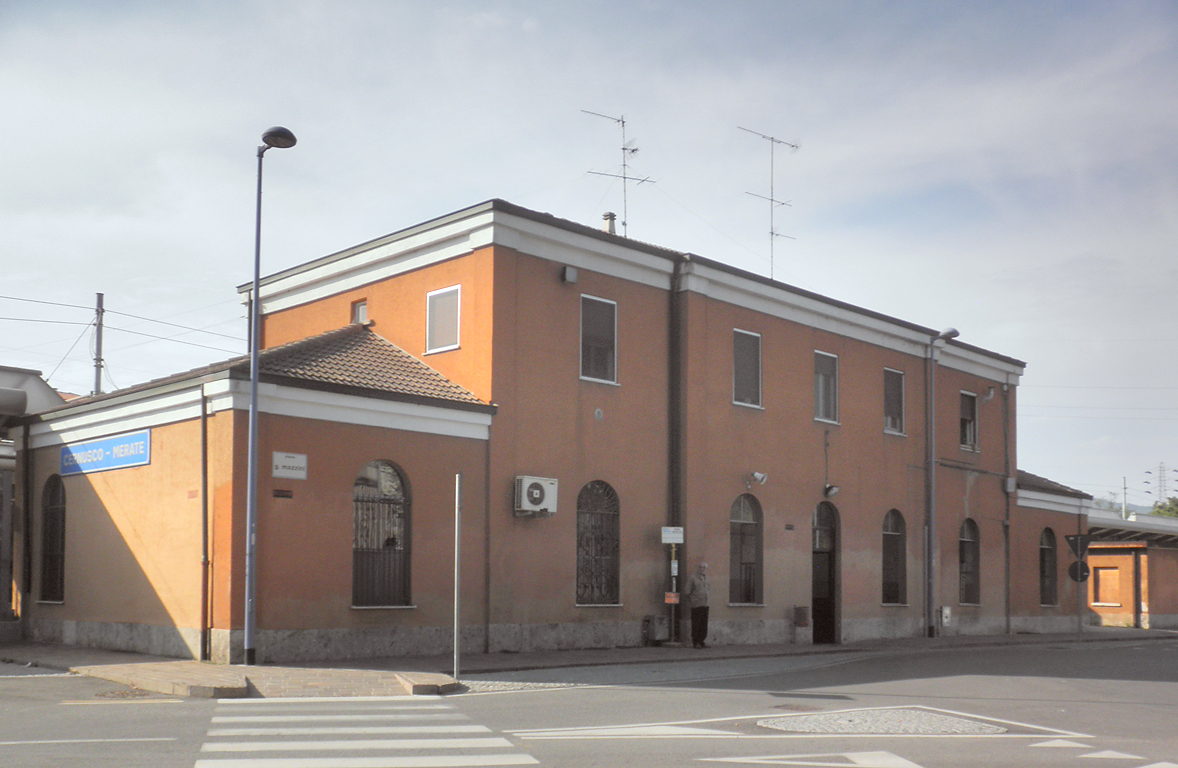

General information
- Location: Piazza Mazzini; Cernusco Lombardone, Lecco, Lombardy; Italy
- Coordinates: 45°41′42″N 09°23′49″E
- Operator: Rete Ferroviaria Italiana
- Line: Lecco–Milan
- Distance: 16.869 km (10.482 mi) from Monza
- Platforms: 2
- Tracks: 2
- Train operators: Trenord

Other information
- Classification: silver

History
- Opened: December 27, 1873; 152 years ago

Services
Preceding station	Trenord	Following station
Osnago towards Milano Porta Garibaldi	Line S8 (Milan suburban railway service)	Olgiate–Calco–Brivio towards Lecco
Location
- Location within Lombardy Location within Northern Italy Location within Italy

Cernusco–Merate railway station is a railway station in Italy. Located on the Lecco–Milan railway, it serves the towns of Cernusco Lombardone and Merate.

== Services ==
Cernusco–Merate is served by the line S8 of the Milan suburban railway service, operated by the Lombard railway company Trenord.

== See also ==
- Milan suburban railway service
