= Alessandra Hofmann =

Italian politician

President of the Province of Lecco
- Incumbent
- Assumed office 19 December 2021
- Preceded by: Claudio Usuelli

Mayor of Monticello Brianza
- Incumbent
- Assumed office 27 May 2019
- Preceded by: Luca Rigamonti

Personal details
- Born: 25 October 1976 (age 49) Giussano, Lombardy, Italy

Alessandra Hofmann (born 25 October 1976) is an Italian politician serving as president of the Province of Lecco since 2021.

== Life and career ==
Hofmann was born in Giussano in 1976 and, after obtaining a secondary school diploma, worked in administrative and organisational roles in the field of languages. In May 2019, she was elected mayor of Monticello Brianza, and re-elected in 2024.

In December 2021, she was elected president of the Province of Lecco, supported by the centre-right coalition, succeeding Claudio Usuelli. She was re-elected to the same office in January 2026, defeating Fabio Vergani in the provincial election.
