= Mario Anghileri =

Italian lawyer and politician

President of the Province of Lecco
- In office 8 May 1995 – 28 June 2004
- Preceded by: Office established
- Succeeded by: Virginio Brivio

Mayor of Valmadrera
- In office 14 June 2004 – 8 June 2009
- In office 1970–1975

Personal details
- Born: 28 April 1941 (age 85) Valmadrera, Kingdom of Italy
- Party: Italian People's Party
- Occupation: Lawyer

Mario Anghileri (born 28 April 1941) is an Italian lawyer and politician who served as the first president of the Province of Lecco from 1995 to 2004.

== Life and career ==
Born in Valmadrera, Anghileri graduated in law from the Catholic University of the Sacred Heart in Milan in 1966. He worked in hospital administration before becoming a practising lawyer specialising in administrative and labour law.

Anghileri began his political career in his hometown of Valmadrera, being elected mayor in 1970.

Following the establishment of the Province of Lecco, Anghileri was elected its first president in 1995 and was re-elected in 1999, serving until 2004. During his presidency he oversaw the organisation of the newly created provincial administration and promoted major infrastructure projects, including the completion of the Lecco–Ballabio road.

After leaving the provincial presidency, Anghileri was elected mayor of Valmadrera in 2004 and served until 2009. At the end of his term he retired from elective politics.
