= Lorenzo Bodega =

Italian politician (born 1959)

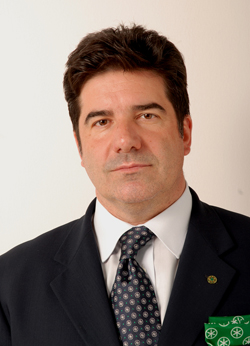

Mayor of Lecco
- In office 12 May 1997 – 8 March 2006
- Preceded by: Giuseppe Pogliani
- Succeeded by: Antonella Faggi

Member of the Chamber of Deputies
- In office 28 April 2006 – 29 April 2008

Member of the Senate
- In office 29 April 2008 – 14 March 2013

Personal details
- Born: 11 July 1959 (age 66) Lecco, Lombardy, Italy
- Party: Lega Nord
- Profession: architect

Lorenzo Bodega (born 11 July 1959) is an Italian politician who served as Mayor of Lecco (1997–2006), Deputy (2006–2008) and Senator (2008–2013).

Political offices
Preceded by Giuseppe Pogliani	Mayor of Lecco; 1997-2006	Succeeded by Antonella Faggi
