= Osnago railway station =

Railway station in Italy

Osnago
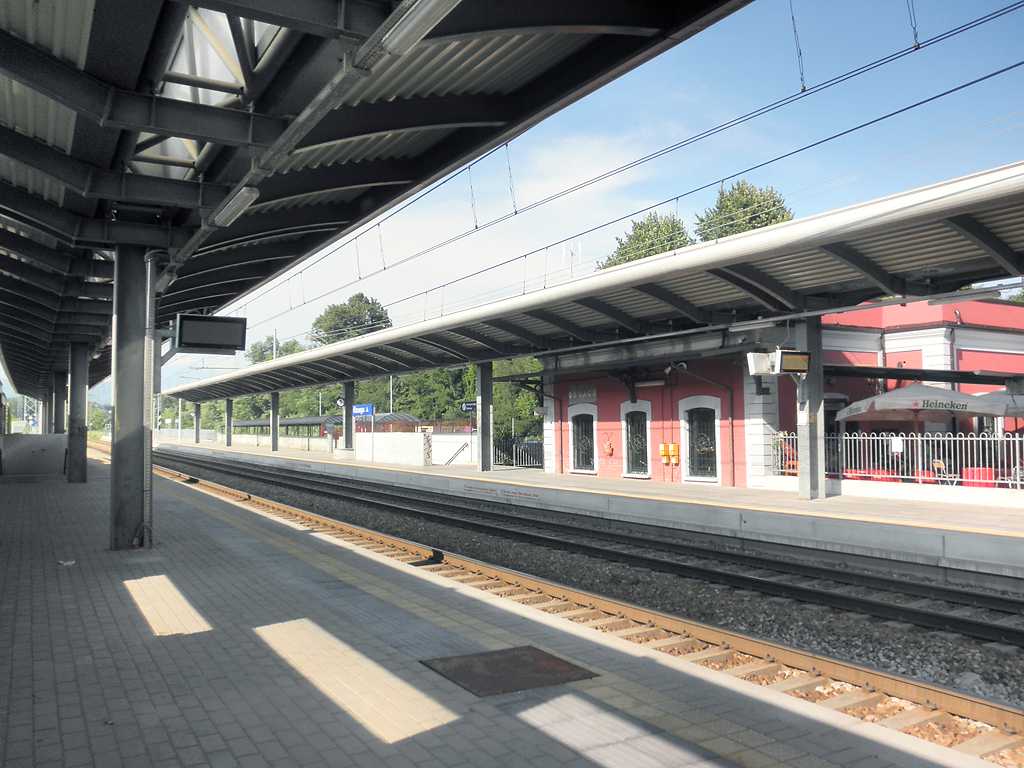

General information
- Location: Via Trieste; Osnago, Lecco, Lombardy; Italy
- Coordinates: 45°40′43″N 09°23′14″E
- Operator: Rete Ferroviaria Italiana
- Line: Lecco–Milan
- Distance: 14.850 km (9.227 mi) from Monza
- Platforms: 2
- Tracks: 2
- Train operators: Trenord

Other information
- Classification: silver

History
- Opened: 1896

Services
Preceding station	Trenord	Following station
Carnate–Usmate towards Milano Porta Garibaldi	Line S8 (Milan suburban railway service)	Cernusco–Merate towards Lecco
Location
- Location within Lombardy Location within Northern Italy Location within Italy

Osnago railway station is a railway station in Italy. Located on the Lecco–Milan railway, it serves the municipality of Osnago.

== Services ==
Osnago is served by the line S8 of the Milan suburban railway service, operated by the Lombard railway company Trenord.

== See also ==
- Milan suburban railway service
