= Villa Nava Rusconi, Monticello Brianza =

Coordinates: 45.7089°N 9.3135°E

The Villa Nava Rusconi is a Neoclassical-style, rural palace located within the town limits of Monticello Brianza, Province of Lecco, region of Lombardy, Italy.

== History ==
The villa was erected in 1820 with design by Luigi Canonica. The façade has monumental ionic pilasters arising from the Piano Nobile and two flanking wings extend forward. The rear has a large public garden. The interiors include a large oval salon.
