= List of presidents of the Province of Lecco =

President of the Province of Lecco
- Presidente della Provincia di Lecco
- Incumbent; Alessandra Hofmann since 19 December 2021
- Term length: 4 years
- Inaugural holder: Mario Anghileri
- Formation: 1995

The president of the Province of Lecco is the head of the provincial government in Lecco, Lombardy, Italy. The president oversees the administration of the province, coordinates the activities of the municipalities, and represents the province in regional and national matters.

Since December 2021, the office has been held by Alessandra Hofmann, a centre-right independent.

== History ==
The Province of Lecco was established in 1992, after being separated from the Province of Como. In its initial phase, the new province was administered by a government-appointed extraordinary commissioner, pending the organisation of its institutional bodies. Following the 1995 elections, Mario Anghileri took office as the first president of the province, marking the beginning of the province's ordinary democratic administration. In accordance with the reform of local authorities introduced in 1993, the president was directly elected by the citizens for a five-year term and was responsible for appointing and dismissing the members of the Provincial Executive.

Following the 2014 Delrio Law, the president is elected by an assembly composed of the mayors and municipal councillors of the municipalities within the province. The president serves a four-year term and acts as the legal representative of the province, presiding over the Provincial Council and the Provincial Assembly of Mayors.

== List ==
No.	Portrait	Name	Term		Party
No.	Portrait	Name	Start	End	Party
1		Mario Anghileri	8 May 1995	28 June 1999	Italian People's Party
1		Mario Anghileri	28 June 1999	28 June 2004	Italian People's Party
2		Virginio Brivio	28 June 2004	8 June 2009	The Daisy; Democratic Party
3		Daniele Nava	8 June 2009	3 June 2014	The People of Freedom
—		Stefano Simonetti (acting)	3 June 2014	14 October 2014	Lega Nord
4		Flavio Polano	14 October 2014	31 October 2018	Democratic Party
5		Claudio Usuelli	31 October 2018	19 December 2021	Independent (centre-right)
6		Alessandra Hofmann	19 December 2021	25 January 2026	Independent (centre-right)
6		Alessandra Hofmann	25 January 2026	Incumbent	Independent (centre-right)

== Sources ==
- "Storia amministrativa dell'ente". Ministero dell'Interno.
