= Palazzo Prinetti, Merate =

Palazzo in Merate, Italy

Coordinates: 45°41′52″N 9°25′0″E

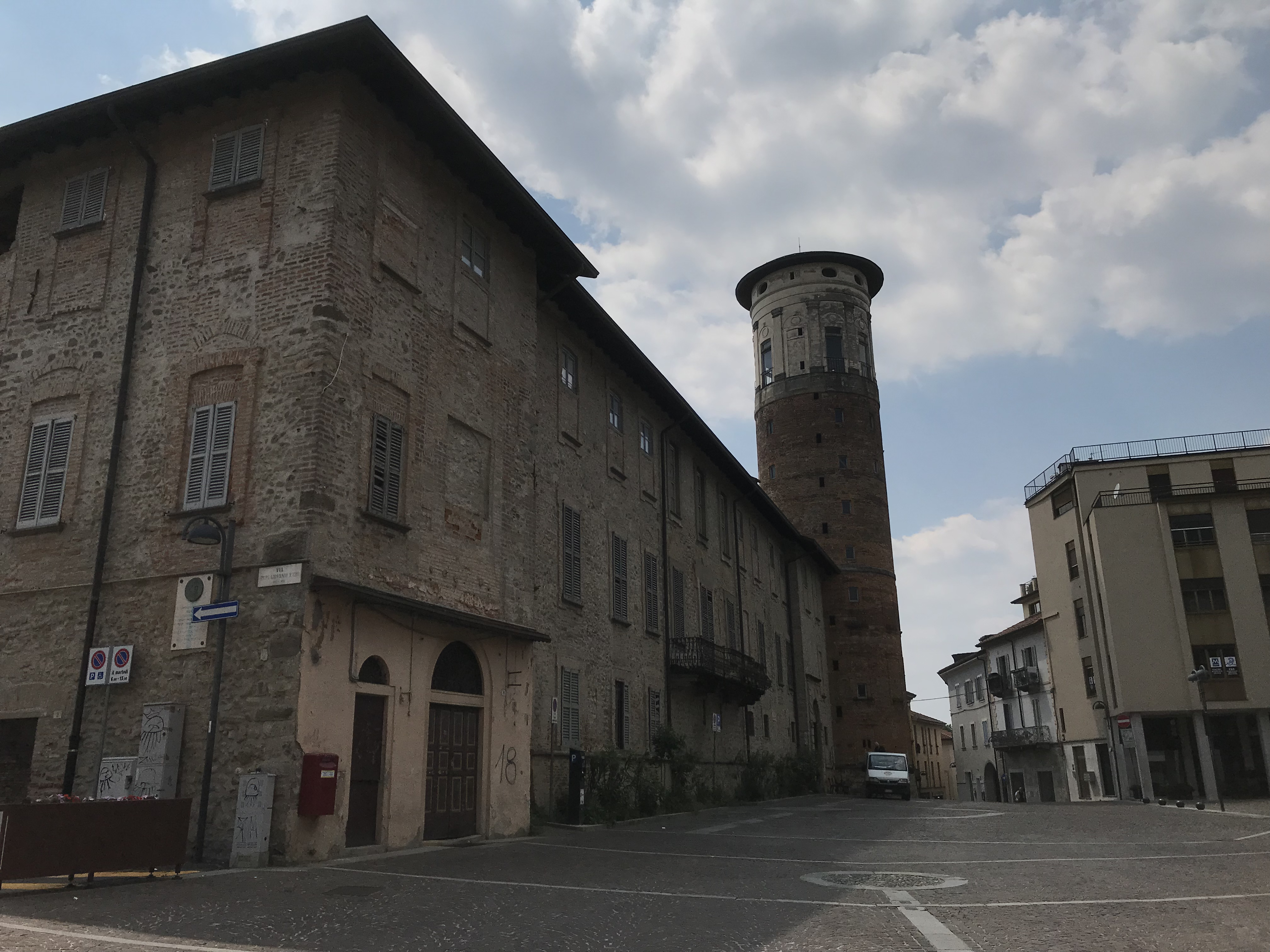

The Palazzo Prinetti is a palace located in the town of Merate, in the Province of Lecco, in the Region of Lombardy, Italy.

The palace, also known as Castello di Merate, was built initially by Archbishop Ariberto d'Intimiano as a moated castle, but destroyed in 1275 during the civil wars involving Visconti and Della Torre. The castle was inherited by the Monastery of San Dionigi of Milan.

In the 1700s, the present palace was built by the abbot Ercole Visconti. A sober urban facade (1740) and walls of brick were intended to be flanked by four towers, but only one was built. The imposing tower was later topped with Neo-renaissance style loggia. By 1810, the palace was bought by the Prinetti family. Giulio Prinetti, twice Minister of the Kingdom of Italy, modified the structure adding painted wooden ceilings. The site contains an 18th-century chapel-church dedicated to St Dionigi. In 1946, the palace was acquired by the parish, and is now mostly used for meetings and concerts.
