= Flavio Polano =

Italian politician (born 1955)

- Polano at Wikimania 2016

President of the Province of Lecco
- In office 14 October 2014 – 31 October 2018
- Preceded by: Daniele Nava
- Succeeded by: Claudio Usuelli

Mayor of Malgrate
- In office 25 May 2014 – 9 June 2024
- Preceded by: Giovanni Codega
- Succeeded by: Michele Peccati

Personal details
- Born: 25 October 1955 (age 70) Lecco, Lombardy, Italy

Flavio Polano (born 25 October 1955) is an Italian politician who served as president of the Province of Lecco from 2014 to 2018 and as mayor of Malgrate from 2014 to 2024.

In the 2014 provincial election, Polano was supported by the centre-left coalition. He served until October 2018, when he was succeeded by Claudio Usuelli. In 2024, he announced his intention not to run for any political office.
