= San Vittore, Missaglia =

Church building in Missaglia, Italy

Coordinates: 45°42′31″N 9°20′08″E

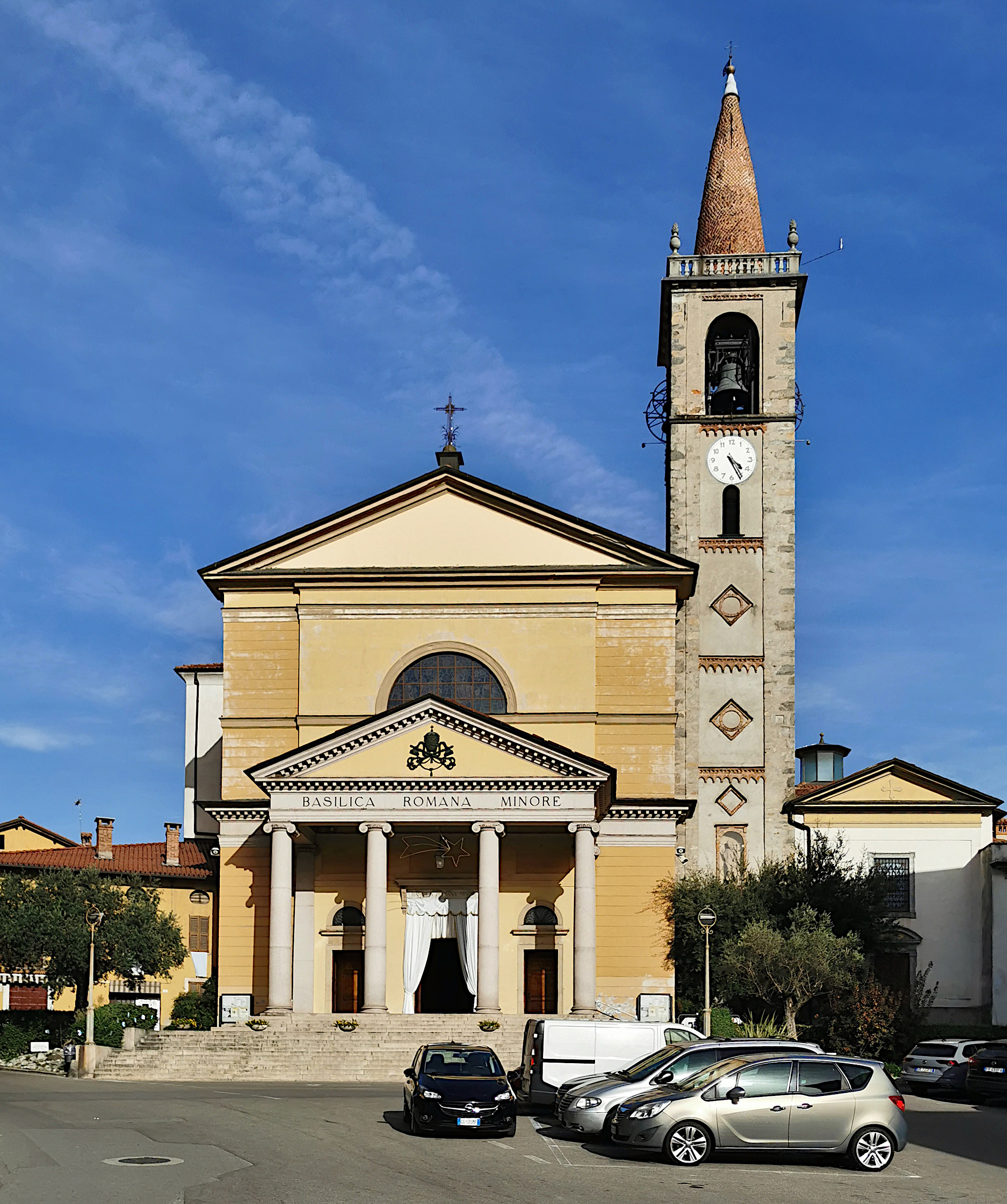
Church and bell-tower

San Vittore is a Neoclassical architecture, Roman Catholic minor basilica parish church and Marian sanctuary located at Via Conciliazione #6 in Missaglia, province of Lecco, region of Lombardy, Italy.

== History ==
Documents site a church in this region by the early 9th century. In 1129, documents cite a priest at the church. A Romanesque architecture church stood here, and was in ruins, until 1844 when construction of this church and the adjacent 40 meter bell-tower was started. The church was inaugurated in 1846. The church underwent restoration in 2000.

The main altar has a 1646 wooden statuary group depicting the Madonna of the Assumption, with a crowned Mary surrounded by angels. Putatively this icon in this church was the subject of a Marian miracle, when in June 1700, a sacristan testified that the statue had returned itself the niche (while he was absent). This led to a surge of veneration of the icon. On the 300th year of the installation of the icon, Pope Pius XII elevated to the church to the title of Minor Basilica and ordained the coronation of the icon by his papal legate (now Blessed) Alfredo Ildefonso Schuster. Funds were raised from mothers and wives who had lost their sons or spouses in the recent World War.

The interior is notable for an 1850 organ made by the Serassi family. Between 1915 and 1918 the church was frescoed by Luigi Morgari and his assistants.
