= Claudio Usuelli =

Italian politician (born 1973)

President of the Province of Lecco
- In office 31 October 2018 – 19 December 2021
- Preceded by: Flavio Polano
- Succeeded by: Alessandra Hofmann

Mayor of Nibionno
- In office 16 May 2011 – 4 October 2021
- Preceded by: Angelo Natale Negri
- Succeeded by: Laura Di Terlizzi

Personal details
- Born: 26 January 1973 (age 53) Lecco, Lombardy, Italy
- Education: University of Milan
- Profession: Lawyer

Claudio Usuelli (born 26 January 1973) is an Italian lawyer and politician who served as president of the Province of Lecco from 2018 to 2021 and as mayor of Nibionno from 2011 to 2021.

In the 2018 provincial election, Usuelli was supported by a cross-party coalition of centre-right and centre-left local administrators. His term ended in 2021 and was succeeded by Alessandra Hofmann.
