= Virginio Brivio =

Italian politician

Mayor of Lecco
- In office 30 March 2010 – 6 October 2020
- Preceded by: Antonella Faggi
- Succeeded by: Mauro Gattinoni

President of the Province of Lecco
- In office 28 June 2004 – 8 June 2009
- Preceded by: Mario Anghileri
- Succeeded by: Daniele Nava

Personal details
- Born: 19 August 1961 (age 64) Lecco, Italy
- Party: Democratic Party

Virginio Brivio (born 19 August 1961) is an Italian politician of the Democratic Party.

He served as president of the Province of Lecco from 2004 to 2009 and was elected mayor of Lecco at the 2010 Italian local elections. He took office on 30 March 2010. Brivio was re-elected for a second term on 16 June 2015.

== See also ==
- 2010 Italian local elections
- 2015 Italian local elections
- List of mayors of Lecco

Political offices
Preceded by Antonella Faggi	Mayor of Lecco; 2010-2020	Succeeded by Mauro Gattinoni
Preceded by Mario Anghileri	President of the Province of Lecco; 2004-2009	Succeeded by Daniele Nava
