= La Valletta Brianza =

- Comune
- Comune di La Valletta Brianza
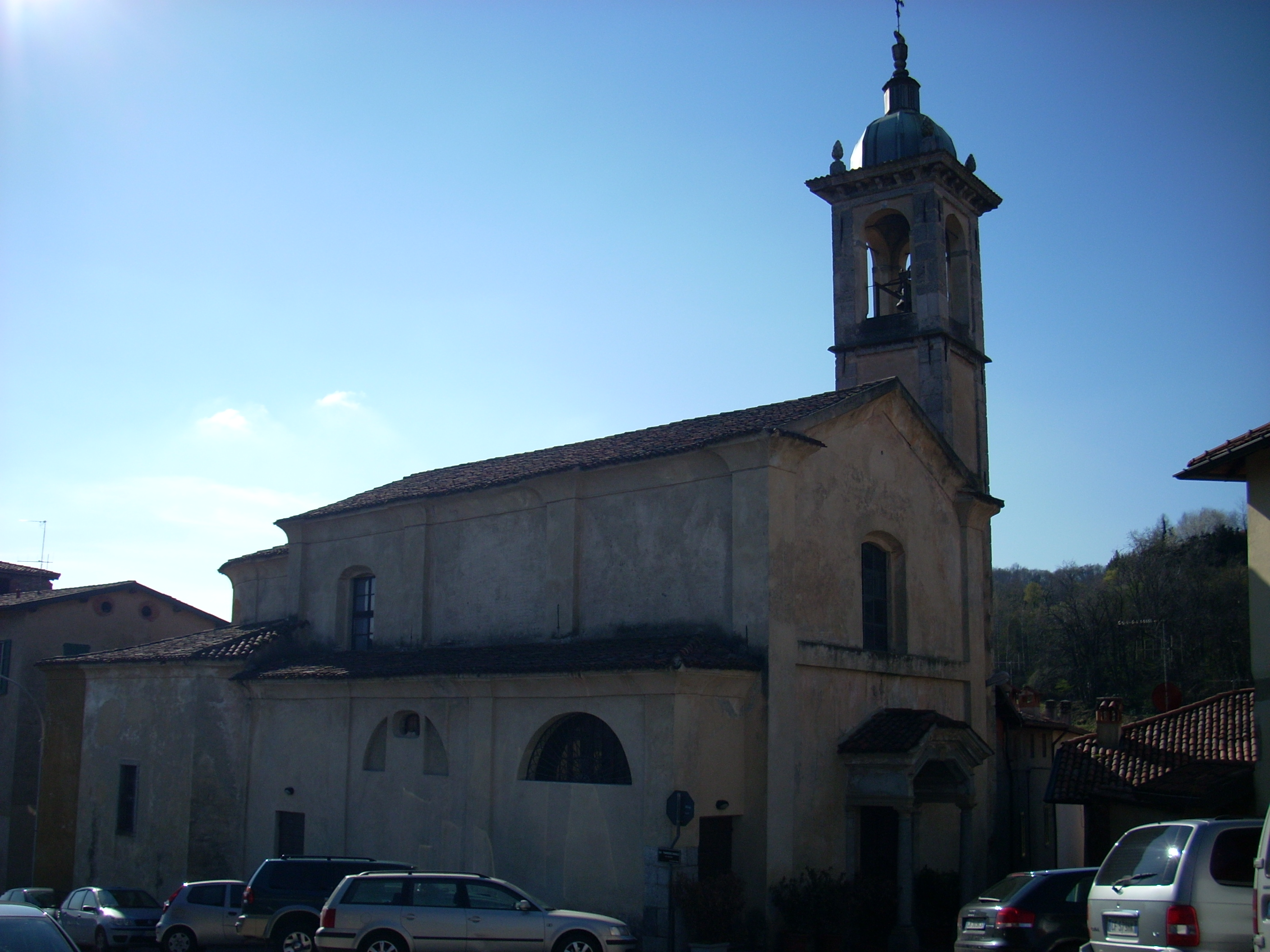
- Church of Perego.

- Location within Italy Location within Lombardy
- Coordinates: 45°44′N 9°22′E
- Country: Italy
- Region: Lombardy
- Province: Lecco (LC)
- Frazioni: i Albareda, Bagaggera, Barbabella, Bernaga, Biscioia, Brugolone, Casternago, Cerè, Cereda, Crescenzaga, Filatoio, Fornace Alta, Fornace Bassa, Francolino, Galbusera Bianca, Galbusera Nera, Lissolo, Malnido, Malpensata, Monte, Molino, Ospedaletto, Perego, Rovagnate, Sara, Spiazzo, Zerbine

Government
  - Mayor: Marco Panzeri

Area
  - Total: 8.78 km^{2} (3.39 sq mi)
- Elevation: 342 m (1,122 ft)

Population (30 January 2015)
  - Total: 4,691
  - Density: 534/km^{2} (1,380/sq mi)
- Time zone: UTC+1 (CET)
  - Summer (DST): UTC+2 (CEST)
- Postal code: 23888
- Dialing code: 039
- Website: Official website

La Valletta Brianza (Brianzöö: La Valetta [la ʋaˈlɛta]) is a comune in the province of Lecco, Lombardy, northern Italy. It was created on 30 January 2015 when the two former communes of Perego and Rovagnate merged. The communal seat is located in the latter hamlet.

It is about 35 kilometres (22 mi) northeast of Milan and about 13 kilometres (8 mi) south of Lecco.

In 2025, the nunnery at Bernaga was destroyed by fire; all 20-odd nuns escaped.
