= List of mayors of Lecco =

Mayor of Lecco
- Sindaco di Lecco
- Incumbent; Filippo Boscagli since 9 June 2026
- Appointer: Electorate of Lecco
- Term length: 5 years, renewable once
- Formation: 1860
- Website: Official website

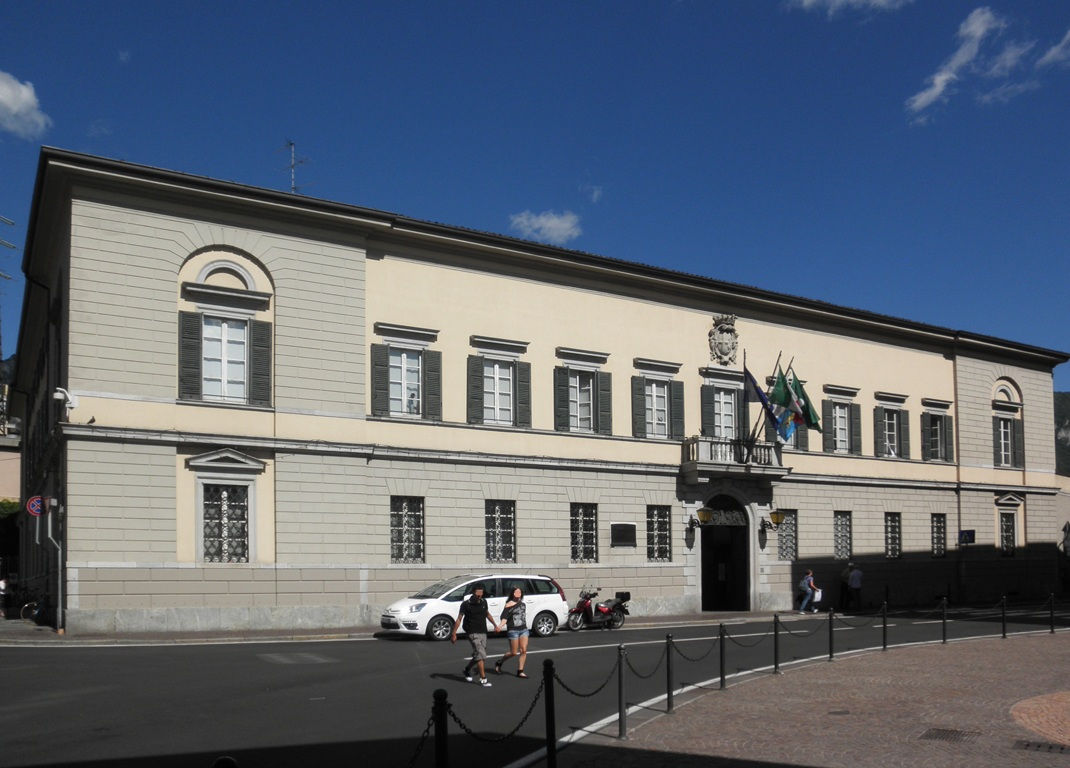
Lecco's City Hall.

The mayor of Lecco is an elected politician who, along with the Lecco City Council, is accountable for the strategic government of Lecco in Lombardy, Italy.

The current mayor is Filippo Boscagli, who took office on 9 June 2026.

== Overview ==
According to the Italian Constitution, the mayor of Lecco is member of the City Council.

The mayor is elected by the population of Lecco, who also elects the members of the City Council, controlling the mayor's policy guidelines and is able to enforce his resignation by a motion of no confidence. The mayor is entitled to appoint and release the members of his government.

Since 1993 the mayor is elected directly by Lecco's electorate: in all mayoral elections in Italy in cities with a population higher than 15,000 the voters express a direct choice for the mayor or an indirect choice voting for the party of the candidate's coalition. If no candidate receives at least 50% of votes, the top two candidates go to a second round after two weeks. The election of the City Council is based on a direct choice for the candidate with a preference vote: the candidate with the majority of the preferences is elected. The number of the seats for each party is determined proportionally.

== Republic of Italy (since 1946) ==
=== City Council election (1946–1993) ===
From 1946 to 1993, the mayor of Lecco was elected by the City Council.

	Mayor	Term start	Term end	Party
1	Giuseppe Mauri	1946	1948	PSI
2	Ugo Bartesaghi	1948	1954	DC
3	Luigi Colombo	1954	1958	DC
4	Angelo Bonaiti	1958	1962	DC
5	Alessandro Rusconi	1962	1970	DC
6	Guido Puccio	1970	1975	DC
7	Rodolfo Tirinzoni	1975	1976	DC
8	Giuseppe Resinelli	1976	1979	DC
9	Marco Calvetti	1979	1979	DC
(8)	Giuseppe Resinelli	1979	1983	DC
10	Paolo Mauri	1983	1986	DC
11	Giulio Boscagli	1986	1993	DC

=== Direct election (since 1993) ===
Since 1993, under provisions of new local administration law, the Mayor of Lecco is chosen by direct election, originally every four then every five years.

	Mayor	Term start	Term end	Party	Coalition	Election
12	Giuseppe Pogliani	20 June 1993	12 May 1997	LN	LN	1993
13	Lorenzo Bodega	12 May 1997	14 May 2001	LN	LN	1997
13	Lorenzo Bodega	14 May 2001	8 March 2006 (Note: Resigned in order to participate to the general election. The deputy Mayor held the office till a new municipal election was called.)	LN	FI • LN • AN • UDC	2001
14	Antonella Faggi	30 May 2006	28 October 2009 (Note: Ousted out of office after losing the majority in the City Council.)	LN	FI • LN • AN • UDC	2006
Special Prefectural Commissioner tenure (28 October 2009 – 30 March 2010)
15	Virginio Brivio	30 March 2010	15 June 2015	PD	PD • SEL • FdS • IdV	2010
15	Virginio Brivio	15 June 2015	6 October 2020	PD	PD	2015
16	Mauro Gattinoni	6 October 2020 (Note: Election originally scheduled for June 2020 then postponed due to the coronavirus pandemic.)	9 June 2026	Ind	PD • SI • EV	2020
17	Filippo Boscagli	9 June 2026 (Note: Election originally scheduled for September 2025 then postponed to May 2026. According to the Italian law, since 2011 local elections can take place each year only between 15 April and 15 June.)	incumbent	FdI	FdI • Lega • FI	2026
