= Rovagnate =

Frazione of La Valletta Brianza

Parish church.

Rovagnate is a frazione in the comune (municipality) of La Valletta Brianza, in the Province of Lecco, Lombardy. It is located about 35 kilometres (22 mi) northeast of Milan and about 13 kilometres (8 mi) south of Lecco. It was an autonomous commune until 30 November 2014, when it merged with Perego to form the commune of La Valletta Brianza.

In 2009 it had a population of 2940.
