= Perego, Lecco =

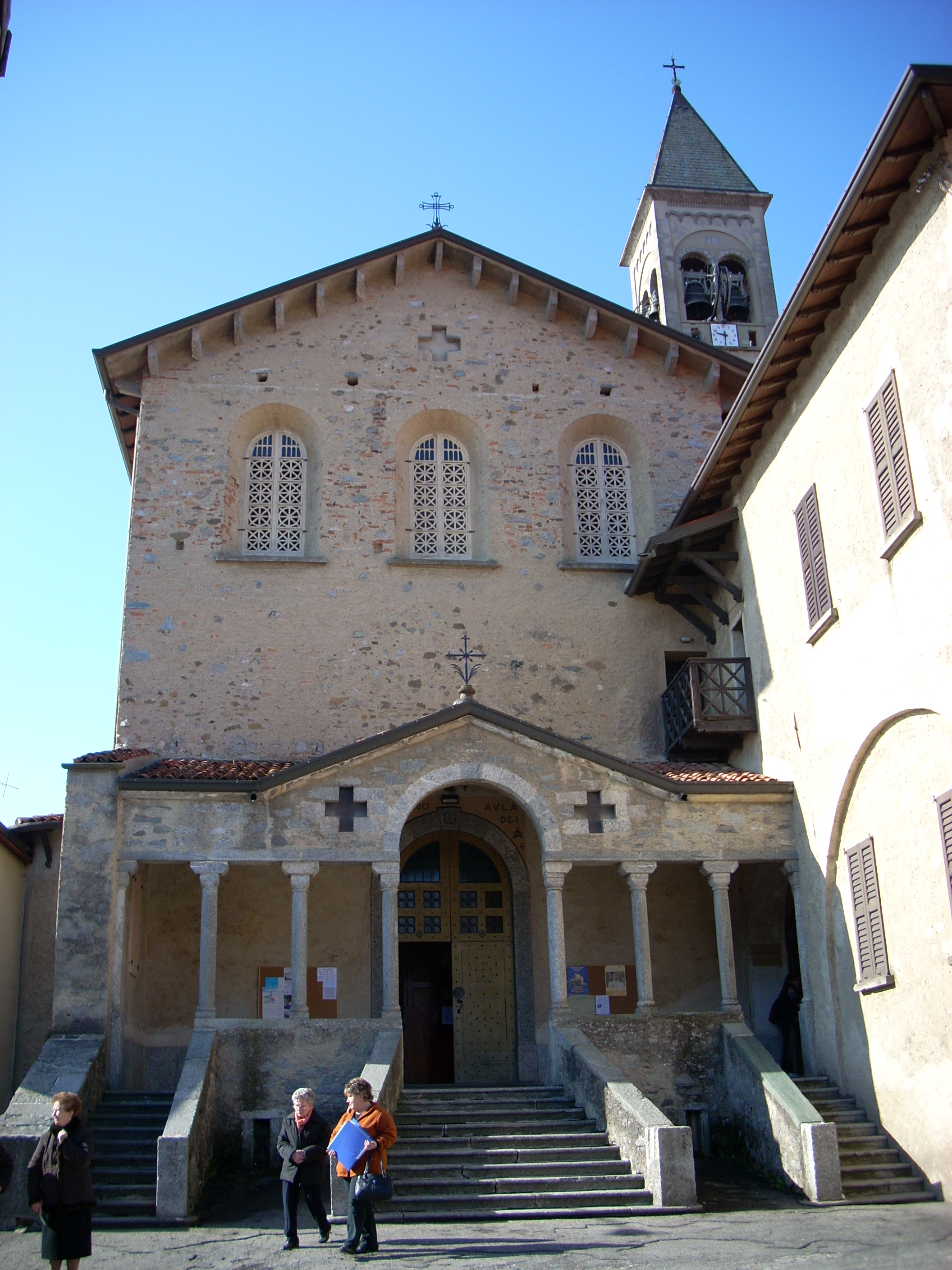
Parish church of St. John the Evangelist.

Perego is a frazione of the comune (municipality) of La Valletta Brianza in the Province of Lecco in the Italian region Lombardy.

It was an independent comune until 30 January 2015, when it merged with Rovagnate to form the new comune of La Valletta Brianza.
