= Monticello Brianza =

- Comune
- Comune di Monticello Brianza
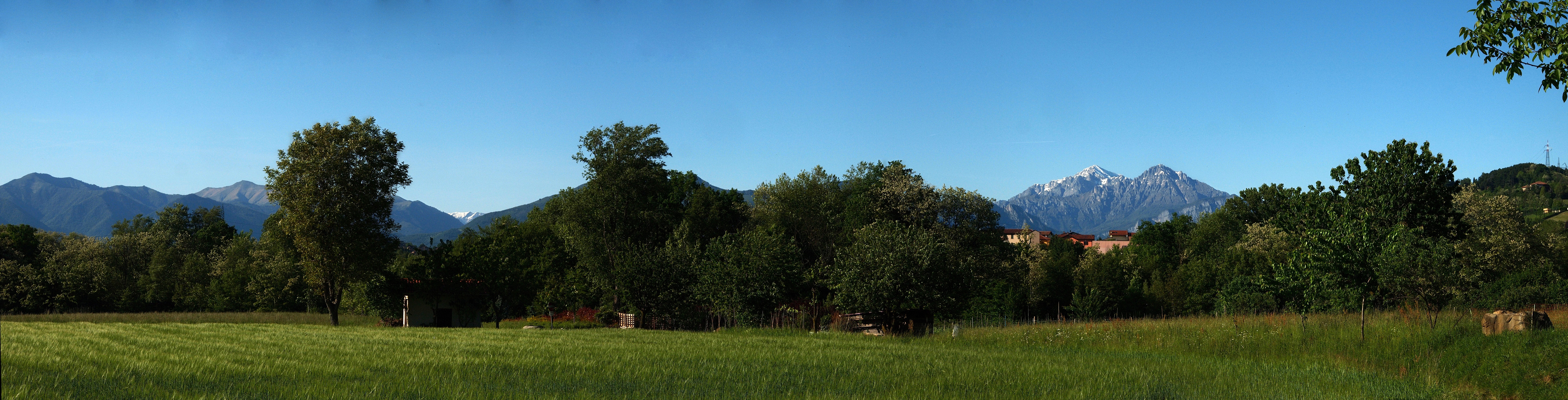
- Monticello Brianza

- Coat of arms

- Location within Italy Location within Lombardy
- Coordinates: 45°43′N 9°19′E
- Country: Italy
- Region: Lombardy
- Province: Lecco (LC)
- Frazioni: Casirago, Cortenuova, Prebone, Torrevilla

Government
  - Mayor: Alessandra Hofmann

Area
  - Total: 4.6 km^{2} (1.8 sq mi)

Population (Dec. 2004)
  - Total: 4,179
  - Density: 910/km^{2} (2,400/sq mi)
- Demonym: Monticellesi
- Time zone: UTC+1 (CET)
  - Summer (DST): UTC+2 (CEST)
- Postal code: 23876
- Dialing code: 039
- Website: Official website

Monticello Brianza (Brianzöö: Muntisèll) is a comune (municipality) in the Province of Lecco in the Italian region Lombardy, located in Brianza about 30 kilometres (19 mi) northeast of Milan and about 15 kilometres (9 mi) southwest of Lecco.

== Notable people ==
- Giuseppe Sirtori, (1813–1874) soldier and diplomat

== Points of interest ==
- Villa Nava Rusconi
