= Brivio =

Brivio Brivi / Brìe (Lombard)
- Comune
- Comune di Brivio
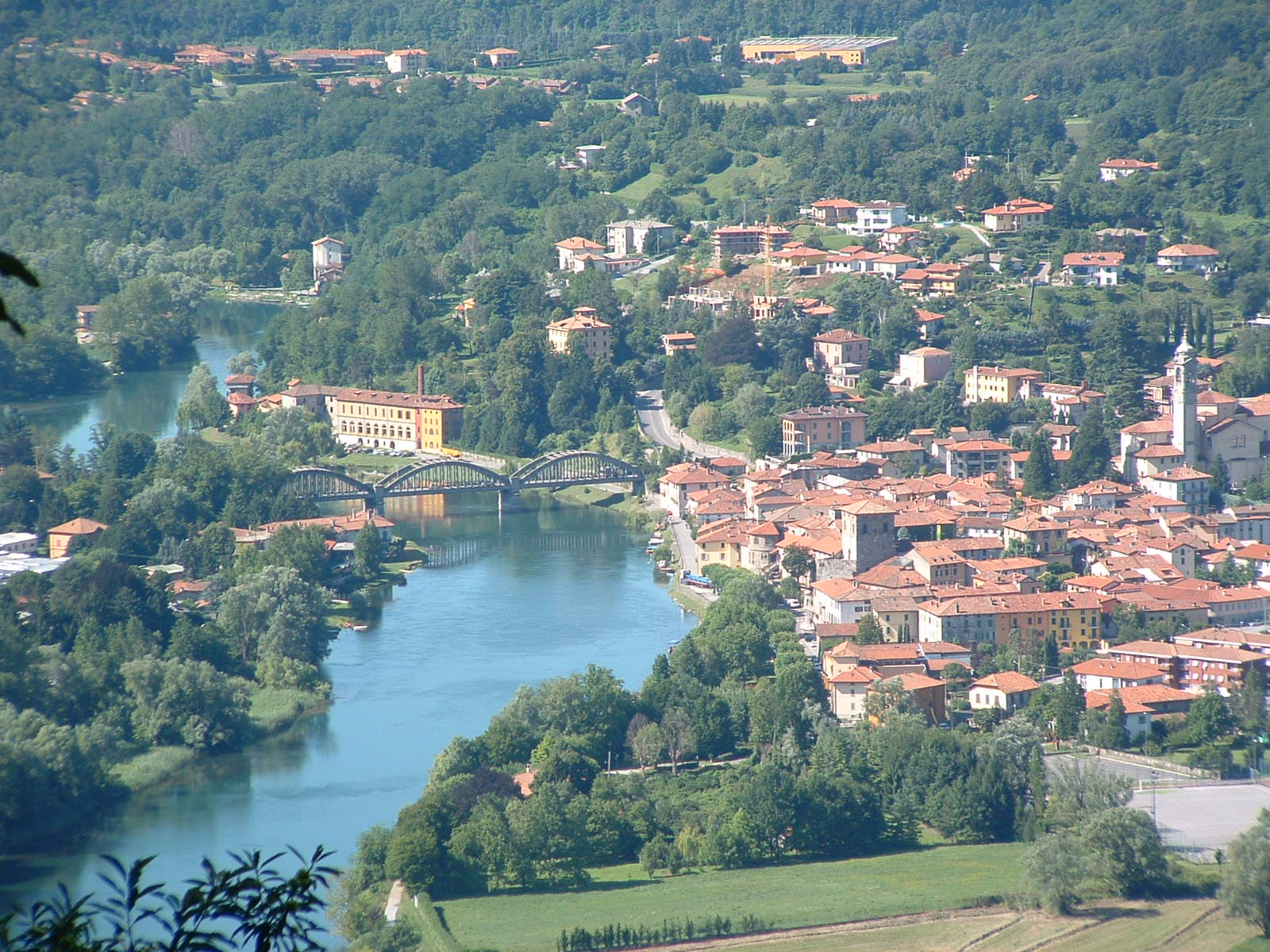
- Panorama of Brivio overlooking the Adda river

- Coat of arms

- Location within Italy Location within Lombardy
- Coordinates: 45°45′N 09°27′E
- Country: Italy
- Region: Lombardy
- Province: Lecco (LC)
- Frazioni: Beverate, Vaccarezza, Foppaluera, Canosse, Molinazzo, Toffo, Foino, Bastiglia, Palazzetto, Butto

Government
  - Mayor: Federico Airoldi

Area
  - Total: 7.95 km^{2} (3.07 sq mi)
- Elevation: 208 m (682 ft)

Population (April 30, 2017)
  - Total: 4,613
  - Density: 580/km^{2} (1,500/sq mi)
- Demonym: Briviesi
- Time zone: UTC+1 (CET)
  - Summer (DST): UTC+2 (CEST)
- Postal code: 23883
- Dialing code: 039
- Patron saint: Sisinnius, Martyrius and Alexander
- Saint day: Third Sunday in September
- Website: Official website

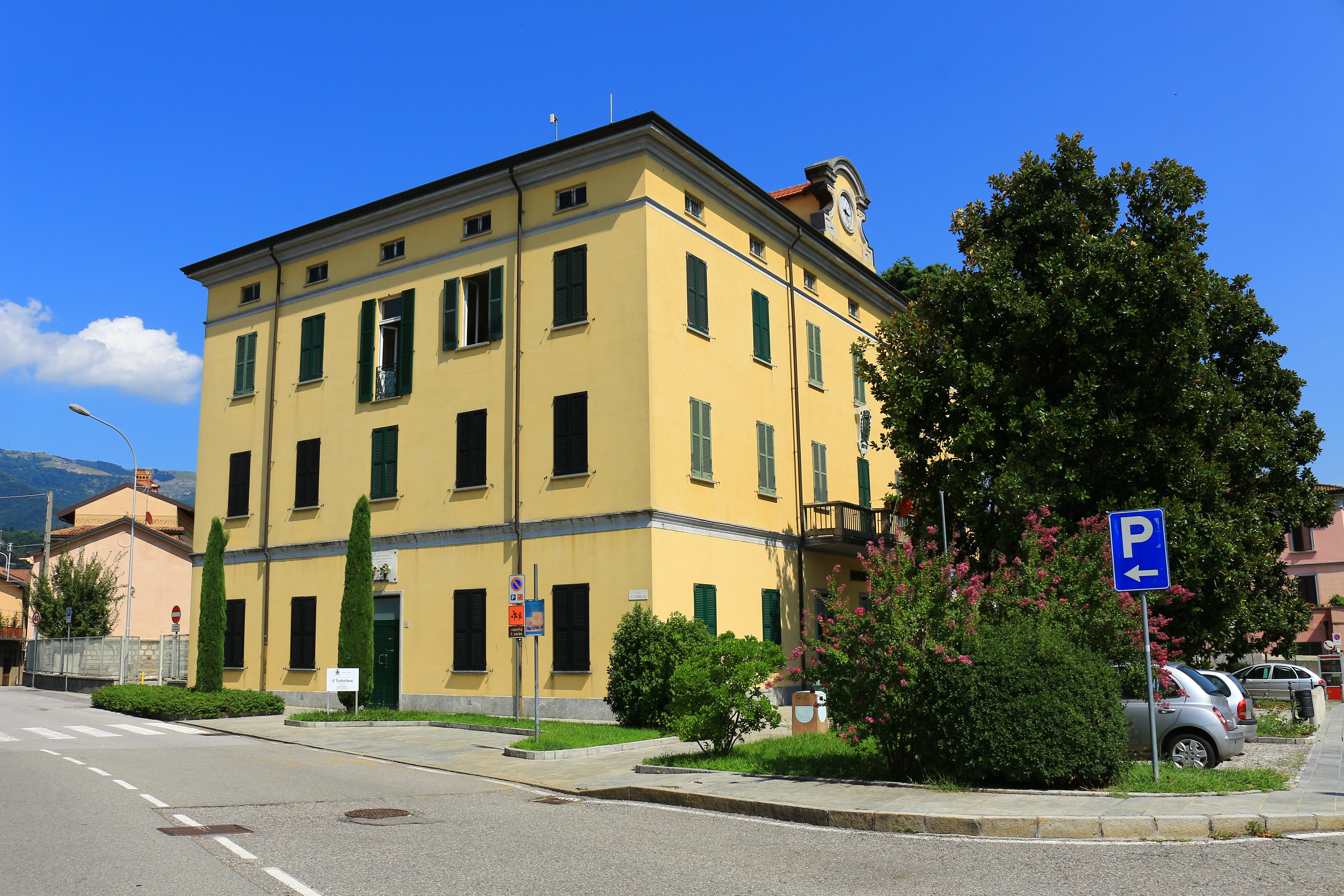
Town hall of Brivio

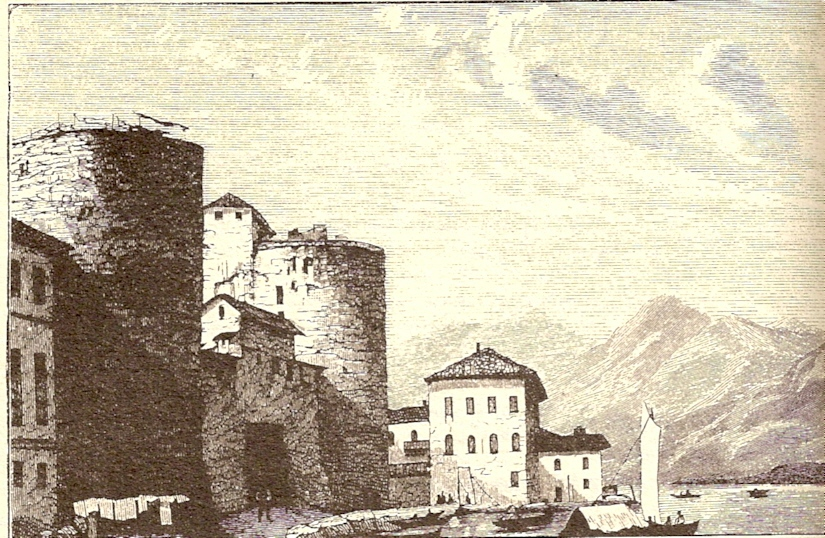
The Castle of Brivio in a 19th-century etching

Brivio (Brianzöö: Brivi, Bergamasque: Brìe) is a town and comune (municipality) in the province of Lecco, in the Lombardy region of northern Italy, at the border with the province of Bergamo. Located in the historical subregion of Brianza, is served by Olgiate-Calco-Brivio railway station.
