= Osnago =

Osnago Osnagh (Lombard)
- Comune
- Comune di Osnago
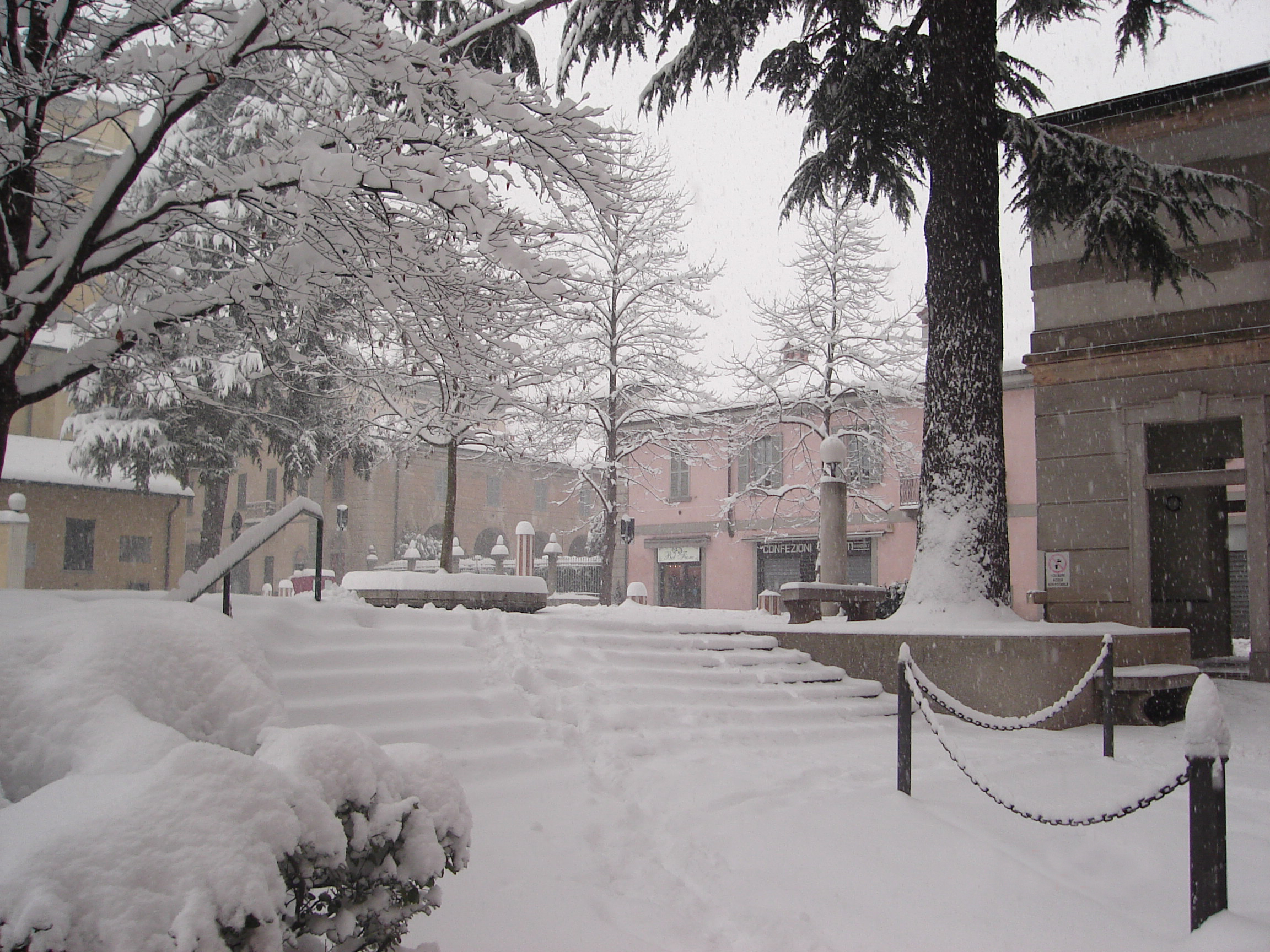

- Coat of arms

- Location within Italy Location within Lombardy
- Coordinates: 45°41′N 09°23′E
- Country: Italy
- Region: Lombardy
- Province: Lecco (LC)

Government
  - Mayor: Paolo Brivio (since June 14, 2014)

Area
  - Total: 4 km^{2} (1.5 sq mi)

Population (2018-01-01)
  - Total: 4,357
  - Density: 1,100/km^{2} (2,800/sq mi)
- Time zone: UTC+1 (CET)
  - Summer (DST): UTC+2 (CEST)
- Postal code: 23875
- Dialing code: 039
- Website: www.comune.osnago.lc.it

Osnago (Brianzoeu: Osnagh [uzˈnaːk]) is a town and comune in the province of Lecco, in Lombardy, Italy. It is served by Osnago railway station.
