= Merate =

Merate Meraa (Lombard)
- Comune
- Città di Merate
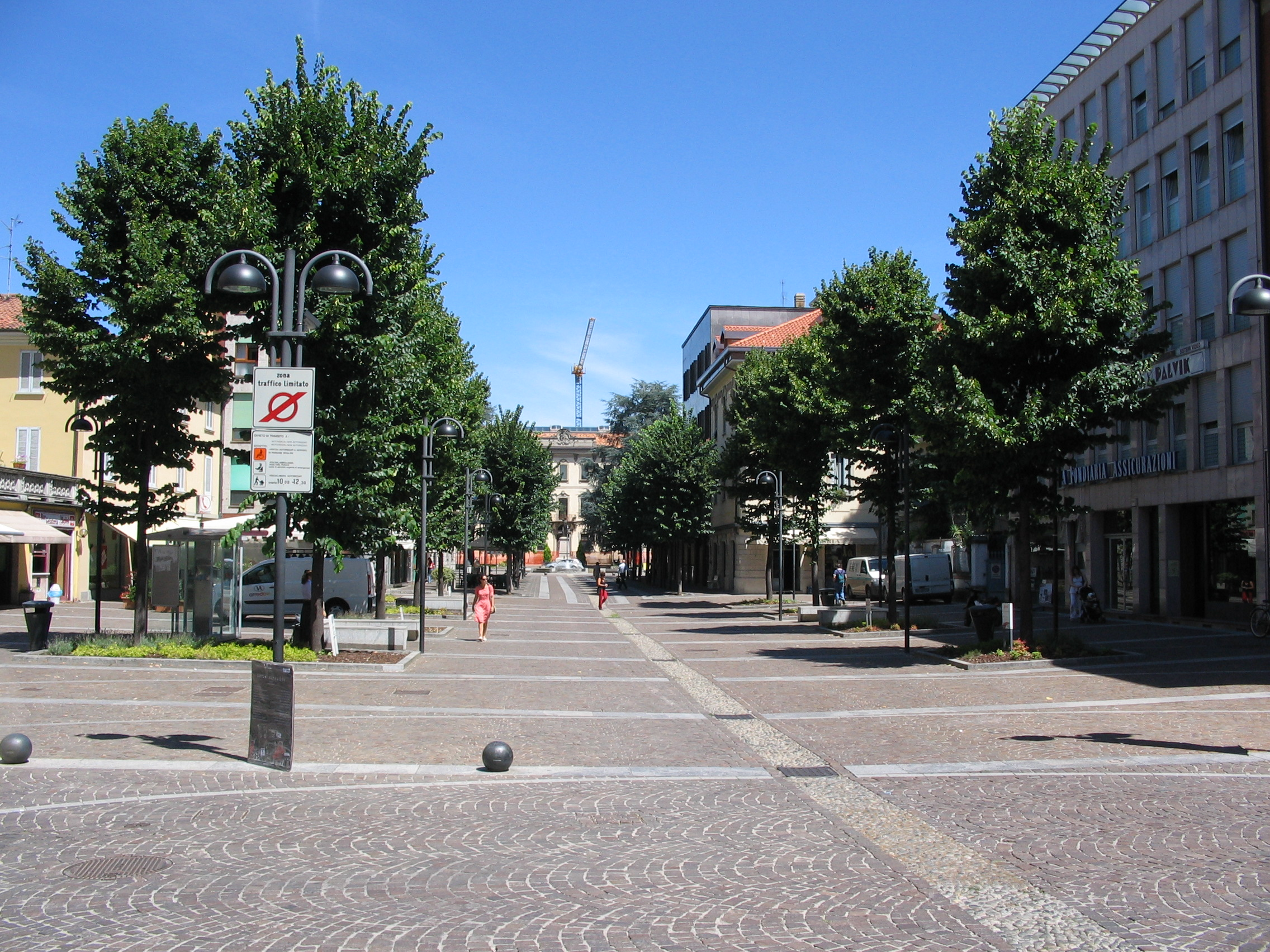
- Piazza Prinetti

- Coat of arms

- Location within Italy Location within Lombardy
- Coordinates: 45°42′N 9°26′E
- Country: Italy
- Region: Lombardy
- Province: Lecco (LC)
- Frazioni: Brugarolo, Cassina Fra Martino, Novate Brianza, Pagnano, Sartirana

Area
  - Total: 11 km^{2} (4.2 sq mi)
- Elevation: 292 m (958 ft)

Population (31 May 2024)
  - Total: 15,020
  - Density: 1,400/km^{2} (3,500/sq mi)
- Demonym: Meratesi
- Time zone: UTC+1 (CET)
  - Summer (DST): UTC+2 (CEST)
- Postal code: 23807
- Dialing code: 039
- Patron saint: St. Ambrose
- Saint day: December 7
- Website: Official website

Merate (/məˈrɑːteɪ/; Brianzöö: Meraa) is a municipality of 15.020 inhabitants in the province of Lecco, in the northern Italian region of Lombardy. It is served by Cernusco-Merate railway station.

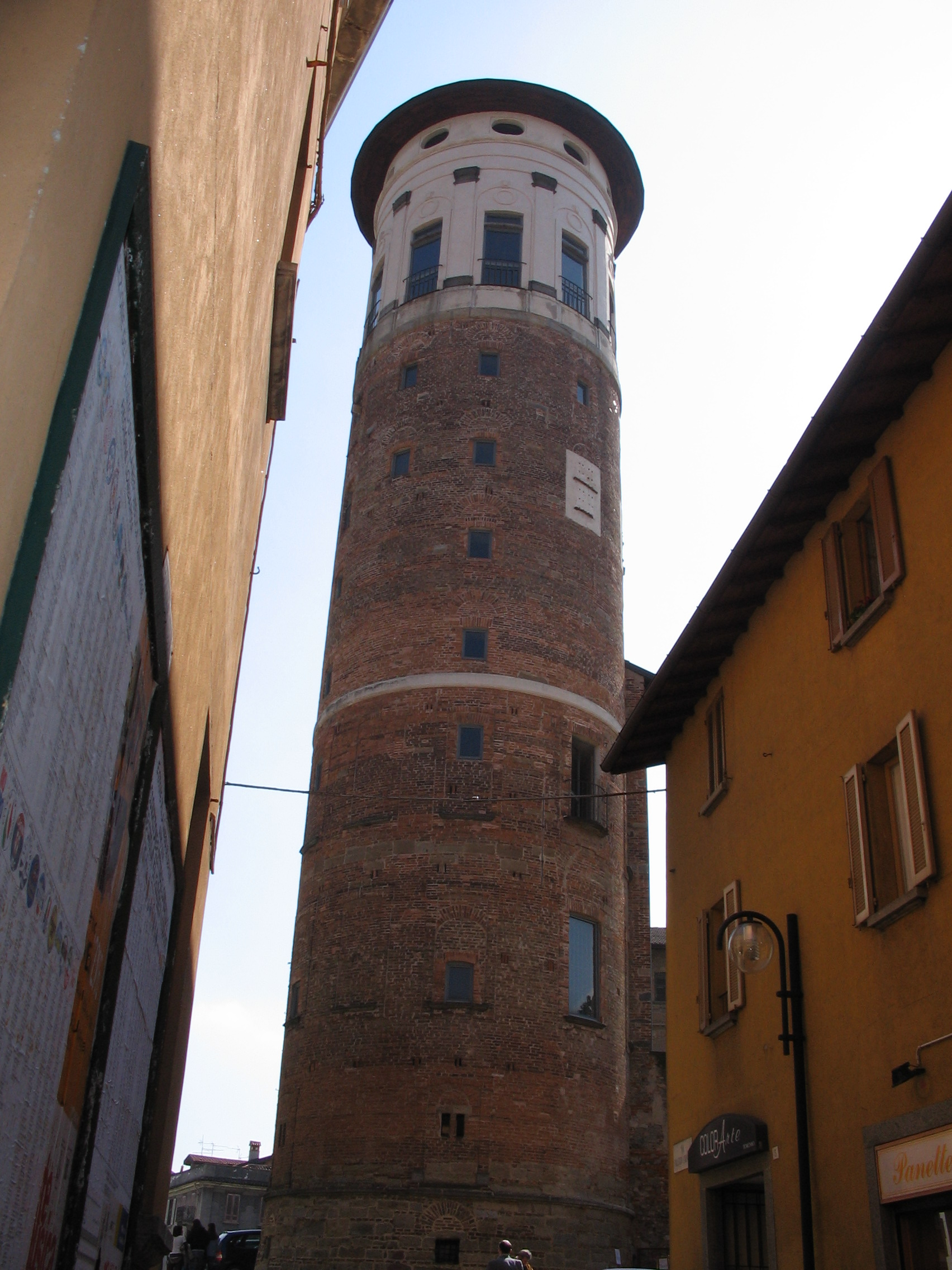
The tower of Merate.

== History ==
The name Melatum appeared for the first time in the 4th century; it may be derived from the Greek for black/gloomy/dark because of the presence of woods, or from the Italian for apple (mela): an important fruit from the region.

During the fighting between the Torriani and the Visconti families for the supremacy of Milan, Merate (in particular the castle) suffered considerable damage. It recovered during the 17th century after being decimated by the plague; finally becoming one of the richest towns of the region, after Lecco.

At the beginning of the 16th century an academic institute was constructed: at the end of the 18th century the young writer/poet Alessandro Manzoni studied at this school, and after his death the school took on his name.

After the unification of Italy Merate grew as an industrial centre with the development of the banking and textile industries. At the end of the 19th century, it became one of the first Italian towns to have electricity, gas and piped drinking water.

The interwar period saw considerable development of the mechanical and textile industries.

In 1926 the astronomical observatory was constructed, and in the same year the municipality was enlarged, incorporating many neighbouring communities.

Industry continued to increase after the Second World War. The population passed to 9,000 inhabitants in 1951, and is 14,000 today. Merate received the honorary title of city with a presidential decree in 1991.

== Main sights ==
- Palazzo Prinetti (18th century), with a high cylindrical tower
- Villa Confalonieri (late 19th century)
- Villa Baslini
- Villa Belvedere
- Villa "Il Mombello"
- Villa "Il Subaglio"
- The Santctuary of Madonna del Bosco (17th century), housing a Deposition by Domenico Campi.

== Astronomical observatory ==
Starting from the end 19th century light pollution from Milan disturbed the activities of the Brera astronomical observatory. However, the idea to construct a new observatory outside the City was not realized until the 1920s with the acquisition of the villa San Rocco: this used to be a Capuchin monastery before becoming a private villa and then a psychiatric clinic following the First World War.

Today Brianza is one of the most densely populated regions of Italy and the light pollution is considerable. Nonetheless, the observatory is still used for research activities (leader in the production of X-ray optics), as well as course- and thesis-work for the students of Milan University.

== Twinned towns ==
- Buzançais, France
- Kappeln, Germany

== Mayors of Merate from 1860 (from municipality website) ==
- 1860 - 1861 Federico Sala
- 1861 - 1864 Berengario Barbiano di Belgiojoso
- 1864 - 1870 Luigi Prinetti
- 1870 - 1886 Carlo Cornaggia
- 1887 - 1893 Vitale Bianchi
- 1893 - 1899 Antonio Baslini
- 1900 - 1905 Giambattista Colombo
- 1905 - 1920 Carlo Baslini
- 1920 - 1922 Mario Bevilacqua
- 1922 - 1923 Alessandro Tettamanti
- 1924 - 1925 Carlo Baslini
- 1926 - 1943 Carlo Baslini (podestà)
- 1945 - 1946 Gerolamo Bonfanti Palazzi
- 1946 - 1946 Alessandro Tettamanti
- 1946 - 1960 Mario Sala
- 1960 - 1964 Enrico Ferrario
- 1964 - 1975 Luigi Zappa
- 1975 - 1985 Giuseppe Ghezzi
- 1985 - 1990 Giacomo Romerio
- 1990 - 1995 Mario Gallina
- 1995 - 2004 Dario Perego
- 2004 - 2009 Giovanni Battista Albani
- 2009 - 2014 Andrea Ambrogio Robbiani
- 2014 - 2019 Andrea Massironi
- 2019 - 2024 Massimo Augusto Panzeri
- 2024 - incumbent Mattia Salvioni
