= Valvarrone =

Valvarrone Valvarron (Lombard)
- Comune
- Comune di Valvarrone
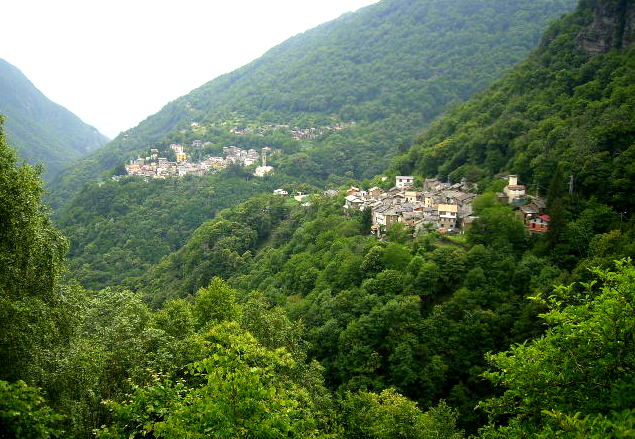
- Panorama of Tremenico

- Location within Italy Location within Lombardy
- Coordinates: 46°4′49.8″N 9°20′32.28″E
- Country: Italy
- Region: Lombardy
- Province: Lecco (LC)
- Frazioni: Introzzo, Tremenico, Vestreno, Avano, Posol, Acque, Grasagne, Bondal, Masatele

Government
  - Mayor: Stefano Simeone

Area
  - Total: 14.83 km^{2} (5.73 sq mi)

Population (31 December 2016)
  - Total: 592
  - Density: 39.9/km^{2} (103/sq mi)
- Demonym: valvarronesi
- Time zone: UTC+1 (CET)
  - Summer (DST): UTC+2 (CEST)
- Postal code: 23836
- Dialing code: 0341
- Website: Official website

Valvarrone (Valvarronese: Valvarron) is a comune (municipality) in the Province of Lecco in the Italian region Lombardy.

It was established on 1 January 2018 by the merger of the Introzzo, Tremenico and Vestreno municipalities.
