= Dervio =

Dervio Derf (Lombard)
- Comune
- Comune di Dervio
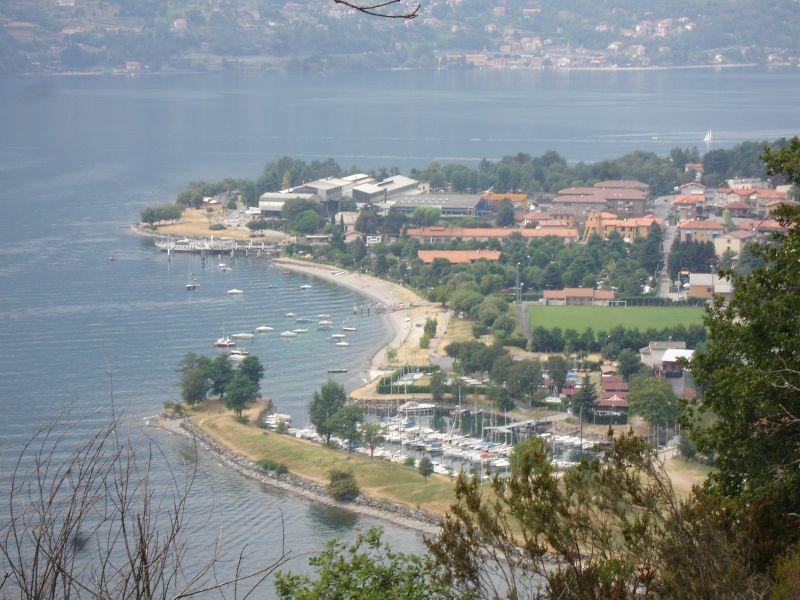

- Location within Italy Location within Lombardy
- Coordinates: 46°5′N 9°18′E
- Country: Italy
- Region: Lombardy
- Province: Lecco (LC)
- Frazioni: Corenno Plinio, Castello, Monastero, Borgo, La Foppa, Pianezzo, Monte, Roncacci, Villa, Balma, Ronchi di Vesgallo[1]

Government
  - Mayor: Cassinelli

Area
  - Total: 11.7 km^{2} (4.5 sq mi)
- Elevation: 220 m (720 ft)

Population (31 July 2017)
  - Total: 2,627
  - Density: 225/km^{2} (582/sq mi)
- Demonym: Derviesi
- Time zone: UTC+1 (CET)
  - Summer (DST): UTC+2 (CEST)
- Postal code: 23824
- Dialing code: 0341
- ISTAT code: 097030
- Patron saint: Sts. Peter and Paul
- Saint day: 29 June
- Website: www.comune.dervio.lc.it/hh/index.php

Dervio (Comasco: Derf [ˈdɛrf]) is a comune (municipality) in the Province of Lecco in the Italian region Lombardy, located on the eastern shore of Lake Como, about 70 kilometres (43 mi) north of Milan and about 25 kilometres (16 mi) northwest of Lecco. It is located on a peninsula with same name on the Lake Como, at the mouth of the Varrone river Valley.

Dervio borders the following municipalities: Bellano, Cremia, Dorio, Introzzo, Pianello del Lario, San Siro, Sueglio, Tremenico, Vendrogno, Vestreno.

== Main sights ==
- Church of St. Quirico and Giulitta, one of the oldest religious buildings in the area, mentioned in documents as early as 814. Its Romanesque stone bell tower was built about 1080.
- Parish Church of St. Peter and St. Paul (11th century) and its Romanesque bell tower
- Orezia Castle, on a cliff dominating the town. It was built in the late Middle Ages to block the road to Valvarrone Valley. This tower is still in good condition and is flanked by the ruins of ancient dwellings. The first mention of it dates back to 1039 when it sustained a long period of siege by the armies of the Three Larian Parishes.
- Ruins of Castelvedro (5th-6th centuries) located in Mai (400m) on the headland dominating the southern part of Dervio. The fortification is in a commanding position and the ruins of its massive walls are an indication of its significant size. It was part of a defence system created on the shores of Lake Como due to the raids by the barbarians from Rhaetia.
- The Medieval village of Corenno Plinio, positioned around the castle and church on top of the headland.

== See also ==
- Lake Como Golf Club
