= San Siro, Como =

San Siro San Sir (Lombard)
- Comune
- Comune di San Siro
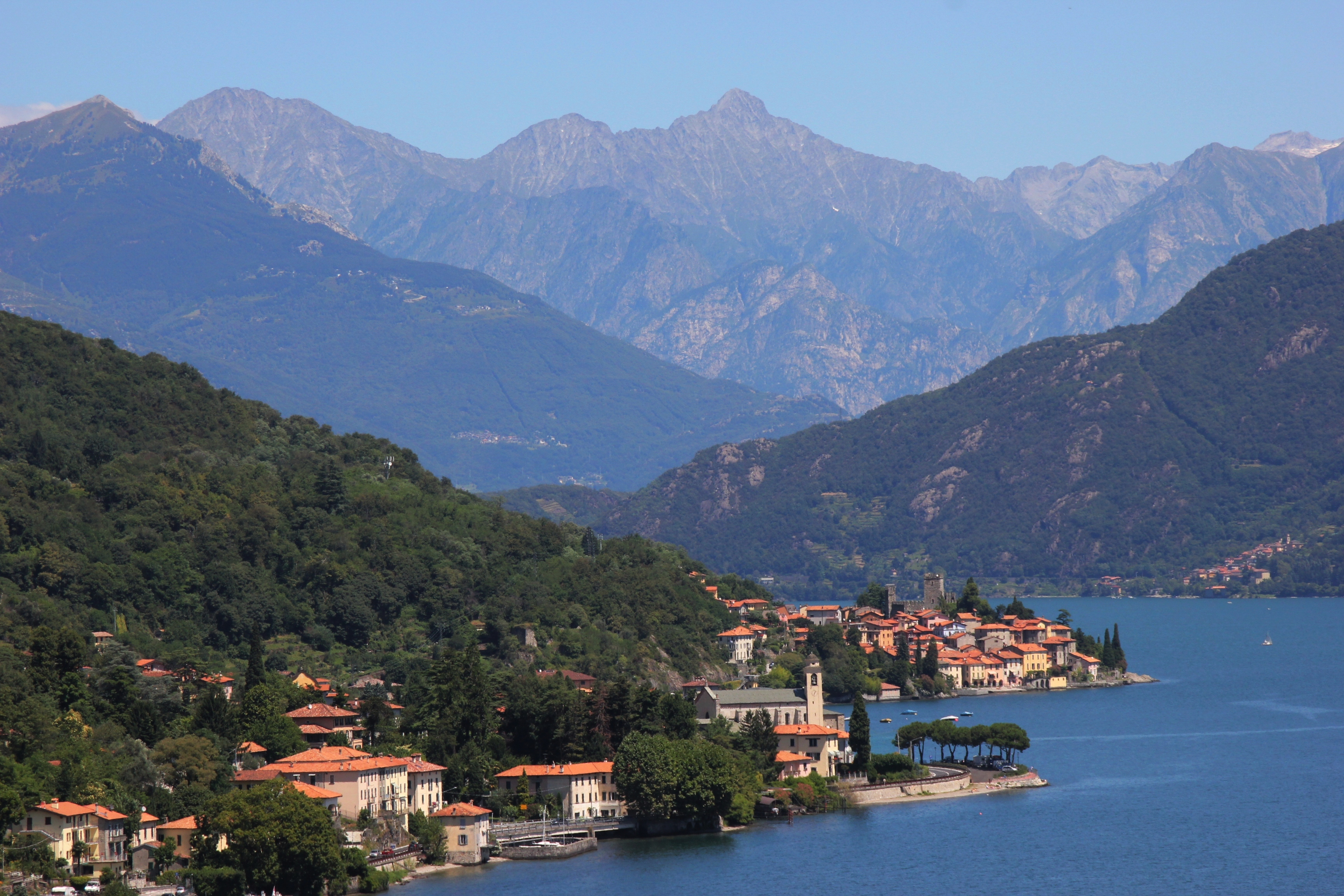

- Flag

- Location within Italy Location within Lombardy
- Coordinates: 46°4′N 9°16′E
- Country: Italy
- Region: Lombardy
- Province: Como (CO)

Government
  - Mayor: Nicola Mappa

Area
  - Total: 18.55 km^{2} (7.16 sq mi)
- Elevation: 220 m (720 ft)

Population (31 December 2010)
  - Total: 1,804
  - Density: 97.25/km^{2} (251.9/sq mi)
- Demonym: Sansiresi
- Time zone: UTC+1 (CET)
  - Summer (DST): UTC+2 (CEST)
- Postal code: 22010
- Dialing code: 0344
- Website: Official website

San Siro (Comasco: San Sir [ˌsãː ˈsiːr]) is a comune (municipality) in the Province of Como in the Italian region Lombardy, located on the west shore of Lake Como immediately north of Menaggio and south of Cremia.

The comune was formed on March 30, 2003, by the merger of the former comuni of Sant'Abbondio and Santa Maria Rezzonico.

== Geography ==
The comune of San Siro incorporates the frazioni (municipal fractions) of Acquaseria, Camnasco, Carcente, Gallio, La Torre, Lancio Lucena, Marena, Mastena, Maso, Molvedo, Noledo, Pezzo, Rezzonico, Roncate, Santa Maria, San Martino, Soriano and Trecciano.

San Siro borders the following municipalities: Cremia, Menaggio, Plesio; and, on the other side of the lake in the Province of Lecco: Bellano, Dervio and Perledo.

== Etymology ==
The etymology of Rezzonico has different hypotheses. One theory suggests that it derives from the Rhaetic people, an Alpine tribe from Northeast Italy and the area which today comprises Switzerland and Tyrol, Austria. Another theory claims that the term derived from an Etruscan general, Rhaeto, who supposedly lived in the area. Finally, the name may derive from risculada, a local term which describes the town's specific type of cobblestone paving.

== History ==
The origins of the settlement of Rezzonico are also debated. It may have been founded by the Orobii, a Celtic tribe which was settled in the areas around Como, Lecco and Bergamo, between the River Ticino and Oglio; there may have been an Etruscan origin of the settlement too; or it may have been founded by other Gaulish tribes, possibly even the Senones. All these hypotheses are possible due to traces of each of these peoples having been found in the nearby areas.

What is certain is the existence of a Roman settlement in the area, as testified by Livy himself. There are other pieces of evidence in regards to the settlement's Roman period; such include two tablets inscribed in Latin (which are now held in Menaggio and Milan) and the remnants of a wall which dates to this era.

Sights include the Rezzonico Castle, the 15th century church of Santa Maria and the Villa Gaeta, designed in 1920 by the studio of Gino Coppedè.
