= Alessandro Ghinelli =

Italian politician (born 01.08.1951)

Mayor of Arezzo
- In office 16 June 2015 – 11 June 2026
- Preceded by: Giuseppe Fanfani
- Succeeded by: Marcello Comanducci

Member of the Provincial Council of Arezzo
- In office 9 January 2017 – 31 October 2018

Personal details
- Born: 1 August 1952 (age 74) Pistoia, Italy
- Party: National Alliance (1999-2009); The People of Freedom (2009-2013); Independent (since 2013)
- Education: University of Florence
- Profession: Engineer

Alessandro Ghinelli (born 1 August 1951) is an Italian politician.

Former member of right-wing party National Alliance, he ran for Mayor of Arezzo as an independent at the 2015 Italian local elections, supported by a centre-right coalition formed by Lega Nord, Forza Italia, Brothers of Italy and the civic list "Ora Ghinelli". He was elected Mayor of Arezzo and took office on 16 June 2015.

== Life and career ==
After earning a degree in civil engineering from the University of Florence in 1978, Ghinelli has worked as an engineer ever since. From June 1992 to February 2000, he served as a council member of the Order of Engineers of the Province of Arezzo.

He worked as an engineer until 1999, when he became a council member on the administration of Arezzo’s Forza Italia mayor, Luigi Lucherini, taking charge of public works, infrastructure, urban development, traffic, and the municipal police. He remained a council member until 2006.

In September 2013, he became a member of the expert panel appointed by the Emilia-Romagna Regional Council to evaluate projects for the consolidation of the foundation soil of buildings rendered uninhabitable following the 2012 Emilia earthquake and to conduct seismic microzonation.

In the 2015 municipal elections, he ran for mayor of Arezzo at the head of a center-right coalition (OraGhinelli, Forza Italia (2013), Lega Nord, and Brothers of Italy), and was elected in the runoff with 50.83% of the vote. Five years later, he ran again, backed by the coalition’s four lists and the Civitas Etruria Arezzo civic list: in the first round, he received 47% of the vote compared to 35% for his center-left opponent, and in the runoff, he prevailed once again with 54.5%.

In May 2024, during the 2024 European Parliament election, he ran as a candidate on the Forza Italia ticket for the central district, but with approximately 1,600 votes, he finished second to last and was not elected.

== See also ==
- 2015 Italian local elections
- List of mayors of Arezzo

Political offices
Preceded by Giuseppe Fanfani	Mayor of Arezzo; 2015–2026	Succeeded by Marcello Comanducci
