= Casargo =

Casargo Casarch (Lombard)
- Comune
- Comune di Casargo
- Location within Italy Location within Lombardy
- Coordinates: 46°3′N 9°23′E
- Country: Italy
- Region: Lombardy
- Province: Lecco (LC)
- Frazioni: Codesino, Indovero, Narro, Somadino

Government
  - Mayor: Pina Scarpa

Area
  - Total: 19.71 km^{2} (7.61 sq mi)
- Elevation: 804 m (2,638 ft)

Population (31 May 2017)
  - Total: 838
  - Density: 42.5/km^{2} (110/sq mi)
- Demonym: Casarghesi
- Time zone: UTC+1 (CET)
  - Summer (DST): UTC+2 (CEST)
- Postal code: 23831
- Dialing code: 0341
- Website: Official website

Casargo (Valassinese Lombard: Casarch) is a comune (municipality) in the Province of Lecco in the Italian region Lombardy, located about 70 kilometres (43 mi) north of Milan and about 20 kilometres (12 mi) north of Lecco.

Casargo borders the following municipalities: Crandola Valsassina, Margno, Pagnona, Premana, Primaluna, Taceno, Tremenico, Vendrogno.

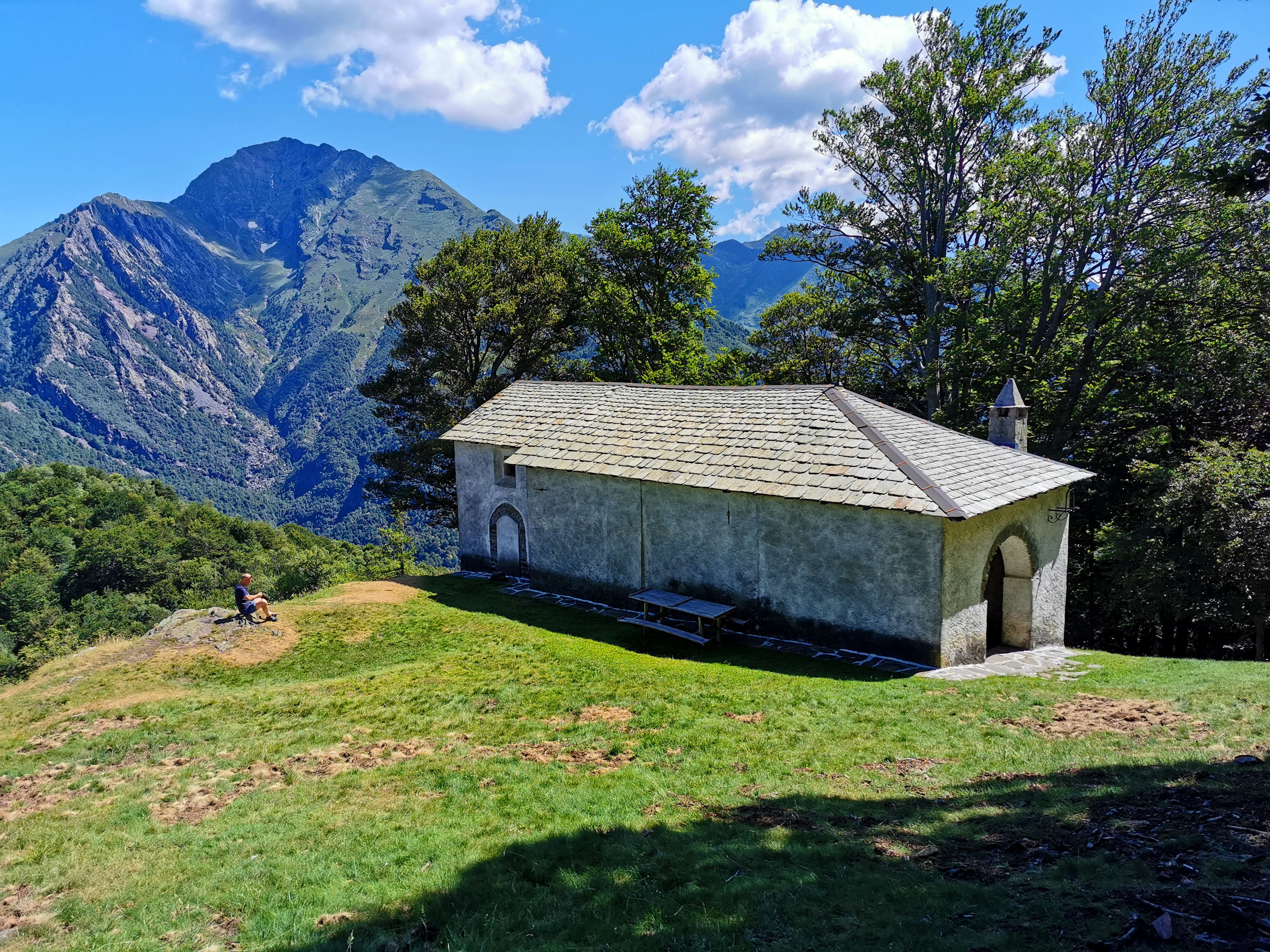
Alpe Giumello: little church of Sant'Ulderico
