= Giuseppe Fanfani =

Italian politician and lawyer

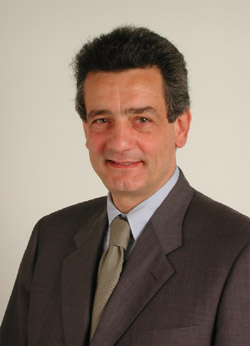

Mayor of Arezzo
- In office 30 May 2006 – 16 September 2014
- Preceded by: Luigi Lucherini
- Succeeded by: Alessandro Ghinelli

Member of the Chamber of Deputies
- In office 30 May 2001 – 27 April 2006
- Constituency: Arezzo

Personal details
- Born: 19 April 1947 (age 79) Sansepolcro, Tuscany, Italy
- Party: DC (until 1994); PPI (1994-2002); The Daisy (2002-2007); PD (since 2007)
- Education: University of Perugia
- Profession: Lawyer

Giuseppe Fanfani (born 19 April 1947 in Sansepolcro) is an Italian politician and lawyer.

Giuseppe is Amintore Fanfani's nephew. He joined the Italian People's Party after the dissolution of the Christian Democracy in 1994. Fanfani was elected at the 2001 Italian general election, serving as member of the Chamber of Deputies for the XIV Legislature. He joined the Democratic Party in 2007.

Fanfani was elected Mayor of Arezzo on 30 May 2006 and re-elected for a second term on 19 May 2011. He resigned in September 2014 after his election at the High Council of the Judiciary.

== See also ==
- 2001 Italian general election
- 2006 Italian local elections
- 2011 Italian local elections
- List of mayors of Arezzo

Political offices
Preceded by Luigi Lucherini	Mayor of Arezzo; 2006–2014	Succeeded by Alessandro Ghinelli
