= Taceno =

Taceno Taséen (Lombard)
- Comune
- Comune di Taceno
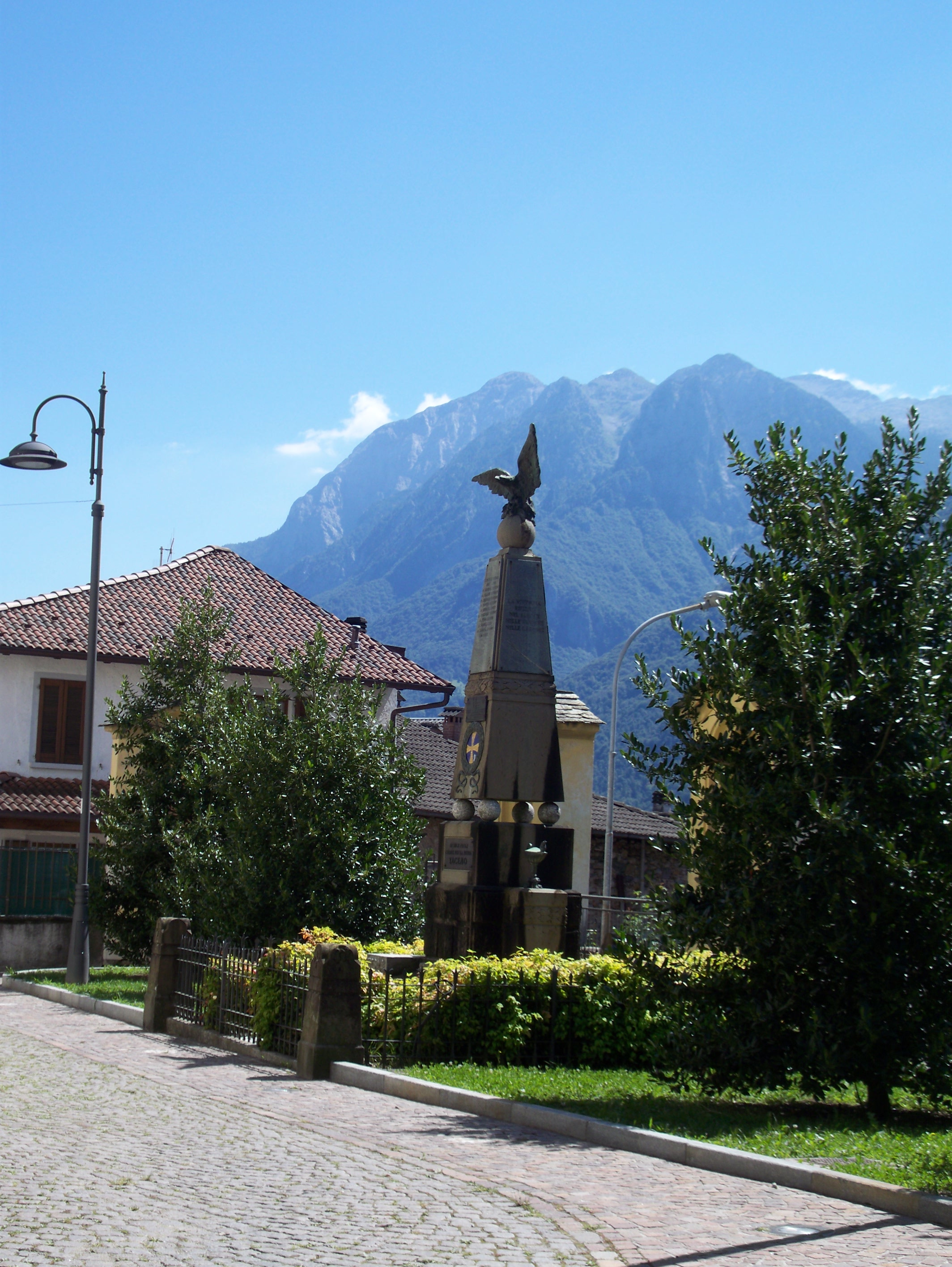
- Taceno

- Location within Italy Location within Lombardy
- Coordinates: 46°1′N 9°22′E
- Country: Italy
- Region: Lombardy
- Province: Lecco (LC)

Government
  - Mayor: Alberto Nogara (Ind.)

Area
  - Total: 3.7 km^{2} (1.4 sq mi)
- Elevation: 507 m (1,663 ft)

Population (1 January 2014)
  - Total: 554
  - Density: 150/km^{2} (390/sq mi)
- Demonym: Tacenesi
- Time zone: UTC+1 (CET)
  - Summer (DST): UTC+2 (CEST)
- Postal code: 22040
- Dialing code: 0341
- Patron saint: S. Maria Assunta
- Saint day: 15 August
- Website: Official website

Taceno (Valsassinese: Taséen) is a comune (municipality) in the Province of Lecco in the Italian region Lombardy, located about 60 kilometres (37 miles) north of Milan and about 20 kilometres (12 miles) north of Lecco.

Taceno borders the following municipalities: Casargo, Cortenova, Crandola Valsassina, Esino Lario, Margno, Parlasco, Vendrogno.
