= Andrea Vitali =

Italian writer (born 1956)

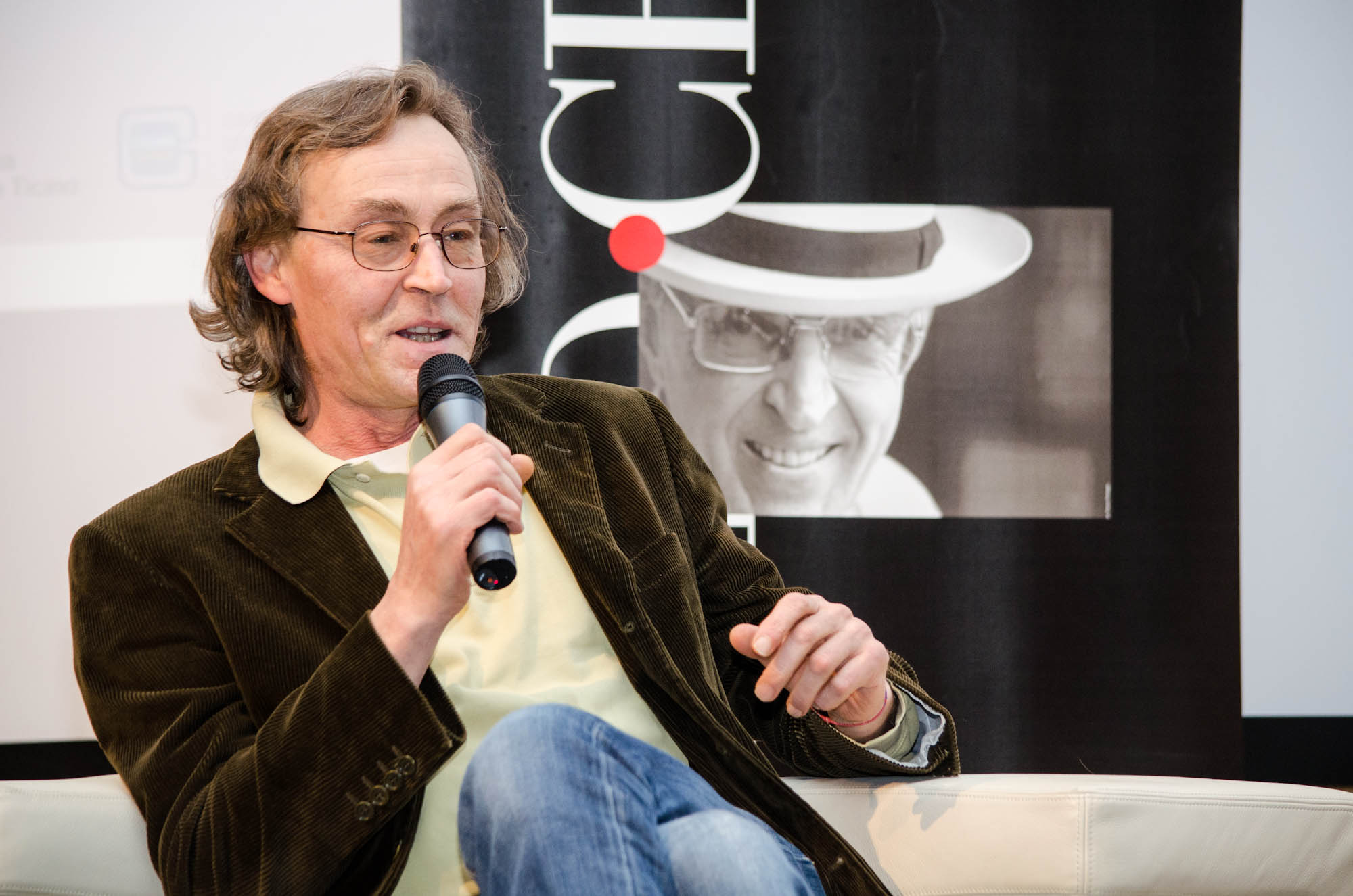
Andrea Vitali.

Andrea Vitali (born 5 February 1956) is an Italian writer.

== Biography ==
Vitali was born in Bellano, on the eastern shore of Lake Como. After graduating from medical college, he worked as an MD until 2014.

He debuted as a writer in 1990, with the novella Il procuratore, which won the "Montblanc Award for Young Novel". In 1995 he won the "Piero Chiara Literary Award" for L'ombra di Marinetti, and, in 2003, with Una finestra vistalago, he won the Grinzane Cavour Prize. Vitali has written many more novels and novellas, some of which have gone on to win several further literary awards.

His books have been translated in more than 10 languages.
