= Valdo Vannucci =

Italian politician and professor

Member of the Provincial Council of Arezzo
- In office 18 July 1985 – 21 March 1990

Mayor of Arezzo
- In office 28 June 1990 – 8 May 1995
- Preceded by: Aldo Ducci
- Succeeded by: Paolo Ricci

Personal details
- Born: May 4, 1947 (age 78) Bibbiena, Italy
- Party: Italian Socialist Party

Valdo Vannucci (born 4 May 1947) is an Italian politician and professor.

He was a member of the Italian Socialist Party and was elected councillor of the Province of Arezzo in 1985. He served as Mayor of Arezzo from 1990 to 1995 and also served several times as city councillor in Bibbiena.

== Biography ==
Valdo Vannucci was born in Bibbiena, Italy in 1947. He was appointed president of the Casentino mountain community.

== See also ==
- List of mayors of Arezzo

Political offices
Preceded by Aldo Ducci	Mayor of Arezzo; 28 June 1990—8 May 1995	Succeeded by Paolo Ricci
