= Pianello del Lario =

- Comune
- Comune di Pianello del Lario
- Location within Italy Location within Lombardy
- Coordinates: 46°6′N 9°17′E
- Country: Italy
- Region: Lombardy
- Province: Como (CO)
- Frazioni: Bellera, Belmonte, Calozzo, Camlago, Crotti, Garuso, Maggiana, Mianico, Nasina, Riva, Saliana, Sant'Anna, Tre Terre

Government
  - Mayor: Bruno Pedrazzani

Area
  - Total: 9.8 km^{2} (3.8 sq mi)
- Elevation: 200 m (660 ft)

Population (31 December 2010)
  - Total: 1,050
  - Density: 110/km^{2} (280/sq mi)
- Demonym: Pianellesi
- Time zone: UTC+1 (CET)
  - Summer (DST): UTC+2 (CEST)
- Postal code: 22010
- Dialing code: 0344

Pianello del Lario (Comasco: Pianell [pjaˈnɛl]) is a comune (municipality) in the Province of Como in the Italian region Lombardy, located about 70 kilometres (43 mi) north of Milan and about 35 kilometres (22 mi) northeast of Como.

Pianello del Lario borders the following municipalities: Colico, Cremia, Dervio, Dongo, Dorio, Garzeno, Musso.

== Population ==
As of census 2023, Pianello del Lario has a population of 1,063. Male population is 522 and female population 541.
