= Cremia =

Cremia Crèmie (Lombard)
- Comune
- Comune di Cremia
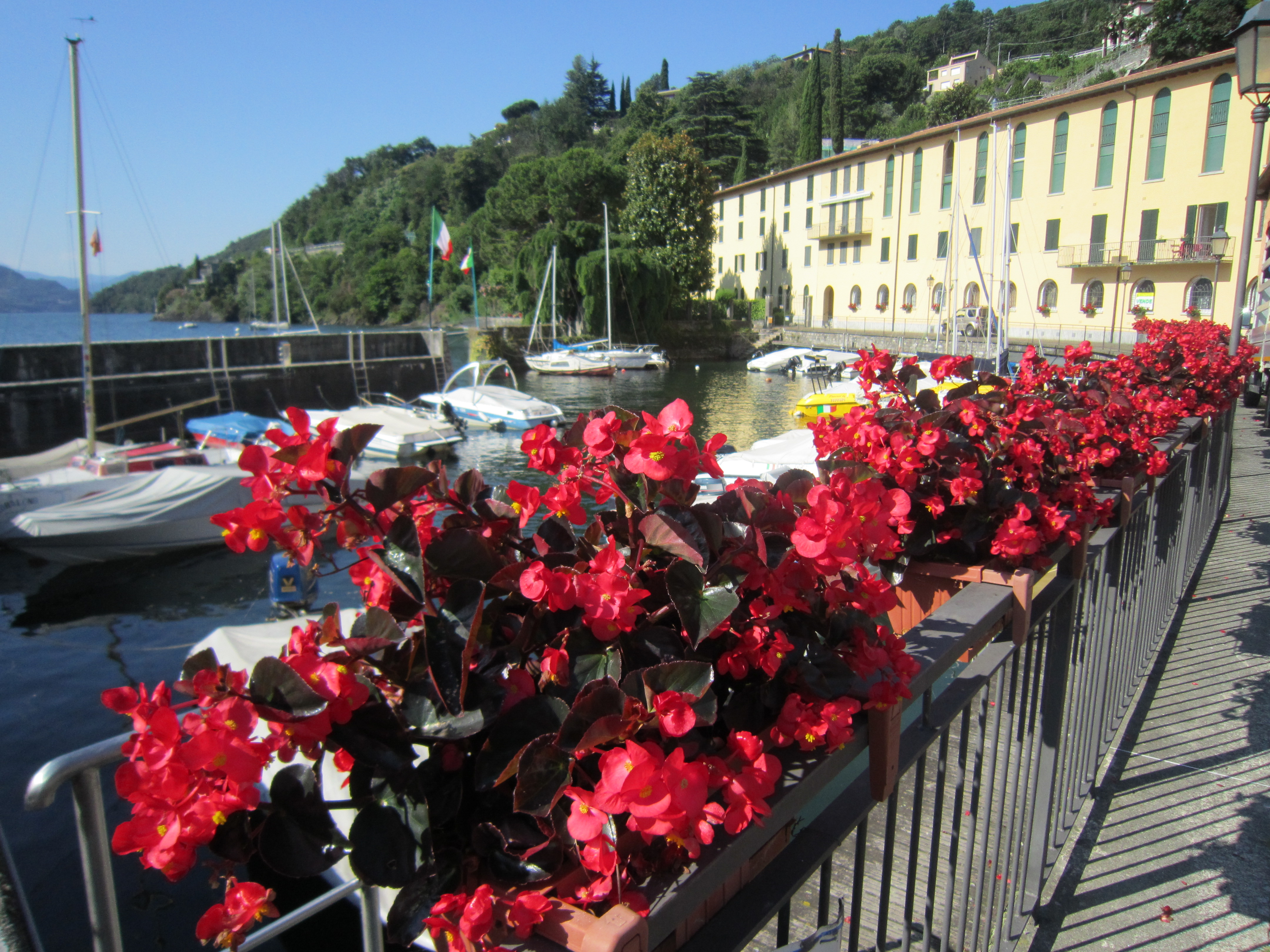

- Location within Italy Location within Lombardy
- Coordinates: 46°5′N 9°17′E
- Country: Italy
- Region: Lombardy
- Province: Como (CO)
- Frazioni: Cadreglio, Cantone, Cheis, Colceno, Ghiano, Lago di Como, Marnino, Motto, Prato, Pusgnano, Raviscedo, Samaino, San Vito, Semurano, Somano, Vezzedo, Vignola

Government
  - Mayor: Guido Dell'Era

Area
  - Total: 10.14 km^{2} (3.92 sq mi)
- Elevation: 330 m (1,080 ft)

Population (31 March 2017)
  - Total: 694
  - Density: 68.4/km^{2} (177/sq mi)
- Demonym: Cremiesi
- Time zone: UTC+1 (CET)
  - Summer (DST): UTC+2 (CEST)
- Postal code: 22010
- Dialing code: 0344
- Website: Official website

Cremia (Lombard: Crèmie [ˈkrɛmje]) is a comune (municipality) in the Province of Como in the Italian region Lombardy, located about 70 kilometres (43 mi) north of Milan and about 35 kilometres (22 mi) northeast of Como, on the western shore of Lake Como.

Cremia borders the following municipalities: Dervio, Garzeno, Pianello del Lario, Plesio, San Siro.
