= Margno =

Margno Margn (Lombard)
- Comune
- Comune di Margno
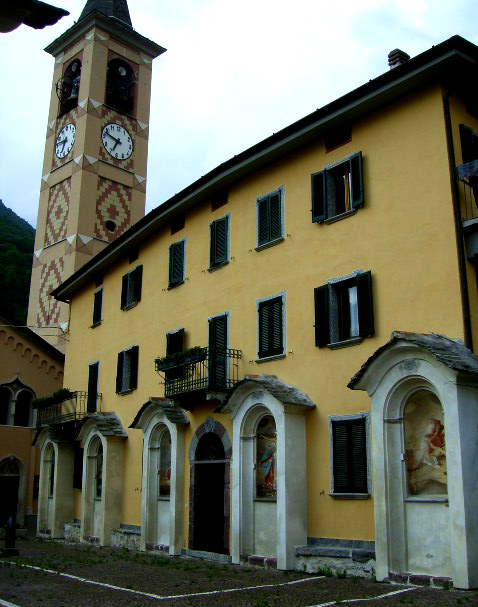
- Parish church of St. Bartholomew.

- Location within Italy Location within Lombardy
- Coordinates: 46°2′N 9°23′E
- Country: Italy
- Region: Lombardy
- Province: Lecco (LC)
- Frazioni: Le Betulle

Government
  - Mayor: Giuseppe Malugani

Area
  - Total: 3.7 km^{2} (1.4 sq mi)
- Elevation: 730 m (2,400 ft)

Population (31 December 2010)
  - Total: 366
  - Density: 99/km^{2} (260/sq mi)
- Demonym: Margnesi
- Time zone: UTC+1 (CET)
  - Summer (DST): UTC+2 (CEST)
- Postal code: 22050
- Dialing code: 0341
- Website: Official website

Margno (Valassinese Lombard: Margn) is a comune (municipality) in the Province of Lecco in the Italian region Lombardy, located about 70 kilometres (43 mi) north of Milan and about 20 kilometres (12 mi) north of Lecco.

Margno borders the following municipalities: Casargo, Crandola Valsassina, Taceno.
