= Monte Croce di Muggio =

Mountain in Italy

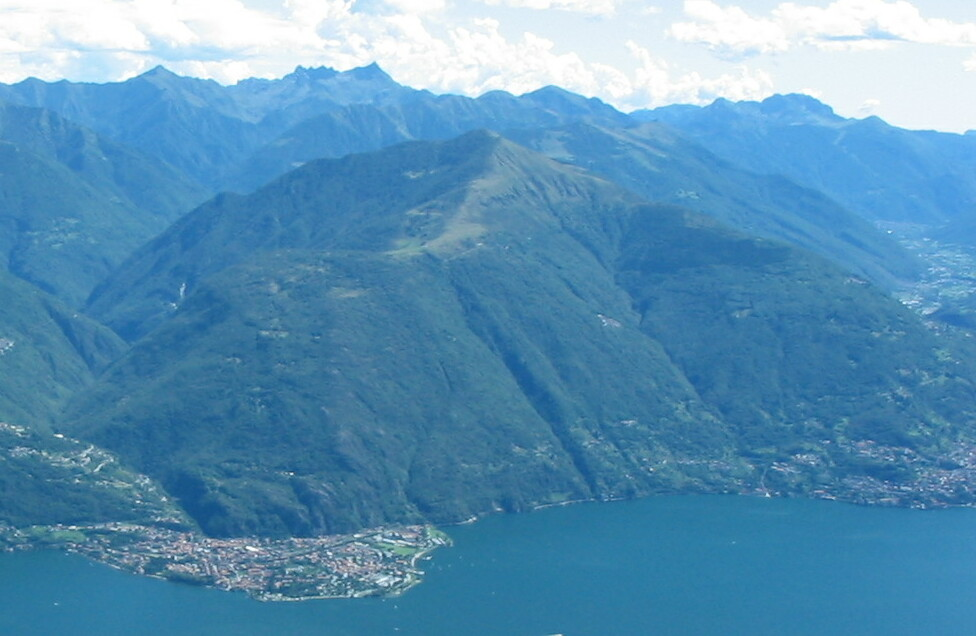
- Monte Croce di Muggio, view from Monte Bregagno.

Highest point
- Elevation: 1,799 m (5,902 ft)
- Prominence: 867 m (2,844 ft)
- Isolation: 4.67 km (2.90 mi)
- Coordinates: 46°3′3″N 9°21′25″E

Geography
- Location within Italy
- Location: Lombardy, near Lake Como, Italy

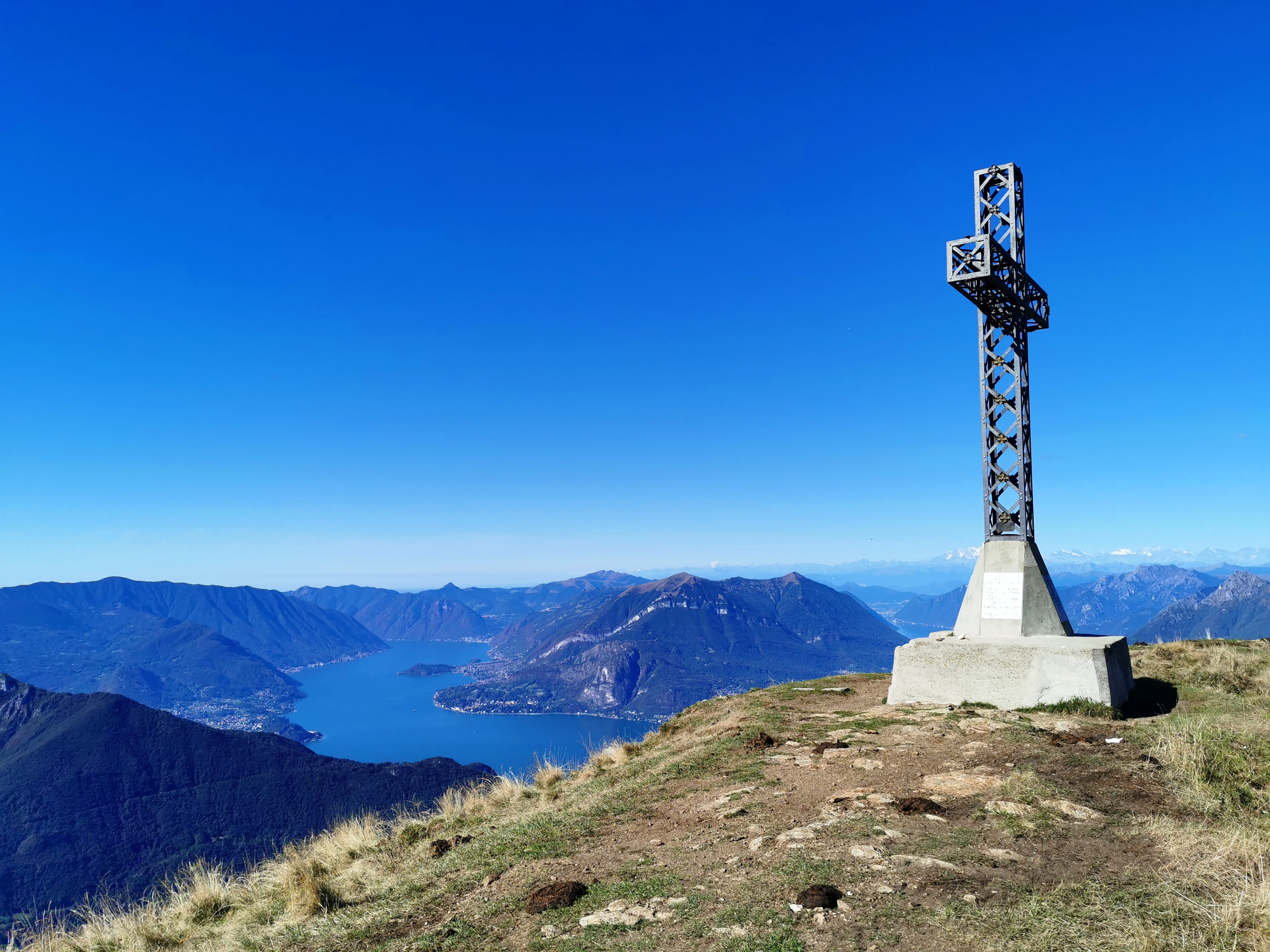
Lake Como, seen from Monte Croce di Muggio

Monte Croce di Muggio is a mountain in Lombardy in Italy with an elevation of 1,799 m (5,902 ft). It is located near Lake Como, close to the city of Bellano.
