= Plesio =

Plesio Pies (Lombard)
- Comune
- Comune di Plesio
- Location within Italy Location within Lombardy
- Coordinates: 46°3′N 9°14′E
- Country: Italy
- Region: Lombardy
- Province: Province of Como (CO)

Area
  - Total: 17.0 km^{2} (6.6 sq mi)

Population (Dec. 2004)
  - Total: 833
  - Density: 49.0/km^{2} (127/sq mi)
- Time zone: UTC+1 (CET)
  - Summer (DST): UTC+2 (CEST)
- Postal code: 22010
- Dialing code: 0344

Plesio (Comasco: Pies [ˈpjeːs]) is a comune (municipality) in the Province of Como in the Italian region Lombardy, located about 70 kilometres (43 mi) north of Milan and about 30 kilometres (19 mi) northeast of Como. As of 31 December 2004, it had a population of 833 and an area of 17.0 square kilometres (6.6 mi^{2}).

Plesio borders the following municipalities: Cremia, Garzeno, Grandola ed Uniti, Menaggio, San Siro.

== Demographic evolution ==
Historical population

Year	Pop.	±%
1861	1,235	—
1871	1,179	−4.5%
1881	1,164	−1.3%
1901	1,153	−0.9%
1911	1,179	+2.3%

Year	Pop.	±%
1921	1,127	−4.4%
1931	993	−11.9%
1936	892	−10.2%
1951	809	−9.3%
1961	786	−2.8%

Year	Pop.	±%
1971	792	+0.8%
1981	825	+4.2%
1991	799	−3.2%
2001	805	+0.8%

Source: Data from ISTAT
