= Piantedo =

Piantedo Pianté (Lombard)
- Comune
- Comune di Piantedo
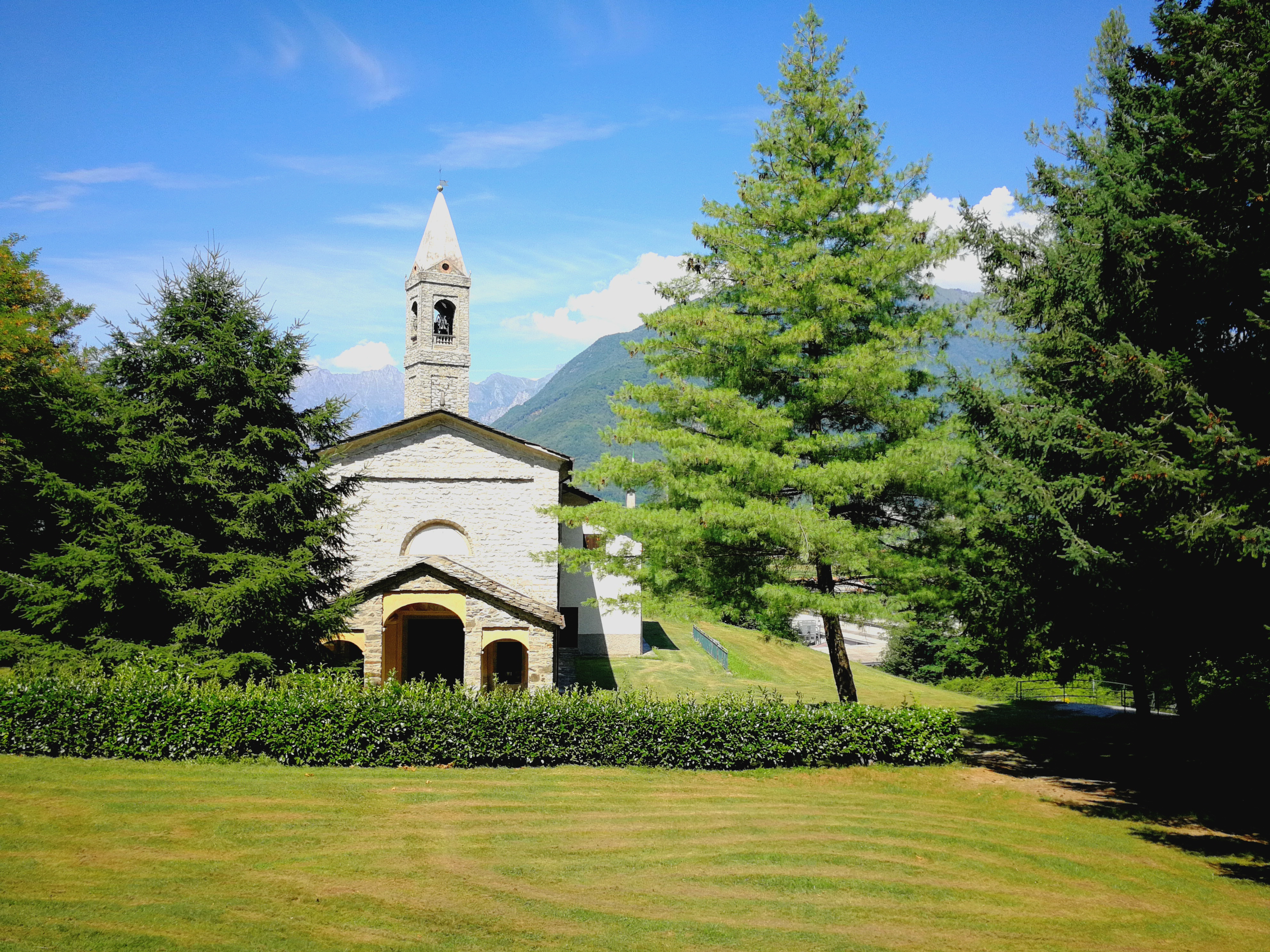
- Church in Piantedo

- Location within Italy Location within Lombardy
- Coordinates: 46°8′N 9°25′E
- Country: Italy
- Region: Lombardy
- Province: Province of Sondrio (SO)

Area
  - Total: 6.7 km^{2} (2.6 sq mi)

Population (Dec. 2004)
  - Total: 1,258
  - Density: 190/km^{2} (490/sq mi)
- Time zone: UTC+1 (CET)
  - Summer (DST): UTC+2 (CEST)
- Postal code: 23010
- Dialing code: 0342

Piantedo (Lombard: Pianté) is a comune (municipality) in the Province of Sondrio in the Italian region of Lombardy, located about 80 km (50 mi) north of Milan and about 35 km (22 mi) west of Sondrio. As of 31 December 2004, it had a population of 1,258 and an area of 6.7 km^{2} (2.6 sq mi).

Piantedo borders the following municipalities: Colico, Delebio, Dubino, Gera Lario, Pagnona.
