= Pagnona =

Pagnona Pagnone (Lombard)
- Comune
- Comune di Pagnona
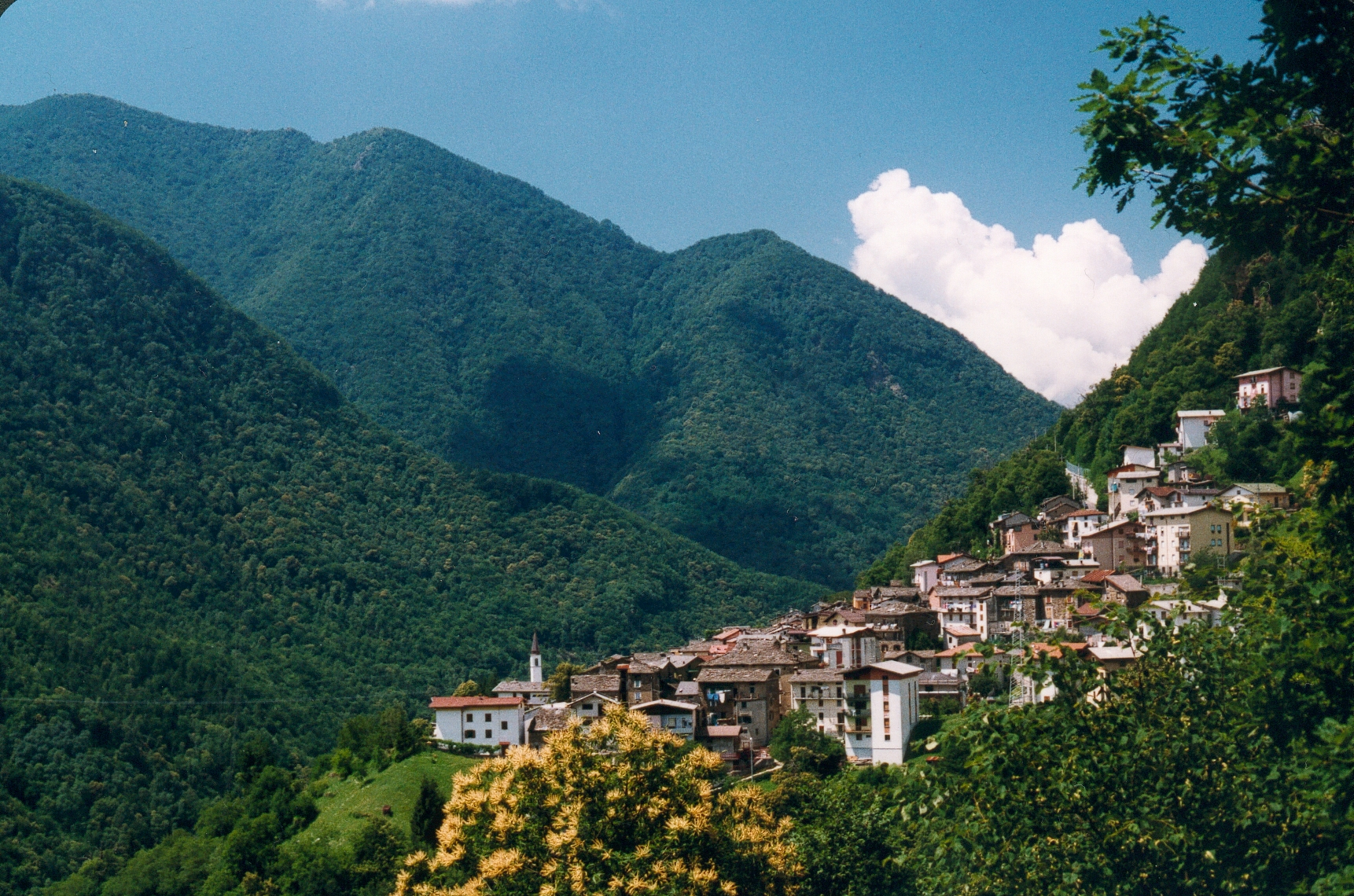

- Location within Italy Location within Lombardy
- Coordinates: 46°4′N 9°24′E
- Country: Italy
- Region: Lombardy
- Province: Lecco (LC)

Government
  - Mayor: Maria Cristina Coppo

Area
  - Total: 9.2 km^{2} (3.6 sq mi)
- Elevation: 790 m (2,590 ft)

Population (31 December 2017)
  - Total: 434
  - Density: 47/km^{2} (120/sq mi)
- Demonym: Pagnonesi
- Time zone: UTC+1 (CET)
  - Summer (DST): UTC+2 (CEST)
- Postal code: 22050
- Dialing code: 0341
- Website: Official website

Pagnona (Valvarronese: Pagnone) is a comune (municipality) in the Province of Lecco in the Italian region Lombardy, located about 70 kilometres (43 mi) northeast of Milan and about 25 kilometres (16 mi) north of Lecco.

Pagnona borders the following municipalities: Casargo, Colico, Delebio, Piantedo, Premana, Tremenico.
