= Angelo Guillichini =

Italian politician (1825–1893)

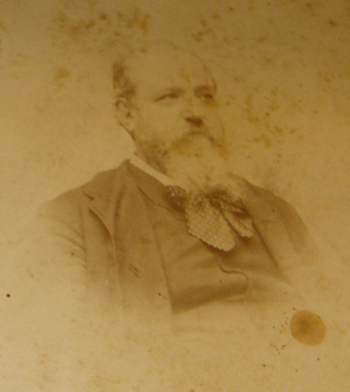

Member of the Chamber of Deputies
- In office 1882–1886

Mayor of Arezzo
- In office 29 July 1878 – 16 April 1879
- Preceded by: Angiolo Mascagni
- Succeeded by: Adalindo Tanganelli

Personal details
- Born: Angiolo Guillichini; 11 February 1825 Arezzo, Grand Duchy of Tuscany
- Died: 23 November 1893 (aged 68) Arezzo, Kingdom of Italy
- Education: University of Pisa
- Occupation: Landowner

Angelo Guillichini (11 February 1825 – 23 November 1893) was an Italian politician who served as mayor of Arezzo and as a deputy in the Chamber of Deputies of the Kingdom of Italy.

== Life and career ==
Born in Arezzo, Guillichini graduated in mathematics from the University of Pisa and participated in the Italian unification wars. He later held several civic and administrative positions in his hometown, including leadership roles in local institutions and charitable organizations.

In 1878 he was appointed mayor of Arezzo, a position he held until 1879. He was elected to the Italian Chamber of Deputies for the 15th legislature in 1882, representing the constituency of Arezzo.
