= Pier Ludovico Occhini =

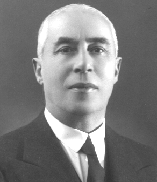

Senator of the Kingdom of Italy
- In office 27 April 1934 – 28 March 1941
- Monarch: Victor Emmanuel III

Podestà of Arezzo
- In office 22 May 1930 – July 1939
- Preceded by: Guido Guidotti Mori
- Succeeded by: Varrone Ducci

Mayor of Arezzo
- In office 26 April 1909 – 6 July 1909
- Preceded by: Antonio Guiducci
- Succeeded by: Ugo Mancini

Personal details
- Born: 30 January 1874 Arezzo, Kingdom of Italy
- Died: 28 March 1941 (aged 67) Arezzo, Kingdom of Italy
- Party: National Fascist Party
- Occupation: Journalist, writer

Pier Ludovico Occhini (30 January 1874 – 28 March 1941) was an Italian journalist, writer, art critic, and politician. He served as mayor and later podestà of Arezzo, and was appointed senator of the Kingdom of Italy in 1934 during the Fascist period.
