= Enrico Grazi =

Italian politician

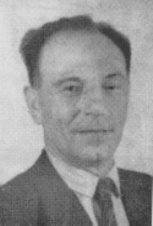

Member of the Senate of the Republic
- In office 25 June 1953 – 30 September 1953

Member of the Constituent Assembly of Italy
- In office 1946–1948

Mayor of Arezzo
- In office 21 March 1946 – 21 February 1948
- Preceded by: Antonio Curina
- Succeeded by: Santi Galimberti

Personal details
- Born: 19 May 1897 Sinalunga, Province of Siena, Kingdom of Italy
- Died: 30 September 1953 (aged 56) Rome, Italy
- Party: Italian Socialist Party
- Occupation: Engineer

Enrico Grazi (19 May 1897 – 30 September 1953) was an Italian engineer and politician who served as mayor of Arezzo (1946–1948), a member of the Constituent Assembly of Italy (1946–1948), and a senator of the Italian Republic in the II Legislature.
