= Sueglio =

Sueglio Süéi (Lombard)
- Comune
- Comune di Sueglio
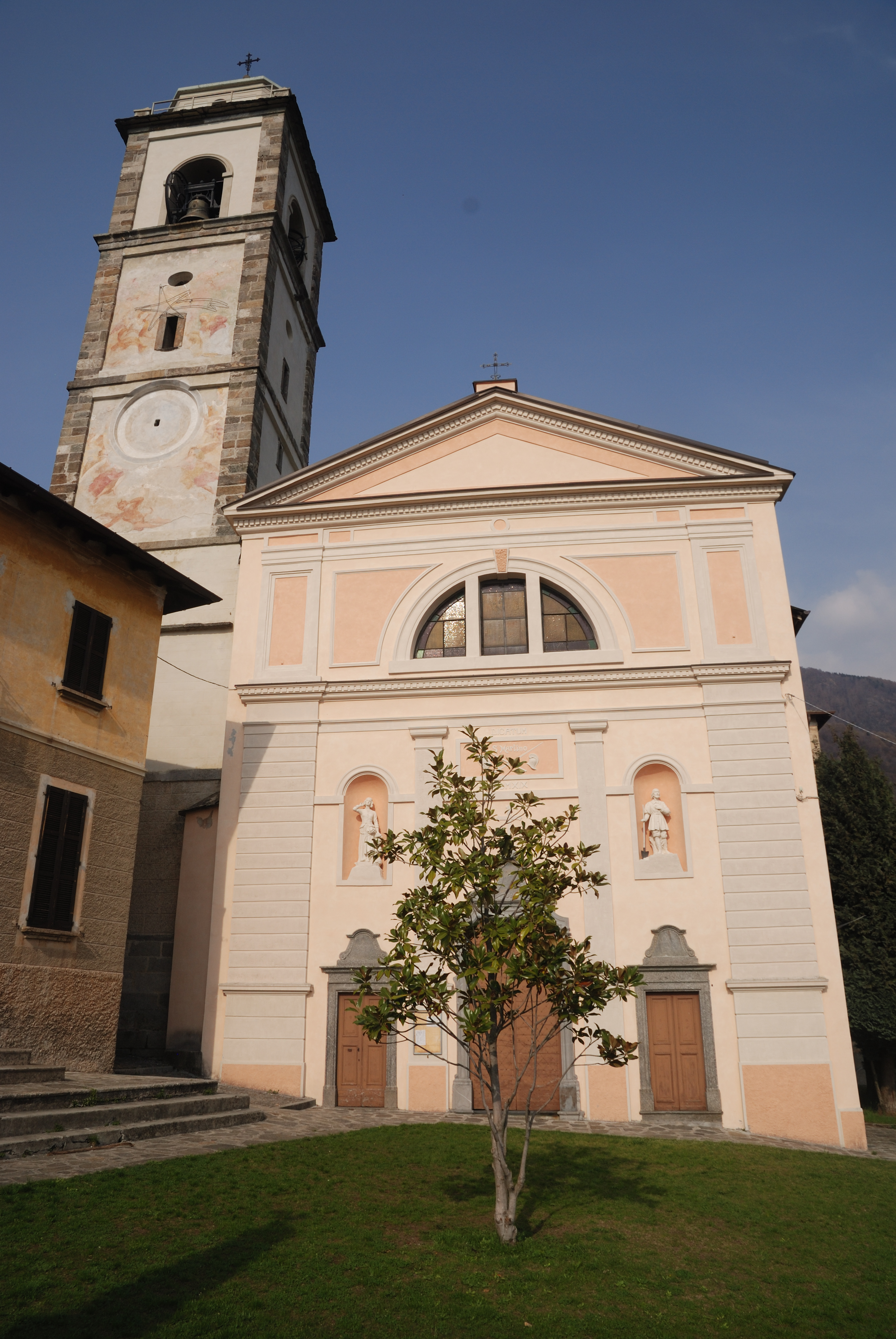
- Parish church of St. Martin

- Location within Italy Location within Lombardy
- Coordinates: 46°5′N 9°20′E
- Country: Italy
- Region: Lombardy
- Province: Lecco (LC)

Government
  - Mayor: Pierpaolo Tabuli

Area
  - Total: 4.2 km^{2} (1.6 sq mi)
- Elevation: 775 m (2,543 ft)

Population (30 November 2014)
  - Total: 144
  - Density: 34/km^{2} (89/sq mi)
- Demonym: Suegliesi
- Time zone: UTC+1 (CET)
  - Summer (DST): UTC+2 (CEST)
- Postal code: 22050
- Dialing code: 0341
- Website: Official website

Sueglio (Valvarronese: Süéi) is a comune (municipality) in the Province of Lecco in the Italian region Lombardy, located about 70 kilometres (43 mi) north of Milan and about 25 kilometres (16 mi) north of Lecco.

Sueglio borders the following municipalities: Dervio, Dorio, Introzzo, Vestreno.
