= Crandola Valsassina =

- Comune
- Comune di Crandola Valsassina
- Coat of arms

- Location of Crandola Valsassina in Italy Crandola Valsassina (Lombardy)
- Coordinates: 46°1′N 9°23′E
- Country: Italy
- Region: Lombardy
- Province: Province of Lecco (LC)

Area
  - Total: 9.1 km^{2} (3.5 sq mi)
- Elevation: 780 m (2,560 ft)

Population (1 January 2014)
  - Total: 259
  - Density: 28/km^{2} (74/sq mi)
- Demonym: Crandolesi
- Time zone: UTC+1 (CET)
  - Summer (DST): UTC+2 (CEST)
- Postal code: 22050
- Dialing code: 0341
- Website: Official website

Crandola Valsassina (Valassinese Lombard: Cràndola) is a comune (municipality) in the Province of Lecco in the Italian region Lombardy, located about 60 kilometres (37 mi) northeast of Milan and about 20 kilometres (12 mi) north of Lecco.

Crandola Valsassina borders the following municipalities: Casargo, Cortenova, Margno, Primaluna, Taceno.
