= Vendrogno =

Vendrogno Vendrògn (Lombard)
- Frazione
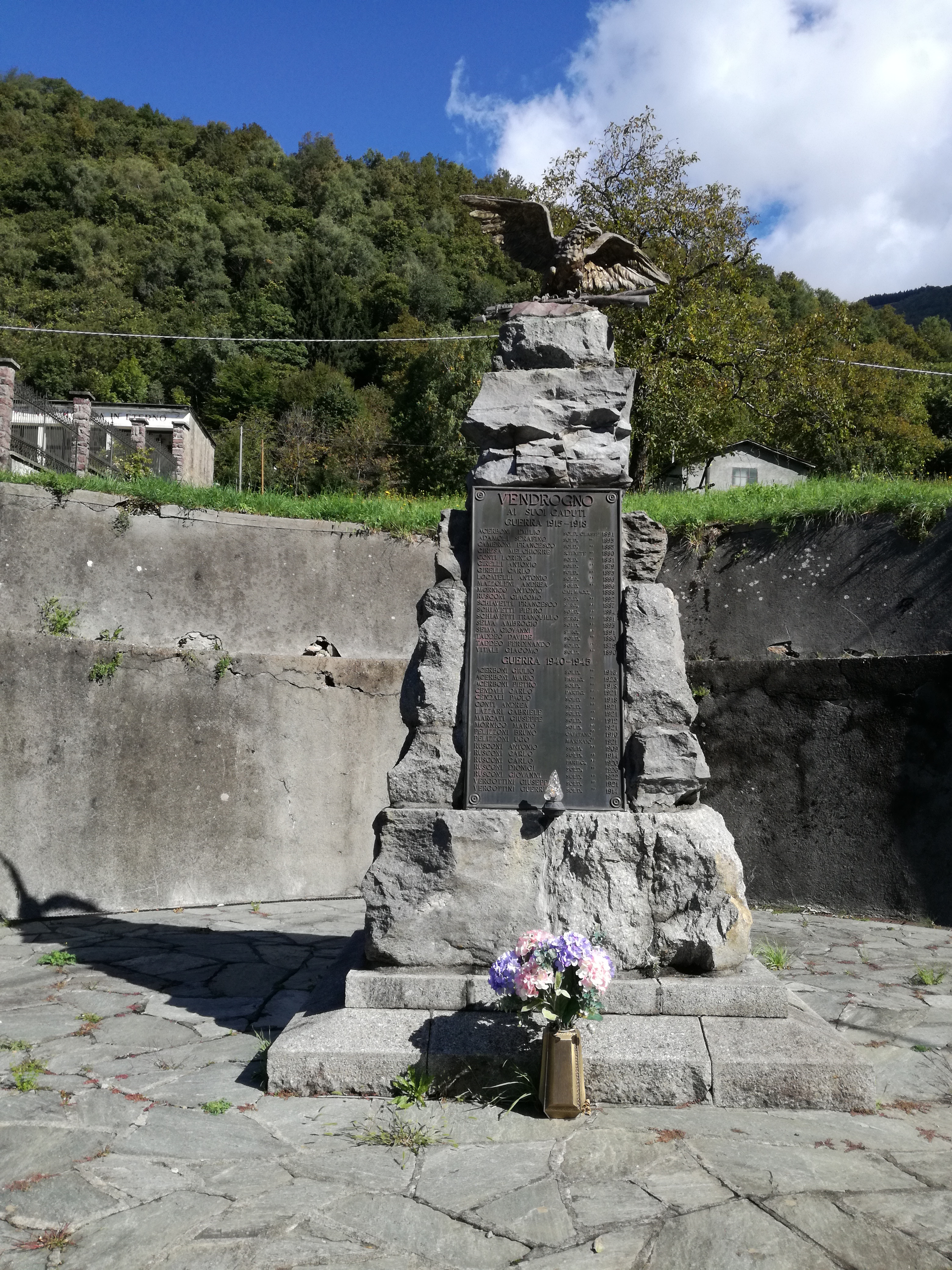

- Location of Vendrogno in Italy
- Coordinates: 46°2′N 9°20′E
- Country: Italy
- Region: Lombardy
- Province: Lecco (LC)
- Comune: Bellano

Area
  - Total: 11.7 km^{2} (4.5 sq mi)
- Elevation: 731 m (2,398 ft)

Population (31 December 2010)
  - Total: 317
  - Density: 27.1/km^{2} (70.2/sq mi)
- Demonym: Vendrognesi
- Time zone: UTC+1 (CET)
  - Summer (DST): UTC+2 (CEST)
- Postal code: 23838
- Dialing code: 0341
- Website: Official website

Vendrogno (Valvarronese: Vendrògn) was a comune (municipality) in the Province of Lecco in the Italian region Lombardy, located about 60 kilometres (37 mi) north of Milan and about 20 kilometres (12 mi) north of Lecco; part of Bellano since the 1° january 2020.

The location is accessible from the main valley Valsassina, 4 km from the municipality of Taceno, and the Lake Como, which is 8 km distant by the municipality of Bellano.

Vendrogno used to border the following municipalities: Bellano, Casargo, Dervio, Parlasco, Taceno, Tremenico.

San Lorenzo is the name of the church in the center of Vendrogno. There are several other churches located in Vendrogno.

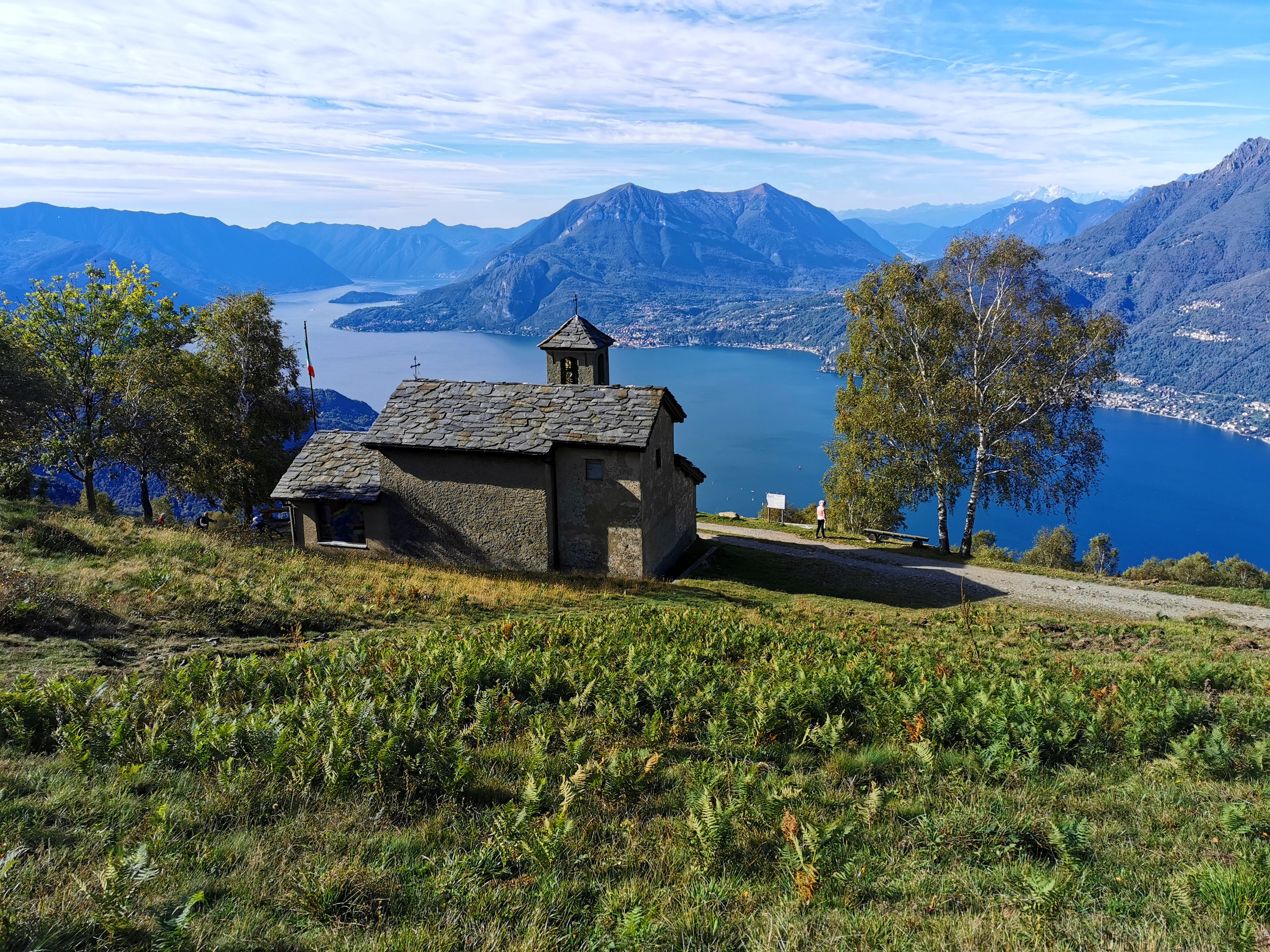
Vendrogno: Lake Como, seen from Alpe Camaggiore
