= Varrone =

Varrone is both a given name and a surname. Notable people with the name include:

- Varrone Ducci (1898–1945), Italian politician
- Nicolás Varrone (born 2000), Argentine racing driver
- Sabrina Varrone (born 1972), Italian runner
