= List of mayors of Arezzo =

Mayor of Arezzo
- Sindaco di Arezzo
- Incumbent; Marcello Comanducci since 11 June 2026
- Appointer: Popular election
- Term length: 5 years, renewable once
- Inaugural holder: Pietro Mori
- Formation: 1865
- Website: Official website

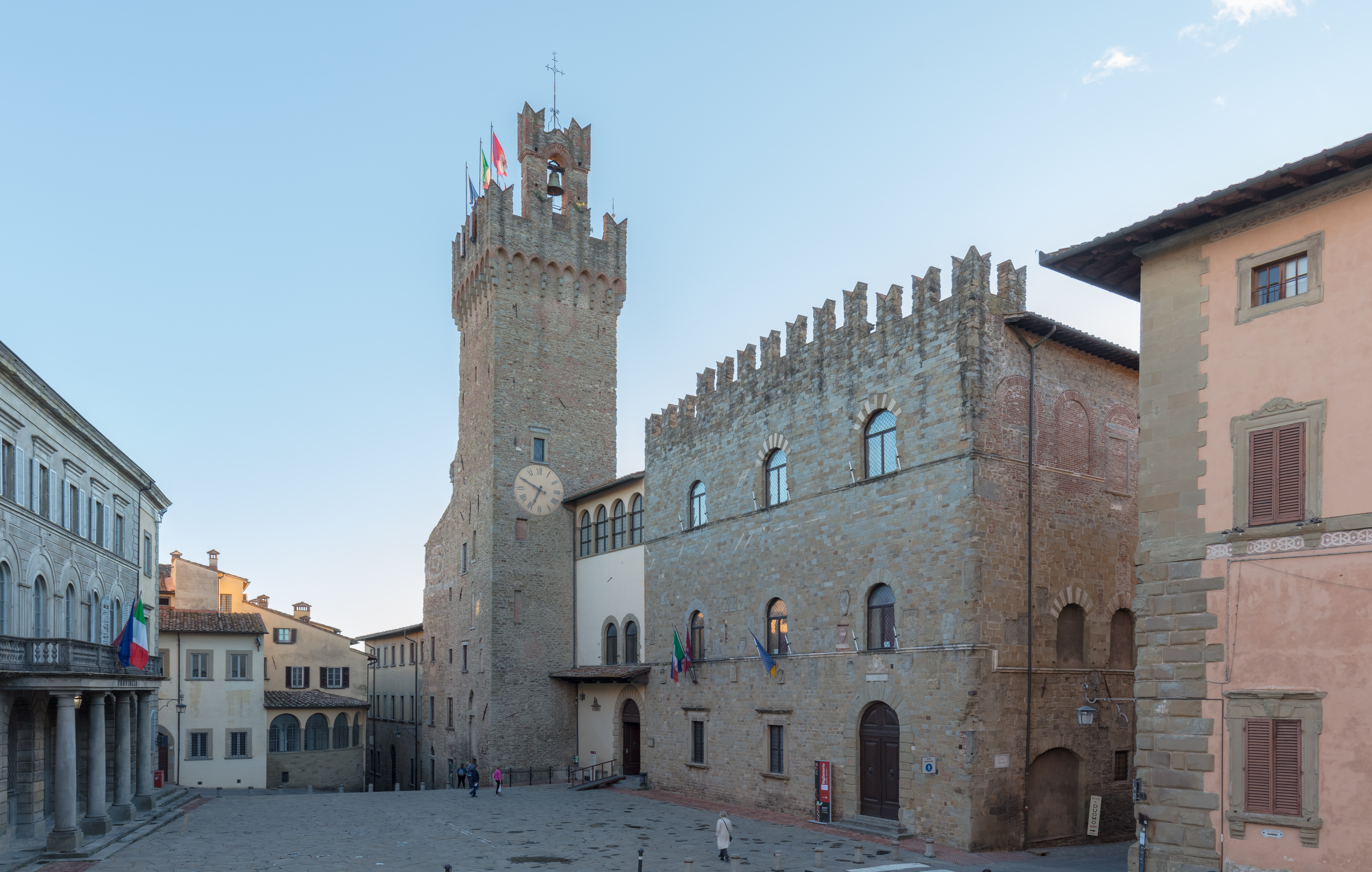
Arezzo's City Hall.

The mayor of Arezzo is an elected politician who, along with the Arezzo City Council, is accountable for the strategic government of Arezzo in Tuscany, Italy.

The current mayor is Marcello Comanducci (FdI), who took office on 11 June 2026.

== Overview ==
According to the Italian Constitution, the mayor of Arezzo is member of the City Council.

The mayor is elected by the population of Arezzo, who also elect the members of the City Council, controlling the mayor's policy guidelines and is able to enforce his resignation by a motion of no confidence. The mayor is entitled to appoint and release the members of his government.

Since 1995 the mayor is elected directly by Arezzo's electorate: in all mayoral elections in Italy in cities with a population higher than 15,000 the voters express a direct choice for the mayor or an indirect choice voting for the party of the candidate's coalition. If no candidate receives at least 50% of votes, the top two candidates go to a second round after two weeks. The election of the City Council is based on a direct choice for the candidate with a preference vote: the candidate with the majority of the preferences is elected. The number of the seats for each party is determined proportionally.

== Kingdom of Italy (1861–1946) ==
In 1865, the Kingdom of Italy created the office of Mayor of Arezzo (Sindaco di Arezzo), appointed by the King himself. From 1892 to 1926 the mayor was elected by the city council. In 1926, the Fascist dictatorship abolished mayors and City councils, replacing them with an authoritarian Podestà chosen by the National Fascist Party. The office of mayor was restored in 1944 during the Allied occupation.

	Mayor	Term start	Term end	Party
1	Pietro Mori	16 July 1865	31 December 1870	
2	Adalindo Tanganelli	3 October 1872	5 May 1874	
3	Angiolo Mascagni	22 November 1874	23 September 1877	
4	Angiolo Guillichini	29 July 1878	16 April 1879	
(2)	Adalindo Tanganelli	14 March 1880	14 December 1881	
5	Ettore Nucci	16 April 1882	31 December 1883	
(3)	Angiolo Mascagni	9 September 1885	21 September 1892	
6	Guglielmo Duranti	4 September 1893	11 February 1900	PRI
7	Antonio Guiducci	11 August 1900	26 April 1909	
8	Pier Ludovico Occhini	26 April 1909	6 July 1909	
9	Ugo Mancini	8 February 1911	16 April 1914	
10	Cammillo Lelli	28 July 1914	9 December 1919	Liberal
11	Carlo Nenci	12 November 1920	9 January 1923	Liberal
12	Fiumicello Fiumicelli	19 agosto 1923	8 luglio 1924	PNF
Fascist Podestà (1927–1943)
1	Guido Guidotti Mori	1 January 1927	14 April 1930	PNF
2	Pier Ludovico Occhini	22 May 1930	July 1939	PNF
3	Varrone Ducci	11 November 1939	31 August 1943	PNF
Allied occupation (1944–1946)
13	Antonio Curina	16 July 1944	21 March 1946	PdA

== Italian Republic (since 1946) ==
=== City Council election (1946–1995) ===
From 1946 to 1995, the mayor of Arezzo was elected by the City's council.

	Mayor	Term start	Term end	Party
1	Enrico Grazi	21 March 1946	21 February 1948	PSI
2	Santi Galimberti	21 February 1948	30 June 1951	PSI
3	Ivo Barbini	30 June 1951	21 January 1955	PSI
4	Cornelio Vinay	22 June 1957	1 August 1963	PSI
5	Aldo Ducci	1 August 1963	23 March 1966	PSI
6	Renato Gnocchi	23 March 1966	12 July 1970	PSI
(5)	Aldo Ducci	12 July 1970	28 June 1990	PSI
7	Valdo Vannucci	28 June 1990	8 May 1995	PSI

=== Direct election (since 1995) ===
Since 1995, under provisions of new local administration law, the Mayor of Arezzo is chosen by direct election, originally every four and since 1999 every five years.

	Mayor	Term start	Term end	Party	Coalition	Election
8	Paolo Ricci	8 May 1995	28 June 1999	PPI	PDS • PPI • FdV • PdD	1995
9	Luigi Lucherini	28 June 1999	28 June 2004	FI	FI • AN • CCD	1999
9	Luigi Lucherini	28 June 2004	21 February 2006 (Note: Resigned after a corruption scandal.)	FI	FI • AN • UDC	2004
Special Prefectural Commissioner tenure (21 February 2006 – 30 May 2006)
10	Giuseppe Fanfani	30 May 2006	19 May 2011	PD	DS • DL • PRC	2006
10	Giuseppe Fanfani	19 May 2011	16 September 2014 (Note: Resigned after his election at the High Council of the Judiciary. The deputy mayor Stefano Gasperini (PD) held the office till a new municipal election took place.)	PD	PD • SEL • IdV • FdS	2011
11	Alessandro Ghinelli	16 June 2015	6 October 2020	Ind	FI • LN • FdI	2015
11	Alessandro Ghinelli	6 October 2020 (Note: Election originally scheduled for June 2020 then postponed due to the coronavirus pandemic.)	11 June 2026	Ind	FI • Lega • FdI	2020
12	Marcello Comanducci	11 June 2026 (Note: Election originally scheduled for September 2025 then postponed to May 2026. According to the Italian law, since 2011 local elections can take place each year only between 15 April and 15 June.)	Incumbent	FdI	FI • Lega • FdI	2026

== See also ==
- Timeline of Arezzo

== Bibliography ==
- Luca Berti (1996). "Sindaci, podestà, commissari del Comune di Arezzo dal 1865 ad oggi". Arezzo: Preprint.
