= Dorio, Lombardy =

Dorio Dor (Lombard)
- Comune
- Comune di Dorio
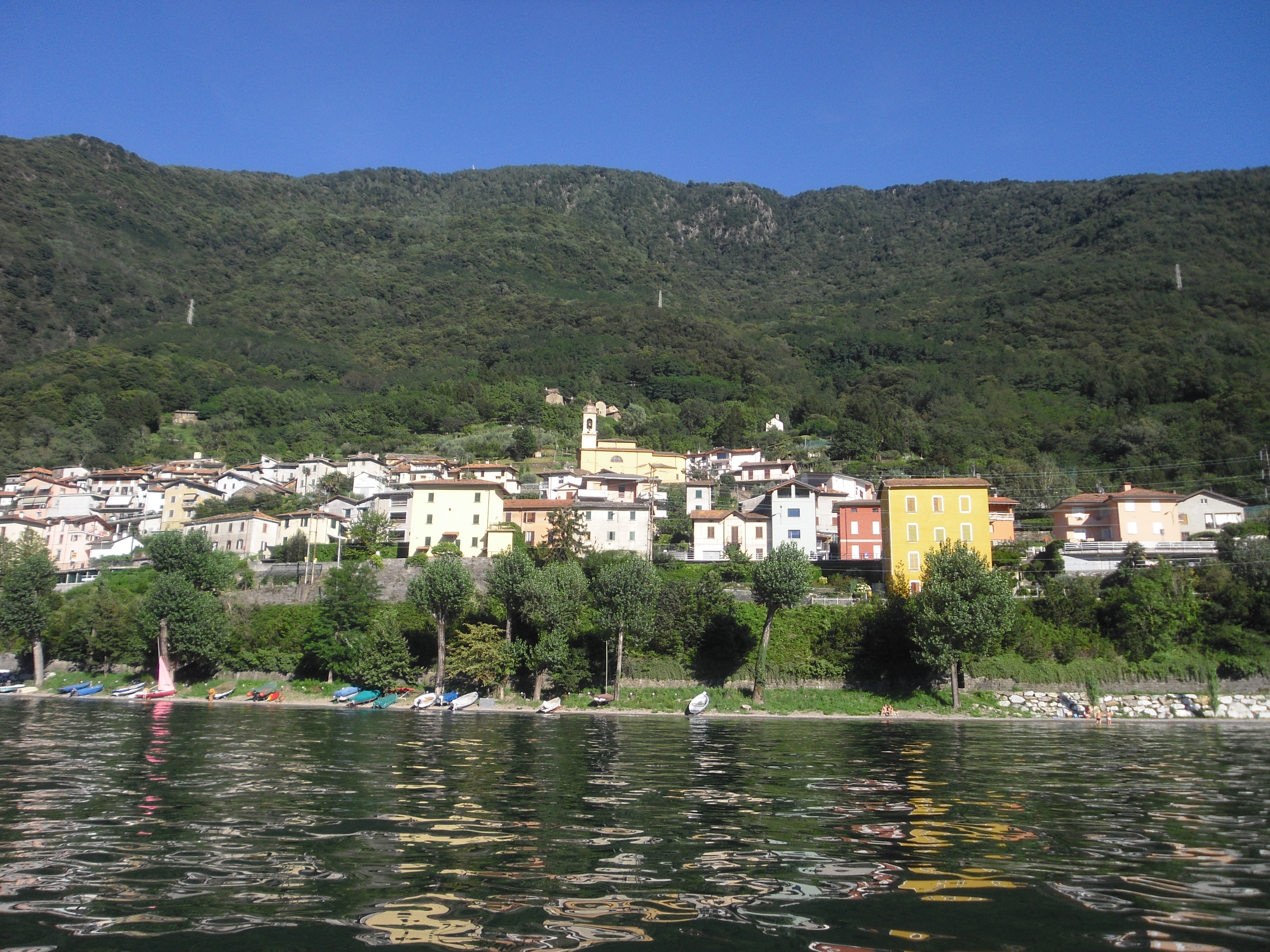
- Dorio seen from the lake

- Location within Italy Location within Lombardy
- Coordinates: 46°6′N 9°19′E
- Country: Italy
- Region: Lombardy
- Province: Lecco (LC)

Government
  - Mayor: Cristina Masanti

Area
  - Total: 11.66 km^{2} (4.50 sq mi)
- Elevation: 210 m (690 ft)

Population (31 July 2017)
  - Total: 318
  - Density: 27.3/km^{2} (70.6/sq mi)
- Demonym: Doriesi
- Time zone: UTC+1 (CET)
  - Summer (DST): UTC+2 (CEST)
- Postal code: 22050
- Dialing code: 0341
- Website: Official website

Dorio (Comasco: Dor [ˈdoːr]) is a comune (municipality) in the Province of Lecco in the Italian region Lombardy, located on the upper eastern shore of Lake of Como, about 70 kilometres (43 mi) north of Milan and about 30 kilometres (19 mi) north of Lecco.

Dorio borders the following municipalities: Colico, Dervio, Introzzo, Pianello del Lario, Sueglio, Tremenico, Vestreno.
