= Antonio Curina =

Italian politician

Mayor of Arezzo
- In office 16 July 1944 – 21 March 1946
- Preceded by: Varrone Ducci (podestà)
- Succeeded by: Enrico Grazi

Personal details
- Born: 11 April 1898 Pietralunga, Italy
- Died: 20 November 1974 (aged 76) Fiesole, Italy
- Party: Action Party
- Occupation: Politician

Antonio Curina (11 April 1898 – 20 November 1974) was an Italian politician.

He was member of the Action Party and served as Mayor of Arezzo from 1944 to 1946.

== Biography ==
Antonio Curina was born in Pietralunga in 1898.

He was the founder and president of the National Liberation Committee of Arezzo in 1943 and was appointed mayor of Arezzo in 1944 by the prefect. He served as municipal councillor in the first legislature of the Arezzo's City Council from 1946 to 1951.

He also served as president of the provincial committee of the National Association of the Italian Partisans.

He died in Fiesole in 1974 at the age of 76.

== See also ==
- List of mayors of Arezzo

Political offices
Preceded by Varrone Ducci (podestà)	Mayor of Arezzo; 16 July 1944—21 March 1946	Succeeded by Enrico Grazi
