= Lake Como Golf Club =

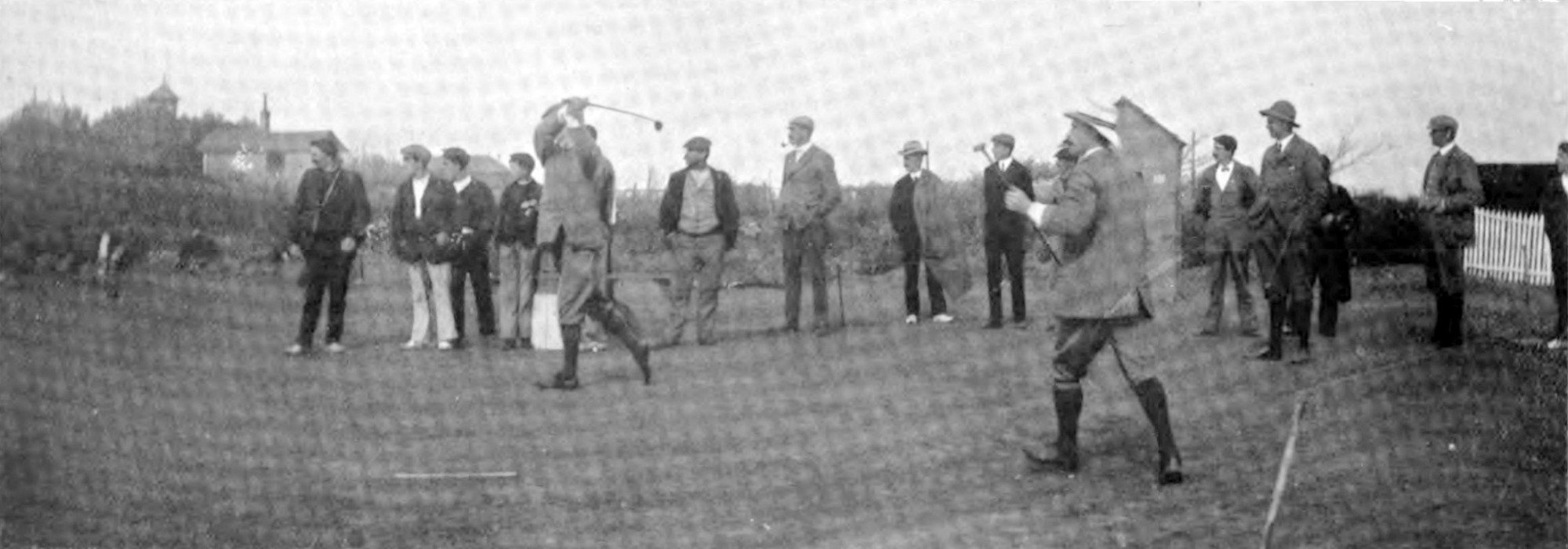
- Driving competition at the opening of the Lake Como Golf Club, Dervio, 1905

- Location within Italy
- 46°04′26″N 9°18′14″E

Club information
- Location: Dervio, Italy
- Established: 1905
- Type: Private
- Owner: Frederick Gustavus Hamilton-Russell
- Total holes: 9
- Designed by: John Henry Taylor
- Length: 2,150 metres (2,350 yd)
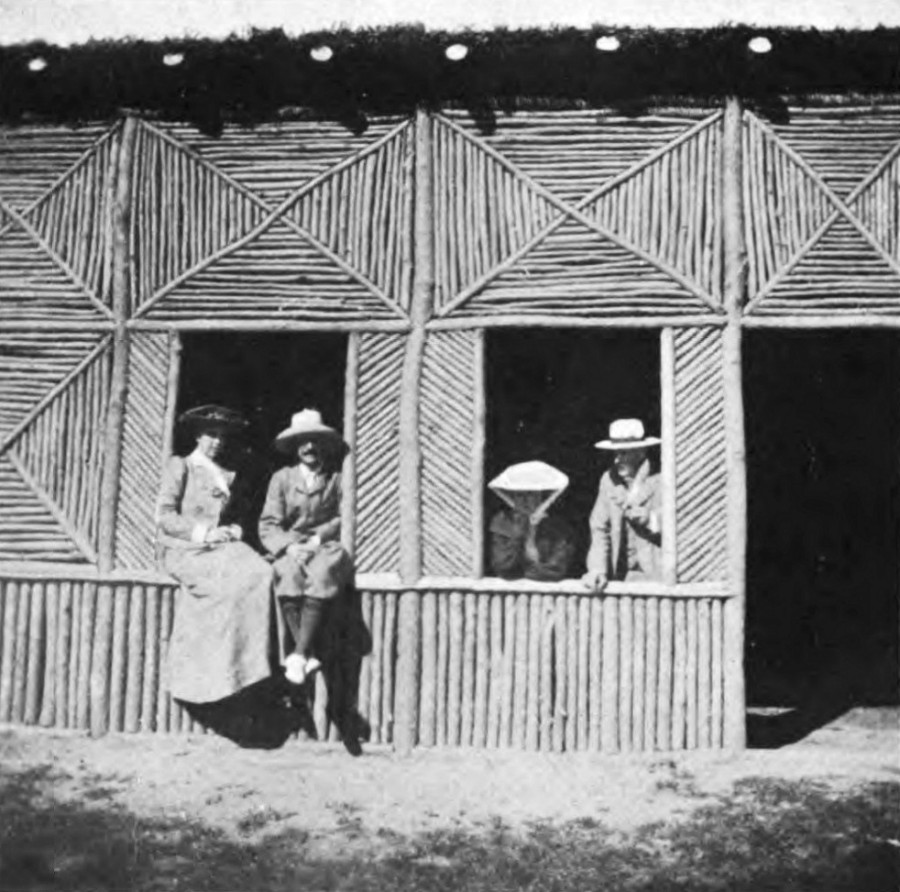
- The club-house, 1905

The Lake Como Golf Club was one of the first golf clubs in Italy. It was established at Dervio in 1905 and had ceased all activity before 1922.

It was founded chiefly on the initiative of a group of English residents holidaying in Bellagio: Margaret Scott, winner of the first three British Ladies Amateur championships (1893, 1894 and 1895), and her husband Frederick Gustavus Hamilton-Russell, who is recorded as the club's Captain.

In 1906 the club had 37 members, rising to 40 in 1908 and 1909, before returning to 37 in 1912.

== The course ==
The course was designed by J. H. Taylor and had nine holes, measuring 2,320 yards in 1912 and 2,347 yards in 1915.

This course is fortunate in possessing a light sandy soil and excellent greens. Though comparatively short, 2320 yards, each hole is made interesting by sand bunkers or natural hazards, chief among the latter being the river Varone, which lies obliquely across the course in front of the 9th tee, and adds to the interest of one or two other holes. The course has recently been lengthened and much improved.

— Margaret R. Hamilton-Russell, 1912

A club-house was built to accommodate English visitors; the building, although altered over the years, still stands today.

=== Diversion of the Varrone stream ===
In 1908 Frederick Gustavus Hamilton-Russell obtained permission to divert the final stretch of the Varrone stream so that it would cross the golf course. As a result, the stream bed was considerably shortened and made straight.

== Closure of the club ==
The golf club was still listed as active in 1921, but by February 1922 part of the course's land had already been transferred to the firm of Vincenzo Pensa.

== Bibliography ==
- Casanova, M., ed. (2014). Dervio. Il territorio e la storia. Dervio. ISBN 9788890623332.
- Meister, Christoph N. (2013). "Golf in Italy – Getting some dates right". Golfika: The European Association of Golf Historians & Collectors. 12: 16–19.
- Brivio, Dino. "Dervio". Itinerari lecchesi sul lago della 36. Lecco: Stampa Grafiche Stefanoni, Edizione della Banca popolare di Lecco.
- Wyndham, Horace (1921). "Golf in Italy". Baily's Magazine of Sports & Pastimes. 115. London: 111–113.
