= Luigi Lucherini =

Italian politician (1930–2022)

Mayor of Arezzo
- In office 28 June 1999 – 21 February 2006
- Preceded by: Paolo Ricci
- Succeeded by: Giuseppe Fanfani

Personal details
- Born: 6 January 1930 Arezzo, Italy
- Died: 9 August 2022 (aged 92) Arezzo, Italy
- Party: Forza Italia
- Education: University of Pisa
- Occupation: Engineer

Luigi Lucherini (6 January 1930 – 9 August 2022) was an Italian politician and engineer.

He was member of the Forza Italia party. He has served as Mayor of Arezzo from 1999 to 2006.

He was elected for the first time as mayor of Arezzo in 1999. He was sentenced at first instance to two years for abuse of office in 2008.

== Biography ==
Lucherini was born in Arezzo, Italy in 1930. He has two sons. He was President of the National Union of Italian freelance engineers from 1986 to 1995. He graduated in engineering in Pisa in 1956.

== See also ==
- List of mayors of Arezzo

Political offices
Preceded by Paolo Ricci	Mayor of Arezzo; 28 June 1999 – 21 February 2006	Succeeded by Giuseppe Fanfani
