= Tremenico =

Tremenico Tremènech (Lombard)
- Comune
- Comune di Tremenico
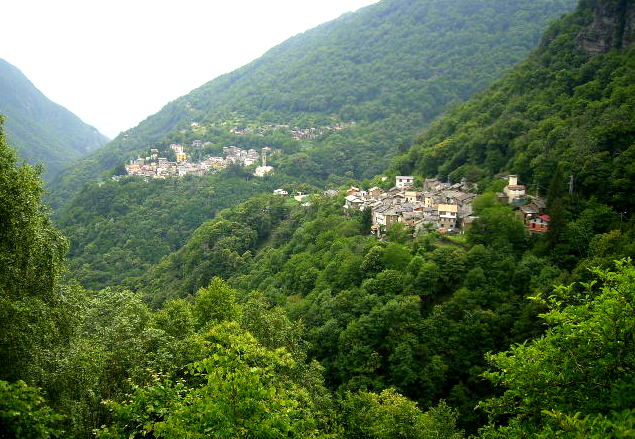
- Tremenico and Aveno

- Coat of arms

- Location within Italy Location within Lombardy
- Coordinates: 46°5′N 9°22′E
- Country: Italy
- Region: Lombardy
- Province: Lecco (LC)
- Frazioni: Avano, Pernighera, Coldirola, Consolino, Fenile, Pezzaburo

Government
  - Mayor: Flavio Cipelli

Area
  - Total: 8.9 km^{2} (3.4 sq mi)
- Elevation: 754 m (2,474 ft)

Population (30 November 2014)
  - Total: 171
  - Density: 19/km^{2} (50/sq mi)
- Demonym: Tremenicese
- Time zone: UTC+1 (CET)
  - Summer (DST): UTC+2 (CEST)
- Postal code: 23836
- Dialing code: 0341
- Patron saint: S. Agatha
- Saint day: February 5
- Website: Official website

Tremenico (Valvarronese: Tremènech) is a comune (municipality) in the Province of Lecco in the Italian region Lombardy, located about 70 kilometres (43 mi) north of Milan and about 25 kilometres (16 mi) north of Lecco.

Tremenico borders the following municipalities: Casargo, Colico, Dervio, Dorio, Introzzo, Pagnona, Vendrogno.
