= Introzzo =

Introzzo Introeuzz (Lombard)
- Comune
- Comune di Introzzo
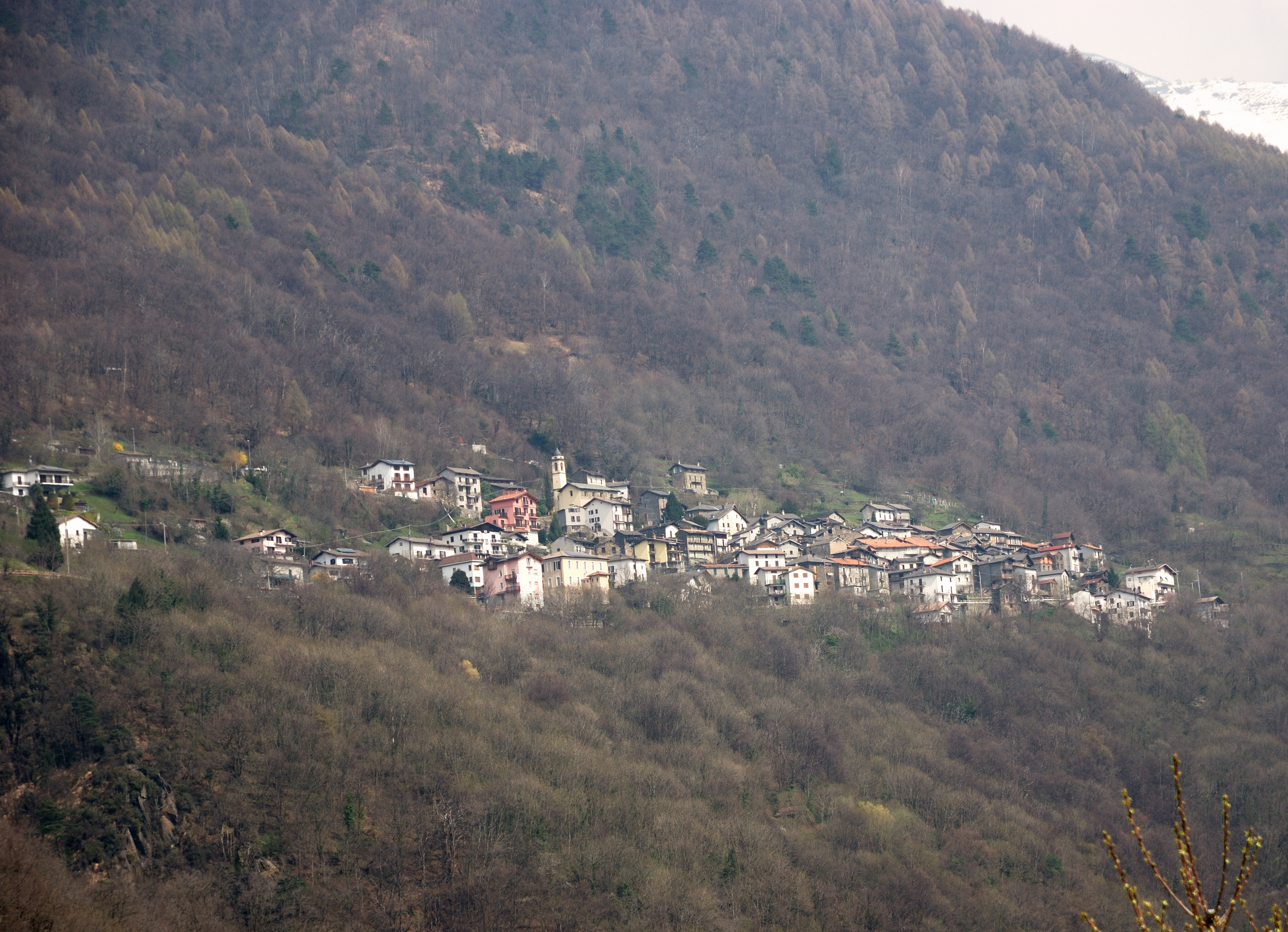

- Location within Italy Location within Lombardy
- Coordinates: 46°5′N 9°20′E
- Country: Italy
- Region: Lombardy
- Province: Lecco (LC)
- Frazioni: Lavadè, Subiale

Government
  - Mayor: Luca Buzzella

Area
  - Total: 3.8 km^{2} (1.5 sq mi)
- Elevation: 704 m (2,310 ft)

Population (31 August 2015)
  - Total: 124
  - Density: 33/km^{2} (85/sq mi)
- Demonym: Introzzesi
- Time zone: UTC+1 (CET)
  - Summer (DST): UTC+2 (CEST)
- Postal code: 22050
- Dialing code: 0341
- Website: Official website

Introzzo (Valvarronese: Introeuzz) is a comune (municipality) in the Province of Lecco in the Italian region Lombardy, located about 70 kilometres (43 mi) north of Milan and about 25 kilometres (16 mi) north of Lecco. Introzzo borders the following municipalities: Dervio, Dorio, Sueglio, Tremenico.
