= Vestreno =

Vestreno Vestren (Lombard)
- Comune
- Comune di Vestreno
- Location within Italy Location within Lombardy
- Coordinates: 46°5′N 9°19′E
- Country: Italy
- Region: Lombardy
- Province: Province of Lecco (LC)

Area
  - Total: 2.7 km^{2} (1.0 sq mi)

Population (Dec. 2004)
  - Total: 296
  - Density: 110/km^{2} (280/sq mi)
- Time zone: UTC+1 (CET)
  - Summer (DST): UTC+2 (CEST)
- Postal code: 22050
- Dialing code: 0341

Vestreno (Valvarronese: Vestren) is a comune (municipality) in the Province of Lecco in the Italian region Lombardy, located about 70 kilometres (43 mi) north of Milan and about 25 kilometres (16 mi) north of Lecco. As of 31 December 2004, it had a population of 296 and an area of 2.7 square kilometres (1.0 mi^{2}).

Vestreno borders the following municipalities: Dervio, Dorio, Sueglio.

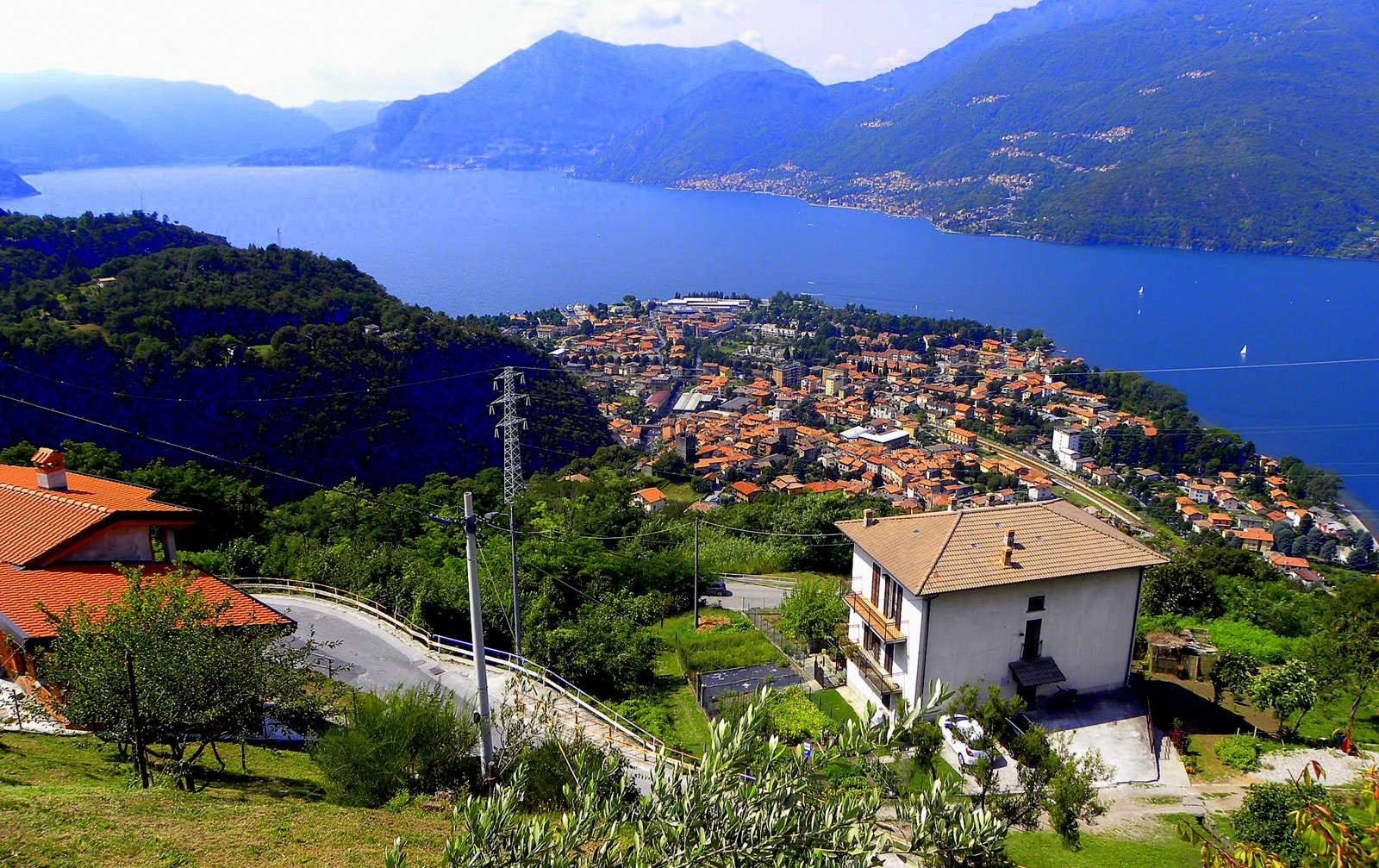

== Demographic evolution ==
Historical population

Year	Pop.	±%
1861	451	—
1871	454	+0.7%
1881	509	+12.1%
1901	494	−2.9%
1911	480	−2.8%

Year	Pop.	±%
1921	479	−0.2%
1931	443	−7.5%
1936	443	+0.0%
1951	428	−3.4%
1961	372	−13.1%

Year	Pop.	±%
1971	339	−8.9%
1981	308	−9.1%
1991	268	−13.0%
2001	291	+8.6%

Source: Data from ISTAT
