= Varrone Ducci =

Italian politician, landowner and lawyer

Podestà of Arezzo
- In office 11 November 1939 – 31 August 1943
- Preceded by: Pier Ludovico Occhini
- Succeeded by: Antonio Curina (mayor)

Personal details
- Born: 27 October 1898 Florence, Italy
- Died: 24 July 1945 (aged 46) Florence, Italy
- Party: National Fascist Party
- Occupation: landowner lawyer

Varrone Ducci (27 October 1898 – 24 July 1945) was an Italian politician, landowner and lawyer.

He served as fascist Podestà of Arezzo from 11 November 1939 to 31 August 1943.

== Biography ==
Varrone Ducci was born in Florence, Italy in 1898 and died there in 1945 at the age of 46. He was a lawyer.

== See also ==
- List of mayors of Arezzo

Political offices
Preceded by Pier Ludovico Occhini	Podestà of Arezzo; 11 November 1939—31 August 1943	Succeeded by Antonio Curina (mayor)
