= Bondal =

- Village
- Location in Punjab, India Bondal (India)
- Coordinates: 30°49′9″N 76°13′9″E
- Country: India
- State: Punjab
- District: Ludhiana
- Elevation: 250 m (820 ft)

Population (2011)
  - Total: 1,120

Languages
  - Official: Punjabi
- Time zone: UTC+5:30 (IST)
- PIN: 141114
- Telephone code 01628: +91-98-88-900980
- Vehicle registration: PB 43

Bondal is a village near Samrala in the Ludhiana district, in the Indian state of Punjab. It is about 38 km east of the district headquarters of Ludhiana, on the right side of the National Highway 95 to Chandigarh. Bondal is also known as Uchhi Bondal, because its elevation is about 12–15 meters (39–49 ft) higher than other areas nearby, having an average elevation of 260 meters (850 feet).

== Location ==
Bondal is located within the district of Ludhiana, in the Malwa region of the state of Punjab. For administrative purposes, it has been placed in the Patiala district.

Bondal is a village close to Samrala, district Ludhiana, Punjab, India. Its postal code is 141114. Due to its fertile land, Bondal's residents are mainly farmers. Bondal is located 14 km away from Khanna, where Asia's largest grain market can be found.

== Demographics ==
As of the 2011 Indian census, Bondal has a population of 1120. Males constitute 53% of the population and females 47%. Bondal has an average literacy rate of 71%, higher than the national average of 59.5%: male literacy is 74%, and female literacy is 68%. Bondal is a small village with only 550 qualified voters, with 40% of the population being under 18 years of age, while 12% is under 6 years of age. The village has an all-Sikh community. The village is dominated mainly by the Mangat clan.

== Climate ==
The climate of the village is characterised by dryness aside from a brief spell of heavy precipitation during monsoon season, and a particularly stark temperature contrast between summer and winter. The cold season lasts from mid-November to the early part of March. The succeeding period until the end of June is the hot season. July, August and half of September constitute the southwest monsoon season, while the period of mid-September to about the middle of November is the post-monsoon or transitional period. June is generally the hottest month. Hot and scorching dust-laden winds blow during summer season. December and January are the coldest months.

Climate data for Bondal
Month	Jan	Feb	Mar	Apr	May	Jun	Jul	Aug	Sep	Oct	Nov	Dec	Year
Mean daily maximum °C (°F)	19 (66)	21 (69)	26 (78)	34 (94)	38 (101)	39 (103)	34 (94)	33 (91)	33 (92)	32 (89)	26 (79)	21 (69)	30 (85)
Mean daily minimum °C (°F)	7 (44)	8 (47)	13 (55)	18 (65)	23 (73)	26 (79)	26 (79)	24 (76)	23 (74)	17 (63)	11 (52)	7 (45)	17 (63)
Average precipitation mm (inches)	20 (0.80)	38 (1.50)	30 (1.20)	20 (0.80)	20 (0.80)	61 (2.40)	229 (9.00)	188 (7.40)	86 (3.40)	5.1 (0.20)	13 (0.50)	20 (0.80)	730.1 (28.8)
Source: The Weather Channel

=== Rainfall ===
The rainfall in the village increases from the southwest toward the northeast. About 70% of the rainfall is received during the period of July through September. The rainfall between December and March accounts for 16% of the total rainfall, with the remaining 14% rainfall received in the other months of the year.
