= Bellano =

Bellano Belàan (Lombard)
- Comune
- Comune di Bellano
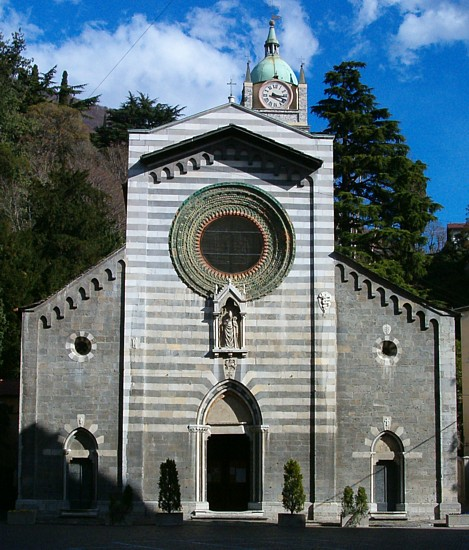
- Church of SS Nazaro e Celso

- Location within Italy Location within Lombardy
- Coordinates: 46°3′N 9°18′E
- Country: Italy
- Region: Lombardy
- Province: Lecco (LC)
- Frazioni: Biosio, Bonzeno, Costa, Gora, Grabbia, Lezzeno, Ombriaco, Oro, Pegnino, Pendaglio, Pennaso, Pernice, Ponte Oro, Pradello, Rivalba, Valletta, Verginate

Government
  - Mayor: Antonio Rusconi

Area
  - Total: 10.23 km^{2} (3.95 sq mi)
- Elevation: 202 m (663 ft)

Population (30 April 2017)
  - Total: 3,204
  - Density: 313.2/km^{2} (811.2/sq mi)
- Demonym: Bellanesi
- Time zone: UTC+1 (CET)
  - Summer (DST): UTC+2 (CEST)
- Postal code: 23822
- Dialing code: 0341
- Patron saint: Sts. Nazarius and Celsus
- Saint day: 28 July
- Website: Official website

Bellano (Comasco: Belàan [beˈlãː]) is a comune (municipality) and small town on the eastern shore of Lake Como in the Province of Lecco in the Italian region Lombardy, located at northern outlet of the Valsassina.

== Geography ==
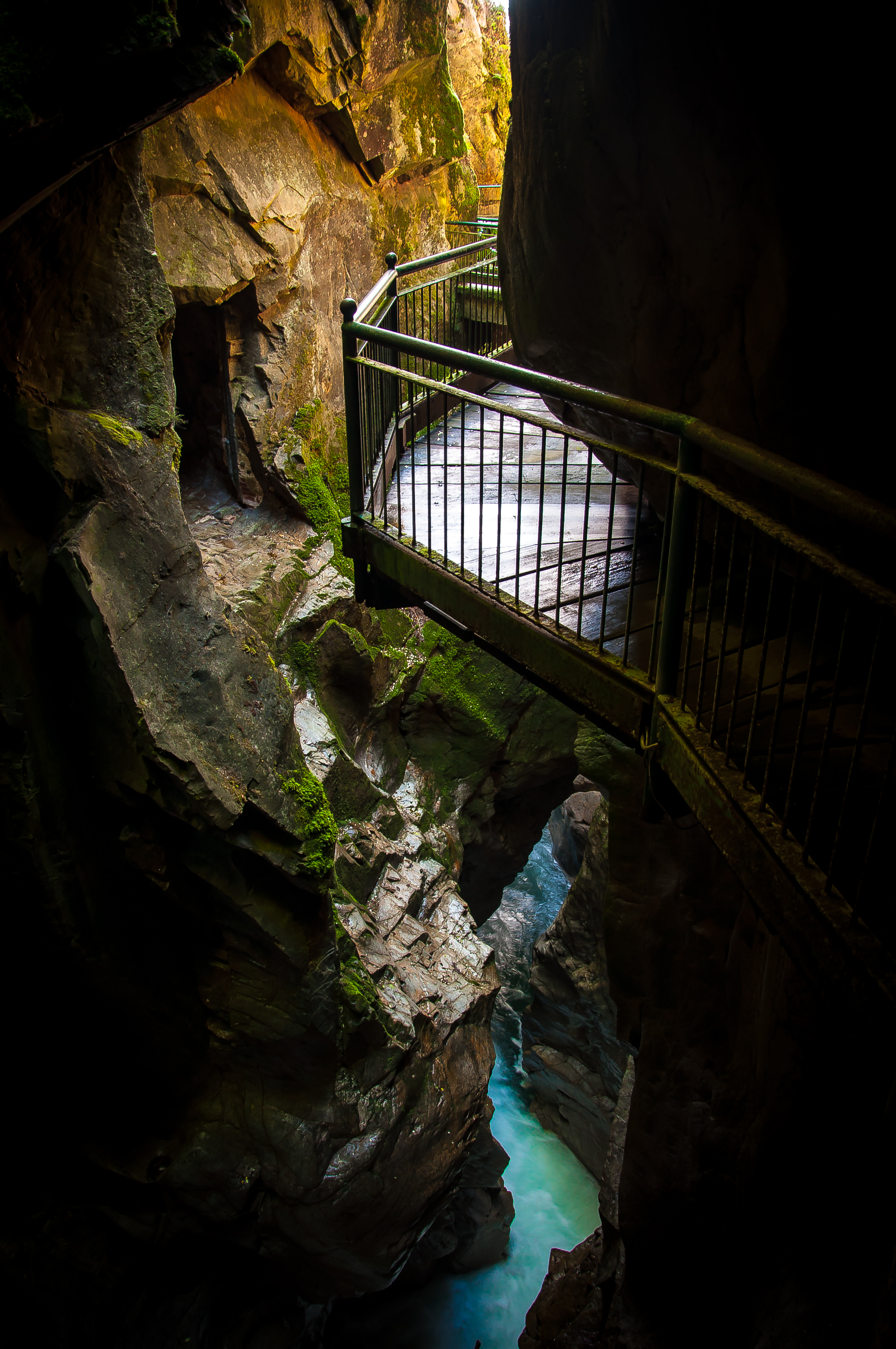
Orrido di Bellano

Bellano extends from the shores of Lake Como up the slopes of the surrounding mountains, incorporating the valley of the Pioverna stream. Since 1 January 2020, the municipality has also included the former Vendrogno area, which lies higher up toward the slopes of Monte Croce di Muggio (1,799 m). A notable natural attraction is the Orrido di Bellano, a deep gorge carved over millions of years by the Pioverna River through rock formations shaped by glacial and fluvial erosion.

== History ==
=== Antiquity and Early Middle Ages ===
Archaeological evidence suggests human presence in the Bellano area during Roman times, with burial sites discovered locally. By 905 AD, Bellano was under the jurisdiction of the Archdiocese of Milan, as referenced in a judicial document mentioning the "Curtis sancti Ambrosii, que Belano dicitur".

=== Middle Ages ===
In the Middle Ages Bellano came under the control of the Torriani family, later passing to the Visconti of Milan. The town developed fortifications and a Pretorio (magistrate’s seat) and received the right to enact local statutes in 1370. It was attacked and looted by Venetian troops in 1447. From 1533 until 1788 Bellano formed part of the feudal holdings of the Sfondrati family, after which it reverted to direct control under the Duchy of Milan.

=== Modern Era ===
During the 19th century, Bellano became an important small industrial centre on Lake Como, notably for textiles with firms such as the Cotonificio Cantoni. Following the decline of industry in the late 20th century, the town’s economy shifted toward tourism and services. On 1 January 2020, Bellano incorporated the nearby municipality of Vendrogno. In 2021 it joined the association of I Borghi più belli d'Italia ("The most beautiful villages of Italy").

== Demographics ==
According to ISTAT data, Bellano’s population has gradually declined over recent decades—from 3,131 in 1991 to around 3,056 in 2011. Residents are known as Bellanesi.

== Economy ==
Historically, the Bellano area produced local wines such as claretto (white wine), vin del tecc (Marsala-style fortified wine), and vino di paglia (straw wine). In the 19th and early 20th centuries, textile manufacturing played a major role in the local economy. Today, tourism, lake-related services, and small enterprises dominate the economic landscape.

== Main sights ==
- Orrido di Bellano – a gorge with dramatic rock formations and waterfalls, accessible via wooden walkways.
- Chiesa dei Santi Nazaro e Celso – Gothic church (1348) with a Romanesque plan and an ornate rose window.
- Lakeside promenade – featuring views across Lake Como and several small pebble beaches.
- Historic industrial buildings such as the former Cotonificio Cantoni, testimony to Bellano’s industrial past.

== Culture ==
Bellano is often described as the "town of artists" for its strong association with local painters, sculptors, musicians, and writers. Each year, on 5 January, the town celebrates the traditional Pesa Vegia festival—an event dating back over 400 years, featuring a historical re-enactment, a bonfire on the lake pier, and a parade of the Magi. The novelist Andrea Vitali set many of his works in Bellano.

== Transport ==
Bellano is served by the Bellano–Tartavalle Terme railway station on the Tirano–Lecco railway, with regular services to Milan (approximately 70 minutes). It is also accessible by ferry services on Lake Como and by road via the SS36 highway linking Lecco to Colico.

== Governance ==
Bellano is administered as a municipality within the Province of Lecco. As of 2017, the mayor was Antonio Rusconi.

== Symbols ==
The municipal coat of arms (updated by decree on 30 September 2021) features elements referencing the Torriani and Visconti families and a ship symbolizing Bellano’s lakeside character.

== In popular culture ==
Bellano features prominently in the novels of local author Andrea Vitali, who portrays the town’s people and traditions with humour

== See also ==
- Lake Como
- Valsassina
- I Borghi più belli d'Italia
