= Morbio =

Morbio may refer to:

- Morbio Inferiore, a village in Switzerland
- Morbio Superiore, a village in Switzerland
