= Breggia, Switzerland =

Breggia
- Municipality
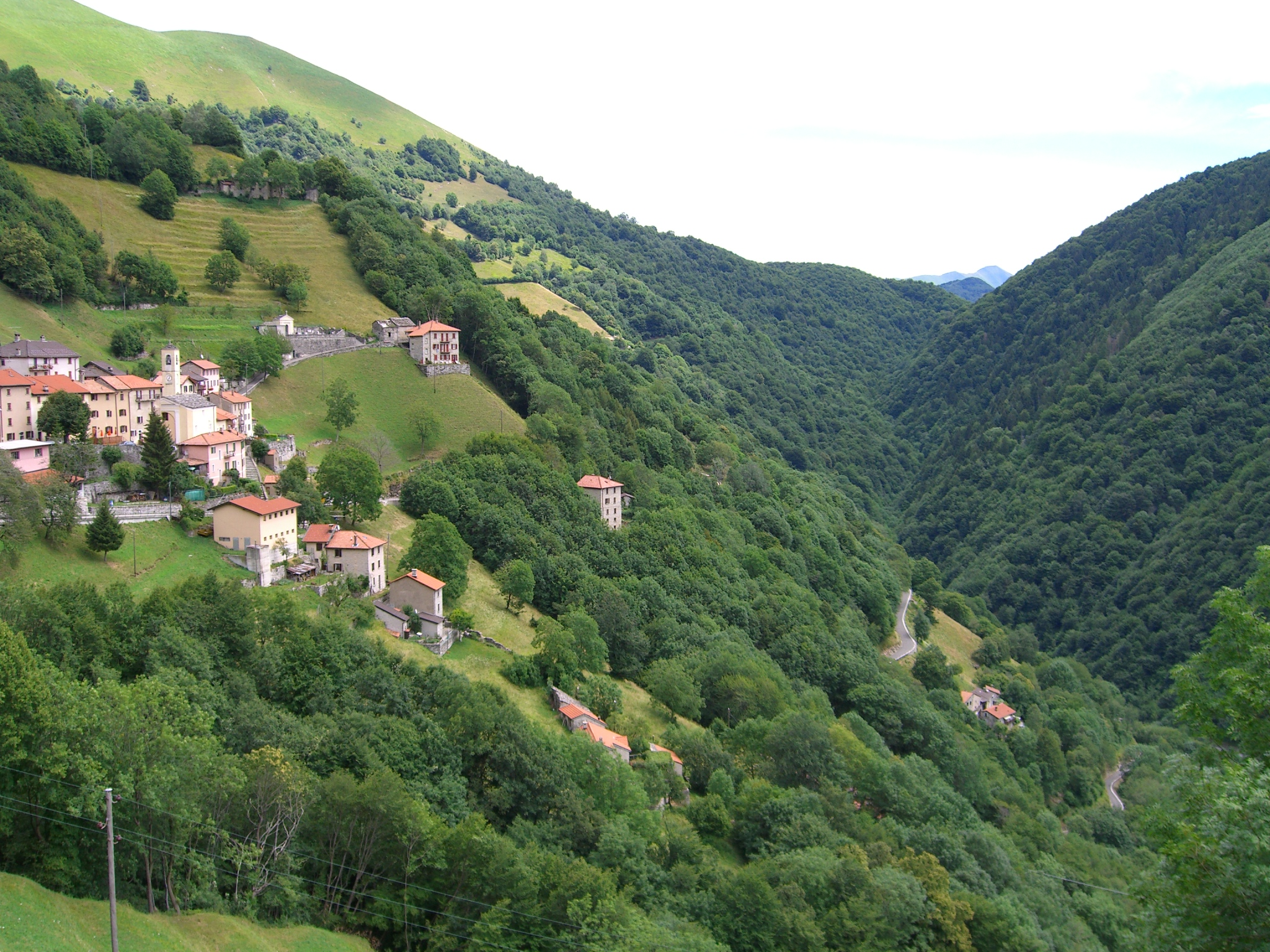
- Muggio Valley

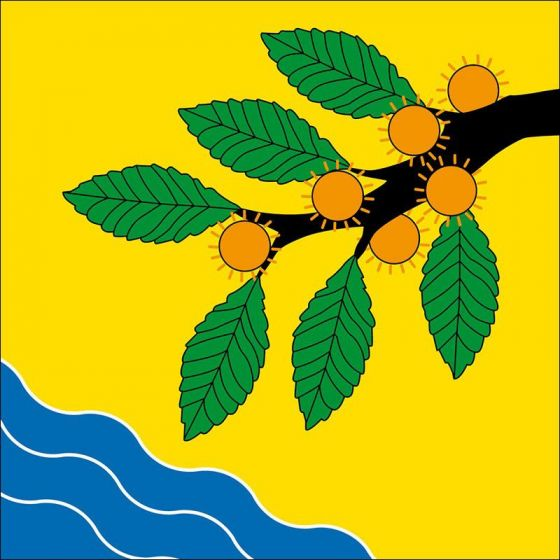
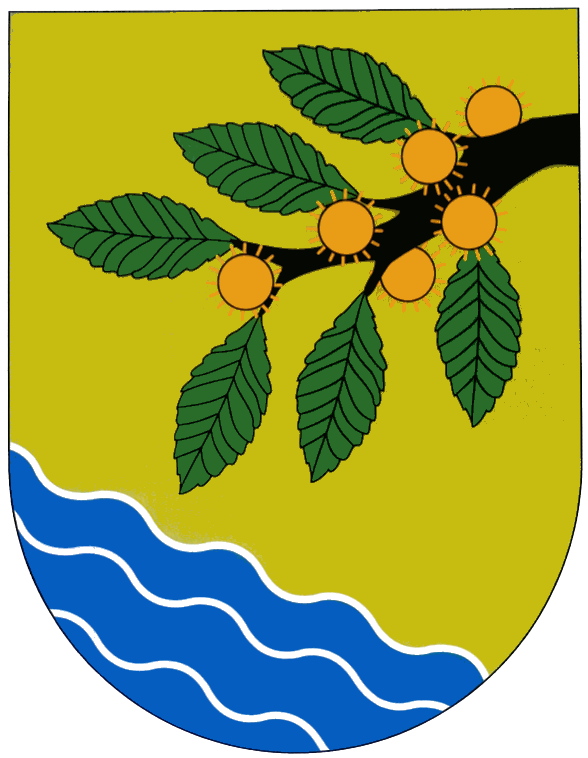
- Flag Coat of arms
- Location of Breggia
- Location within Switzerland Location within Canton of Ticino
- Coordinates: 45°52′N 9°02′E
- Country: Switzerland
- Canton: Ticino
- District: Mendrisio

Government
  - Mayor: Sindaco

Area
  - Total: 25.85 km^{2} (9.98 sq mi)
- Elevation: 704 m (2,310 ft)

Population (December 2004)
  - Total: 1,929
  - Density: 74.62/km^{2} (193.3/sq mi)
- Time zone: UTC+01:00 (CET)
  - Summer (DST): UTC+02:00 (CEST)
- SFOS number: 5269
- ISO 3166 code: CH-TI
- Surrounded by: Castel San Pietro, Moltrasio (IT-CO), Schignano (IT-CO)
- Website: www.comunebreggia.ch/

Breggia is a municipality in the district of Mendrisio in the canton of Ticino in Switzerland. On 25 October 2009 the municipalities of Bruzella, Cabbio, Caneggio, Morbio Superiore, Muggio and Sagno merged into the municipality of Breggia.

== History ==
Bruzella is first mentioned in 852 as Brusella. Cabbio is first mentioned in 1188 as Cabio. Caneggio is first mentioned in 1209 as Canegio. In 1335 it was mentioned as Canezio. Morbio Superiore is first mentioned in 1116 as Morbio de Supra. Muggio is first mentioned in 852 as Mugio. Sagno is first mentioned around 1296-99 as Sagnio.

=== Brusella ===
Until 1609 it was united territorially with Monte, and until 1649 it was part of the parish of Caneggio. The Church of S. Siro is first mentioned in 1579. It was rebuilt in the 18th century, and restored in 1973.

Traditionally, cheese production and forestry (production of timber and charcoal) were the main economic sources. This was supplemented by periodic waves of emigration. By 1985, agriculture only employed six people. At the beginning of the 21st century, the population was largely made of retirees and commuters.

=== Cabbio ===
The village was mentioned in 1299 as a part of the holdings of Como Cathedral and Rusca Castle in Como. It was part of the parish of Muggio until the first half of the 17th century, and part of the political municipality until 1673. It was part of the parish of Balerna until the early 19th century. Until 1805, Cabbio also included the village of Casima (now part of Castel San Pietro. The parish church of S. Salvatore was first mentioned in 1579. It was rebuilt in 1780-95 and newly consecrated in 1818.

The village economy was traditionally based on forest and alpine farming, as well as emigration to other countries.

=== Caneggio ===
Roman era graves were discovered in Campora.

The village was part of the parish of Bruzella. They separated in 1649, and Caneggio, probably in the same century, joined the parish of Balerna. The church of S. Maria Assunta is first mentioned in 1566. In 1715, it was rebuilt and renovated in 1971-75.

The village had limited farming land, so the local economy was based on alpine pastures and forestry. Due to the limited land, many residents of the village emigrated to other countries. With the rise of the services sector in the second half of the 20th century the population stabilized. The residents are now mostly commuters.

=== Morbio Superiore ===
In the Middle Ages (first mentioned in 1299) the village was owned by Como Cathedral and the Benedictine monastery of S. Abbondio in Como. The church of S. Vittore in Balerna also owned property in the village. From 1591 until the 17th century, Morbio and Sagno were a vice parish under the mother church at Balerna. In 1802 Morbio Superiore was a separate parish.

The parish church of S. Giovanni Evangelista was first mentioned in 1227. In the 18th century, it was totally rebuilt and then renovated in 1957. The chapel of San Martino, originally an Early Middle Ages romanesque building stands on the site of what might be an Ostrogoth watchtower from the 6th century. The Chapel of S. Anna is from the late Baroque period.

Formerly, the village was surrounded by vineyards, tobacco and mulberry cultivation, of which only the vineyards remain. In the last decades of the 20th century, Morbio Superiore developed into a residential community. Since 1960, Lattecaldo has been the headquarters of the Cantonal Forestry School. In 2000, four-fifths of the workforce worked outside the community.

=== Muggio ===
The Muggio valley has been inhabited since ancient times, and by the 9th century farmers had settled in the village. It was included in the 1299 listing of land owned by Como Cathedral. At that time it was part of the parish of Cabbio. In 1673 it became a vice-parish, which was supported, until the 19th century, by the mother church at Balerna.

The Church of San Lorenzo was first mentioned in 1578. In 1760 it was rebuilt and it was renovated several times, most recently in 2003-04.

The inhabitants lived on agriculture and animal husbandry as well as emigration, especially of artists, to other countries. Several large waves of emigration occurred between 1850 and 1940. Since the 1950s the population has continued to decline.

=== Sagno ===
Scattered finds from the Bronze Age suggest that the valley was settled prehistorically. During the Middle Ages it was part of the Pieve of Balerna. Together with Morbio Superiore it formed a vice-parish, which depended on the mother church at Balerna. They broke away in the 17th century and in 1802 became an independent parish.

The parish church of San Michele Arcangelo was first mentioned in 1330, but is of much older origin. In 1789-99 it was rebuilt in the Classicist style and it was renovated in 1982-83.

In 1843, near Mount Bisbino, a violent political conflict, the so-called Fatti del Bisbino broke out. Throughout Ticino in the 1830s and 1840s, there had been a conflict between the conservative, catholic side and the liberals. Following a religious celebration at Monte Bisbino, on 2 July 1843 a troupe of about 20 people were heading home, amusing themselves with singing. A group of radicals encountered the troupe and an argument broke out. A priest was wounded, and several members of the liberal group; Briester Bernasconi, one of his servants and Charles Casartelli, were killed. Reprisals for the attack led to the deaths of the Bruzella pastor, Father Michael Cereghetti, and the baker Antonio Ferrari.

Agriculture and livestock constitute the main long-term sources of income. This was supplemented, by a seasonal migration, especially of bricklayers and stonemasons from Italy. Starting in the 1970s, the population increased slightly. In 2000 about four-fifths of the working population of Sagno were commuters, mostly to Chiasso.

== Coat of arms ==
The present municipal coat of arms, adopted on the occasion of the creation of the new municipality, shows a branch of chestnut with 6 leaves and 6 chestnuts to represent the 6 former municipalities, and in the bottom left the River Breggia.

== Geography ==
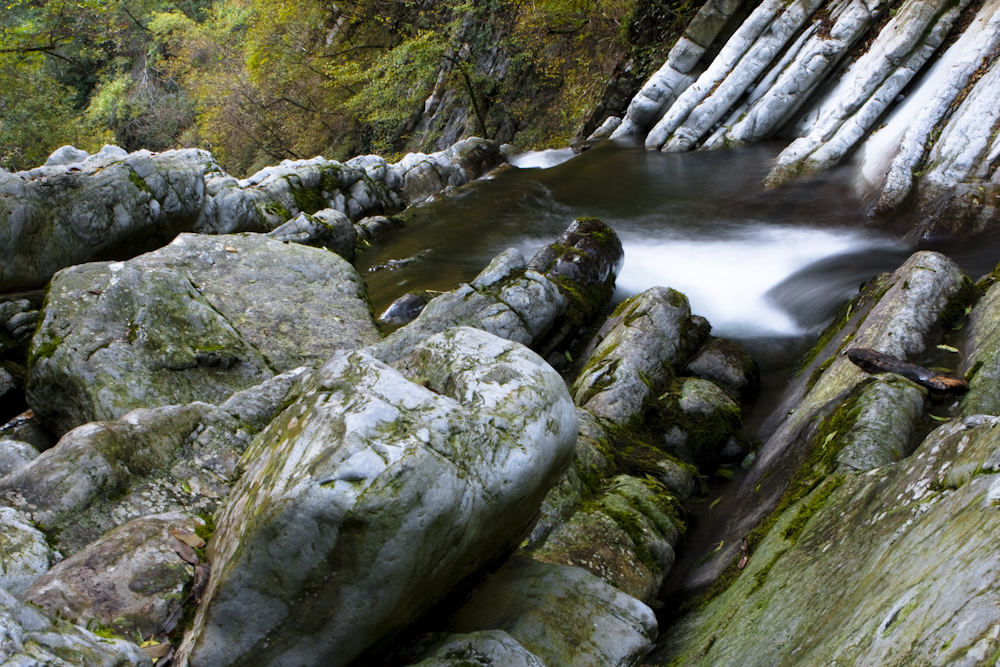
Breggia River

Breggia has an area, as of 1997, of 25.48 square kilometers (9.84 sq mi). Of this area, 2.31 km^{2} (0.89 sq mi) or 9.1% is used for agricultural purposes, while 20.98 km^{2} (8.10 sq mi) or 82.3% is forested. Of the rest of the land, 0.99 km^{2} (0.38 sq mi) or 3.9% is settled (buildings or roads), 0.08 km^{2} (20 acres) or 0.3% is either rivers or lakes and 0.24 km^{2} (0.093 sq mi) or 0.9% is unproductive land.

== Historic Population ==
The historical population is given in the following chart:

== Crime ==
In 2014 the crime rate, of the over 200 crimes listed in the Swiss Criminal Code (running from murder, robbery and assault to accepting bribes and election fraud), in Breggia was 23.9 per thousand residents. This rate is lower than average, at only 55.1% of the rate in the district, 43.6% of the cantonal rate and 37.0% of the average rate in the entire country. During the same period, the rate of drug crimes and violations of immigration, visa and work permit laws was 0 per thousand residents.

== Weather ==
Between 1961 and 1990 Bruzella had an average of 104.4 days of rain or snow per year and on average received 1,680 mm (66 in) of precipitation. The wettest month was May during which time Bruzella received an average of 213 mm (8.4 in) of rain or snow. During this month there was precipitation for an average of 13.1 days. The driest month of the year was December with an average of 74 mm (2.9 in) of precipitation over 5.8 days.

Between 1981 and 2010 Morbio Superiore had an average of 97.9 days of rain or snow per year and on average receives 1,610.7 mm (63.41 in) of precipitation. The wettest month is May during which time Morbio Superiore receives an average of 196.7 mm (7.74 in) of rain or snow. During this month there is precipitation for an average of 12.2 days. The driest month of the year is February with an average of 65.2 mm (2.57 in) of precipitation over 4.8 days.
