= Giovanni Pietro Magni =

Giovanni Pietro Magni, aka Pietro Magno (2 May 1655 – 1722/1724) was a German stuccoist born in Switzerland. He decorated many buildings across central Germany in the late 1600s and early 1700s, particularly under the patronage of the Prince-Bishop of Würzburg.

== Biography ==
Giovanni Pietro Magni was born on 2 May 1655 in Bruzella, a settlement on the eastern outskirts of Mendrisio in Switzerland’s Italian-speaking Ticino canton, to Giovanni Pietro Magni and Marta Parravicini. His family was connected with various other artistic families in the valley of the Muggio, including the Pozzis, Bernasconis and Salterios. He married Ursula, the daughter of the architect Carlo Salterio and his wife Angelica, with whom he had at least four children.

Magni studied under the sculptor Agostino Silva in Morbio Inferiore, and completed his education in Rome where he worked alongside other Ticinese sculptors such as Antonio Raggi and Ercole Ferrata.

By 1686, Magni had arrived in Franconia, where he was associated with the architect Antonio Petrini. By 1700, he became court stuccoist to Prince-Bishop of Würzburg, Johan Philipp von Greifenclau zu Vollraths, for whom he carried out much of his best work, including the elaborate and large-scale baroque stucco interior of the Kiliansdom (Würzburg Cathedral, mostly collapsed due to bomb damage in 1946 and subsequently restored). Magni's work here has been described as "the most important example of the Italian stucco baroque in Franconia".

He returned to his homeland, probably on the death of his patron Bishop Johan Philipp in 1719, and died in either 1722 or 1724 in Castel San Pietro.

== Works ==
- The hall of Elisabethenburg Palace in Meiningen (1686).
- Collegiate Church of the Cistercian Abbey in Waldsassen (1688).
- Cistercian Abbey in Ebrach (1694).
- Convent of Michelsberg, Bamberg (1697-1699).
- Cathedral of Saint Kilian (the Kiliansdom) in Würzburg (1701-1706).
- Juliusspital Prince's Room (Fürstenzimmer), hospital and garden pavilion, Würzburg (1707-8).
- Various sites between Würzburg and Bamberg (1700s - 1720s)
- Church of Saint John the Baptist in Mendrisio (1722-1723).
