= Emilio Bossi =

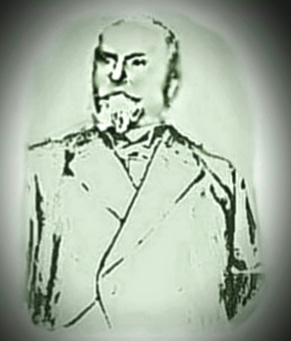
- Born: 31 December 1870; Bruzella
- Died: 27 November 1920 (aged 49); Lugano
- Occupations: Journalist, lawyer

Emilio Bossi (31 December 1870 – 27 November 1920) was a Swiss freethinker, journalist, lawyer and writer.

Bossi was born in Bruzella. He graduated in law at the University of Geneva. He wrote under the pseudonym Milesbo. He was an editor (1896–1902) and director (1915–1920) of the Gazzetta Ticinese newspaper and founded the L'Idea moderna newspaper in 1895. In 1906 he founded L'Azione, a radical-democratic group. He was one of the founders of the Unione Radicale Sociale Ticinese, a political group that requested separation of church and state.

He was deputy to the Grand Council of Ticino (1905–10, 1914–20), the National Council (1914–20) and the Council of States (1920). He was the Ticino State Councillor and was Director of the Department of Interior (1910–1914).

Bossi was an advocate of the Christ myth theory. In 1904, he authored the book Gesù Cristo non è mai esistito (Jesus Christ Never Existed).

== Publications ==
- Sulla separazione dello Stato dalla Chiesa (1899)
- Gesù Cristo non è mai esistito (1900)
- I clericali e la libertà (1909)
- Venti mesi di storia svizzera (1916)
