= Cabbio =

- Former municipality
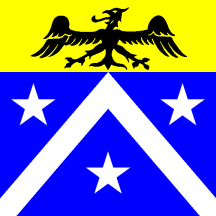
- Flag Coat of arms
- Location of Cabbio
- Location within Switzerland Location within Canton of Ticino
- Coordinates: 45°53′N 9°03′E
- Country: Switzerland
- Canton: Ticino
- District: Mendrisio

Government
  - Mayor: Arno Codoni

Area
  - Total: 5.69 km^{2} (2.20 sq mi)
- Elevation: 667 m (2,188 ft)

Population (December 2004)
  - Total: 207
  - Density: 36.4/km^{2} (94.2/sq mi)
- Time zone: UTC+01:00 (CET)
  - Summer (DST): UTC+02:00 (CEST)
- Postal code: 6838
- SFOS number: 5245
- ISO 3166 code: CH-TI
- Surrounded by: Bruzella, Caneggio, Castel San Pietro, Centro Valle Intelvi (Italy), Cerano d'Intelvi (Italy), Muggio, Schignano (Italy)
- Website: SFSO statistics

Cabbio was a municipality in the district of Mendrisio in the canton of Ticino in Switzerland. On 25 October 2009. the municipalities of Bruzella, Cabbio, Caneggio, Morbio Superiore, Muggio, Sagno, and Breggia merged into the municipality of Breggia

== History ==
Cabbio is first mentioned in 1188 as Cabio. The village was mentioned again in 1299 as a part of the holdings of Como Cathedral and Rusca Castle in Como. It was part of the parish of Muggio until the first half of the 17th century, and part of the political municipality until 1673. It was part of the parish of Balerna until the early 19th century. Until 1805, Cabbio also included the village of Casima (now part of Castel San Pietro). The parish church of S. Salvatore was first mentioned in 1579. It was rebuilt in 1780-95 and newly consecrated in 1818.

The village economy was traditionally based on forest and alpine farming, as well as emigration to other countries.

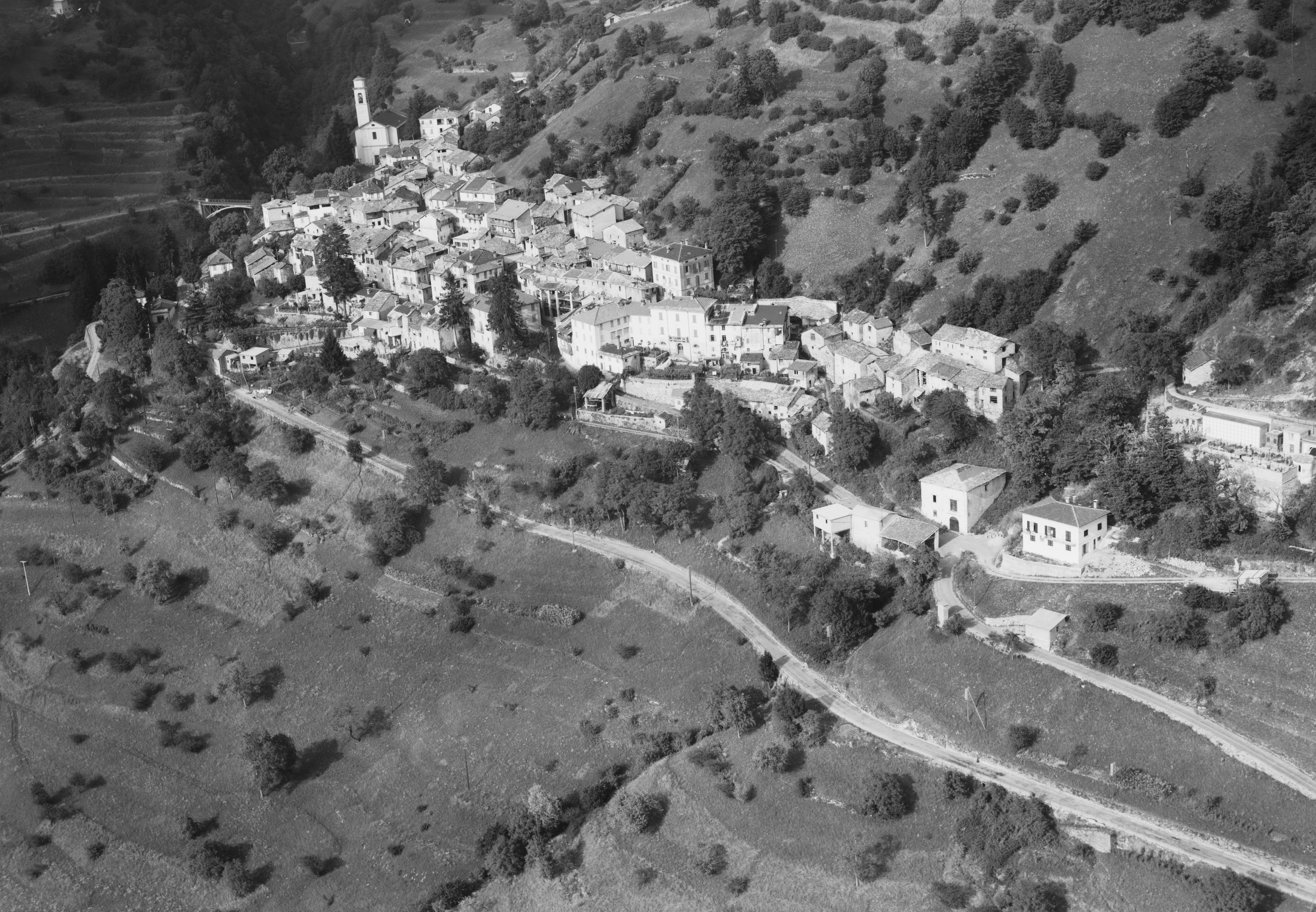
Aerial view (1964)

== Geography ==
Cabbio has an area, as of 1997, of 5.69 square kilometers (2.20 sq mi). Of this area, 0.27 km^{2} (0.10 sq mi), or 4.7% is used for agricultural purposes, while 4.81 km^{2} (1.86 sq mi) or 84.5% is forested. Of the rest of the land, 0.09 km^{2} (22 acres) or 1.6% is settled (buildings or roads), 0.02 km^{2} (4.9 acres) or 0.4% is either rivers or lakes and 0.04 km^{2} (9.9 acres) or 0.7% is unproductive land.

Of the built-up area, housing and buildings made up 0.5% and transportation infrastructure made up 0.9%. Out of the forested land, 80.8% of the total land area is heavily forested and 3.7% is covered with orchards or small clusters of trees. Of the agricultural land, 4.2% is used for growing crops. All the water in the municipality is flowing water.

The village is located in the Mendrisio district, on the left side of the Valle di Muggio. It consists of the village of Cabbio, the settlement of Uggine and the abandoned village of Gaggio.

== Coat of arms ==
The blazon of the municipal coat of arms is Azure a chevron argent between three mullets of five of the same and on a chief or an eagle displayed sable.

== Demographics ==
Cabbio has a population (As of December 2004) of 207.

Of the Swiss national languages (as of 2000), 16 speak German, 1 person speaks French, 153 people speak Italian. The remainder (3 people) speak another language.

In 2008 there were 2 live births to Swiss citizens and were 3 deaths of Swiss citizens. Ignoring immigration and emigration, the population of Swiss citizens decreased by 1 while the foreign population remained the same. At the same time, there was 1 non-Swiss man who immigrated from another country to Switzerland. The total Swiss population change in 2008 (from all sources, including moves across municipal borders) was a decrease of 3 and the non-Swiss population change was a decrease of 3 people. This represents a population growth rate of -3.0%.

In 2000 there were 134 single-family homes (or 88.7% of the total) out of a total of 151 inhabited buildings. There were 13 multi-family buildings (8.6%) and 4 other use buildings (commercial or industrial) that also had some housing (2.6%). Of the single-family homes 2 were built before 1919, while 2 were built between 1990 and 2000. The greatest number of single-family homes (83) were built between 1919 and 1945. In 2000 there were 168 apartments in the village. The most common apartment size was 4 rooms of which there were 47. There were 21 single room apartments and 50 apartments with five or more rooms. Of these apartments, a total of 75 apartments (44.6% of the total) were permanently occupied, while 93 apartments (55.4%) were seasonally occupied.

The historical population is given in the following chart:

== Politics ==
In the 2007 federal election, the most popular party was the FDP which received 30.69% of the vote. The next three most popular parties were the SP (29.88%), the CVP (14.63%), and the Green Party (11.99%). In the federal election, a total of 64 votes were cast, and the voter turnout was 41.0%.

In the 2007 Gran Consiglio election, there were a total of 156 registered voters in Cabbio, of which 90 or 57.7% voted. 1 blank ballot was cast, leaving 89 valid ballots in the election. The most popular party was the PLRT which received 26 or 29.2% of the vote. The next three most popular parties were; the PS (with 24 or 27.0%), the PPD+GenGiova (with 11 or 12.4%), and the PPD+GenGiova (with 11 or 12.4%).

In the 2007 Consiglio di Stato election, 2 blank ballots and 1 null ballot were cast, leaving 87 valid ballots in the election. The most popular party was the PS which received 29 or 33.3% of the vote. The next three most popular parties were; the PLRT (with 28 or 32.2%), the PPD (with 11 or 12.6%) and the LEGA (with 10 or 11.5%).

== Economy ==
Out of the residents in the village, a total of 71 individuals were employed, with 29.6% of them being female. The statistics from 2008 revealed a total of 12 full-time equivalent jobs, with 10 jobs in the primary sector, all of which were related to agriculture. There was only one job in the secondary sector related to manufacturing, and one job in the tertiary sector.

In 2000, 53 workers commuted away from the village.

== Religion ==
From the 2000 census, 140 or 80.9% were Roman Catholic, while 15 or 8.7% belonged to the Swiss Reformed Church. There are 15 individuals (or about 8.67% of the population) who belong to another church (not listed on the census), and 3 individuals (or about 1.73% of the population) did not answer the question.

== Education ==
As of 2000, 20 students from Cabbio attended schools outside the village.
