= Mendrisio District =

Coordinates: 45°52′N 8°59′E

Mendrisio District Distretto di Mendrisio
- District
- Country: Switzerland
- Canton: Ticino
- Capital: Mendrisio
- Municipalities: 11

Area
  - Total: 100.89 km^{2} (38.95 sq mi)

Population (2020)
  - Total: 49,969
  - Density: 495.28/km^{2} (1,282.8/sq mi)
- Time zone: UTC+1 (CET)
  - Summer (DST): UTC+2 (CEST)

The Mendrisio District (Italian: Distretto di Mendrisio, also called Mendrisiotto) is the southernmost district of canton of Ticino and of Switzerland. To its north lies the Lugano District. It is surrounded on the other three sides by Italy: to the east and south by the province of Como, and to the west by the province of Varese. It has a population of 49,969 (as of 31 December 2020).

== Geography ==
The Mendrisio District has an area, as of 1997, of 100.89 square kilometers (38.95 sq mi). Of this area, 25.79 km^{2} (9.96 sq mi) or 25.6% is used for agricultural purposes, while 61.2 km^{2} (23.6 sq mi) or 60.7% is forested. Of the rest of the land, 18.88 km^{2} (7.29 sq mi) or 18.7% is settled (buildings or roads), 0.44 km^{2} (0.17 sq mi) or 0.4% is either rivers or lakes and 0.99 km^{2} (0.38 sq mi) or 1.0% is unproductive land.

Of the built up area, industrial buildings made up 2.0% of the total area while housing and buildings made up 9.7% and transportation infrastructure made up 5.3%. Power and water infrastructure as well as other special developed areas made up 1.1% of the area Out of the forested land, 57.0% of the total land area is heavily forested and 3.6% is covered with orchards or small clusters of trees. Of the agricultural land, 11.9% is used for growing crops, while 4.0% is used for orchards or vine crops and 9.7% is used for alpine pastures. All the water in the district is flowing water.

== Demographics ==
The Mendrisio District has a population (as of December 2020) of 49,969. Of the Swiss national languages (as of 2000), 2,083 speak German, 534 people speak French, 41,239 people speak Italian, and 37 people speak Romansh. The remainder (1,831 people) speak another language.

As of 2008, the gender distribution of the population was 48.0% male and 52.0% female. The population was made up of 17,942 Swiss men (36.7% of the population), and 5,508 (11.3%) non-Swiss men. There were 20,501 Swiss women (42.0%), and 4,900 (10.0%) non-Swiss women.

In 2008 there were 351 live births to Swiss citizens and 80 births to non-Swiss citizens, and in same time span there were 352 deaths of Swiss citizens and 82 non-Swiss citizen deaths. Ignoring immigration and emigration, the population of Swiss citizens decreased by 1 while the foreign population decreased by 2. There were 4 Swiss men and 8 Swiss women who immigrated back to Switzerland. At the same time, there were 300 non-Swiss men and 265 non-Swiss women who immigrated from another country to Switzerland. The total Swiss population change in 2008 (from all sources) was an increase of 193 and the non-Swiss population change was an increase of 291 people. This represents a population growth rate of 1.0%.

The age distribution, as of 2009, in the district of Mendrisio is: 4,222 children or 8.6% of the population are between 0 and 9 years old and 4,878 teenagers or 10.0% are between 10 and 19. Of the adult population, 4,961 people or 10.2% of the population are between 20 and 29 years old. 6,695 people or 13.7% are between 30 and 39, 8,314 people or 17.0% are between 40 and 49, and 6,307 people or 12.9% are between 50 and 59. The senior population distribution is 6,030 people or 12.3% of the population are between 60 and 69 years old, 4,470 people or 9.2% are between 70 and 79, there are 2,974 people or 6.1% who are over 80.

In 2000 there were 12,652 single family homes (or 38.0% of the total) out of a total of 33,338 inhabited buildings. There were 5,081 two family buildings (15.2%) and 11,377 multi-family buildings (34.1%). There were also 4,228 buildings in the district that were multipurpose buildings (used for both housing and commercial or another purpose).

In 2000 there were 22,972 apartments in the district. The most common apartment size was the 4 room apartment of which there were 6,999. There were 970 single room apartments and 5,308 apartments with five or more rooms. Of these apartments, a total of 19,597 apartments (85.3% of the total) were permanently occupied, while 2,003 apartments (8.7%) were seasonally occupied and 1,372 apartments (6.0%) were empty.

The historical population is given in the following table:

year	population
1850	17,372
1880	19,536
1900	24,292
1950	29,077
1980	41,638
1990	43,761
2000	45,724

== Politics ==
In the 2007 federal election the most popular party was the CVP which received 28.56% of the vote. The next three most popular parties were the FDP (26.25%), the SP (17.98%) and the Ticino League (14.28%). In the federal election, a total of 17,043 votes were cast, and the voter turnout was 52.7%.

In the 2007 Ticino Gran Consiglio election, there were a total of 32,293 registered voters in the district of Mendrisio, of which 21,842 or 67.6% voted. 401 blank ballots and 57 null ballots were cast, leaving 21,384 valid ballots in the election. The most popular party was the PLRT which received 5,495 or 25.7% of the vote. The next three most popular parties were; the PPD+GenGiova (with 4,812 or 22.5%), the PS (with 3,480 or 16.3%) and the SSI (with 3,362 or 15.7%).

In the 2007 Ticino Consiglio di Stato election, 301 blank ballots and 103 null ballots were cast, leaving 21,441 valid ballots in the election. The most popular party was the PLRT which received 5,175 or 24.1% of the vote. The next three most popular parties were; the PPD (with 4,764 or 22.2%), the PS (with 3,962 or 18.5%) and the LEGA (with 3,667 or 17.1%).

== Religion ==
From the 2000 census, 38,182 or 83.5% were Roman Catholic, while 1,914 or 4.2% belonged to the Swiss Reformed Church. There are 3,943 individuals (or about 8.62% of the population) who belong to another church (not listed on the census), and 1,685 individuals (or about 3.69% of the population) did not answer the question.

== Education ==
In the Mendrisio District there was a total of 7,465 students (as of 2009). The Ticino education system provides up to three years of non-mandatory kindergarten and in Mendrisio District there were 1,213 children in kindergarten. The primary school program lasts for five years and includes both a standard school and a special school. In the district, 2,188 students attended the standard primary schools and 91 students attended the special school. In the lower secondary school system, students either attend a two-year middle school followed by a two-year pre-apprenticeship or they attend a four-year program to prepare for higher education. There were 1,913 students in the two-year middle school and 24 in their pre-apprenticeship, while 809 students were in the four-year advanced program.

The upper secondary school includes several options, but at the end of the upper secondary program, a student will be prepared to enter a trade or to continue on to a university or college. In Ticino, vocational students may either attend school while working on their internship or apprenticeship (which takes three or four years) or may attend school followed by an internship or apprenticeship (which takes one year as a full-time student or one and a half to two years as a part-time student). There were 500 vocational students who were attending school full-time and 648 who attend part-time.

The professional program lasts three years and prepares a student for a job in engineering, nursing, computer science, business, tourism and similar fields. There were 79 students in the professional program.

== Circles and municipalities ==
The Mendrisio District has 13 municipalities divided in 5 circles (circoli):

* Circle of Mendrisio
Coat of arms	Municipality	Population (31 December 2020)	Area km^{2}
Mendrisio	Mendrisio	14,902	31.77
Coldrerio	Coldrerio	2,867	2.46
	Total	17,769	34.47

Circle of Balerna
Coat of arms	Municipality	Population (31 December 2020)	Area km^{2}
Balerna	Balerna	3,240	2.57
Castel San Pietro	Castel San Pietro	2,194	11.83
Chiasso	Chiasso	7,581	5.33
Morbio Inferiore	Morbio Inferiore	4,441	2.29
	Total	17,456	22.02

Circle of Caneggio
Coat of arms	Municipality	Population (31 December 2020)	Area km^{2}
Vacallo	Vacallo	3,363	1.61
Breggia	Breggia	1,926	25.85
	Total	5,289	27.46

Circle of Stabio
Coat of arms	Municipality	Population (31 December 2020)	Area km^{2}
Stabio	Stabio	4,491	6.15
Novazzano	Novazzano	2,338	5.18
	Total	6,829	11.33

Circle of Riva San Vitale
Coat of arms	Municipality	Population (31 December 2020)	Area km^{2}
Riva San Vitale	Riva San Vitale	2,626	5.97
	Total	2,626	5.97

=== Old municipalities ===
Some municipalities were merged in recent years:

- Genestrerio, Mendrisio, Arzo, Tremona, Rancate and Capolago were merged into Mendrisio in 2009.
- Casima, Castel San Pietro, Monte and the village of Campora (in Caneggio) were merged into Castel San Pietro in 2004
- Salorino and Mendrisio were merged into Mendrisio in 2003.
- Pedrinate and Chiasso were merged into Chiasso in 1975.
- Bruzella, Cabbio, Caneggio, Morbio Superiore, Muggio and Sagno merged into Breggia on 25 October 2009.
- On 14 April 2013 the former municipalities of Besazio, Ligornetto and Meride merged into the municipality of Mendrisio.
