= Muggio =

- Former municipality
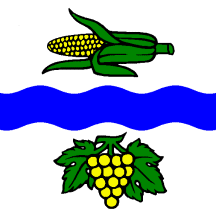
- Flag Coat of arms
- Location of Muggio
- Location within Switzerland Location within Canton of Ticino
- Coordinates: 45°54′N 9°03′E
- Country: Switzerland
- Canton: Ticino
- District: Mendrisio

Government
  - Mayor: Leonello Fontana

Area
  - Total: 8.39 km^{2} (3.24 sq mi)
- Elevation: 661 m (2,169 ft)

Population (December 2004)
  - Total: 224
  - Density: 26.7/km^{2} (69.1/sq mi)
- Time zone: UTC+01:00 (CET)
  - Summer (DST): UTC+02:00 (CEST)
- Postal code: 6838
- SFOS number: 5259
- ISO 3166 code: CH-TI
- Surrounded by: Cabbio, Castel San Pietro, Centro Valle Intelvi (Italy), Cerano d'Intelvi (Italy)
- Website: SFSO statistics

Muggio was a municipality in the district of Mendrisio in the canton of Ticino in Switzerland. On 25 October 2009 the municipalities of Bruzella, Cabbio, Caneggio, Morbio Superiore, Muggio and Sagno merged into the municipality of Breggia.

== History ==
Muggio is first mentioned in 852 as Mugio.

The valley has been inhabited since ancient times and by the 9th century farmers had settled in the village. It was included in the 1299 listing of land owned by Como Cathedral. At that time it was part of the parish of Cabbio. In 1673 it became a vice-parish, which was supported, until the 19th century, by the mother church at Balerna.

The Church of San Lorenzo was first mentioned in 1578. In 1760 it was rebuilt and it was renovated several times, most recently in 2003–04.

The inhabitants lived on agriculture and animal husbandry as well as emigration, especially of artists, to other countries. Several large waves of emigration occurred between 1850 and 1940. Since the 1950s the population has continued to decline.

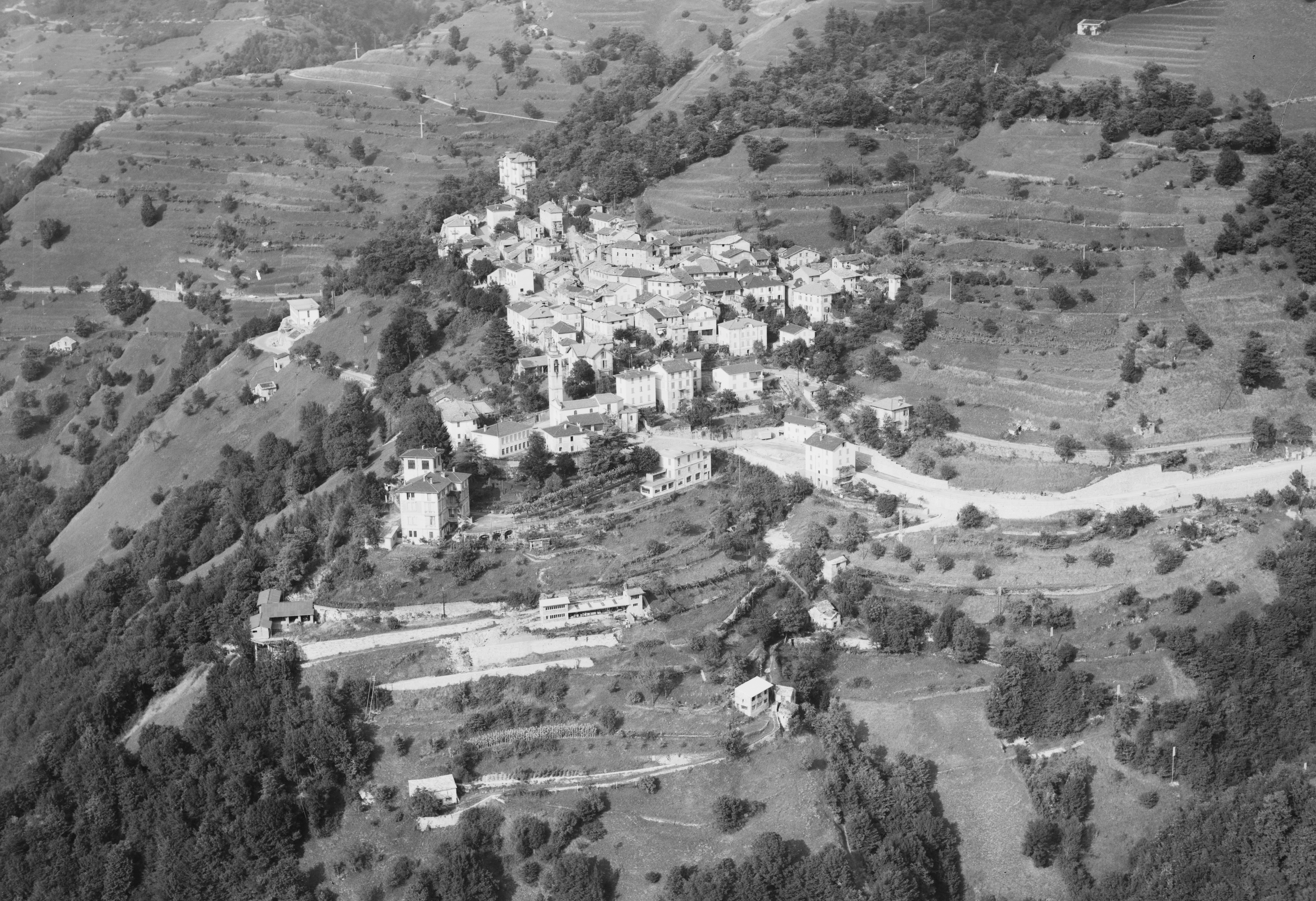
Aerial view (1964)

== Geography ==
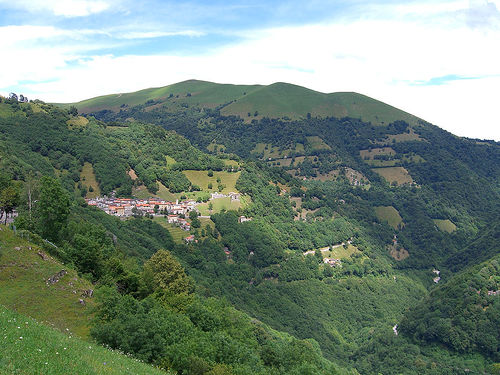
Valle di Muggio

Muggio has an area, as of 1997, of 8.39 square kilometers (3.24 sq mi). Of this area, 0.69 km^{2} (0.27 sq mi) or 8.2% is used for agricultural purposes, while 6.47 km^{2} (2.50 sq mi) or 77.1% is forested. Of the rest of the land, 0.14 km^{2} (35 acres) or 1.7% is settled (buildings or roads), 0.02 km^{2} (4.9 acres) or 0.2% is either rivers or lakes and 0.15 km^{2} (37 acres) or 1.8% is unproductive land.

Of the built up area, housing and buildings made up 1.2% and transportation infrastructure made up 0.5%. Out of the forested land, 73.5% of the total land area is heavily forested and 3.6% is covered with orchards or small clusters of trees. Of the agricultural land, 7.0% is used for growing crops and 1.2% is used for alpine pastures. All the water in the village is flowing water.

The village is located in the Mendrisio district, on the floor of the Muggio valle. It consists of the village of Muggio and the hamlets of Scudellate and Roncapiano. Muggio is around 15 km (9.3 mi) southeast of Lugano, and is around 2 km (1.2 mi) from the Italian border.

== Coat of arms ==
The blazon of the municipal coat of arms is Argent a fess wavy argent between a maize cob or fesswise leaved vert and a bunch of grapes also or slipped and leaved also vert. The wavy stripe symbolizes the river that flows through the valley, while the maize cob and grapes refer to local agriculture.

== Demographics ==
Muggio has a population (As of December 2004) of 224. Of the Swiss national languages (as of 2000), 8 speak German, 2 people speak French, 191 people speak Italian. The remainder (5 people) speak another language.

In 2008 there were 3 live births to Swiss citizens and were 10 deaths of Swiss citizens. Ignoring immigration and emigration, the population of Swiss citizens decreased by 7 while the foreign population remained the same. There were 2 Swiss men and 1 Swiss woman who immigrated back to Switzerland. At the same time, there was 1 non-Swiss man who immigrated from another country to Switzerland. The total Swiss population change in 2008 (from all sources, including moves across municipal borders) was a decrease of 3 and the non-Swiss population remained the same. This represents a population growth rate of -1.4%.

In 2000 there were 142 single-family homes (or 82.1% of the total) out of a total of 173 inhabited buildings. There were 28 multi-family buildings (16.2%), along with 2 multi-purpose buildings that were mostly used for housing (1.2%) and 1 other use buildings (commercial or industrial) that also had some housing (0.6%). Of the single-family homes 5 were built before 1919, while 3 were built between 1990 and 2000. The greatest number of single-family homes (103) were built between 1919 and 1945.

In 2000 there were 210 apartments in the village. The most common apartment size was 4 rooms of which there were 69. There were 8 single room apartments and 59 apartments with five or more rooms. Of these apartments, a total of 101 apartments (48.1% of the total) were permanently occupied, while 108 apartments (51.4%) were seasonally occupied and 1 apartment (0.5%) was empty.

The historical population is given in the following chart:

== Politics ==
In the 2007 federal election the most popular party was the CVP which received 39.77% of the vote. The next three most popular parties were the FDP (22.03%), the SP (20.08%) and the Green Party (7.41%). In the federal election, a total of 66 votes were cast, and the voter turnout was 32.0%.

In the 2007 Gran Consiglio election, there were a total of 214 registered voters in Muggio, of which 116 or 54.2% voted. 2 blank ballots were cast, leaving 114 valid ballots in the election. The most popular party was the PLRT which received 40 or 35.1% of the vote. The next three most popular parties were; the PPD+GenGiova (with 31 or 27.2%), the PS (with 14 or 12.3%) and the LEGA (with 13 or 11.4%).

In the 2007 Consiglio di Stato election, The most popular party was the PLRT which received 38 or 32.8% of the vote. The next three most popular parties were; the PPD (with 32 or 27.6%), the PS (with 15 or 12.9%) and the PS (with 15 or 12.9%).

== Economy ==
There were 85 residents of the village who were employed in some capacity, of which females made up 32.9% of the workforce. In 2008's statistics the total number of full-time equivalent jobs was 21. The number of jobs in the primary sector was 12, all of which were in agriculture. The number of jobs in the secondary sector was 1, of which or (0.0%) were in manufacturing and 1 (100.0%) were in construction. The number of jobs in the tertiary sector was 8. In the tertiary sector; 2 or 25.0% were in the movement and storage of goods, 2 or 25.0% were in a hotel or restaurant and 2 or 25.0% were technical professionals or scientists.

In 2000, there were 6 workers who commuted into the village and 65 workers who commuted away. The village is a net exporter of workers, with about 10.8 workers leaving the village for every one entering.

== Religion ==
From the 2000 census, 165 or 80.1% were Roman Catholic, while 5 or 2.4% belonged to the Swiss Reformed Church. There are 15 individuals (or about 7.28% of the population) who belong to another church (not listed on the census), and 21 individuals (or about 10.19% of the population) did not answer the question.

== Education ==
As of 2000, there were 20 students from Muggio who attended schools outside the village.

== Famous people ==
- Pietro Perti, Baroque sculptor
