= Morbio Superiore =

- Former municipality
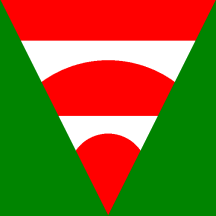
- Flag Coat of arms
- Location of Morbio Superiore
- Location within Switzerland Location within Canton of Ticino
- Coordinates: 45°52′N 9°01′E
- Country: Switzerland
- Canton: Ticino
- District: Mendrisio

Government
  - Mayor: Piermario Croci

Area
  - Total: 2.75 km^{2} (1.06 sq mi)
- Elevation: 452 m (1,483 ft)

Population (December 2004)
  - Total: 705
  - Density: 256/km^{2} (664/sq mi)
- Time zone: UTC+01:00 (CET)
  - Summer (DST): UTC+02:00 (CEST)
- Postal code: 6835
- SFOS number: 5258
- ISO 3166 code: CH-TI
- Surrounded by: Caneggio, Castel San Pietro, Cernobbio (IT-CO), Morbio Inferiore, Sagno
- Website: morbiosuperiore.ch

Morbio Superiore was a municipality in the canton of Ticino in Switzerland in the hills above Chiasso. It is located in the district of Mendrisio. On 25 October 2009 the municipalities of Bruzella, Cabbio, Caneggio, Morbio Superiore, Muggio and Sagno merged into the municipality of Breggia.

== History ==
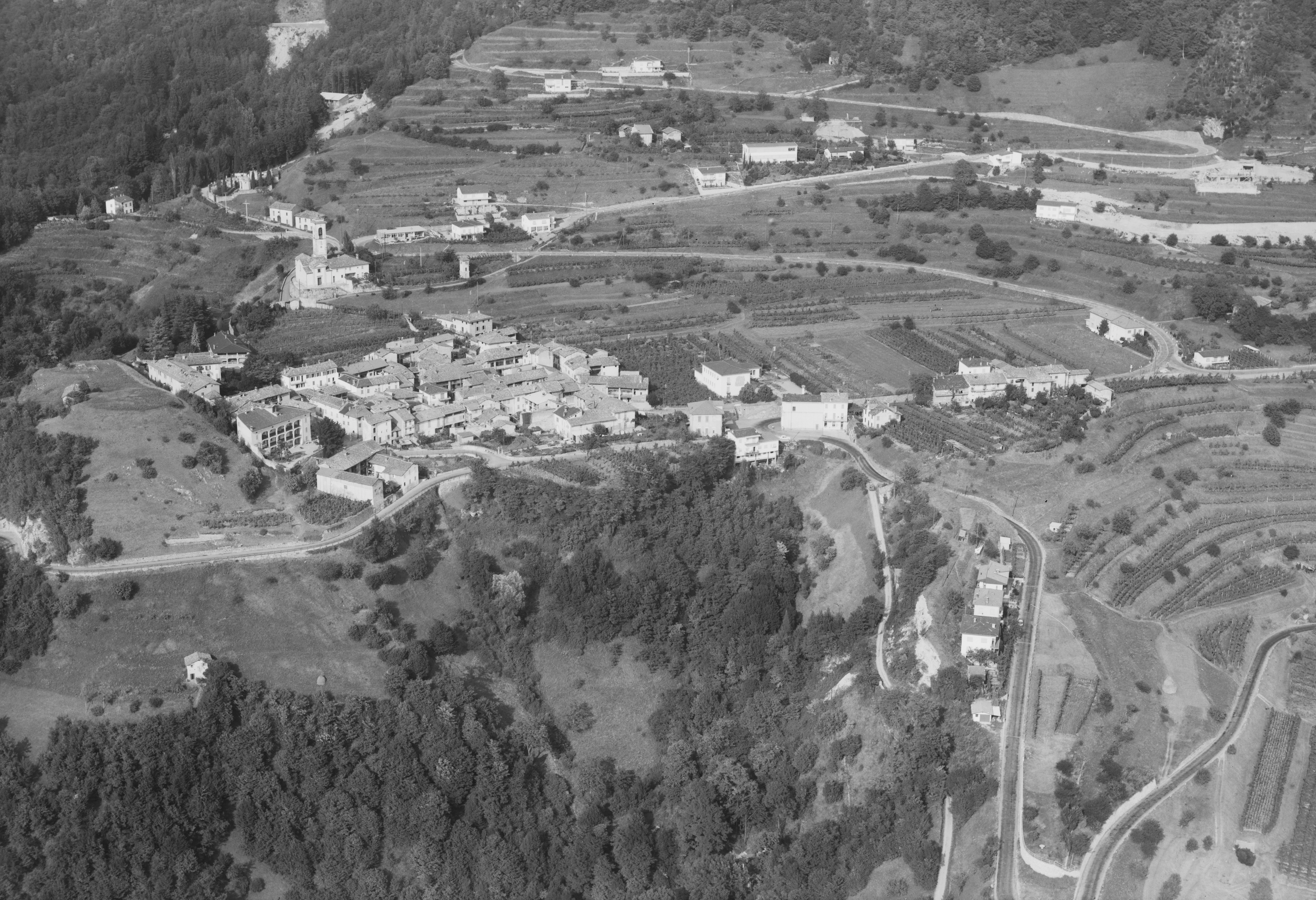
Aerial view (1964)

Morbio Superiore is first mentioned in 1116 as Morbio de Supra. In the Middle Ages (first mentioned in 1299) the village was owned by Como Cathedral and the Benedictine monastery of S. Abbondio in Como. The church of S. Vittore in Balerna also owned property in the village. From 1591 until the 17th century, Morbio and Sagno were a vice parish under the mother church at Balerna. In 1802 Morbio Superiore was a separate parish.

The parish church of S. Giovanni Evangelista was first mentioned in 1227. In the 18th century it was totally rebuilt and then renovated in 1957. The chapel of San Martino, originally an Early Middle Ages romanesque building stands on the site of what might be an Ostrogoth watchtower from the 6th century. The Chapel of S. Anna is from the late Baroque period.

Formerly, the village was surrounded by vineyards, tobacco and mulberry cultivation, of which only the vineyards remain. In the last decades of the 20th century, Morbio Superiore developed into a residential community. Since 1960, Lattecaldo has been the headquarters of the Cantonal Forestry School. In 2000, four-fifths of the workforce worked outside the community.

== Geography ==
Morbio Superiore has an area, as of 1997, of 2.75 square kilometers (1.06 sq mi). Of this area, 0.51 km^{2} (0.20 sq mi) or 18.5% is used for agricultural purposes, while 1.92 km^{2} (0.74 sq mi) or 69.8% is forested. Of the rest of the land, 0.35 km^{2} (0.14 sq mi) or 12.7% is settled (buildings or roads) and 0.02 km^{2} (4.9 acres) or 0.7% is unproductive land.

Of the built up area, housing and buildings made up 10.2% and transportation infrastructure made up 1.8%. Out of the forested land, 66.9% of the total land area is heavily forested and 2.9% is covered with orchards or small clusters of trees. Of the agricultural land, 5.8% is used for growing crops, while 2.5% is used for orchards or vine crops and 10.2% is used for alpine pastures.

The village is located in the Mendrisio district, at the entrance to the Muggio valley on the left side of the valley. It consists of the village of Morbio Superiore and the hamlet of Lattecaldo.

== Coat of arms ==
The blazon of the municipal coat of arms is Gules two bars embowed in base and chause vert. The bars represent the small antique bridge and the new big one.

== Demographics ==
Morbio Superiore has a population (As of December 2004) of 705.

Most of the population (as of 2000) speaks (%), with being second most common (%) and being third (%). Of the Swiss national languages (as of 2000), 50 speak German, 6 people speak French, 632 people speak Italian. The remainder (12 people) speak another language.

In 2008 there was 1 live birth to Swiss citizens and were 2 deaths of Swiss citizens. Ignoring immigration and emigration, the population of Swiss citizens decreased by 1 while the foreign population remained the same. There was 1 Swiss man and 1 Swiss woman who emigrated from Switzerland. At the same time, there was 1 non-Swiss man who emigrated from Switzerland to another country and 1 non-Swiss woman who immigrated from another country to Switzerland. The total Swiss population change in 2008 (from all sources, including moves across municipal borders) was a decrease of 9 and the non-Swiss population change was an increase of 6 people. This represents a population growth rate of -0.4%.

In 2000 there were 175 single family homes (or 77.1% of the total) out of a total of 227 inhabited buildings. There were 44 multi-family buildings (19.4%), along with 1 multi-purpose buildings that were mostly used for housing (0.4%) and 7 other use buildings (commercial or industrial) that also had some housing (3.1%). Of the single family homes 4 were built before 1919, while 19 were built between 1990 and 2000. The greatest number of single family homes (44) were built between 1919 and 1945.

In 2000 there were 297 apartments in the village. The most common apartment size was 4 rooms of which there were 84. There were 9 single room apartments and 133 apartments with five or more rooms. Of these apartments, a total of 269 apartments (90.6% of the total) were permanently occupied, while 26 apartments (8.8%) were seasonally occupied and 2 apartments (0.7%) were empty.

The historical population is given in the following chart:

== Politics ==
In the 2007 federal election the most popular party was the CVP which received 33.07% of the vote. The next three most popular parties were the FDP (25.7%), the SP (20.04%) and the Ticino League (11.11%). In the federal election, a total of 313 votes were cast, and the voter turnout was 60.2%.

In the 2007 Gran Consiglio election, there were a total of 525 registered voters in Morbio Superiore, of which 382 or 72.8% voted. 2 blank ballots and 1 null ballot were cast, leaving 379 valid ballots in the election. The most popular party was the PPD+GenGiova which received 106 or 28.0% of the vote. The next three most popular parties were; the PLRT (with 76 or 20.1%), the PS (with 63 or 16.6%) and the SSI (with 62 or 16.4%).

In the 2007 Consiglio di Stato election, 3 blank ballots and 1 null ballot were cast, leaving 378 valid ballots in the election. The most popular party was the PPD which received 107 or 28.3% of the vote. The next three most popular parties were; the PLRT (with 72 or 19.0%), the PS (with 71 or 18.8%) and the LEGA (with 70 or 18.5%).

== Economy ==
There were 322 residents of the village who were employed in some capacity, of which females made up 37.3% of the workforce.

In 2008's statistics the total number of full-time equivalent jobs was 62. The number of jobs in the primary sector was 3, all of which were in agriculture. The number of jobs in the secondary sector was 13, of which 12 or (92.3%) were in manufacturing and 1 (7.7%) was in construction. The number of jobs in the tertiary sector was 46. In the tertiary sector; 4 or 8.7% were in the sale or repair of motor vehicles, 3 or 6.5% were in the movement and storage of goods, 4 or 8.7% were in a hotel or restaurant, 3 or 6.5% were technical professionals or scientists, 8 or 17.4% were in education.

In 2000, there were 47 workers who commuted into the village and 273 workers who commuted away. The village is a net exporter of workers, with about 5.8 workers leaving the village for every one entering. About 12.8% of the workforce coming into Morbio Superiore are coming from outside Switzerland, while 0.4% of the locals commute out of Switzerland for work.

== Religion ==
From the 2000 census, 586 or 83.7% were Roman Catholic, while 35 or 5.0% belonged to the Swiss Reformed Church. There are 45 individuals (or about 6.43% of the population) who belong to another church (not listed on the census), and 34 individuals (or about 4.86% of the population) did not answer the question.

== Weather ==
Morbio Superiore has an average of 100.6 days of rain or snow per year and on average receives 1,568 mm (61.7 in) of precipitation. The wettest month is May during which time Morbio Superiore receives an average of 199 mm (7.8 in) of rain or snow. During this month there is precipitation for an average of 12.9 days. The driest month of the year is December with an average of 72 mm (2.8 in) of precipitation over 5.7 days.

== Education ==
As of 2000, there were 51 students in Morbio Superiore who came from another village, while 63 residents attended schools outside the village.
