= Sagno =

- Former municipality
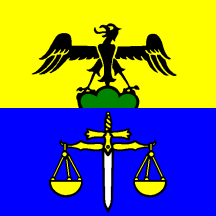
- Flag Coat of arms
- Location of Sagno
- Location within Switzerland Location within Canton of Ticino
- Coordinates: 45°51′N 9°02′E
- Country: Switzerland
- Canton: Ticino
- District: Mendrisio

Government
  - Mayor: Giuseppe Tettamanti

Area
  - Total: 1.68 km^{2} (0.65 sq mi)
- Elevation: 704 m (2,310 ft)

Population (December 2004)
  - Total: 271
  - Density: 161/km^{2} (418/sq mi)
- Time zone: UTC+01:00 (CET)
  - Summer (DST): UTC+02:00 (CEST)
- Postal code: 6839
- SFOS number: 5264
- ISO 3166 code: CH-TI
- Surrounded by: Cernobbio (IT-CO), Morbio Inferiore, Morbio Superiore, Vacallo
- Website: sagno.valledimuggio.ch/

Sagno is a former municipality in the district of Mendrisio in the canton of Ticino in Switzerland; it is now part of the new municipality of Breggia. On 25 October 2009 the municipalities of Bruzella, Cabbio, Caneggio, Morbio Superiore, Muggio, Sagno merged into Breggia.

== History ==
Sagno is first mentioned around 1296–99 as Sagnio.

Scattered finds from the Bronze Age suggest that the valley was settled prehistorically. During the Middle Ages it was part of the Pieve of Balerna. Together with Morbio Superiore it formed a vice-parish, which depended on the mother church at Balerna. They broke away in the 17th century and in 1802 became an independent parish.

The parish church of San Michele Arcangelo was first mentioned in 1330, but is of much older origin. In 1789–99 it was rebuilt in the Classicist style and it was renovated in 1982–83.

In 1843, near Mount Bisbino, a violent political conflict, the so-called Fatti del Bisbino broke out. Throughout Ticino in the 1830s and 1840s, there had been a conflict between the conservative, catholic side and the liberals. Following a religious celebration at Monte Bisbino, on 2 July 1843 a troupe of about 20 people were heading home, amusing themselves with singing. A group of radicals encountered the troupe and an argument broke out. A priest was wounded, and several members of the liberal group; Briester Bernasconi, one of his servants and Charles Casartelli, were killed. Reprisals for the attack led to the deaths of the Bruzella pastor, Father Michael Cereghetti, and the baker Antonio Ferrari.

Agriculture and livestock constitute the main long-term sources of income. This was supplemented, by a seasonal migration, especially of bricklayers and stonemasons from Italy. Starting in the 1970s, the population increased slightly. In 2000 about four-fifths of the working population of Sagno were commuters, mostly to Chiasso.

== Geography ==
Sagno has an area, as of 1997, of 1.68 square kilometers (0.65 sq mi). Of this area, 0.23 km^{2} (0.089 sq mi) or 13.7% is used for agricultural purposes, while 1.32 km^{2} (0.51 sq mi) or 78.6% is forested. Of the rest of the land, 0.15 km^{2} (37 acres) or 8.9% is settled (buildings or roads).

Of the built up area, housing and buildings made up 7.1% and transportation infrastructure made up 1.8%. Out of the forested land, 74.4% of the total land area is heavily forested and 4.2% is covered with orchards or small clusters of trees. Of the agricultural land, 6.0% is used for growing crops and 7.1% is used for alpine pastures.

The village is located in the Mendrisio district, on the slopes of Monte Bisbino along the left side of the Muggio valley. It consists of the village of Sagno and the hamlet of Trevalle.

== Demographics ==
Sagno has a population (As of December 2004) of 271.

Of the Swiss national languages (as of 2000), 24 speak German, 208 people speak Italian, and 1 person speaks Romansh. The remainder (5 people) speak another language.

In 2008 there were 3 live births to Swiss citizens and were 2 deaths of Swiss citizens. Ignoring immigration and emigration, the population of Swiss citizens increased by 1 while the foreign population remained the same. The total Swiss population change in 2008 (from all sources, including moves across municipal borders) was an increase of 9 and the non-Swiss population change was an increase of 5 people. This represents a population growth rate of 4.8%.

In 2000 there were 112 single-family homes (or 84.8% of the total) out of a total of 132 inhabited buildings. There were 11 multi-family buildings (8.3%), along with 3 multi-purpose buildings that were mostly used for housing (2.3%) and 6 other use buildings (commercial or industrial) that also had some housing (4.5%). Of the single-family homes 4 were built before 1919, while 9 were built between 1990 and 2000. The greatest number of single-family homes (33) were built between 1919 and 1945.

In 2000 there were 147 apartments in the village. The most common apartment size was 4 rooms of which there were 38. There were 11 single room apartments and 55 apartments with five or more rooms. Of these apartments, a total of 108 apartments (73.5% of the total) were permanently occupied, while 39 apartments (26.5%) were seasonally occupied.

The historical population is given in the following chart:

== Politics ==
In the 2007 federal election the most popular party was the FDP which received 33.27% of the vote. The next three most popular parties were the CVP (28.86%), the SP (14.57%) and the Ticino League (7.38%). In the federal election, a total of 139 votes were cast, and the voter turnout was 58.4%.

In the 2007 Gran Consiglio election, there were a total of 206 registered voters in Sagno, of which 170 or 82.5% voted. 4 blank ballots were cast, leaving 166 valid ballots in the election. The most popular party was the PLRT which received 49 or 29.5% of the vote. The next three most popular parties were; the PPD+GenGiova (with 41 or 24.7%), the SSI (with 27 or 16.3%) and the PS (with 20 or 12.0%).

In the 2007 Consiglio di Stato election, 1 blank ballot was cast, leaving 169 valid ballots in the election. The most popular party was the PLRT which received 53 or 31.4% of the vote. The next three most popular parties were; the PPD (with 40 or 23.7%), the PS (with 26 or 15.4%) and the PS (with 26 or 15.4%).

== Economy ==
There were 118 residents of the village who were employed in some capacity, of which females made up 34.7% of the workforce. In 2008's statistics the total number of full-time equivalent jobs was 18. The number of jobs in the primary sector was 3, all of which were in agriculture. The number of jobs in the secondary sector was 1, of which or (0.0%) were in manufacturing and 1 (100.0%) were in construction. The number of jobs in the tertiary sector was 14. In the tertiary sector; 3 or 21.4% were in the sale or repair of motor vehicles, 3 or 21.4% were in a hotel or restaurant, 1 or 7.1% were in the information industry, 2 or 14.3% were technical professionals or scientists.

In 2000, there were 11 workers who commuted into the village and 95 workers who commuted away. The village is a net exporter of workers, with about 8.6 workers leaving the village for every one entering.

== Religion ==
From the 2000 census, 190 or 79.8% were Roman Catholic, while 15 or 6.3% belonged to the Swiss Reformed Church. There are 22 individuals (or about 9.24% of the population) who belong to another church (not listed on the census), and 11 individuals (or about 4.62% of the population) did not answer the question.

== Education ==
As of 2000, there were 20 students from Sagno who attended schools outside the village.
