= Bruzella =

- Former municipality
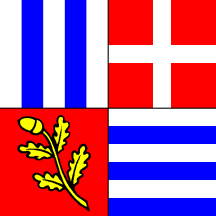
- Flag Coat of arms
- Location of Bruzella
- Location within Switzerland Location within Canton of Ticino
- Coordinates: 45°53′N 9°02′E
- Country: Switzerland
- Canton: Ticino
- District: Mendrisio

Government
  - Mayor: Luca Cavadini

Area
  - Total: 3.44 km^{2} (1.33 sq mi)
- Elevation: 593 m (1,946 ft)

Population (December 2004)
  - Total: 185
  - Density: 53.8/km^{2} (139/sq mi)
- Time zone: UTC+01:00 (CET)
  - Summer (DST): UTC+02:00 (CEST)
- Postal code: 6837
- SFOS number: 5244
- ISO 3166 code: CH-TI
- Surrounded by: Cabbio, Caneggio, Castel San Pietro, Moltrasio (IT-CO), Schignano (IT-CO)
- Website: SFSO statistics

Bruzella was a municipality in the district of Mendrisio in the canton of Ticino in Switzerland. On 25 October 2009 the municipalities of Bruzella, Cabbio, Caneggio, Morbio Superiore, Muggio and Sagno merged into the municipality of Breggia.

== History ==
Bruzella is first mentioned in 852 as Brusella. Until 1609 it was united territorially with Monte and until 1649 it was part of the parish of Caneggio. The Church of S. Siro is first mentioned in 1579. It was rebuilt in the 18th century, and restored in 1973.

Traditionally, cheese production and forestry (production of timber and charcoal) were the main economic sources. This was supplemented by periodic waves of emigration. By 1985, agriculture only employed six people. At the beginning of the 21st century, the population was largely made of retirees and commuters.

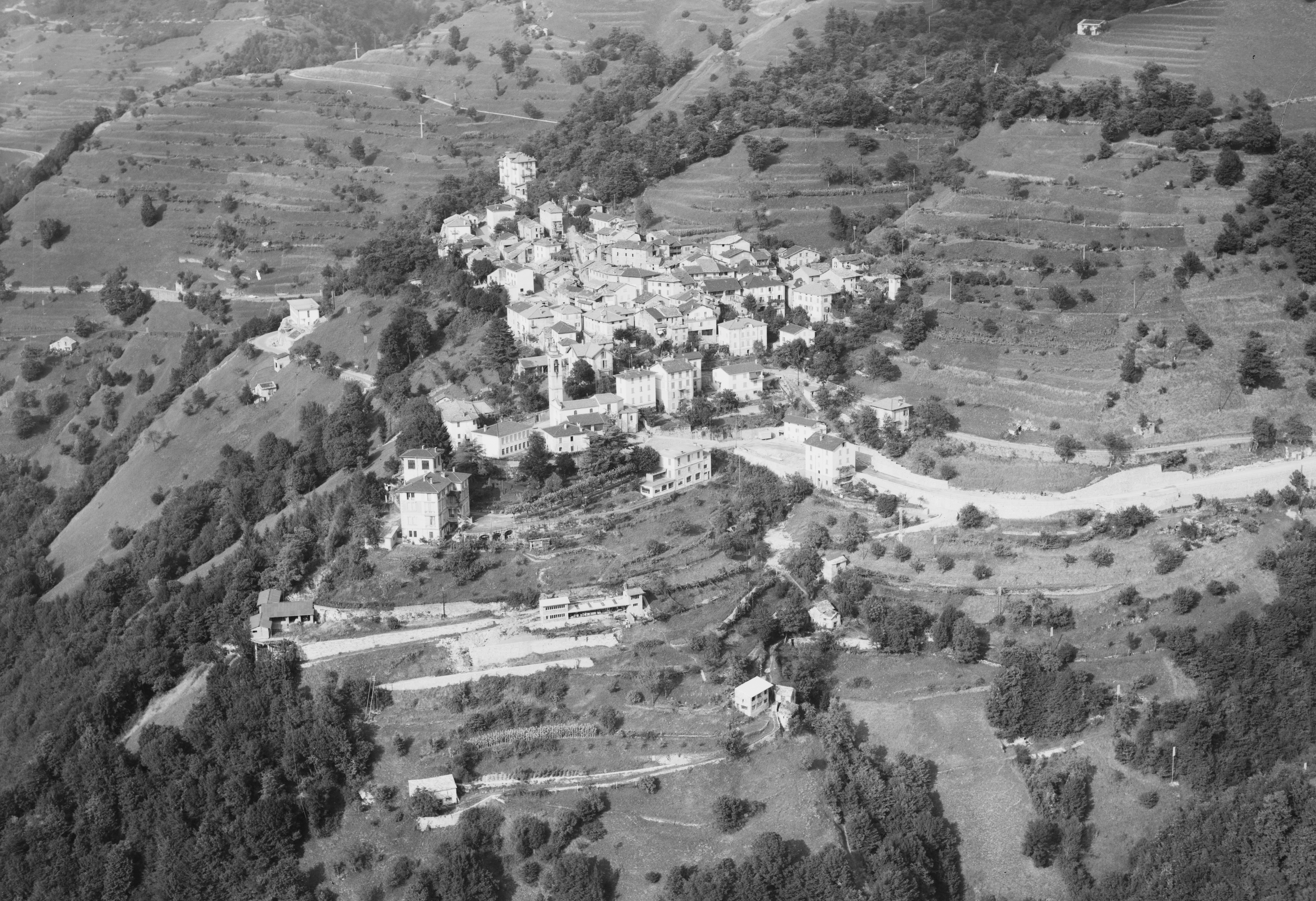
Aerial view (1964)

== Coat of arms ==
The blazon of the municipal coat of arms is Quartered: 1st Argent two pales azure, 2nd Gules a cross argent, 3rd Gules an oak branch with an acorn or in bend and 4th Bendy of six argent and azure.

== Geography ==
Bruzella has an area, as of 1997, of 3.44 square kilometers (1.33 sq mi). Of this area, 0.35 km^{2} (0.14 sq mi) or 10.2% is used for agricultural purposes, while 3 km^{2} (1.2 sq mi) or 87.2% is forested. Of the rest of the land, 0.06 km^{2} (15 acres) or 1.7% is settled (buildings or roads) and 0.03 km^{2} (7.4 acres) or 0.9% is unproductive land.

Of the built up area, housing and buildings made up 0.6% and transportation infrastructure made up 1.2%. Out of the forested land, 83.4% of the total land area is heavily forested and 3.8% is covered with orchards or small clusters of trees. Of the agricultural land, 9.6% is used for growing crops.

The village is located in the Mendrisio district on a terrace along the left side of the Valle di Muggio

== Demographics ==
Bruzella has a population (As of December 2004) of 185.

In 2008 there was 1 live birth to Swiss citizens and 1 death of a Swiss citizen. Ignoring immigration and emigration, the population of Swiss citizens remained the same while the foreign population remained the same. There was 1 Swiss man who immigrated back to Switzerland. At the same time, there was 1 non-Swiss man who emigrated from Switzerland to another country. The total Swiss population change in 2008 (from all sources, including moves across municipal borders) was a decrease of 0 and the non-Swiss population change was a decrease of 4 people. This represents a population growth rate of -2.2%.

Of the Swiss national languages (as of 2000), 13 speak German, 2 people speak French, 164 people speak Italian. The remainder (4 people) speak another language.

== Notable people ==
- Giovanni Pietro Magni (1655 – 1722 or 1724) a German stuccoist born in Bruzella. He decorated many buildings across central Germany in the late 1600s and early 1700s, particularly under the patronage of the Prince-Bishop of Würzburg

== Historic population ==
The historical population is given in the following chart:

== Politics ==
In the 2007 federal election the most popular party was the FDP which received 37.66% of the vote. The next three most popular parties were the CVP (26.13%), the SP (24.67%) and the Green Party (5.69%). In the federal election, a total of 89 votes were cast, and the voter turnout was 57.8%.

In the 2007 Gran Consiglio election, there were a total of 155 registered voters in Bruzella, of which 120 or 77.4% voted. 2 blank ballots were cast, leaving 118 valid ballots in the election. The most popular party was the PLRT which received 51 or 43.2% of the vote. The next three most popular parties were; the PPD+GenGiova (with 21 or 17.8%), the PS (with 20 or 16.9%) and the SSI (with 17 or 14.4%).

In the 2007 Consiglio di Stato election, 3 blank ballots were cast, leaving 117 valid ballots in the election. The most popular party was the PLRT which received 47 or 40.2% of the vote. The next three most popular parties were; the PPD (with 23 or 19.7%), the PS (with 21 or 17.9%) and the SSI (with 17 or 14.5%).

== Education ==
As of 2000, there were 29 students from Bruzella who attended schools outside the village.

== Economy ==
There were 88 residents of the village who were employed in some capacity, of which females made up 38.6% of the workforce. In 2000, there were 79 workers who commuted away from the village.

== Religion ==
From the 2000 census, 152 or 83.1% were Roman Catholic, while 10 or 5.5% belonged to the Swiss Reformed Church. There are 20 individuals (or about 10.93% of the population) who belong to another church (not listed on the census), and 1 individuals (or about 0.55% of the population) did not answer the question.

== Housing ==
In 2000 there were 71 single-family homes (or 80.7% of the total) out of a total of 88 inhabited buildings. There were 15 multi-family buildings (17.0%), along with multi-purpose buildings that were mostly used for housing (0.0%) and 2 other use buildings (commercial or industrial) that also had some housing (2.3%). Of the single-family homes 3 were built before 1919, while 2 were built between 1990 and 2000. The greatest number of single-family homes (42) were built between 1919 and 1945. In 2000 there were 106 apartments in the village. The most common apartment size was 4 rooms of which there were 35. There were 2 single room apartments and 44 apartments with five or more rooms. Of these apartments, a total of 74 apartments (69.8% of the total) were permanently occupied, while 29 apartments (27.4%) were seasonally occupied and 3 apartments (2.8%) were empty.

== Weather ==
Bruzella has an average of 104.4 days of rain or snow per year and on average receives 1,680 mm (66 in) of precipitation. The wettest month is May during which time Bruzella receives an average of 213 mm (8.4 in) of rain or snow. During this month there is precipitation for an average of 13.1 days. The driest month of the year is December with an average of 74 mm (2.9 in) of precipitation over 5.8 days.
