= Breggia (river) =

River in Italy and Switzerland

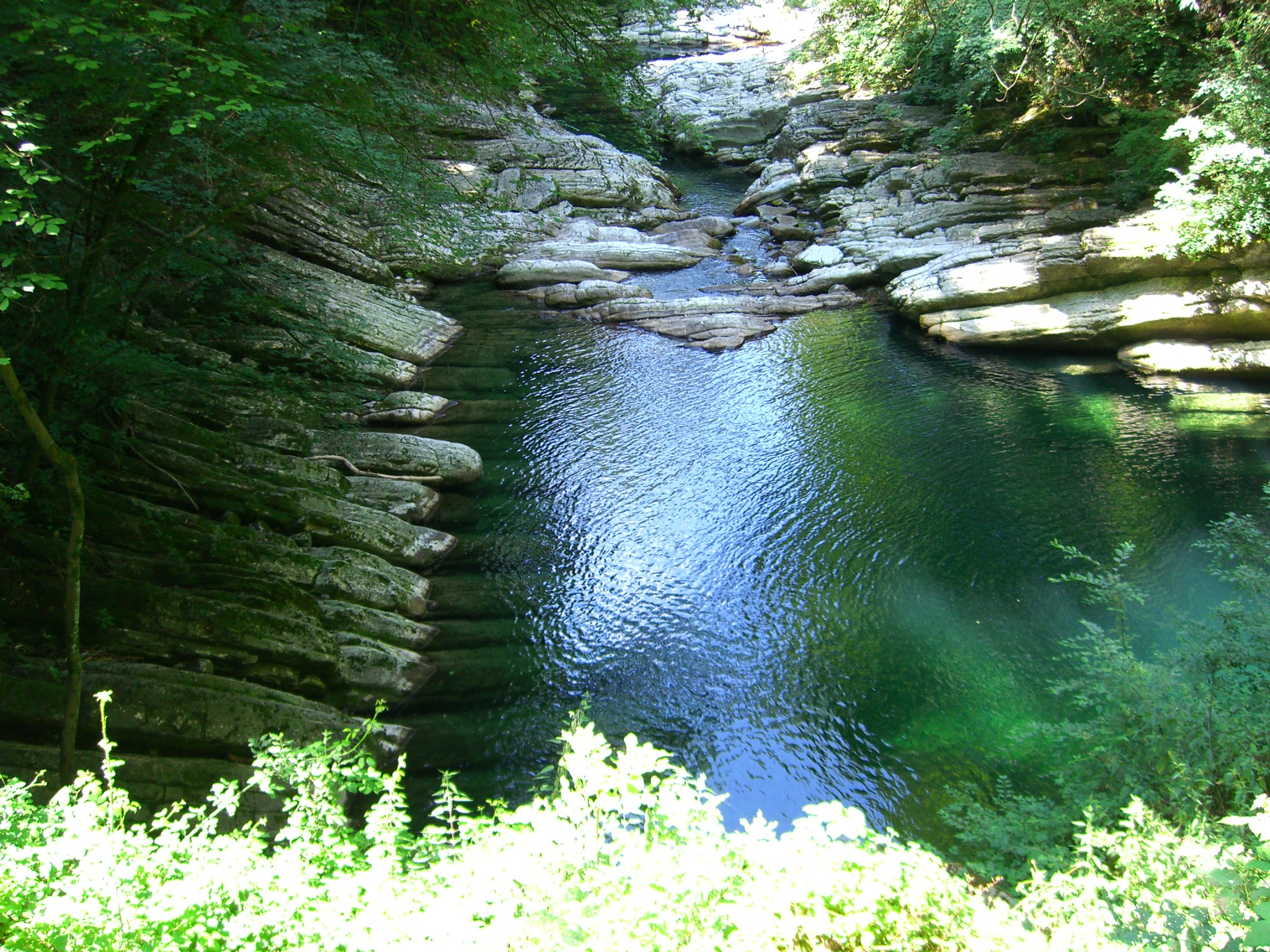
- The Breggia at Morbio Inferiore

Location
- Country: Switzerland, Italy

Physical characteristics
- Mouth: Lake Como
  - coordinates: 45°50′02″N 9°04′34″E

Basin features
- Progression: Lake Como→ Adda→ Po→ Adriatic Sea

Breggia is a Swiss-Italian river. The source are around the Monte Generoso and Monte d'Orimento in the Val d'Intelvi at an elevation of 1,389 metres (4,557 ft). It enters Swiss territory between Erbonne and Scudellate, and flows along the Muggio Valley until Chiasso/Vacallo, where it again enters Italian territory, in Maslianico. Breggia then drains into Lake Como, near Villa Erba between Como and Cernobbio at an elevation of 198 metres (650 ft).
