= Morbio Inferiore =

- Municipality
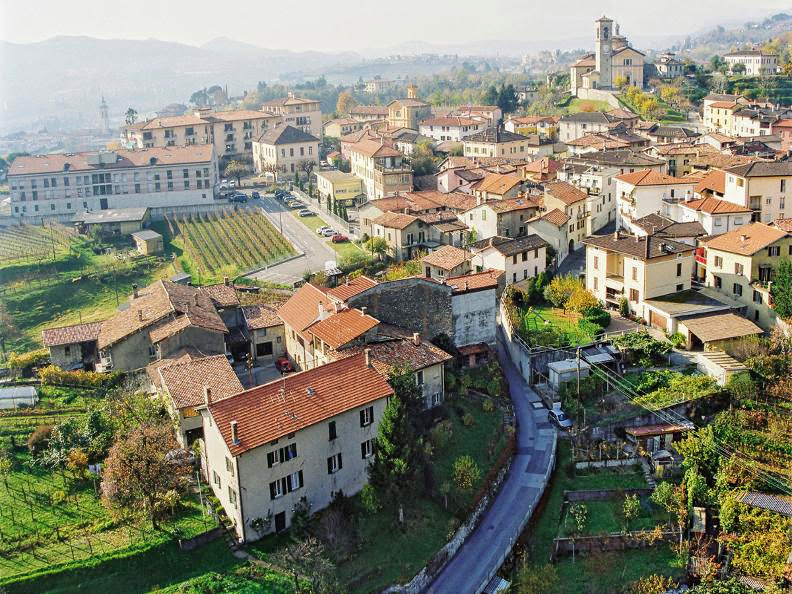

- Flag Coat of arms
- Location of Morbio Inferiore
- Location within Switzerland Location within Canton of Ticino
- Coordinates: 45°51′N 9°01′E
- Country: Switzerland
- Canton: Ticino
- District: Mendrisio

Government
  - Mayor: Sindaco; Claudia Canova CVP/PDC/PPD (as of 2012)

Area
  - Total: 2.29 km^{2} (0.88 sq mi)
- Elevation: 342 m (1,122 ft)

Population (2005)
  - Total: 4,284
  - Density: 1,870/km^{2} (4,850/sq mi)
- Time zone: UTC+01:00 (CET)
  - Summer (DST): UTC+02:00 (CEST)
- Postal code: 6834, 6836
- SFOS number: 5257
- ISO 3166 code: CH-TI
- Surrounded by: Balerna, Castel San Pietro, Chiasso, Morbio Superiore, Sagno, Vacallo
- Website: morbioinf.ch

Morbio Inferiore is a municipality in the canton of Ticino in Switzerland in the hills above Chiasso. It is located in the district of Mendrisio.

== History ==
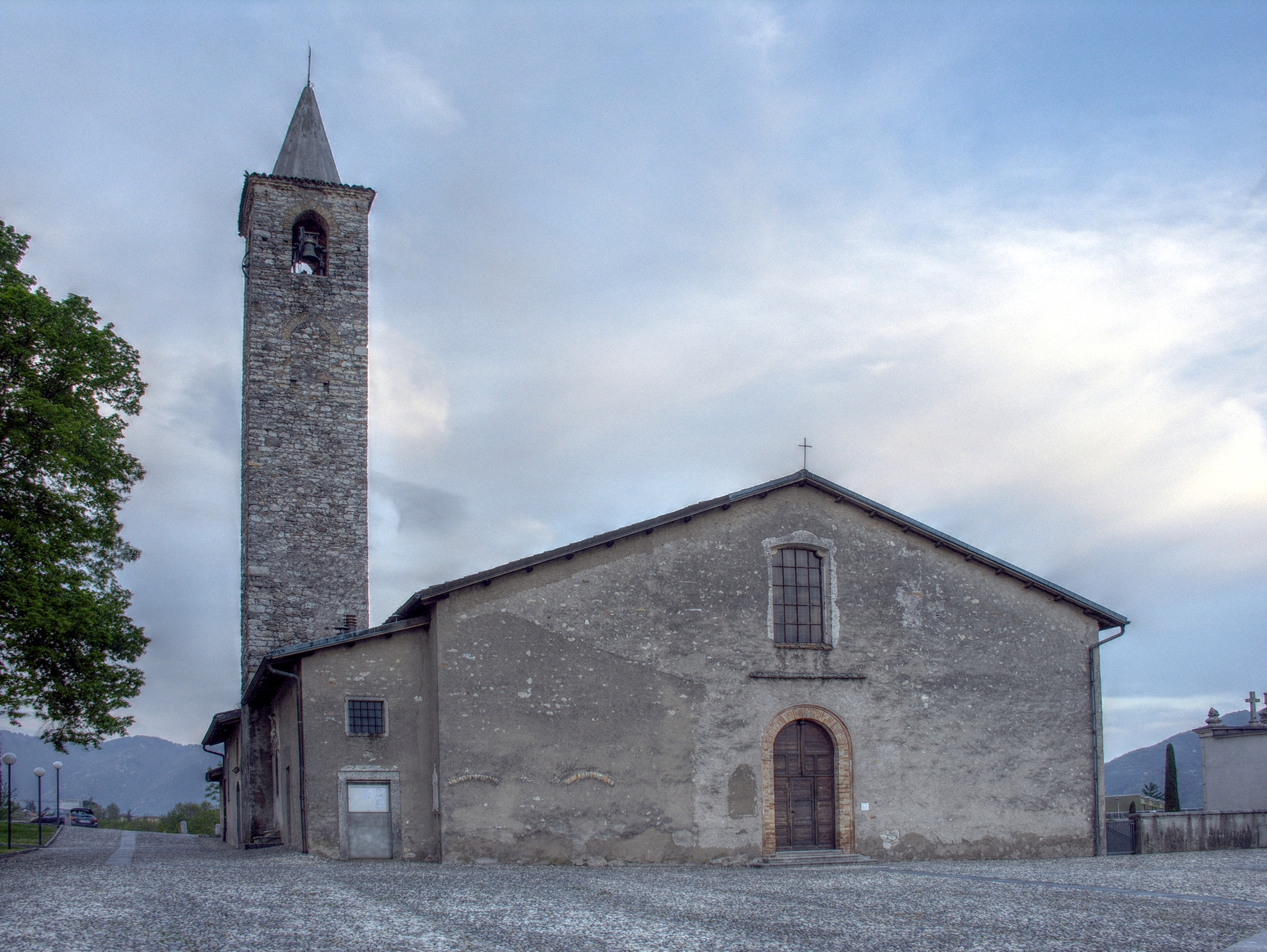
The church of San Giorgio, built in 1309

Morbio Inferiore is first mentioned in 1148 as Morbio Subteriori. In 1198 it was mentioned as Morbio inferiori.

The area near Morbio Inferiore was inhabited during the Roman era, the remains of which include tombs, the ruins of a villa and some Roman baths. During the Middle Ages the village belonged to Pieve of Balerna. A castle was built above the village in 1198, probably on the site of an older fort. Between 1467 and 1468 the town of Mendrisio fought the Duke of Milan for the possession of Morbio. It was awarded to Mendrisio and then subsequently sold. In 1473 it was pawned by the Duke of Milan to Pietro da Oli and again in 1482 to Roberto Sanseverino. Early in the 16th century it came to the Trivulzio family, who sold it to the Swiss Confederation. The Swiss destroyed the entire castle, except for the chapel, in 1517.

On the castle's foundations, the church of Santa Maria dei Miracoli was built some time after 1595. The church was consecrated in 1613 and elevated in 1776 to a parish church, when Morbio separated from the parish of Balerna. The parish church was renovated in 1974 and again in 1999–2001. The church of San Giorgio, which was part of the vice parish until 1713, was built in 1309 and restored in 1975–78. The Chapel of San Rocco was first mentioned in 1578. It was totally rebuilt in 1760 and renovated in 1985.

Traditionally, the municipal economy was based on viticulture, the cultivation of mulberry trees and maize. In the 20th century, the population and economy changed when large bakery, brewery, cement factory and later the textile and watchmaking industries moved into the municipality. In 2000 three-quarters of the population worked outside the community. In 2001, the Parco delle Gole della naturale (Natural Park) was inaugurated along the Breggia river.

== Geography ==
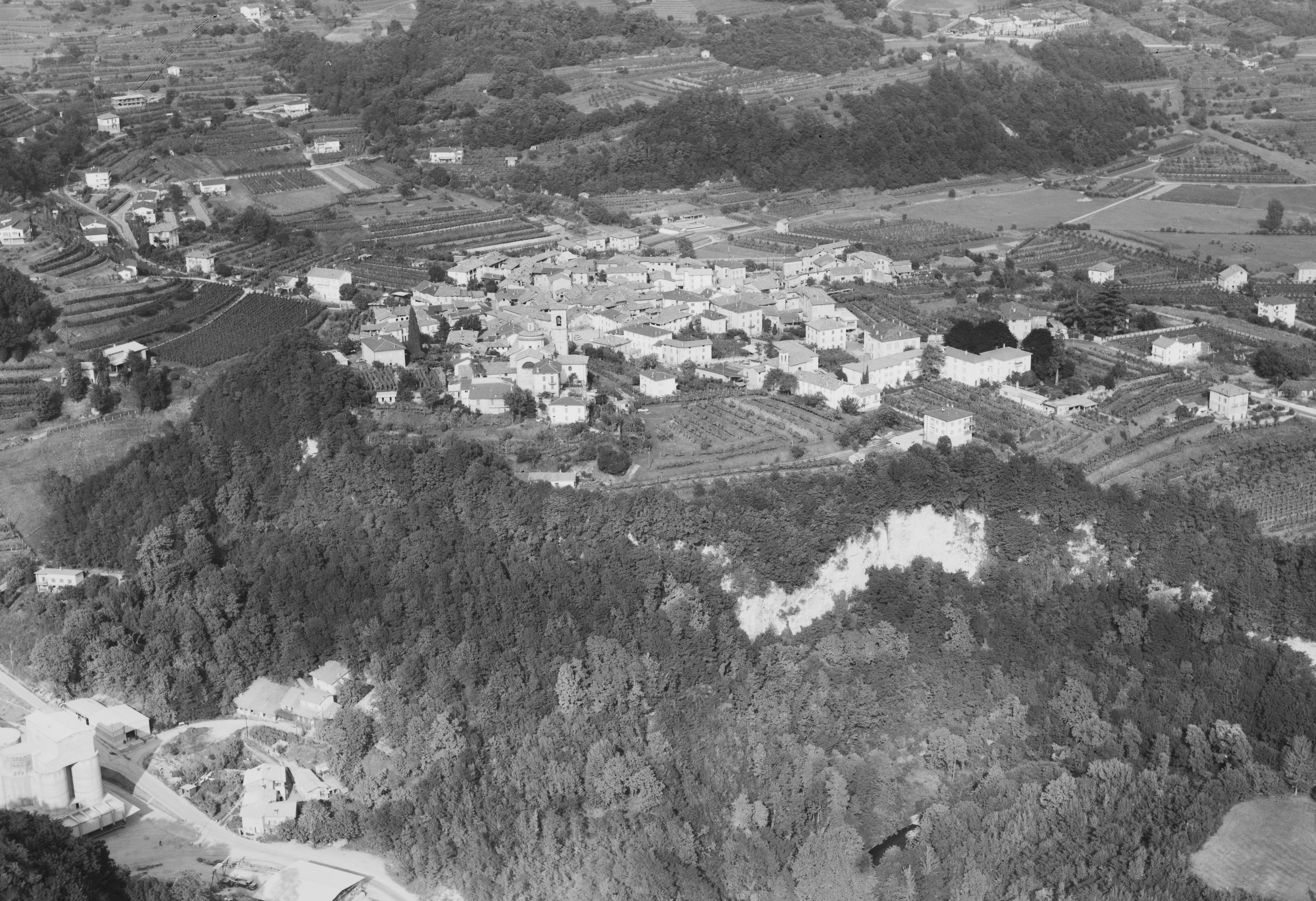
Aerial view (1964)

Morbio Inferiore has an area, as of 1997, of 2.29 square kilometers (0.88 sq mi). Of this area, 1.27 km^{2} (0.49 sq mi) or 55.5% is used for agricultural purposes, while 0.54 km^{2} (0.21 sq mi) or 23.6% is forested. Of the rest of the land, 1.11 km^{2} (0.43 sq mi) or 48.5% is settled (buildings or roads), 0.06 km^{2} (15 acres) or 2.6% is either rivers or lakes and 0.05 km^{2} (12 acres) or 2.2% is unproductive land.

Of the built up area, industrial buildings made up 2.6% of the total area while housing and buildings made up 31.4% and transportation infrastructure made up 10.0%. Power and water infrastructure as well as other special developed areas made up 1.7% of the area while parks, green belts and sports fields made up 2.6%. Out of the forested land, 16.2% of the total land area is heavily forested and 7.4% is covered with orchards or small clusters of trees. Of the agricultural land, 15.7% is used for growing crops, while 8.3% is used for orchards or vine crops and 31.4% is used for alpine pastures. All the water in the municipality is flowing water.

The municipality is located in the Mendrisio district. It consists of the haufendorf village (an irregular, unplanned and quite closely packed village, built around a central square) of Morbio Inferiore.

== Coat of arms ==
The blazon of the municipal coat of arms is Per pale gules and argent overall a castle with two towers counterchanged.

== Demographics ==
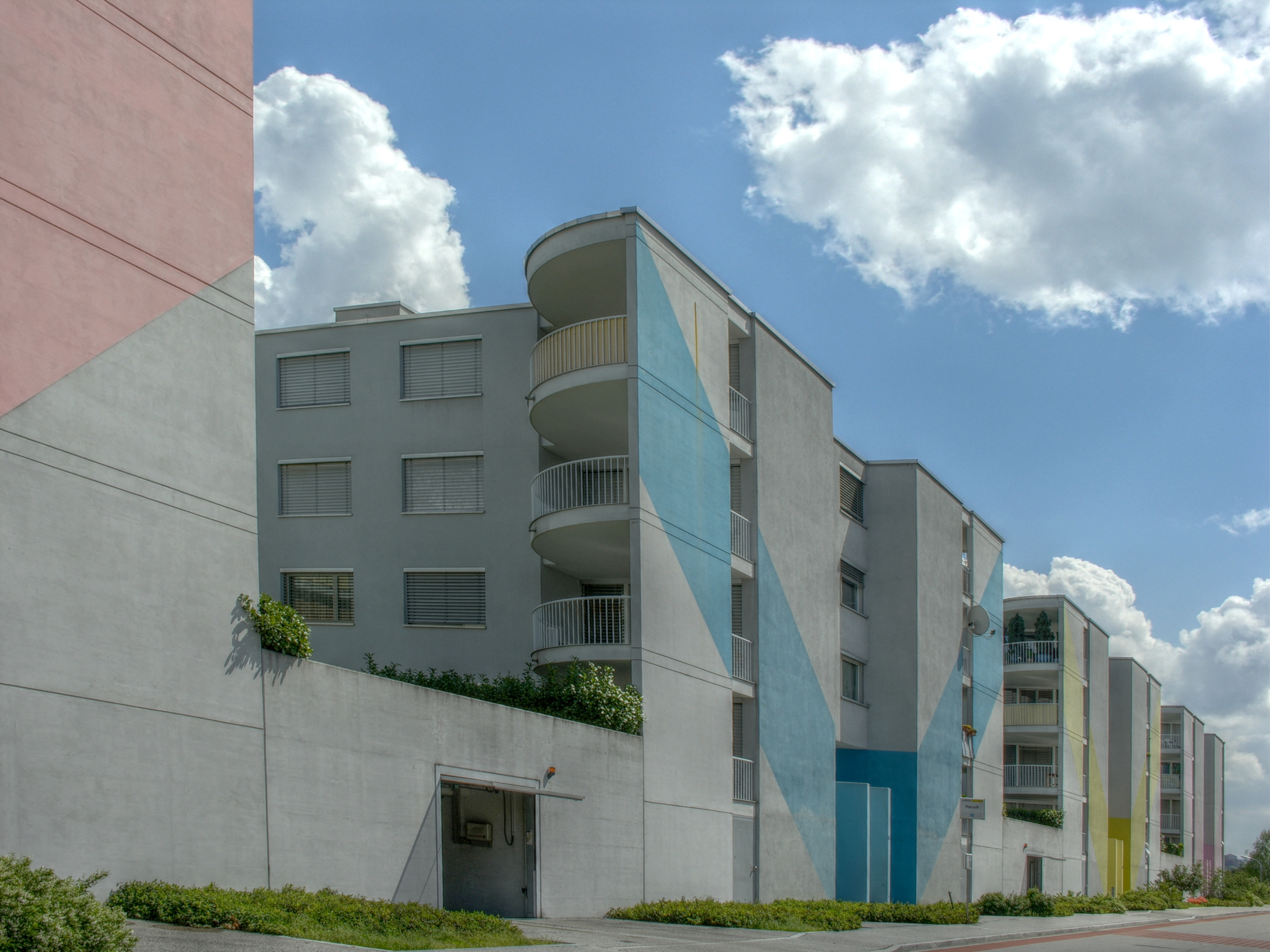
Modern Apartments on Via Pascuritt in Morbio Inferiore

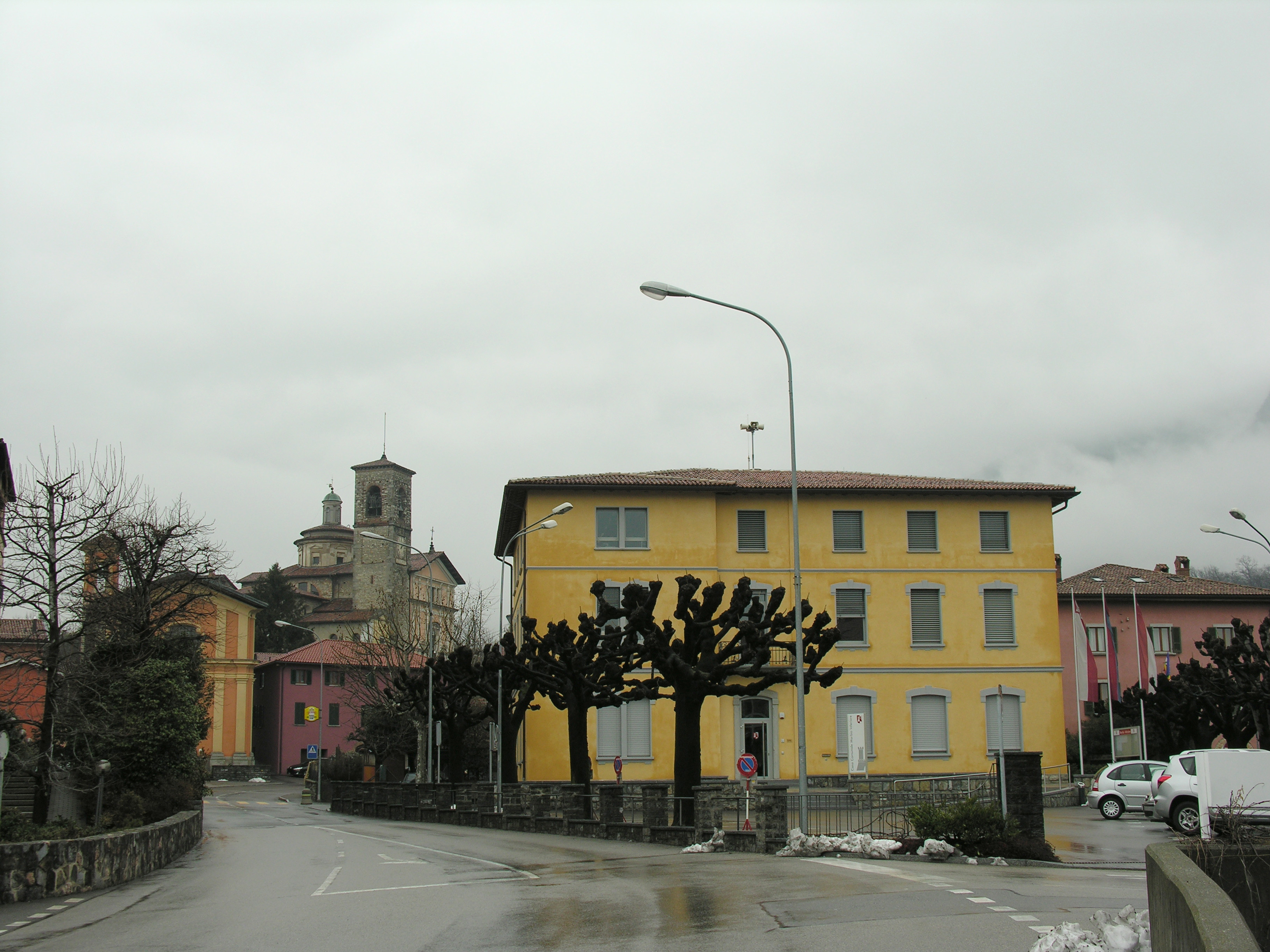
Town center

Morbio Inferiore has a population (as of December 2020) of 4,441. As of 2008, 22.1% of the population are resident foreign nationals. Over the last 10 years (1997–2007) the population has changed at a rate of 7.2%. Most of the population (as of 2000) speaks Italian language (3,714 or 90.5%), with German being second most common (210 or 5.1%) and French being third (49 or 1.2%). There are 4 people who speak Romansh.

As of 2008, the gender distribution of the population was 47.6% male and 52.4% female. The population was made up of 1,621 Swiss men (35.8% of the population), and 536 (11.8%) non-Swiss men. There were 1,899 Swiss women (41.9%), and 476 (10.5%) non-Swiss women. Of the population in the municipality 1,038 or about 25.3% were born in Morbio Inferiore and lived there in 2000. There were 1,315 or 32.0% who were born in the same canton, while 421 or 10.3% were born somewhere else in Switzerland, and 1,215 or 29.6% were born outside of Switzerland.

In 2008 there were 33 live births to Swiss citizens and 6 births to non-Swiss citizens, and in same time span there were 24 deaths of Swiss citizens and 8 non-Swiss citizen deaths. Ignoring immigration and emigration, the population of Swiss citizens increased by 9 while the foreign population decreased by 2. There were 4 Swiss men and 4 Swiss women who immigrated back to Switzerland. At the same time, there were 20 non-Swiss men and 28 non-Swiss women who immigrated from another country to Switzerland. The total Swiss population change in 2008 (from all sources, including moves across municipal borders) was an increase of 46 and the non-Swiss population change was an increase of 63 people. This represents a population growth rate of 2.5%.

The age distribution, as of 2009, in Morbio Inferiore is; 423 children or 9.3% of the population are between 0 and 9 years old and 489 teenagers or 10.8% are between 10 and 19. Of the adult population, 460 people or 10.2% of the population are between 20 and 29 years old. 601 people or 13.3% are between 30 and 39, 814 people or 18.0% are between 40 and 49, and 605 people or 13.3% are between 50 and 59. The senior population distribution is 534 people or 11.8% of the population are between 60 and 69 years old, 398 people or 8.8% are between 70 and 79, there are 208 people or 4.6% who are over 80.

As of 2000, there were 1,545 people who were single and never married in the municipality. There were 2,115 married individuals, 272 widows or widowers and 173 individuals who are divorced.

As of 2000, there were 1,661 private households in the municipality, and an average of 2.4 persons per household. There were 449 households that consist of only one person and 60 households with five or more people. In 2000 there were 547 single family homes (or 66.9% of the total) out of a total of 818 inhabited buildings. There were 221 multi-family buildings (27.0%), along with 25 multi-purpose buildings that were mostly used for housing (3.1%) and 25 other use buildings (commercial or industrial) that also had some housing (3.1%). Of the single family homes 22 were built before 1919, while 61 were built between 1990 and 2000. The greatest number of single family homes (168) were built between 1981 and 1990.

In 2000 there were 1,891 apartments in the municipality. The most common apartment size was 4 rooms of which there were 670. There were 43 single room apartments and 507 apartments with five or more rooms. Of these apartments, a total of 1,659 apartments (87.7% of the total) were permanently occupied, while 43 apartments (2.3%) were seasonally occupied and 189 apartments (10.0%) were empty. The vacancy rate for the municipality, in 2008, was 3.51%. As of 2007, the construction rate of new housing units was 3.7 new units per 1000 residents.

Out of a total of 1,663 households that answered this question, 27.0% were households made up of just one person and 37 were adults who lived with their parents. Of the rest of the households, there are 412 married couples without children, 619 married couples with children There were 117 single parents with a child or children. There were 27 households that were made up og unrelated people and 2 households that were made of some sort of institution or another collective housing.

The historical population is given in the following chart:

== Heritage sites of national significance ==
The Sanctuary of S. Maria Dei Miracoli, the Secondary School and Villa Valsangiacomo are listed as Swiss heritage site of national significance.

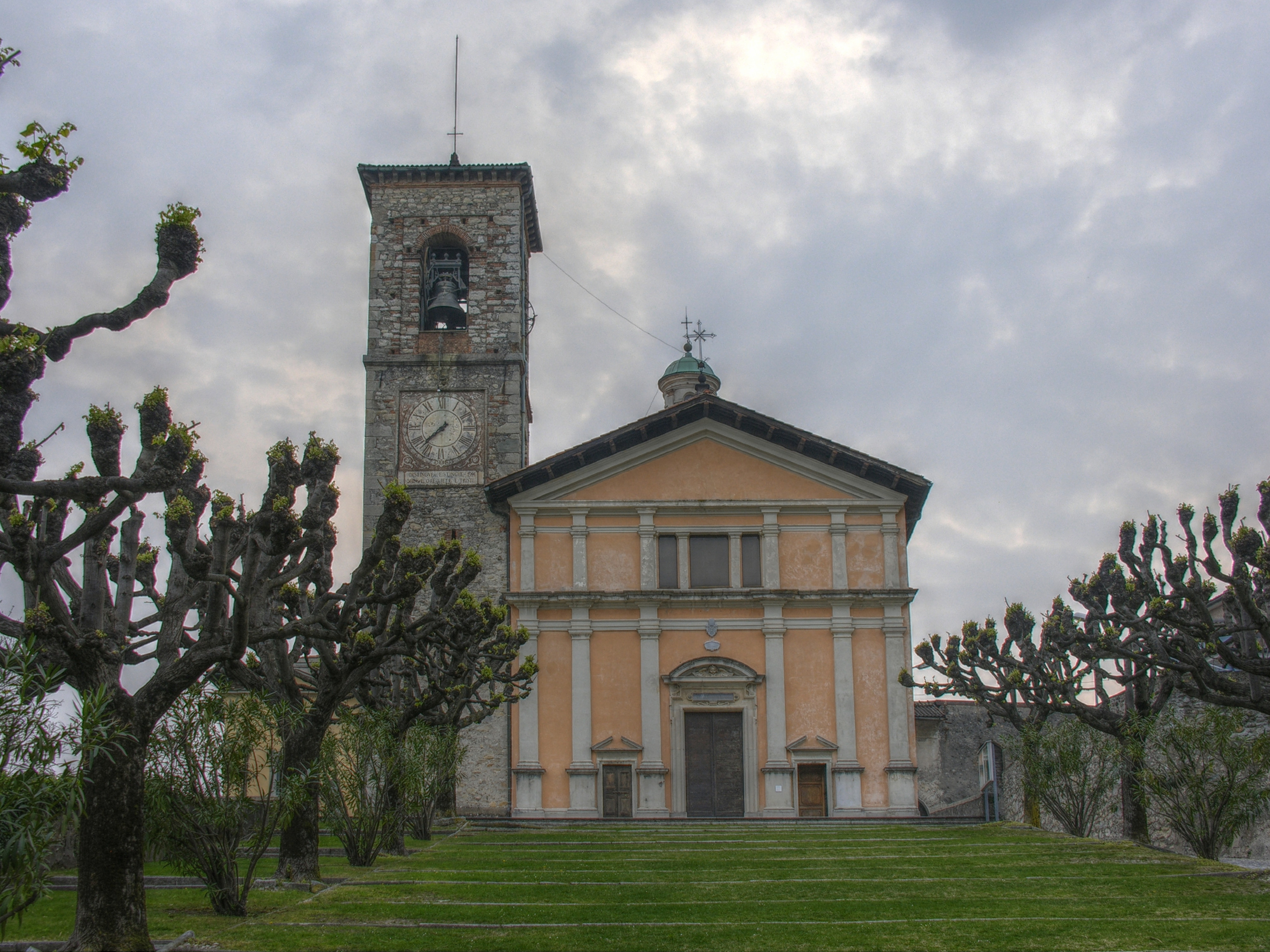
Sanctuary of S. Maria Dei Miracoli

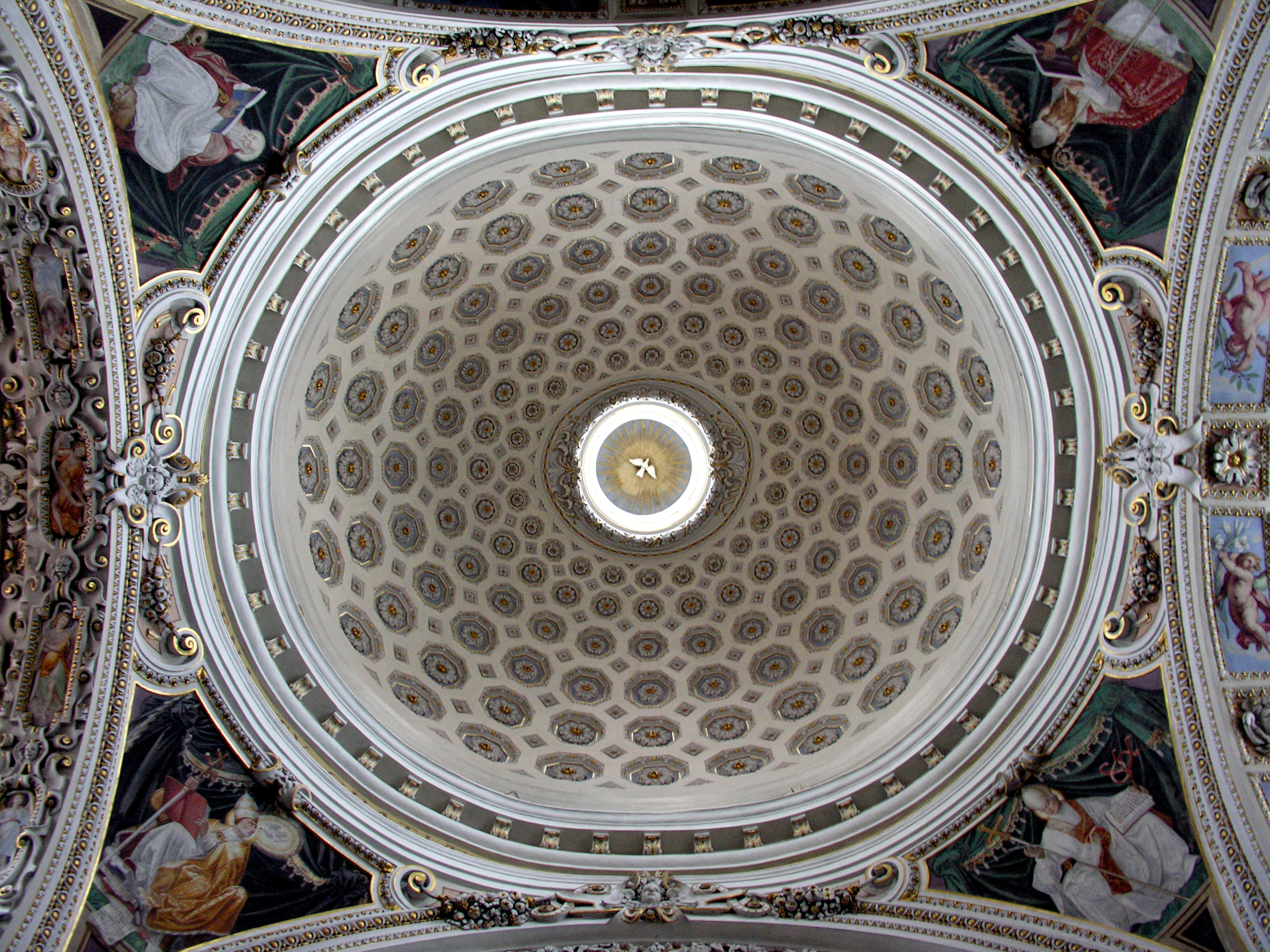
Interior of S. Maria dei Miracoli

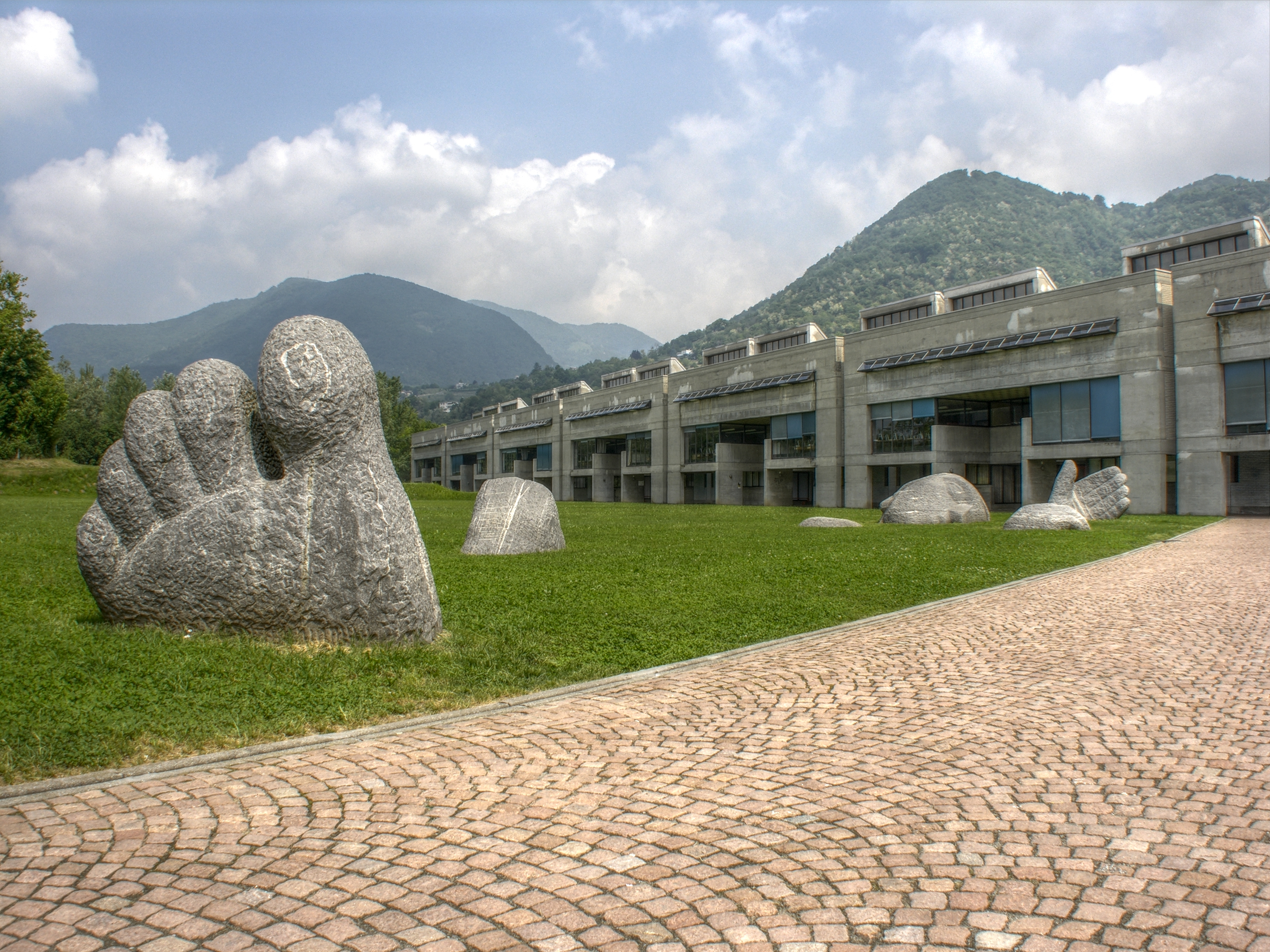
Secondary School

== Politics ==
In the 2007 federal election the most popular party was the CVP which received 25.78% of the vote. The next three most popular parties were the FDP (20.5%), the SP (19.82%) and the Ticino League (19.11%). In the federal election, a total of 1,309 votes were cast, and the voter turnout was 46.6%.

In the 2007 Gran Consiglio election, there were a total of 2,794 registered voters in Morbio Inferiore, of which 1,703 or 61.0% voted. 30 blank ballots were cast, leaving 1,673 valid ballots in the election. The most popular party was the PPD+GenGiova which received 351 or 21.0% of the vote. The next three most popular parties were; the PLRT (with 344 or 20.6%), the LEGA (with 282 or 16.9%) and the PS (with 281 or 16.8%).

In the 2007 Consiglio di Stato election, 17 blank ballots and 5 null ballots were cast, leaving 1,681 valid ballots in the election. The most popular party was the LEGA which received 367 or 21.8% of the vote. The next three most popular parties were; the PPD (with 343 or 20.4%), the PLRT (with 332 or 19.8%) and the PS (with 320 or 19.0%).

== Economy ==
As of 2007, Morbio Inferiore had an unemployment rate of 4.97%. As of 2005, there were 31 people employed in the primary economic sector and about 13 businesses involved in this sector. 257 people were employed in the secondary sector and there were 28 businesses in this sector. 1,016 people were employed in the tertiary sector, with 147 businesses in this sector. There were 1,841 residents of the municipality who were employed in some capacity, of which females made up 41.2% of the workforce.

In 2008 the total number of full-time equivalent jobs was 1,158. The number of jobs in the primary sector was 7, all of which were in agriculture. The number of jobs in the secondary sector was 240, of which 114 or (47.5%) were in manufacturing and 126 (52.5%) were in construction. The number of jobs in the tertiary sector was 911. In the tertiary sector; 407 or 44.7% were in wholesale or retail sales or the repair of motor vehicles, 24 or 2.6% were in the movement and storage of goods, 72 or 7.9% were in a hotel or restaurant, 13 or 1.4% were in the information industry, 21 or 2.3% were the insurance or financial industry, 55 or 6.0% were technical professionals or scientists, 104 or 11.4% were in education and 134 or 14.7% were in health care.

In 2000, there were 1,357 workers who commuted into the municipality and 1,451 workers who commuted away. The municipality is a net exporter of workers, with about 1.1 workers leaving the municipality for every one entering. About 29.6% of the workforce coming into Morbio Inferiore are coming from outside Switzerland, while 1.4% of the locals commute out of Switzerland for work. Of the working population, 8% used public transportation to get to work, and 68.7% used a private car.

== Religion ==
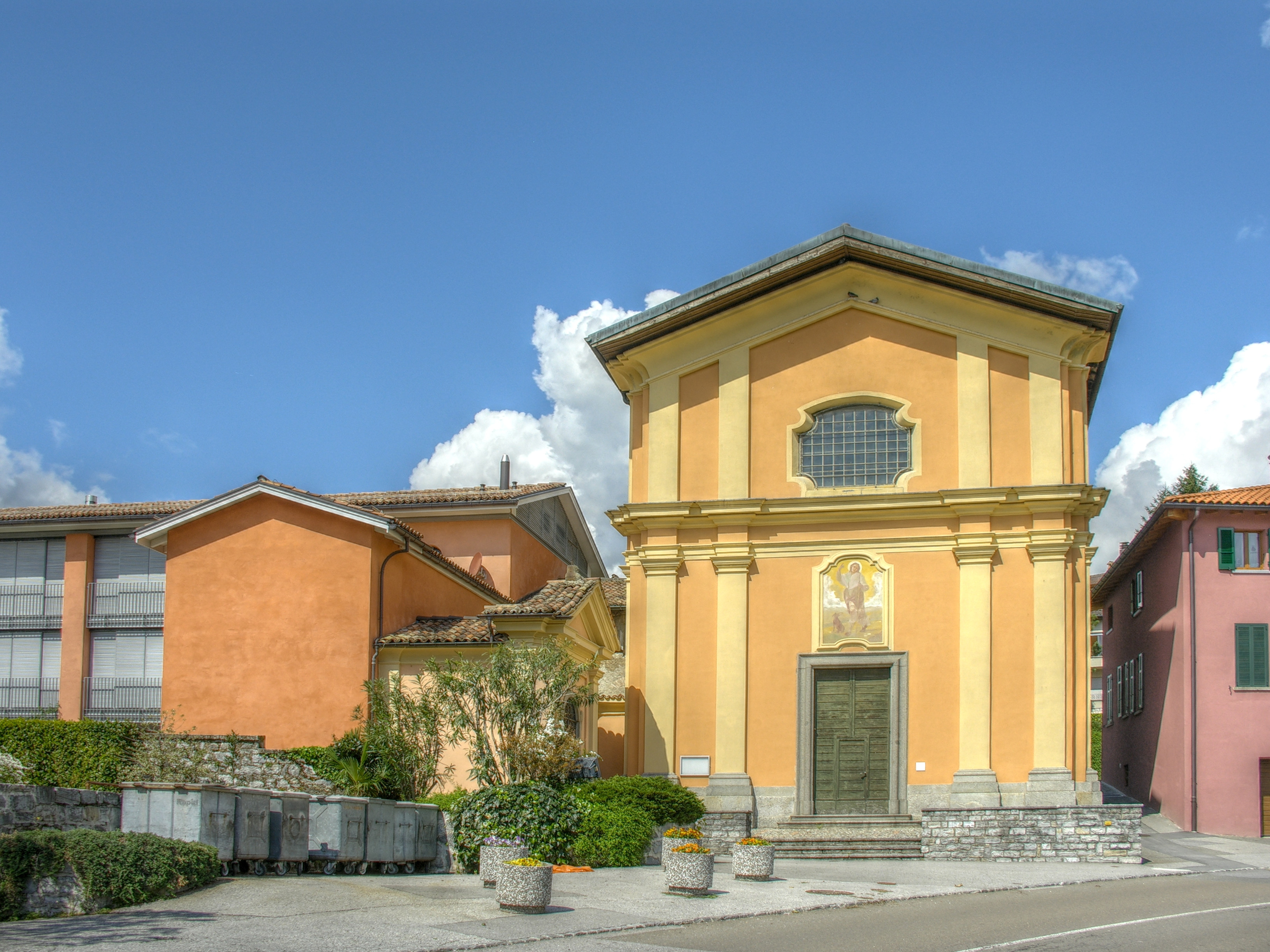
San Rocco Church

From the 2000 census, 3,460 or 84.3% were Roman Catholic, while 132 or 3.2% belonged to the Swiss Reformed Church. Of the rest of the population, there were 23 members of an Orthodox church (or about 0.56% of the population), there were 8 individuals (or about 0.19% of the population) who belonged to the Christian Catholic Church, and, there were 33 individuals (or about 0.80% of the population) who belonged to another Christian church. There were 2 individuals who were Buddhist, 13 individuals who were Hindu and 1 individual who belonged to another church. 204 (or about 4.97% of the population) belonged to no church, are agnostic or atheist, and 192 individuals (or about 4.68% of the population) did not answer the question.

== Education ==
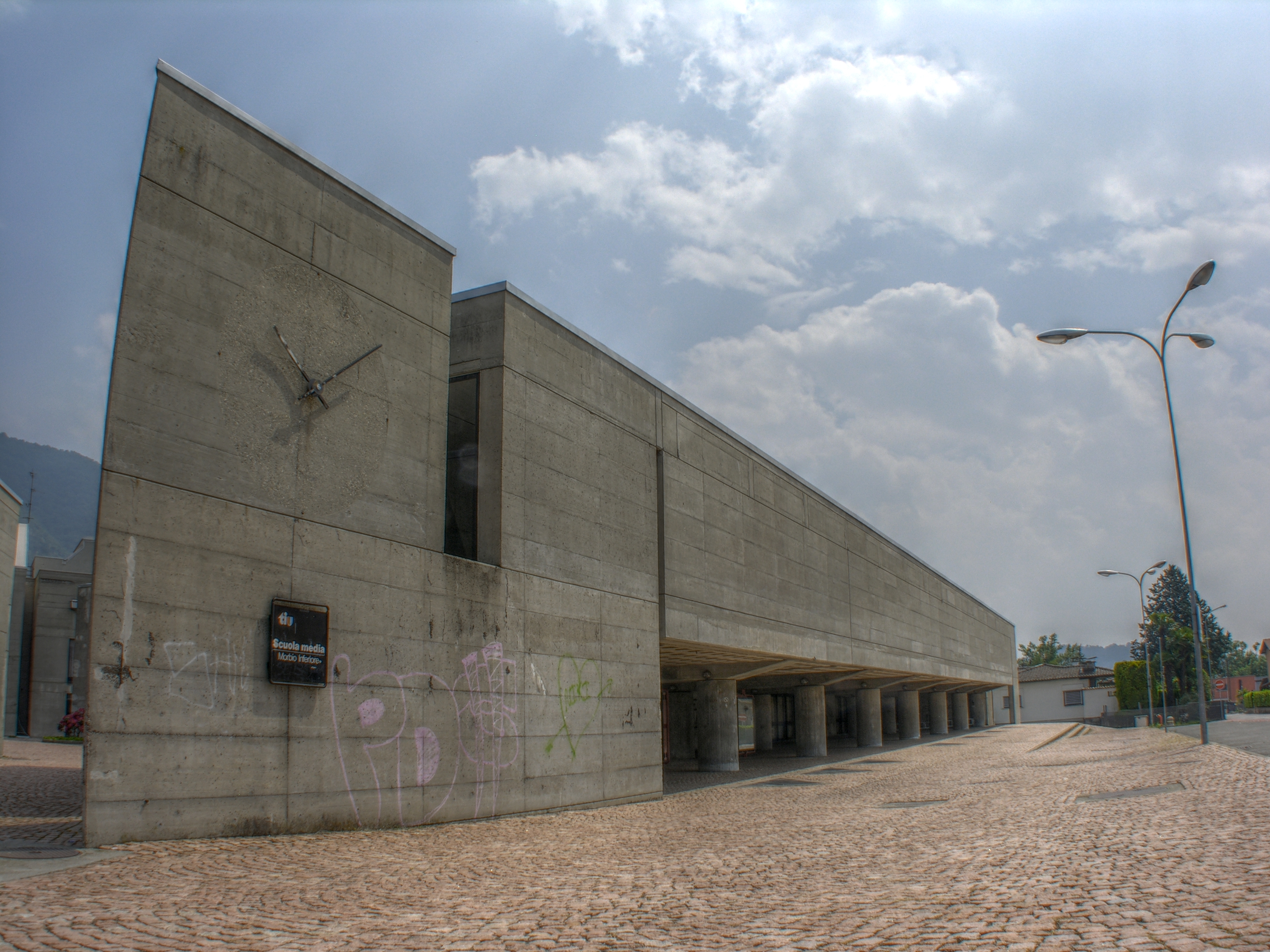
Secondary School in Morbio Inferiore

In Morbio Inferiore about 1,588 or (38.7%) of the population have completed non-mandatory upper secondary education, and 432 or (10.5%) have completed additional higher education (either university or a Fachhochschule). Of the 432 who completed tertiary schooling, 50.5% were Swiss men, 27.5% were Swiss women, 15.0% were non-Swiss men and 6.9% were non-Swiss women.

In Morbio Inferiore there were a total of 704 students (as of 2009). The Ticino education system provides up to three years of non-mandatory kindergarten and in Morbio Inferiore there were 119 children in kindergarten. The primary school program lasts for five years and includes both a standard school and a special school. In the municipality, 193 students attended the standard primary schools and 8 students attended the special school. In the lower secondary school system, students either attend a two-year middle school followed by a two-year pre-apprenticeship or they attend a four-year program to prepare for higher education. There were 178 students in the two-year middle school and 3 in their pre-apprenticeship, while 87 students were in the four-year advanced program.

The upper secondary school includes several options, but at the end of the upper secondary program, a student will be prepared to enter a trade or to continue on to a university or college. In Ticino, vocational students may either attend school while working on their internship or apprenticeship (which takes three or four years) or may attend school followed by an internship or apprenticeship (which takes one year as a full-time student or one and a half to two years as a part-time student). There were 48 vocational students who were attending school full-time and 60 who attend part-time.

The professional program lasts three years and prepares a student for a job in engineering, nursing, computer science, business, tourism and similar fields. There were 8 students in the professional program.

As of 2000, there were 219 students in Morbio Inferiore who came from another municipality, while 254 residents attended schools outside the municipality.

== Literary references ==
Hermann Hesse references Morbio in two of his greatest novels. In Journey to the East it is while crossing the gorge of Morbio Inferiore that "servant" Leo suddenly disappears allegorically taking with him Hesse's previous faith in the whole Journey (i.e. in spiritual development).

In The Glass Bead Game, Hesse mentions a supposed concert hall featuring a perfect (i.e. allegorical) Bach organ as being sited between Morbio and Bremgarten.
