= Como Cathedral =

Catholic cathedral in Lombardy, Italy

Coordinates: 45°48′42.46″N 9°5′2.14″E

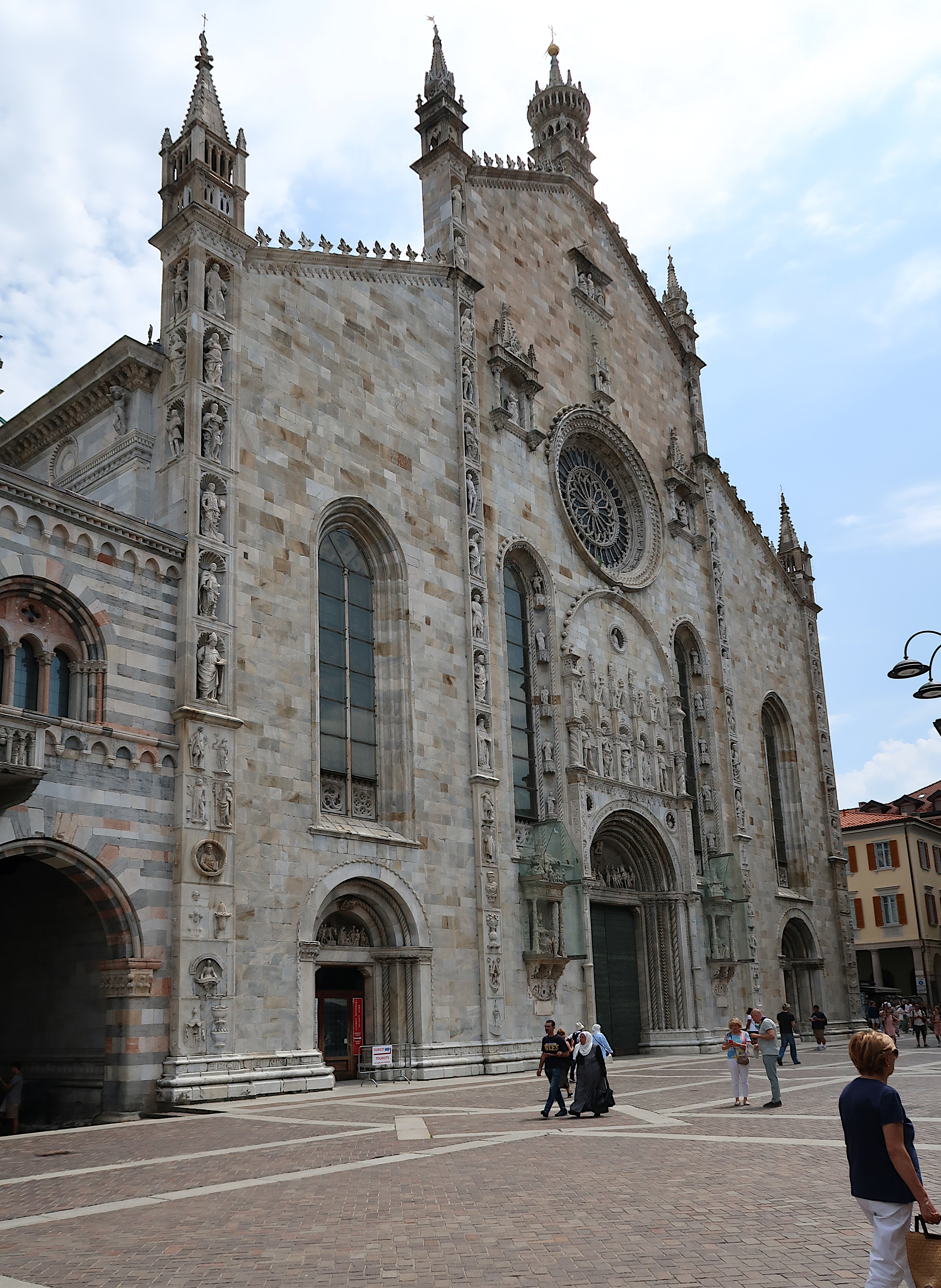
- West front

Location
- Interactive map of Como Cathedral

Como Cathedral (Italian: Cattedrale di Santa Maria Assunta or simply Duomo di Como; Lombard: Dòmm de Còmm) is the Catholic cathedral of the city of Como, Lombardy, Italy, and the seat of the Bishop of Como. It is dedicated to the Assumption of the Blessed Virgin Mary.

== History ==
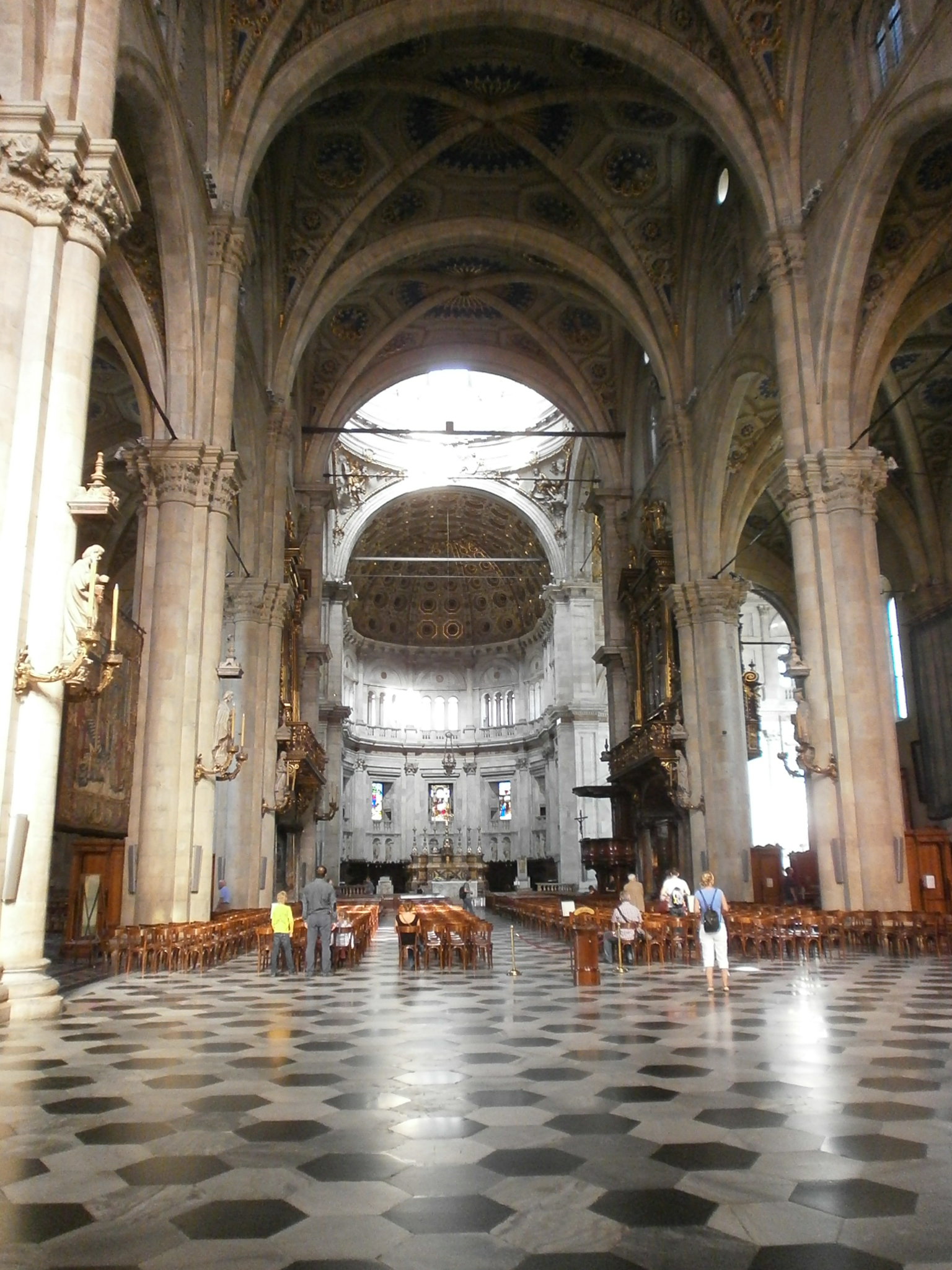
The nave, looking east

The cathedral is commonly described as the last Gothic cathedral built in Italy: construction on it, on the site of the earlier Romanesque cathedral dedicated to Santa Maria Maggiore, began in 1396, 10 years after the foundation of Milan Cathedral. The construction works, started under the supervision of Lorenzo degli Spazzi di Laino, did not finish until 1770 with the completion of the Rococo cupola by Filippo Juvarra. The imposing west front was built between 1457 and 1498 and features a rose window and a portal between two statues of Pliny the Elder and Pliny the Younger, natives of Como.

== Description ==
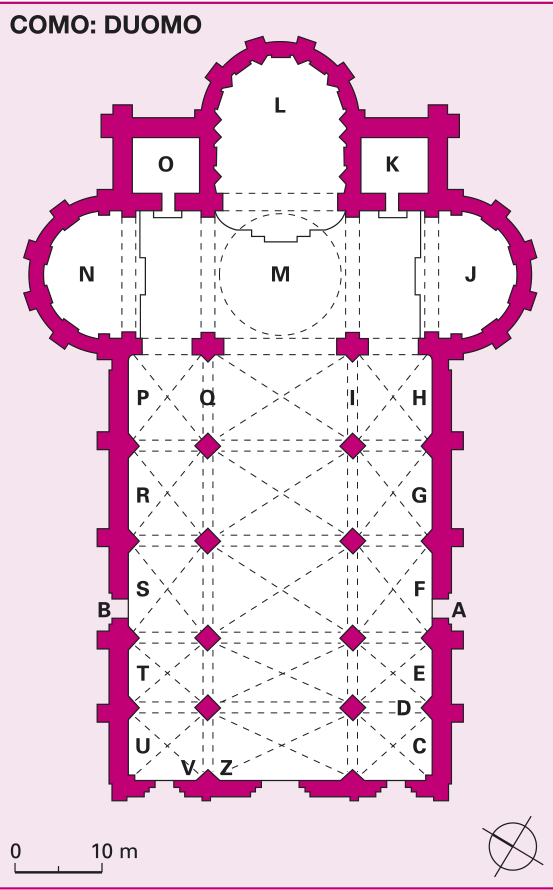
Plan of the cathedral

It is 87 metres long, from 36 to 56 metres wide, and 75 metres high into the top of the cupola. It has a Latin cross floor plan with a central nave and two side aisles, separated by pillars, and a Renaissance transept, with an imposing cupola over the crossing. The apses and the choir are of the 16th century. The interior has a series of nine important tapestries, woven at the end of the 16th century, in Ferrara, Florence and Brussels. There are also a number of 16th-century paintings by Bernardino Luini and Gaudenzio Ferrari.

== Sources ==
- Como Cernobbio e Brunate. Como: Editrice Lariologo. ISBN 88-87284-21-0.
