= Cantoni =

Cantoni is a surname. Notable people with the surname include:

- Members of the Cantoni family, a family of artists and craftsmen originally from Valle di Muggio in Canton Ticino, Switzerland, active between the 16th and 19th century
  - Pietro Cantoni (1648–1700)
  - Francesco Maria Cantoni (1699–1772)
  - Pietro Lorenzo Cantoni (1708–1785)
  - Simone Cantoni (1736–1818)
  - Anna Cantoni (1769–1846)
- Achille Cantoni (1835–1867), Italian war volunteer
- Attilio Cantoni (1931–2017), Italian rower
- Domenico Cantoni (born 1966), Italian lightweight rower
- Eitel Cantoni (1906–1997), Uruguayan racing driver
- Eva Cantoni (born 1970), Swiss statistician
- Giovanni Cantoni (1818–1897), Italian physicist
- Giulio Cantoni (1915–2005), American biochemist
- Jack Cantoni (1948–2013), French rugby union player
- Lelio Cantoni (1802–1857), Italian rabbi
- Mark Cantoni (born 1979), former Australian rugby league player
- Oscar Cantoni (born 1950), Italian prelate of the Catholic Church
- Raffaele Cantoni (1896–1971), Italian anti-Fascist and Jewish resistance member
- Tammy Cantoni (born 1972), Australian pool and snooker player
- Vincent Cantoni (1927–2013), French rugby league footballer

== See also ==
- Cantoni Cotton Mill
