= Cantoni family =

Swiss artistic family (16th-18th centuries)

Cantoni family Cantone, Cantoni Grigo, Cantone Grigo
- Origin: Valle di Muggio, Ticino, Switzerland
- Founded: 16th century
- Founder: Taddeo and Simone Agustoni
- Current head: Extinct
- Final head: Maria Caterina Cantoni (Cabbio branch); Simone and Gaetano Cantoni (Muggio branch)
- Connected families: Agustoni, Brignole Sale, Durazzo
- Distinctions: Chief architects of Genoa
- Traditions: Architecture, Stucco work, Engineering
- Estates: Cabbio, Muggio
- Dissolution: 19th century
- Cadet branches: Cantoni of Cabbio (stucco workers); Cantoni Grigo of Muggio (architects and engineers)

The Cantoni family was a family of artists and craftsmen (maestranze) originally from Valle di Muggio in Canton Ticino (Switzerland), active on numerous construction sites in Italy and throughout Europe between the 16th and 18th centuries. The family established itself particularly in Genoa, where several members served as chief architects to the city, and became renowned for their work in architecture, stucco decoration, and civil engineering.

== Origins and etymology ==
The Cantoni of Cabbio descended from the Agustoni family, whose surname was widespread in Valle di Muggio. The two appellations often coexisted during the 16th century and in early 17th century documents. The formula "de Augustonibus vocati Canton" gradually gave way to the form "Cantone," which later became "Cantoni." The origin of the nickname "Cantone" remains unknown, though it certainly did not derive from that of a father or spouse, as was frequently the case with family names.

The earliest mentions date from the 16th century and concern Taddeo (before 1544) and Simone Agustoni, who may have been brothers or cousins. Their descendants gave rise to two lineages with very different destinies. Simone's descendants settled permanently in Genoa, while Taddeo's descendants, who were the first to contribute to the Cantoni family's renown in the Ligurian capital, maintained ties with their country of origin.

== The Genoa period ==
=== Bernardo Cantoni and the early generations ===
Among Taddeo's descendants, Bernardo Cantoni (c. 1505-1580), also known as Bernardino da Cabio, became famous as chief architect of the city of Genoa (architetto camerale per i Padri del Comune), a position he held from 1531 almost until his death. In this capacity, he designed and built the Strada Nuova (New Street) and the adjacent luxury residential quarter (from 1551), was responsible for the construction site of the Basilica of Our Lady of the Assumption at Carignano (1556-1567), built according to plans by Galeazzo Alessi, an architect from Perugia, and oversaw numerous other public and private buildings.

Equally active were his brothers Antonio and Pietro (who died in Spain in 1571), his cousins Agostino and Giorgio, his nephews Taddeo and Battista, as well as the sons of the latter, Pier Francesco and Bernardo Cantoni, who served as chief architects of Genoa from 1625 to 1630 and from 1647 to 1653, respectively. Thanks to a favorable economic context (the "Century of the Genoese"), they had the opportunity to work for noble clientele during the 16th and early decades of the 17th century. Subsequently, they secured important public contracts, including construction of the new jetty, city walls, the fort on Mount Peralto, and watchtowers on the coast and in Corsica.

=== Migration strategies and family organization ===
Within the various family branches, a strategy based on multi-locality emerged. Some practiced temporary emigration to maintain the hearth at Cabbio. This task was often entrusted to the family's women, who sometimes, like Caterina Cantoni, second wife of Pietro Cantoni, or Anna Cantoni, nevertheless followed their husbands in emigration. Others preferred to marry Ligurian women to better integrate into Genoese life. Still others, following less favorable economic conditions and especially to escape the plague epidemic of 1656-1657, took refuge in the valleys or headed to other destinations, such as the branch that settled in the Monaco region.

Marriage strategies, an instrument of paramount importance for ensuring the family's professional success and defending the integrity of its patrimony, were grafted onto this game of absences and presences. Unions with other lineages of artists and craftsmen (maestranze) were therefore privileged, and marriages between relatives were sometimes used, as in the case of brothers Simone and Gaetano (1745-1827) Cantoni who married sisters Maria Giuseppa and Anna Cantoni, their nieces.

== The 18th century branches ==
=== The Cabbio stucco workshop ===
Within this dispersed family, the hearth was maintained at Cabbio by Taddeo Cantoni (1617-1662) and later by his eldest son, Pietro Cantoni. Through his marriages, the latter gave birth to two distinct branches: that of the Cantoni or Cantoni Grigo of Muggio, master builders, architects and engineers, among whom the aforementioned Simone and Gaetano Cantoni distinguished themselves, and that of the Cantoni of Cabbio, owners of an important stucco workshop.

During the 18th century, Francesco Maria Cantoni and his sons Pietro Matteo (1724-1798), Rocco (1731-1818), Giacomo (1734-1804) and Giovanni Battista (1736-1789), all stucco workers, also began to diversify their destinations. Pietro Matteo and Rocco Cantoni, with their compatriots and apprentices Bartolomeo Bernasconi, Giuseppe Petondi, Pietro Bossi, Pietro Chiesa and Carlo Fiandra, consolidated relationships with their clients by completing work begun by their father Francesco Maria Cantoni in churches and oratories (Church of the Gesù in Genoa, 1725-1758; Church of Saint Roch at Ognio, 1734-1759), pleasure villas (of the Brignole Sale at Albaro, 1742-1772; of the Durazzo at Cornigliano and Albissola, 1752-1773 and 1756-1760) and private mansions (of the Brignole Sale: Palazzo Rosso, 1743-1783; of the Durazzo: Palazzo Reale, 1725 and from 1754; of the Pallavicini, 1762 and 1778-1782).

=== Expansion to the Marche and Umbria ===
The younger brothers Giacomo and Giovanni Battista Cantoni instead went to the Marche and Umbria, where they confirmed their talent as stucco workers (Church of Saint Francis at Montegiorgio, 1771; Church of Saint Augustine at Fabriano, 1768-1769) but also as designers (Church of Saint Augustine at Sigillo, 1788-1791).

=== The Palazzo Ducale project ===
In Genoa, in the second half of the 18th century, collaboration between cousins Pietro Matteo, Rocco, Simone and Gaetano Cantoni, which had already proven itself during work on the residences of the Brignole Sale family (Villa of Albaro and Palazzo Rosso), became even closer at the Palazzo Ducale, renovated after the fire of 1777 according to plans by Simone Cantoni. In this construction site worked numerous artists and craftsmen from Valle di Muggio, united by biological or spiritual ties of varying closeness, as well as by apprenticeship practices. Alongside the Cantoni were found, each in their specialty, Gaetano Perucchi, foreman from Castel San Pietro, the Pozzi, painters and decorators, the Petondi, masters in construction trades and stucco workers, and the Bonetti, skilled masons.

== Decline and extinction ==
This differentiation of tasks, surpassing the concept of workshop and responding to a targeted division of labor, synthesis and epilogue of a centuries-old family history, was interrupted for lack of direct male descendants. At Cabbio, the family died out with Maria Caterina, only daughter of Rocco Cantoni. At Muggio, Simone and Gaetano had no heirs; the Cantoni who continued the family tradition in construction were distant relatives who unsuccessfully tried their luck in Argentina, where the sector still offered opportunities.

In Valle di Muggio, the memory of the Cantoni, like that of other families of artists and craftsmen, has been perpetuated through the numerous traces left in the region. The family house at Cabbio, which became in the 20th century the seat of the Ethnographic Museum of the Valley, is one example among others.

== Notable family members ==
Notable family members include:

- Pietro Cantoni (1648–1700)
- Francesco Maria Cantoni (1699–1772)
- Pietro Lorenzo Cantoni (1708–1785)
- Simone Cantoni (1736–1818)
- Anna Cantoni (1769–1846)

== Bibliography ==
- Martinola, Giuseppe: L'architetto Simone Cantoni (1739-1818), 1950.
- Poleggi, Ennio: Strada Nuova. Una lottizzazione del Cinquecento a Genova, 1968 (1972²).
- Alfonso, Luigi: Tomaso Orsolino e altri artisti di «Natione Lombarda» a Genova e in Liguria dal sec. XIV al XIX, 1985.
- Ossanna Cavadini, Nicoletta: Simone Cantoni architetto, 2003.
- Bianchi, Stefania: I cantieri dei Cantoni. Relazioni, opere, vicissitudini di una famiglia della Svizzera italiana in Liguria (secoli XVI-XVIII), 2013.
