= Pietro Lorenzo Cantoni =

18th-century Swiss-Italian builder and contractor

- Born: July 12, 1708; Muggio, Ticino
- Died: January 29, 1785 (aged 76); Genoa, Republic of Genoa
- Occupations: Builder, contractor
- Spouse: Anna Maria Gianazzi
- Children: Maria Antonia, Simone Cantoni, Gaetano
- Parent(s): Marc'Antonio Cantoni, Angela Caterina Calvi
- Family: Cantoni family

Pietro Lorenzo Cantoni (12 July 1708 – 29 January 1785) was a Swiss builder and contractor who became a prominent representative of the maestranze (master craftsmen) active in Genoa during the 18th century. Born in Muggio in present-day Canton Ticino, he spent much of his career working on major construction projects for the Genoese aristocracy, particularly the Brignole Sale family.

== Early life and family ==
Pietro Lorenzo Cantoni was born in Muggio on 12 July 1708, the son of Marc'Antonio Cantoni, a constructor, and Angela Caterina Calvi, daughter of Simone Calvi of Muggio. His paternal grandfather was Pietro Cantoni. In 1734, he married Anna Maria Gianazzi in Muggio, daughter of Giovanni Battista Gianazzi, a master mason. This marriage, along with his brother Giovanni Battista Cantoni's marriage to Cristina Gianazzi (Anna Maria's sister), consolidated the Cantoni family's ties with another prominent family from the Valle di Muggio.

Among Pietro Lorenzo and Anna Maria's children, Maria Antonia Cantoni was born in Muggio in 1736, followed by Simone Cantoni in 1739. Maria Antonia later married Giuseppe Fontana, a foreman who frequently worked on construction sites with Pietro Lorenzo. Their third child, Gaetano Cantoni, was born in Genoa in 1745, reflecting the family's permanent relocation to the Ligurian capital.

== Career and major works ==
Following family tradition, Pietro Lorenzo Cantoni distinguished himself through his construction expertise, which he applied to public works commissions and projects for both secular and ecclesiastical patrons. The Brignole Sale family, prominent Genoese marquises, entrusted him with managing their properties, and Cantoni oversaw improvements, construction, and maintenance of palazzos, pleasure villas, and other buildings they rented in Genoa and the surrounding areas.

=== Early projects ===
In 1739, Cantoni traveled to Novi Ligure to collaborate on the construction of the palace in Piazza Collegiata (1739-1742), working under the direction of architect Giovanni Antonio Ricca the Younger. Pietro Lorenzo had previously met Ricca in the workshop of his uncle Francesco Maria Cantoni, when he was just over 20 years old and working on the construction site of the church of Saint-Torpès.

From 1753, Cantoni directed the construction site of the Palazzo della Dogana, also located in Novi Ligure in the San Pietro district. The palace featured a notable helical staircase that became one of its architectural highlights.

=== Major commissions ===
Concurrently, Cantoni was occupied with transformation works at the Brignole Sale villa in Albaro (beginning in 1742), which involved numerous compatriots including his future son-in-law Giuseppe Fontana and masters named Bulla, Barella, Cereghetti, and Svanascini. These works continued into the 1770s. Modernization work that began in 1744 at the Palazzo Bianco and Palazzo Rosso in Genoa was completed 40 years later with decorations executed by his stuccoator cousins, the sons of Francesco Maria Cantoni.

Religious orders also provided significant commissions, particularly for the convent of Saint-André (1765-1773) and the church of Sainte-Marthe, realized with the collaboration of other compatriots, the Maggi and Piotti families (1774-1788). Construction projects for the Padri del Comune (Genoese magistrature) were equally substantial and included the fort of Santa Tecla (designed by engineer Jacques De Sicre in 1747), bridges over the Polcevera torrent, and works on the port jetty.

== Death and legacy ==
After decades of intensive work, Pietro Lorenzo Cantoni died in Genoa in January 1785. As the last master builder of the Cantoni family of Muggio, his success within the maestranze system enabled his successors to move beyond this role, which was considered less prestigious than that of architect. His son Simone Cantoni would go on to become a renowned neoclassical architect.

== Bibliography ==
- Forno, Ilaria: Pietro, Simone e Gaetano Cantoni. Imprenditori edili e architetti in Liguria tra metà Settecento e inizio Ottocento, doctoral thesis, University of Turin, 1999.
- De Negri, Emmina: «Intorno ai Cantoni. Capi d'opera e architetti a Genova a fine Settecento e la ricostruzione di Palazzo Ducale», in: Quaderni di storia dell'architettura, 3, 2000, pp. 103–120.
- Bianchi, Stefania: I cantieri dei Cantoni. Relazioni, opere, vicissitudini di una famiglia della Svizzera italiana in Liguria (secoli XVI-XVIII), 2013.
- Barbieri, Daniela: Novi e i suoi palazzi. Sistemi insediativi dell'aristocrazia genovese tra Seicento e Settecento, 2021.
