= Charter of Swiss Official Statistics =

Swiss statistical offices

In May 2002, the statistical offices and services of Switzerland adopted a Charter of Swiss Public Statistics, now the Charter of Swiss Official Statistics. In this code of professional ethics they declare that official statistics are an essential public service which meets the needs of a democratic society and a modern state. They also describe the pertinence, quality and credibility of published statistical information as the main objectives of official statistics.

The Charter was revised in 2007 and 2012. The current Charter has been brought into line with the European Statistics Code of Practice. It opens with a preamble, which is followed by 21 basic principles. Indicators explain and elaborate upon each of the principles. The Charter's scope of application, its organisational arrangements, the mandate of the Ethics Council and a comparison of the Charter and the European Statistics Code of Practice are presented in the annexes.

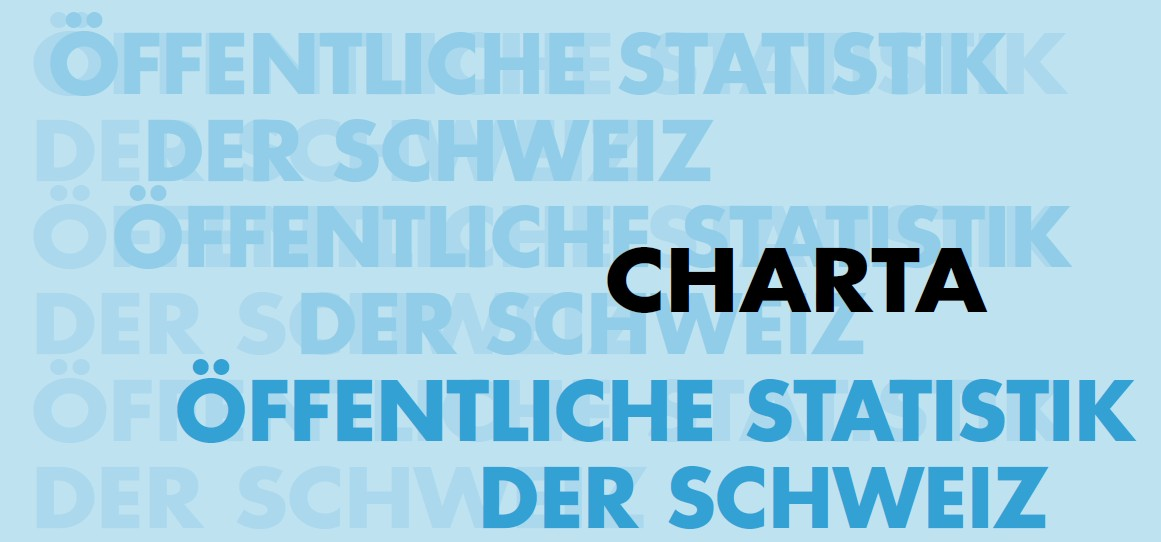
Charter of Swiss Public Statistics

== See also ==
- Federal Statistical Office (Switzerland)
- Statistical Yearbook of Switzerland

== Sources ==
- FSO, Swiss Conference of Regional Statistical Offices CORSTAT (eds): Charter of Swiss Public Statistics, 3rd revised edition, Neuchâtel/Zurich 2012 (PDF)
- FSO, Swiss Public Statistics Charter
