= Legal basis of official statistics in Switzerland =

The legal basis of official statistics in Switzerland is the Swiss Federal Constitution. Article 65 of the Swiss Federal Constitution sets out the mandate and competencies of official statistics.

The legal bases of Swiss official statistics are set out in more detail in the Federal Statistics Act of 9 October 1992. The Federal Statistics Act formulates the tasks and organisation of federal statistics as well as basic principles relating to statistical data collection, publications and services. In particular, it outlines the principles of data protection.

Being the largest and oldest statistical survey, the census is governed by its own law (promulgated on 22 June 2007). This also applies to the simplified collection of data thanks to the harmonisation of population and other official personal registers, which is mentioned in Art. 65 of the Constitution.

Various ordinances add detail to the provisions in the above-named laws – concerning matters such as the organisation of federal statistics, the conduct of federal statistical surveys, fees for statistical services provided by administrative units of the Confederation, the Business and Enterprise Register and the Register of Buildings and Dwellings.

== On the origin of the legal bases ==
On 23 July 1870, the Swiss Parliament approved a law on "Official Statistical Surveys in Switzerland", which was confined to organisational issues. This law resulted in the non-standardised and unsystematic development of statistics.

The Federal Statistics Act of 9 October 1992 replaced the 1870 law, laying a modern foundation for Swiss statistics. The salient innovations in the 1992 Act are: the coordination function of the Federal Statistical Office (FSO) in its capacity as the Confederation's central statistical unit, the establishment of a multi-year statistical programme for overall planning of Swiss statistics, and the institution of the Federal Statistics Commission as an advisory body to the Federal Council.

The new Federal Constitution of 18 April 1999 includes, for the first time, an article on statistics (Art. 65). Whereas in the old Federal Constitution the federal authorities were only given competence over specific statistical matters, under Art. 65 of the Federal Constitution of 1999, the federal authorities have general statistical competence: "The federal authorities shall obtain the necessary statistical data concerning the current status and changes in the population, the economy, society, education, research, spatial development and the environment in Switzerland". But statistical surveys by the cantons on their own territory are not excluded thereby – statistical competence is a parallel competence which allows parallel statistical activities by the federal authorities and the cantons under the coordination of the federal government.

== From the Federal Statistics Act (BStatG) ==
- General Provisions
- Power to Commission Surveys and Participation
- Organisation of Federal Statistics
- Data Protection and Data Security
- Dissemination and Services
- Penalties
- Final Provisions

Date of entry into force: 1 August 1993 (Federal Council Decree of 30 June 1993)

== See also ==
- Federal Statistical Office (Switzerland)
