= List of Swiss cantons by life expectancy =

The List of Swiss cantons by life expectancy ranks the cantons of Switzerland according to the average life expectancy of their population. All data comes from the Federal Statistical Office of Switzerland. In 2023, life expectancy at birth in Switzerland was 82.2 years for men and 85.8 years for women. Life expectancy in Switzerland is therefore among the highest in the world.

== List ==
Cantons according to life expectancy at birth for men and women and the average value for both sexes for the period 2022/23 in years.

Rank	Canton	Life expectancy (average)	Life expectancy (women)	life expectancy (men)
1	Zug	84.9	86.4	83.4
2	Geneva	84.6	86.4	82.7
3	Basel-Landschaft	84.5	86.2	82.8
4	Ticino	84.5	86.4	82.5
5	Uri	84.2	85.9	82.4
6	Obwalden	84.1	85.8	82.3
7	Nidwalden	84.0	85.5	82.4
8	Zürich	83.9	85.5	82.2
9	Vaud	83.9	85.8	82.1
10	Appenzell Innerrhoden	83.9	86.0	81.8
11	Aargau	83.8	85.4	82.2
12	Grisons	83.8	85.5	82.0
12	Lucerne	83.8	85.7	81.8
14	Schwyz	83.6	85.4	81.7
15	Valais	83.5	85.5	81.5
15	Appenzell Ausserrhoden	83.5	85.7	81.3
17	Glarus	83.5	85.5	81.4
18	Bern	83.4	85.3	81.5
19	Thurgau	83.4	85.1	81.6
20	Fribourg	83.3	85.1	81.5
21	St. Gallen	83.1	85.2	81.0
22	Solothurn	83.1	84.9	81.2
23	Neuchâtel	83.1	84.8	81.3
24	Schaffhausen	83.0	85.4	80.6
25	Basel-Stadt	82.7	85.0	80.4
26	Jura	82.6	84.8	80.4
	Switzerland	84.0	85.8	82.2
