= Switzerland's Land Use Statistics =

The Land Use Statistics of the Federal Statistical Office collect information in 12-year intervals about Switzerland's land use and land cover based on aerial photographs of the Federal Office of Topography (swisstopo). In addition to statistics, the Land Use Statistics also provides basic geodata in hectare resolution for Geographical Information Systems (GIS) of the Confederation, the cantons, research institutes and higher education institutions. Furthermore, it provides inputs for national programmes and indicator systems.

== Legal basis ==
The legal bases for the Land Use Statistics are Arts. 65, 73, 75, 77 and 104 of the Federal Constitution, Article 3 of the Federal Statistics Act, the Federal Council's decision of 17 February 1982 and the Ordinance of 30 June 1993 on the Conduct of Federal Statistical Surveys (SR 431.012.1), status 2004.

== Type of survey ==
The Land Use Statistics are compiled by means of aerial point sampling of aerial photographs of the Federal Office of Topography. Some 4.1 million sample points at intervals of 100x100m are made.

== Features registered ==
All of Switzerland's surface area is covered at the levels of Switzerland, cantons, districts, communes, hectares and various spatial units. The registered features are divided into 72 land use and land cover categories in the areas of settlements (buildings and industrial areas, traffic areas, recreational facilities, mines, landfills, construction sites), agriculture (arable land, meadows, pastures, fruit cultivation, vineyards and horticulture), stocked areas (forest, shrub forest, woodland), unproductive areas (watercourses, unproductive vegetation, rocks, sand, boulders, glaciers, firn).

== Date survey conducted ==
The Land Use Statistics have been compiled every 12 years since 1979. This statistic is produced the year after the aerial photographs are taken and is available two years after they are taken. The aerial photographs of the Federal Office of Topography are taken in a six-year cycle (1979/85, 1992/97, 2004/09).

== Footnotes and references ==
- Federal Statistical Office, Swiss Land Use Statistics, Fact Sheet (German)
