= The Dying Cleopatra =

c. 1648 painting by Guercino

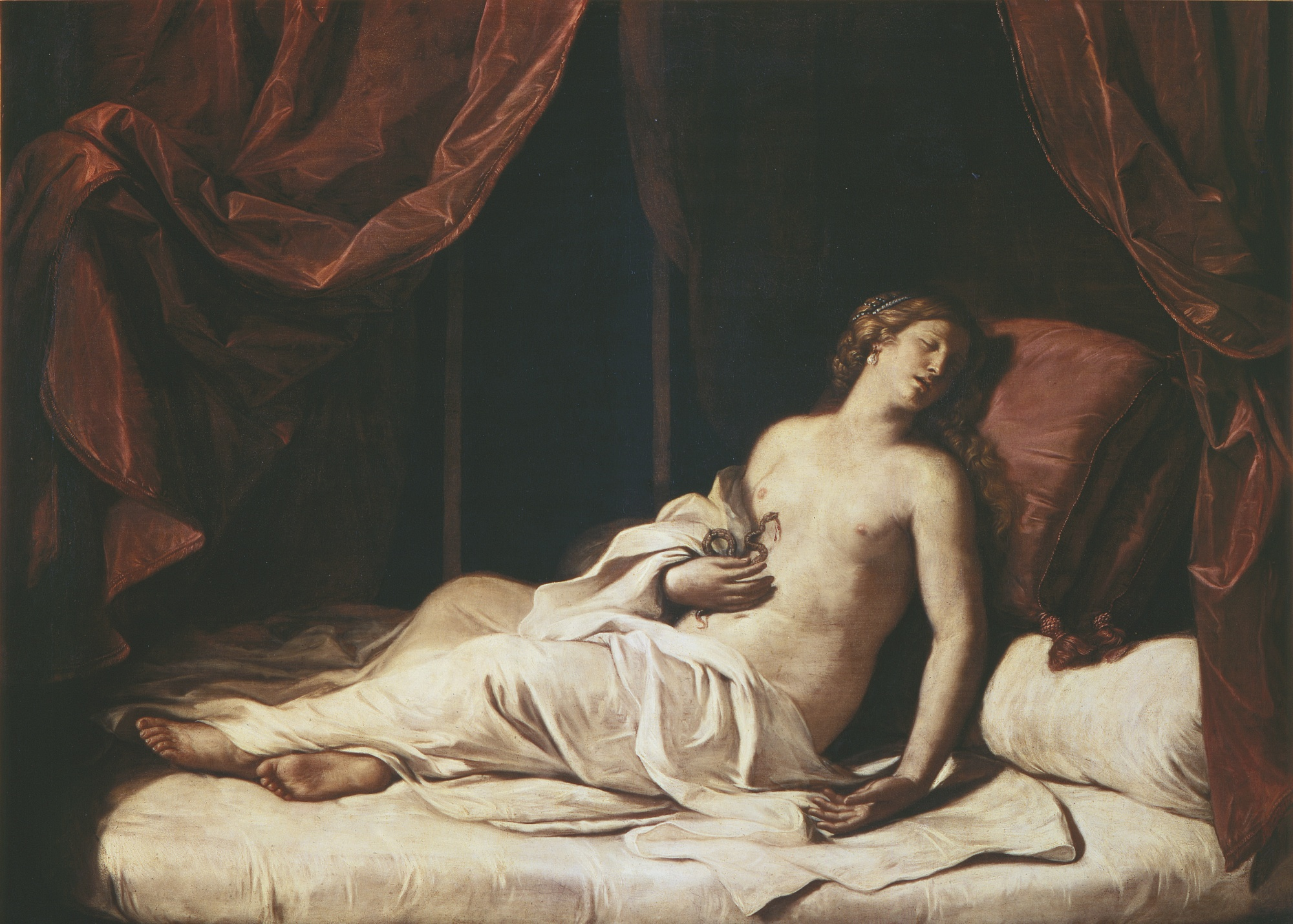
The Dying Cleopatra (c. 1648) by Guercino

The Dying Cleopatra or The Death of Cleopatra is a c. 1648 oil painting on canvas by the Italian artist Guercino, now in the Palazzo Rosso in Genoa.

== History ==
The painter is recorded as receiving 125 ducatoni (equivalent to 156 scudi) on 24 March 1648 from Monsignor Carlo Emanuele Durazzo of Genoa for a work on this subject. Initially owned by the abbots' two nephews, about a century later it was owned byt the Brignole family, in whose residence it was recorded in 1756–1766. It remained with them until 1889 when the last surviving member of the house Maria Brignole Sale, duchess of Galliera, left it to the city, which displayed it in palazzo Bianco, then its current home. Guercino produced another lower-quality work on the same subject around 1650, since on 8 March that year its commissioner Girolamo Panesi, a Genoese resident of Rome, paid him 110 ducatoni (equivalent to 132 scudi).
