= Anna Cantoni =

18th-19th century Swiss woman from the maestranze families

- Born: Anna Maria Fontana; August 18, 1769; Muggio, Switzerland
- Died: August 16, 1846 (aged 76); Muggio, Switzerland
- Other names: Annetta Cantoni, Anna Cantone
- Spouse: Gaetano Cantoni (m. 1787)
- Parent(s): Giuseppe Fontana; Maria Antonia Cantoni
- Relatives: Simone Cantoni (uncle and brother-in-law); Maria Giuseppa Fontana (sister); Pier Luigi Fontana (brother)

Anna Cantoni (18 August 1769 – 16 August 1846), also known as Annetta Cantoni or Anna Cantone, was a Swiss woman from Muggio who became a representative figure of the maestranze families, defending the interests of her lineage in the Valle di Muggio and in Genoa. Born Anna Maria Fontana, she was notable for her role in preserving family patrimony and her extensive correspondence network that provides insights into the lives of emigrant Swiss families in 18th and 19th-century Liguria.

== Early life and family ==
Anna Fontana was the youngest of three children born to Giuseppe Fontana and Maria Antonia Cantoni. She spent her youth and adolescence in her native village of Muggio. Her father worked as a foreman on construction sites belonging to Pietro Lorenzo Cantoni, who would later become Anna's father-in-law. The Fontana and Cantoni families were among the most prestigious and wealthy in Muggio, having acquired their fortune and renown through emigration.

Her brother Pier Luigi Fontana was also active on Cantoni construction sites in Liguria. According to a handwritten note from her uncle and future brother-in-law Simone Cantoni, Anna and her older sister Maria Giuseppa stayed at a monastery in Como (at least in 1784), where they likely learned to read and write with considerable skill—abilities that were not uncommon among women from maestranze families.

== Marriage and life in Genoa ==
In 1787, after obtaining papal permission, the two sisters married their uncles (their mother's brothers): Anna married Gaetano Cantoni, while Maria Giuseppa married Simone Cantoni. This double marriage between blood relatives, though singular, was not exceptional and indicated a family strategy based on endogamy. Such practices were employed in the second half of the 18th century especially by the wealthiest families to preserve their patrimony. Anna had no children with Gaetano.

Anna Cantoni subsequently settled in the Ligurian capital, where she lived permanently until the 1820s. With Gaetano Cantoni, an architect-engineer in service to Genoa and Liguria, she shared both fortunes and great misfortunes, as well as difficulties related to distance from their native lands. These included her husband's illness that left him bedridden for months in 1819, and the inability to recover debts from the Savoyard government following Genoa's annexation to the Kingdom of Sardinia, despite repeated requests even after her husband's death.

=== Correspondence network and social connections ===
From Genoa, Anna Cantoni cultivated an extensive network of relationships that she maintained through regular correspondence. Much of the information about her life can be extrapolated from the numerous letters she exchanged with relatives and acquaintances in the Valle di Muggio, as well as with people she had known in Genoa, including her husband's colleagues, administrators, and secretaries.

Among her correspondents were Giovanni Battista Nervi, the noble Brignole Sale family (who also owned the Palazzo Rosso, where Gaetano and Anna Cantoni occupied an apartment), and particularly Annetta Demé, her goddaughter, for whom she later provided a dowry to enter religious life. Her correspondence provides valuable insights into the social networks and daily concerns of Swiss emigrant families in 18th and 19th-century Italy.

== Later life and death ==
Even after her husband's death and her return to her homeland, Anna Cantoni occasionally returned to Genoa to handle family affairs and maintain her friendships. In 1839, already in her seventies, she considered making one final trip, but her poor health prevented her from doing so.

During the final years of her life, she devoted herself particularly to her cousin Luigi Fontana, whom she supported financially during his studies as an architect and engineer. In 1846, shortly before her death, she named him heir to the Cantoni patrimony in Muggio. She died on 16 August 1846 in her native village.

== Bibliography ==
- Bianchi, Stefania: I cantieri dei Cantoni. Relazioni, opere, vicissitudini di una famiglia della Svizzera italiana in Liguria (secoli XVI-XVIII), 2013.
- Bianchi, Stefania: "Annetta Cantoni Fontana. L'aristocrazia femminile dell'emigrazione nell'esercizio dei 'poteri' quotidiani", in: Revue suisse d'histoire, 68/1, 2018, pp. 108–127.
