= The Suicide of Cato =

1641 oil on canvas painting by Guercino

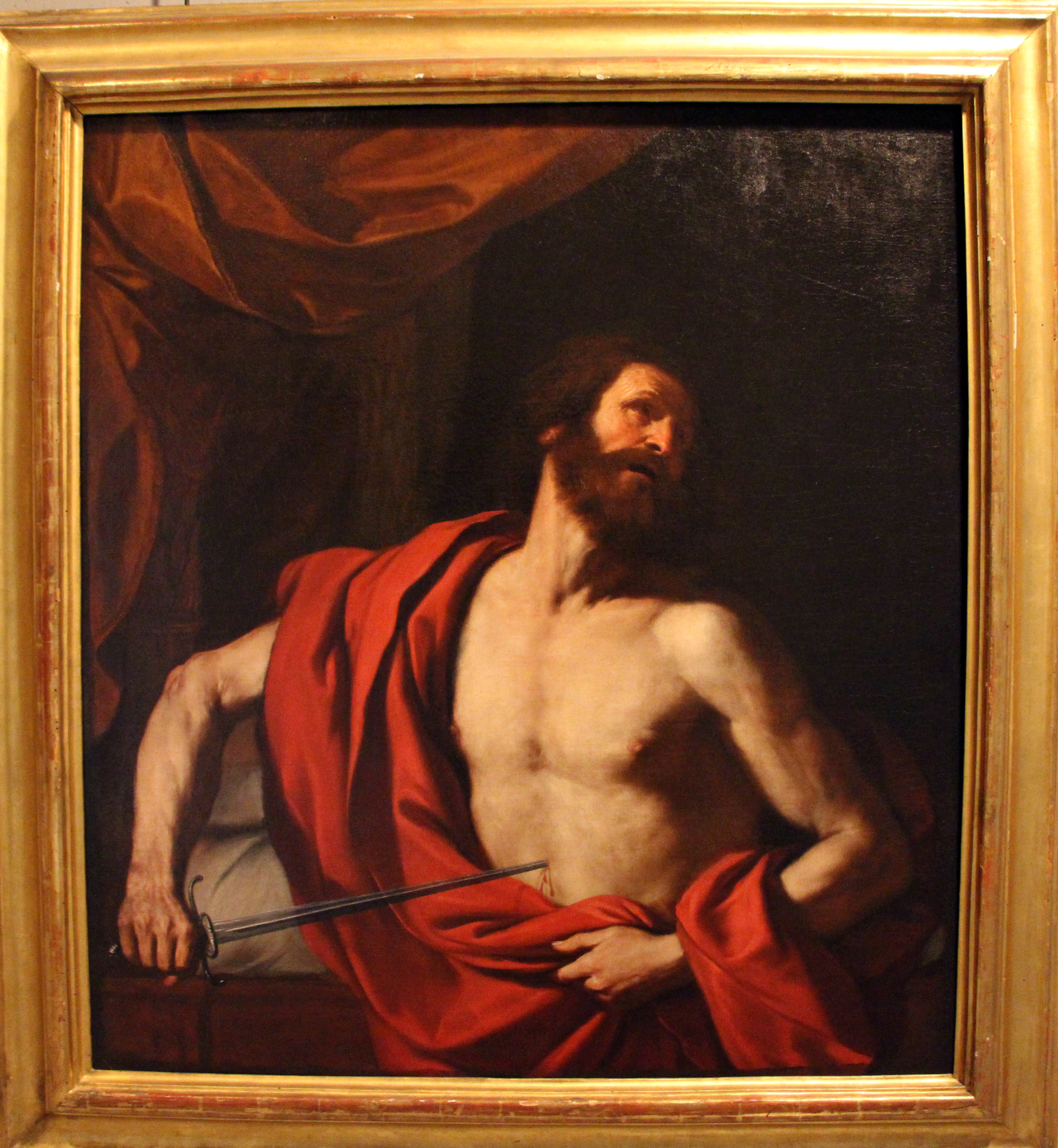
The Suicide of Cato (1641) by Guercino

The Suicide of Cato is a 1641 oil on canvas painting, now in the Palazzo Rosso in Genoa.

== History ==
Showing Cato the Younger, it was commissioned by Marcantonio Eugenio, a lawyer from Perugia active in Rome. A note in the painter's payment book refers to a sum equivalent to 15 scudi paid to him for the work on 22 November 1640, with the balance settled on 7 December 1641 with 45 scudi. It was a pendant to a now lost Death of Seneca, also valued at 60 scudi and also received by Eugenio in 1643 - that subject was popular in Guercino's oeuvre and he produced another version for cardinal Antonio Barberini for 75 scudi. The Suicide of Cato appeared in 18th century inventories of the Brignole collection until being donated to the city by Maria Brignole Sale, the last surviving member of that family.
