= Maria-Pia Victoria-Feser =

Swiss statistician (born 1965)

- Education: University of Geneva (Ph.D.)
- Known for: Robust statistics; Generalized method of wavelet moments
- Awards: Latsis Foundation International Prize; SNSF professorships
- Scientific career
- Fields: Statistics
- Institutions: University of Geneva; London School of Economics; University of Bologna
- Thesis: Robust Methods for Personal Income Distribution Models (1995)
- Website: https://www.unibo.it/sitoweb/maria.victoriafeser/en

Maria-Pia Victoria-Feser (born 24 September 1965) is a Swiss statistician who develops methods for statistical inference with applications to research fields ranging from social, economics (econometrics) to experimental sciences (biostatistics). She has been a professor in the Geneva School of Economics and Management until 2023, part of the University of Geneva, and was the founding dean of the school. She is now a professor in the Department of Statistics, part of the University of Bologna.

== Education and career ==
Victoria-Feser earned a master's degree in econometrics from the University of Geneva in 1989. In 1993, she completed her Ph.D. at the University of Geneva, in econometrics and statistics. She received in 1995 the Latsis Foundation International Prize for her dissertation, Robust Methods for Personal Income Distribution Models (supervised by Elvezio Ronchetti).

After working for three years as a lecturer at the London School of Economics (department of statistics), she returned to the University of Geneva in 1997, in the faculty of psychology and educational sciences. She was awarded, in 2000, the professorial fellowships from the Swiss National Science Foundation, became a full professor in the Department of Hautes Études Commerciales (HEC Genève) in 2001, and dropped her affiliation with psychology and educational sciences in 2005. In 2013, the department merged with the Department of Economics to become the Geneva School of Economics and Management, and she was its founding dean from 2013 to 2017. After working part time for many years she received a permanent full time position in 2018. In November 2023, she was nominated full professor in the Department of Statistics at the University of Bologna.

Within the University of Geneva, Victoria-Feser has led the creation of institutes and programs for research and teaching in statistical sciences. In particular, she founded the Research Centre for Statistics (2011), the masters program in statistics (2006), the Ph.D. program in statistics (2009) and the masters program in business analytics (2017) with a public-private partnership with the multinational companies association established in the Geneva region.

== Research activities ==
Victoria-Feser develops statistical methods that concern, in particular, robust statistics, model selection, prediction, resampling (statistics) methods, time series, generalized linear model and generalized latent variable model. She has published scientific articles in internationally recognized reviews such as the Journal of the American Statistical Association, the Journal of the Royal Statistical Society (statistical methodology), Econometrica, the Annals of Applied Statistics and the Journal of Business & Economic Statistics. Part of her research activities have been financed by public founding bodies such as the Swiss National Science Foundation or the Economic and Social Research Council in the UK.

== Book ==
With Stephane Heritier, Eva Cantoni and Samuel Copt, Victoria-Feser is an author of the book Robust Methods in Biostatistics (Wiley, 2009).
