= Francesco Maria Cantoni =

18th-century Italian-Swiss stucco artist

- Born: February 22, 1699; Genoa, Republic of Genoa
- Died: July 18, 1772 (aged 73); Cabbio, Swiss Confederation
- Occupation: Stucco artist
- Known for: Decorative work in Liguria, Lombardy, Belgium, and Germany
- Spouse: Maria Caterina Fontana
- Children: Pietro Matteo Cantoni, Rocco Cantoni, Giovanni Battista Cantoni, Giacomo Cantoni
- Parent(s): Pietro Cantoni, Caterina Fontana

Francesco Maria Cantoni (22 February 1699 – 18 July 1772) was a Swiss stucco artist active in Liguria and Lombardy, as well as in the Austrian Netherlands and other parts of the Holy Roman Empire. Born in the Republic of Genoa and originally from Cabbio in the Valle di Muggio, he became one of the major figures in 18th-century decorative arts, working on prestigious palaces and churches throughout his career.

== Early life and family ==
Francesco Maria Cantoni was the youngest child of Pietro Cantoni and his second wife Caterina Fontana, daughter of Giovanni Battista Fontana, who was active in construction. After Pietro's death in 1700, financial constraints forced Caterina and her children to return to Cabbio, where Francesco Maria spent his childhood and adolescence in the Valle di Muggio.

In 1723, he married Maria Caterina Fontana, daughter of Rocco Fontana, a master builder active in Rome. The couple had four sons: Pietro Matteo, Rocco, Giovanni Battista and Giacomo Cantoni, who later consolidated the family workshop's reputation and maintained the relationships their father had established with major patrons.

== Career ==
Around the age of 20, Francesco Maria Cantoni returned to Genoa to complete his apprenticeship as a stucco artist, a craft for which he showed great aptitude. He became one of the major practitioners in the art of stucco work and was commissioned to decorate the most prestigious palaces and churches in the city, as well as country residences and oratories in the nearby Genoese hinterland, working with the local maestranze (craftsmen's guilds).

=== Major works ===
Among his numerous works, carried out in collaboration with important architects, fresco painters and specialists in architectural perspective (quadratura), were the chapel of the Moro family in the church of Saint-Étienne at Mossanzonico (near Dongo in the Como region, 1724) and the stucco work in the churches of Santa Chiara and Sant'Ambrogio in Genoa (1724-1725), where the painters Francesco Costa and Lorenzo De Ferrari worked respectively. Cantoni also participated in the construction of the mirror gallery of the Palazzo Balbi-Durazzo, now Palazzo Reale (1725).

He created the altar of the church of the Holy Spirit (1728) and undertook the complete decoration of the noble church of San Torpete (1732-1733, designed by architect Giovanni Antonio Ricca the Younger, with whom he collaborated for many years), as well as the chapels of the church of San Rocco at Ognio in the Val Fontanabuona (1734).

=== International work ===
Between 1738 and 1741, probably at the invitation of the Moretti family, master builders and stucco artists active in Germany and Belgium, Francesco Maria Cantoni traveled with his eldest son Pietro Matteo to Aix-la-Chapelle, Malmedy and Liège, where he executed the stucco work on the ceiling of the Council Palace.

=== Later career ===
Upon returning to Genoa, he decorated the façades of the Palazzo Rosso (1743, creating the leonine protomes) and the pleasure villa at Albaro, residences of the Brignole Sale marquises. Later, he worked on three salons of the Palazzo Ferretto (1753) and worked again at the Palazzo Balbi-Durazzo (1755).

Francesco Maria Cantoni returned definitively to Cabbio in 1756, where he died in 1772.

== Bibliography ==
- Leoncini, Luca: Museo di Palazzo Reale, Genova. Catalogo generale, vol. 3, 2012.
- Bianchi, Stefania: I cantieri dei Cantoni. Relazioni, opere, vicissitudini di una famiglia della Svizzera italiana in Liguria (secoli XVI-XVIII), 2013.
