= Federal Business Census =

Swiss business survey

The Federal Business Census (FBC) is a survey covering all second and third sector businesses and enterprises throughout Switzerland. The survey is conducted by the Swiss Federal Statistical Office (FSO) with the support of regional statistical offices. The aim of the survey is to collect complete data from all economic production units on economic, social and regional aspects. The BC is used to update the Business and Enterprise Register (BER), and serves as a reference for various statistics.

The BC is a complete survey. Data is collected by means of paper questionnaires, online questionnaires (eSurveys), and profiling (separate collection of data from large (government) administration units and enterprises). Participation in the survey is compulsory.

Data collected includes: locations of businesses, (address), economic activity, and number and names of persons employed by hours of work, sex, and nationality at the communal level (and per hectare for geocoded data).

The census is sanctioned by the Ordinance on the Conduct of Statistical Surveys by the Confederation of 30 June 1993 (RS 431.012.1). The first census took place in 1905. Since then, it has been conducted three times per decade (in all years ending with 1, 5, and 8). Its reference day for any current calendar year is the last working day in September.
