= Eva Cantoni =

Swiss statistician

Eva Cantoni (born 1970) is a Swiss statistician whose research focuses on robust statistics and generalized linear models, with applications including housing market prediction, health care, and livestock production. She is a professor at the University of Geneva, in the Geneva School of Economics and Management, and president of the Swiss Federal Statistics Committee.

== Education and career ==
Cantoni was born in 1970, and received a Ph.D. in mathematics in 1999 from the University of Geneva. Her doctoral dissertation, Resistant Techniques for Nonparametric Regression, Generalized Linear and Additive Models, was supervised by Elvezio Ronchetti.

She became an associate professor at the University of Geneva in 2011, and full professor in 2019. She was vice-dean of the faculty of economy and management from 2020 to 2023, and became president of the Swiss Federal Statistics Committee in 2024.

== Book ==
Cantoni is a coauthor of the book Robust Methods in Biostatistics (with Stephane Heritier, Samuel Copt, and Maria-Pia Victoria-Feser, Wiley, 2009).

== Recognition ==
In 2025, the Geneva School of Economics and Management gave Cantoni their inaugural GSEM Teaching Engagement Award.
