= Total Social Security Accounts =

The Total Social Security Accounts are a synthesis statistic used in Switzerland to gauge expenditures and their financing in social security.

These accounts are compiled from statistical sources such as the profit and loss accounts of social insurances, the Public Finance Statistics [EFS], and the Swiss Social Insurance Statistics [SVS],

== Description ==
On the expenditure side, the Total Social Security Accounts focus on social benefits and on the revenue side on employers' social security contributions, individual compulsory health insurance premiums, public funding and investment income. Figuratively speaking, the Total Social Security Accounts consist of a sub-structure and a superstructure, with the sub-structure comprising the absolute value of the revenues and expenditures and the superstructure the indicators into which the absolute values can be processed.

The Total Social Security Accounts are internationally comparable, as they are based on the European System of Integrated Social Protection Statistics (ESSPROS) developed by Eurostat.

In 2007, total expenditure on social security in Switzerland rose to CHF 142.4 billion (2006: CHF 137.2 billion). Revenues in 2007 amounted to CHF 167.29 billion. In 2008, total expenditure amounted to CHF 143.6 billion and revenues to CHF 154.18 billion.

== Legal basis ==
The legal bases of the Total Social Security Accounts are the National Council's Postulate of the Committee for Social Security and Health of 17 February 1995 and Art 10, Para. 2 of the Federal Statistics Act of 9 October 1992.

== Type of survey ==
In Switzerland, the first attempts to arrive at an overall picture of the finances of social security go back to the 1970s and 1980s. A direct forerunner of today's synthetic statistic was the "Social Budget of Switzerland", which P. Gilliand and S. Rossini developed for the years 1990 and 1993 as part of the National Science Foundation's "Changing Ways of Life and Social Security" project. Methodologically, this work was based on the ESSPROS which was applicable at the time.

In 1995, S. Greppi updated the "Social Budget of Switzerland". The following year, Eurostat published a new ESSPROS. As far as the comparability of the Swiss Total Social Security Accounts with the total social security accounts of EU countries is concerned, the FSO adopted the methodological guidelines of this new manual without making any changes. Benefits that are not taken account of in the ESSPROS concept are calculated and reported separately.

== Features registered ==
Data on social security finances for the whole of Switzerland, broken down by institutions (old-age, disability insurance, etc.) are treated and expressed in CHF millions.

For the time being, Total Social Security Account values can only be shown at national level. But available data also make it possible to show a large proportion of social benefits at the cantonal level. Most of the indicators developed on the basis of the Total Social Security Accounts also meet the criterion of international comparability. At present, international comparisons include most EU and EFTA countries.

== Period conducted ==
The Total Social Security Accounts are compiled every year by the Federal Statistical Office. The 2003 edition provided for the first time information on almost all categories of the Total Security Accounts going back to the 1950s. However, the estimates for the decades between 1950 and 1990 are not as precise as those for the years since then.
