= Swiss Labour Force Survey =

The Swiss Labour Force Survey (SLFS) - conducted by the Federal Statistical Office in cooperation with an external service provider - is a household survey that has been conducted since 1991. The main goal is to survey the employment structure and employment behaviour of the permanent resident population. Because of the strict application of international definitions in the SLFS, Swiss data can be compared with those of other OECD countries and the countries of the European Union. Since 2010, the SLFS has been conducted on a quarterly basis. The interviews from the third and fourth quarters of 2009 serve as a transition from the old to the new (continuous) SLFS.

== Legal basis ==
Ordinance on the Conduct of Statistical Surveys by the Confederation of 30 June 1993, SR 431.012.1

== Type of survey ==
The SLFS is a sample survey. The survey is carried out as a telephone household survey among a sample of approximately 105,000 people (until 2001: approx. 16,000; from 2002 to 2009: approx. 35,000 persons). The households are selected at random from the telephone directory. Since 2003, the SLFS has also been supplemented with foreign nationals in the permanent resident population selected from the Central Migration Information System (CEMIS). Until 2009, this supplementary segment comprised 15,000 persons; since 2010, it has comprised 21,000 persons. The respondents are interviewed four times over a period of one and a half years.

== Features registered ==
The SLFS is a survey of the permanent resident population aged 15 and over carried out at the national level as well as at the level of Switzerland's major regions. The survey collects data on employment (present and past), reasons for economic inactivity (retirement, education, etc.), learned and practised profession, place of work and volume, working conditions (working hours, night work, weekend work), economic branch, employment and household income, job search (unemployment, underemployment), professional and geographical mobility, education and training, unpaid work (family and household work, volunteer activities, support from relatives, etc.), migration and social security.

== Date survey conducted ==
The first survey took place in 1991. Until 2008, the survey was conducted in the second quarter, and in 2009 in the second, third and fourth quarters. Since 2010, it has been continuous. Until 2009, the data were evaluated annually; since 2010, they have been evaluated on a quarterly basis.

== Footnotes and references ==
- Federal Statistical Office (FSO), Swiss Labour Force Survey, Overview

== See also ==
- Labour Force Survey
