= Statistical Yearbook of Switzerland =

The Statistical Yearbook of Switzerland (German/French) published by the Federal Statistical Office has been the standard reference book for Swiss statistics since 1891. It summarises the most important statistical findings on Switzerland's population, society, government, economy and environment. It serves not only as a reference book, but also provides through a series of overview articles, a comprehensive picture of the social and economic situation of Switzerland.

== History ==
The desirability of having a statistical yearbook was expressed for the first time on 29 June 1887. The Federal Council agreed to consider implementing this proposal, but before publishing the Yearbook it wanted to wait until the results of the 1888 census were available so they could be included in it (which subsequently proved to be only partially possible).

Two years later, on 22 July 1889, the Director of the Statistical Bureau, Dr. Guillaume, presented a yearbook proposal divided into six theses to the Conference of Swiss statisticians in Aarau, which was adopted after a short discussion. The first thesis described the purpose of the publication: the Yearbook was supposed to inform the general public about the main results of Swiss statistics in easy-to-understand tables and comparable time series. Guillaume indicated that he had modelled the Statistical Yearbook of Switzerland on the Statistical Yearbook of Finland (a thin bilingual booklet) and the Statistical Yearbook of the German Reich (a more comprehensive volume with coloured maps).

On 18 October 1890, Guillaume presented an outline of the Yearbook's chapters as well as a draft chapter to the Conference of Swiss statisticians for consultation.

The first Statistical Yearbook of Switzerland, weighing in at 270 pages, was published on 8 April 1891. Apparently the response was mostly positive and the first edition seemed to live up to the expectations that might be made upon such a publication.

=== Development over 100 years ===
The concept adopted in the early days of the Statistical Yearbook, which aimed to make information available not just to specialists but to the public at large, corresponds to modern principles of statistical dissemination. This explains a certain similarity in the way information has been presented for more than 100 years: for example, the first edition already contained a visualisation of statistics in a series of thematic maps; and the 1897 edition was a graphic volume. By 1892, the "text" element also featured more prominently in the Yearbook.

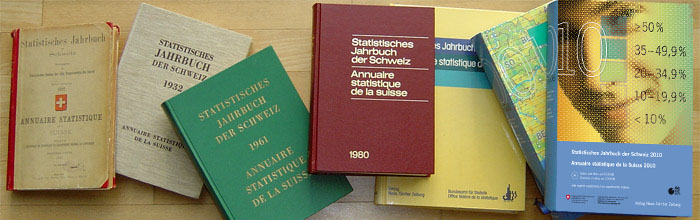
Statistical Yearbooks of Switzerland

But not all editions of the Yearbook were modern in the sense described above: for several decades, volumes consisting purely of tables were published; text and graphs were dispensed with, not least for cost considerations. It was only for the 96th edition in 1989 that clear steps were outlined to make the Yearbook more easily comprehensible and user-friendly again. As Federal Councillor Cotti put it in the foreword, the new design aimed "to bring statistics closer to the citizen". In 2001, the Statistical Yearbook was redesigned again: the current edition is a 900-page four-colour volume with an integrated CD-ROM which includes not only data, but (since 2003), an interactive atlas as well.

== Current concept ==
The chapters of today's Yearbook, which correspond to the topics covered by official statistics, are divided into four parts:

1. "Overview". Each overview text presents a summary of key findings, analyses long-term trends and explains links between various indicators. This section, which also contains numerous graphics, is aimed at a wide audience, but is also intended to provide a useful overview for more specialised groups such as media people and politicians.
2. The "Surveys, Sources" section briefly describes the most important data sources.
3. The "Glossary" defines key terms.
4. Finally, the "Data" section corresponds to a classical statistical yearbook and remains the largest section. It mainly contains tables as well as some graphics and thematic maps.

=== CD-ROM ===
The Statistical Yearbook CD-ROM (which is not sold separately) contains:

1. The "digital Statistical Yearbook of Switzerland" – an interactive application that allows easy navigation and searching of the electronic versions of all texts, tables, graphs and maps of the printed yearbook. These are complemented by a considerable number of tables – notably with cantonal and communal-level data.
2. Two interactive atlases: the "Statistical Atlas of Switzerland" and ("as of the 2011 edition") the "Statistical Atlas of Europe"

A full description and instructions on how to use all applications can be found on the CD-ROM.

== Yearbook archive ==
Thanks to close cooperation with the Federal Office of Information Technology, Systems and Telecommunication (FOITT), the FSO also makes available an "electronic version of all editions of the Yearbook from 1891 to 1957" – a useful and interesting source for historians, students and all other interested persons.

The files are in PDF format and show the original typography, but electronic search options make it possible to consult the texts as easily as in a modern electronic publication. The files are quite large (between 16 and 50 MB!), but with a high-speed internet connection downloading them should not cause any problems.

== Statistical Data on Switzerland ==
"Statistical Data on Switzerland" is a clearly presented booklet which is updated every year and is intended to provide an "iron ration" of the most important key figures for Switzerland. This 50-page free publication in A5 format fits in a coat pocket and includes the most important information on Switzerland's geography, population, employment and income, economy, transport, social security, education and science. The "Statistical Data on Switzerland" is published in five languages: German, French, Italian, Romansh and English.

== Notes and references ==
- Official web site of the Federal Statistical Office (FSO)
