= Federal Statistics Committee (Switzerland) =

Advisory body

The Swiss Federal Statistics Committee (FStatC) is an advisory body for the Federal Council, the Federal Statistical Office and other statistics producers of the Confederation. It includes high-ranking representatives from the cantons and municipalities, from the economy, social partners, the scientific world, the Swiss National Bank as well as from the federal administration. The committee was established with the nomination of its members by the Federal Council on 10 November 1993. Its legal basis is the Federal Statistical Act of 9 October 1992 and the Ordinance of 30 June 1993 on the Conduct of Federal Statistical Surveys.

The Federal Statistics Committee reports to the Federal Department of Home Affairs. The presidency is held by a representative from the scientific world and the Committee usually convenes three times a year.

== Duties and responsibilities of the Federal Statistical Committee ==
Central to the Federal Statistical Committee's work is the accompaniment and monitoring of the multi-annual programme for federal statistics. Amongst other things this also includes the preparation of an annual report to the Federal Council on the current situation and new developments in federal statistics.

The Federal Statistical Committee is also responsible for the adoption of recommendations and guidelines developed by the FSO as well as the appraisal of propositions on the introduction, abolition or modification of the most important statistics and on major transdisciplinary projects.

Furthermore, the Federal Statistical Committee is also responsible for encouraging the collaboration and coordination of official statistics producers as well as assessing policy on the dissemination of statistical information.

On a more general note, the role of the Federal Statistical Committee is to ensure that official statistics meet the requirements of a democratic society and to help predict what demands will be made upon statistical information in the future.

=== Statistical multi-annual programme ===
In collaboration with the other statistical bodies of the Confederation and in consultation with the interested parties for each legislative period, the Federal Statistical Office produces a multi-annual programme of statistical activities at federal level. The multi-annual programme finds its legal basis in the Federal Statistical Act and aims to ensure transparent and comprehensive planning of federal statistics. It provides information on the most important federal statistics work, the current financial and human resources outlay of the Confederation, and planned cooperation with partners abroad. In addition, it enables Parliament to monitor the statistical work planned in relation to its political goals and to comment on this.
