= Tammy Cantoni =

Australian pool and snooker player

Personal information
- Born: 1972 (age 53–54) Australia

Sport
- Country: Australia
- Sport: Snooker

Tammy Cantoni (born 25 August 1972) is an Australian semi-professional pool and snooker player. She won the National championships in women's divisions in snooker (2004) and nine-ball (8 times from 1995 to 2009). She was the runner-up in the 2009 open (mixed-gender) division of the Australian Nine-ball Championship and in 2010 was listed 56th in the World Pool Billiard Association women rankings.

== Biography ==
Cantoni, who began playing pool at age 8, began tournament competition at age 19, and won the first local tournament she ever entered. She went on to win her first attempt at a national title, at age 22, in 1995. She was ranked the 13th top woman player in the world by the World Pool-Billiard Association in 2000. Cantoni has competed in some events classified as professional or open-to-professionals, such as WBA championships, and others classified as amateur, including those sanctioned by the IBSF. The VNEA classified her as a professional as early as 2001, if not earlier but dropped her from their pro list in 2004.

Cantoni won numerous regional women's-division titles, and has often represented her home country internationally. She is a three-time New South Wales state eight-ball champion (1995, 1998, 1999); NSW nine-ball champion (1999); seven-time participant in the WPA World Nine-ball Championship as a representative of Australia (1995–2000, 2004); representative for Australia at the 2001 World Games; eight-time Trans-Tasman Cup representative on Team Australia (1995, 1996, 1997, 2000, 2001, 2002, 2003, 2004); five-time VNEA International Championship representative on Team Australia (1996, 1997, 1998, 1999, 2000); Amarda eight-ball champion (1993, 1995, 1997), Lord Mayor's Cup winner (1998, 1999), Christmas Shield winner (1996, 1997, 2000); 2000 winner of the Australia Day Championship (eight-ball), Millennium Cup (snooker), Easter Cup (eight-ball), and Oceania Championship (eight-ball); and 2001 Oceania Nine-ball Champion.

== Titles and accomplishments ==
Outcome	No.	Year	Championship
Winner	1	1995	Australian Nine-ball Championship (women's division)
Winner	2	1996	Australian Nine-ball Championship (women's division, reigning)
Runner-up	3	1997	Australian Nine-ball Championship (women's division)
Winner	4	1999	Winner, Australian Nine-ball Championship (women's division)
Winner	5	2000	Winner, Australian Nine-ball Championship (women's division, reigning)
Winner	6	2001	Winner, Australian Nine-ball Championship (women's division, reigning)

As of 2009, Cantoni's major cue sports titles include:

Outcome	No.	Year	Championship
Winner	1	2004	Australian Nine-ball Championship (women's division)
Winner	2	2004	Australian Snooker Championship (women's division)
Winner	3	2005	Australian Nine-ball Championship (women's division, reigning)
Runner-up	4	2006	Australian Nine-ball Championship (women's division)
Runner-up	5	2007	Australian Nine-ball Championship (women's division, reigning)
Runner-up	6	2009	Australian Nine-ball Championship (open division)
Winner	7	2009	Australian Nine-ball Championship (women's division)
