= Pietro Cantoni =

17th-century Swiss-Italian architect and builder

- Born: February 25, 1648; Cabbio, Switzerland
- Died: February 20, 1700 (aged 51); Genoa, Republic of Genoa
- Occupations: Architect, Master builder
- Spouse(s): Maria Domenica Grigo (m. 1677; died 1692) Caterina Fontana (m. 1694; died 1700)
- Children: Marc'Antonio, Taddeo, Giuseppe Maria, Francesco Maria
- Parent(s): Taddeo Cantoni (father); Anna Baruzzi (mother)
- Family: Cantoni family

Pietro Cantoni (25 February 1648 – 20 February 1700) was a Swiss-Italian architect and master builder from Cabbio in the Valle di Muggio, active primarily in Genoa during the late 17th century. He was a prominent representative of the maestranze (skilled craftsmen) from Valle di Muggio who worked extensively in Liguria, contributing to major architectural projects for Genoese nobility following the 1684 bombardment of Genoa.

== Early life and family ==
Pietro Cantoni was the eldest son of Taddeo Cantoni, a master builder, and Anna Baruzzi, daughter of Antonio Baruzzi, a stucco worker from Caneggio. At the age of 12, he left for Genoa to learn his father's trade.

In 1677, Pietro married Maria Domenica Grigo, daughter of Marc'Antonio Grigo of Muggio, from a family well known in the architectural circles of Liguria. Their descendants adopted the double surname Cantoni Grigo. The marriage produced four children, including Marc'Antonio, who founded the Muggio branch later made famous by brothers Simone and Gaetano Cantoni, and Taddeo, who remained connected to the Cabbio branch. After Maria Domenica's death in 1692, Pietro married Caterina Fontana in 1694. She was 24 years old and the daughter of Giovanni Battista Fontana, also active in construction. Unlike his first wife, who had remained in Valle di Muggio, Caterina followed him to Genoa, where she gave birth to Giuseppe Maria and Francesco Maria Cantoni. While his brothers married Ligurian women, Pietro maintained ties with compatriot families through both marriages, perpetuating the Cantoni presence in the valley.

== Career in Genoa ==
Between 1677 and 1692, Pietro Cantoni alternated short winter stays at his paternal home with work on construction sites in Liguria. His activity became increasingly demanding and important, particularly after the naval bombardment of Genoa ordered by Louis XIV in 1684. He worked for major families of the Genoese nobility and patriciate, including the Serra, Rivarola, Pallavicini, Lomellini, Grimaldi, Raggio, and Spinola families, initially undertaking renovations and improvements, then more prestigious projects.

On construction sites, Cantoni could rely not only on collaboration with his brothers Domenico and Antonio Cantoni and other relatives and compatriots, but also on support from local artists and craftsmen or those from the Italian Lakes region (maestranze), such as master builders Paolo Delle Piane, Giacomo Lagomaggiore, and Giacomo Viano.

== Investments and property ==
Cantoni invested his substantial income not only in purchasing buildings in Genoa, but also in renovating and embellishing his paternal home in Genoese style (1685–1691; since 2003 the seat of the Ethnographic Museum of Val Muggio) as well as acquiring a mill that had belonged to the Fontana family (1686) and a large farm in Morbio Inferiore (1694). These investments clearly demonstrate his intention to return to the valley to spend his old age there.

In reality, he returned to Cabbio for the last time in 1694 for his marriage to Caterina Fontana. Pietro Cantoni died in Genoa in 1700 at just over 50 years of age.

== Bibliography ==
- Bianchi, Stefania: I cantieri dei Cantoni. Relazioni, opere, vicissitudini di una famiglia della Svizzera italiana in Liguria (secoli XVI-XVIII), 2013.
