= Achille Cantoni =

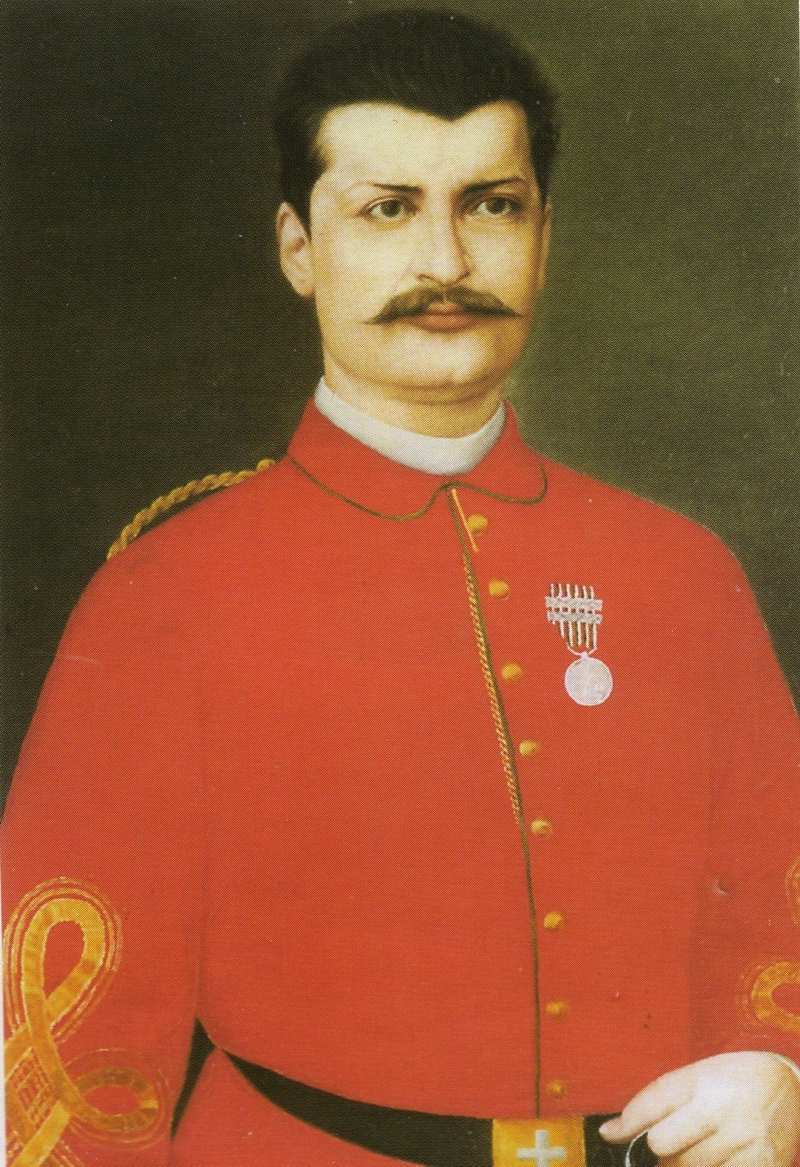
Achille Cantoni Achille Cantoni

Personal details
- Born: 1835 Forlì, Italy
- Died: 3 November 1867 Mentana, Italy

Achille Cantoni (1835 – 3 November 1867) was an Italian war volunteer who fought in the Second and Third Italian Wars of Independence. He is credited with saving the life of Giuseppe Garibaldi, an Italian general and central figure of the Risorgimento, during a battle in the town of Velletri in 1849. He died at the Battle of Mentana on November 3, 1867. After his death, Giuseppe Garibaldi wrote a novel entitled Cantoni il volontario in his honor.

== Personal life ==
Achille Cantoni was born in Forlì, Italy, in 1835. Although Cantoni was a real volunteer during the Italian Risorgimento, little else is known of his origins. Much of what is known about him comes from Giuseppe Garibaldi's novel, Cantoni il volontario, a work of historical fiction. According to the novel, Cantoni had a lover who fought alongside him as a volunteer named Ida. Cantoni and Ida were 15 and 14 years old, respectively, when they met.

== Wars of Italian Unification ==
Achille Cantoni was only 15 years old when joined as a volunteer with the patriotic forces of Italy, or the Redshirts. He was likely part of Garibaldi's military corps Hunters of the Alps, which brought together Italian volunteers to fight in the Second Italian War of Independence (also known as the Franco-Austrian War) and the Third Italian War of Independence. Cantoni fought in both of these wars. These two wars were among the many battles fought as a part of the Italian Unification effort, which sought to bring together the many states of the Italian Peninsula into one country as the Kingdom of Italy.

What makes Cantoni significant is his defense and rescue of one of the most important figures of the Risorgimento, Giuseppe Garibaldi. On May 19, 1849, in the town of Velletri, a battle commenced between Italy and the Spanish Bourbon Neapolitan forces. Cantoni saved Garibaldi's life by shielding him with his own body. Awestruck, Garibaldi himself called him “Cantoni, the brave volunteer of Forlì… favorite son of Romagna.”

== Cantoni il volontario ==
On November 3, 1867, Cantoni followed the Italian volunteers under the command of Giuseppe Garibaldi into the Battle of Mentana against the French. The battle was an ill-fated disaster for the Italians. Along with many other volunteers, Cantoni was killed in action.

Giuseppe Garibaldi so greatly admired Cantoni and his efforts that, following Cantoni's death, he wrote the novel Cantoni il volontario, published in Milan in 1870, in honor of the man who saved his life. Rather than an exact retelling of his life and accomplishments, Garibaldi instead used Cantoni as a character in a fictionalized tale of his heroism. Though the novel is fictional, the figure of Cantoni is set against real occurrences during the Risorgimento. Set in 1848-1849, the book tells of Cantoni's bravery and dedication through many battles and events. Garibaldi highly romanticizes Cantoni as a heroic figure. He also addresses Cantoni's lover, Ida, who fought alongside him as a volunteer herself. Cantoni eventually dies at the end of the novel, nobly defending the honor of his country.

However, the novel's focus is not entirely on Cantoni. Garibaldi used the novel to publicize his opinions and ideas on politics and religion. For instance, he writes about his idea of the ideal Italian volunteer. Volunteers were more than just citizens willing to fight for their country, but rather became heralded icons of the nation. They fought for Italy by their own choice and put their country before anything else as their main priority. The Italian people greatly admired these volunteers, as did Garibaldi. The novel also shows Garibaldi's anti-clericalism, a result of his frustrations with the Catholic Church and the First Vatican Council in Rome. He considered the Papal Theocracy “the plague of the World” and portrayed members of the church as evil villains in his novel. One character, a Jesuit priest named Fra Gaudenzio, attempts to rape Ida while she is imprisoned. Another anti-clerical scene describes the papal dungeons as horrific and filthy. Cantoni and the other volunteers’ battle for Italy is designed to be against pretismo (“priestism”) and politicians.
