= Giulio Cantoni =

American biochemist (1915–2005)

Giulio Leonardo Cantoni (29 September 1915 – July 25, 2005) was the director of the United States' National Institutes of Health's Laboratory of Cellular Pharmacology, later renamed the Laboratory of General and Comparative Biochemistry.

== Early life ==
Cantoni was born on September 29, 1915, in Italy. He earned a medical degree from the University of Milan in 1938. Shortly after the fascists abolished the parliament and introduced anti-Semitic laws, Cantoni, who was Jewish, fled with his family to England.

As Cantoni was boarding a ship heading for America, World War II broke out. As an Italian citizen, he was interned in England and later in Canada. Eventually, he was released and allowed to go to the United States in July 1941. After the war, Cantoni wrote a book about his journey during World War II called From Milano to New York; By Way of Hell: Fascism and the Odyssey of a Young Italian Jew.

== Career ==
Cantoni secured a job at University of Michigan's medical school, where he worked until he became an assistant professor of pharmacology at Long Island College of Medicine in 1945. In 1948, he moved to the American Cancer Society, and after two years, he moved again to Western Reserve University. In 1954, he started the National Institutes of Health's Laboratory of Cellular Pharmacology at the National Institute of Mental Health, where he remained as the director until his retirement in 1994. Cantoni discovered the biological mechanism of methylation using S-adenosylmethionine.

In 1983, he joined the United States National Academy of Sciences.

== Personal life ==
Cantoni married Gabriella. They had two daughters, Allegra and Serena. Cantoni died on July 25, 2005.
