= Federal Statistical Office (Switzerland) =

Switzerland's national competence centre for official statistics

Coordinates: 46.9970°N 6.9379°E

- Bundesamt für Statistik (German); Office fédéral de la statistique (French); Ufficio federale di statistica (Italian); Uffizi federal da statistica (Romansh)

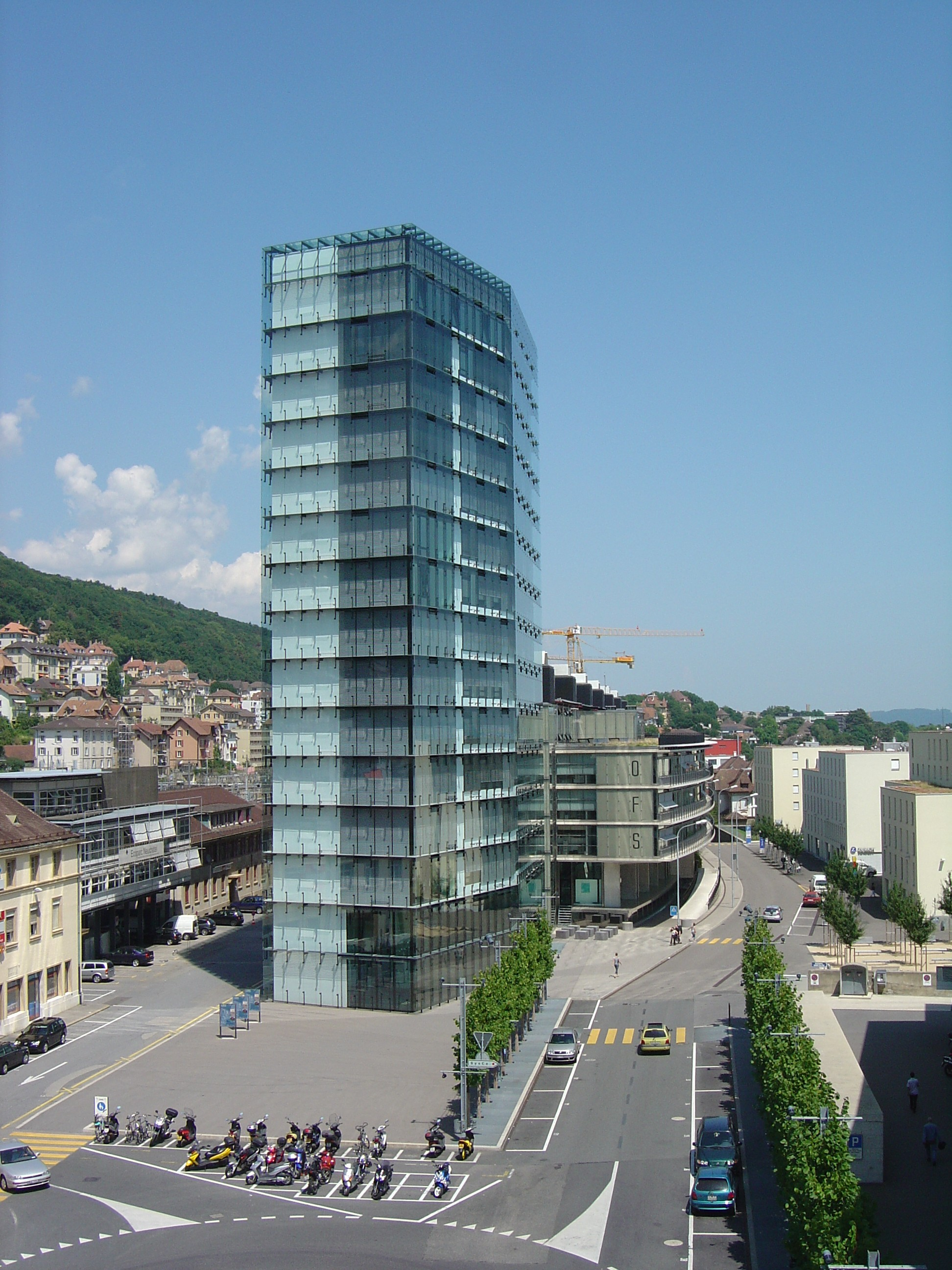
- Headquarters in Neuchâtel

Agency overview
- Formed: 1860; 166 years ago
- Jurisdiction: Federal administration of Switzerland
- Headquarters: Neuchâtel
- Minister responsible: Elisabeth Baume-Schneider, Federal Councillor
- Parent agency: Federal Department of Home Affairs
- Website: www.bfs.admin.ch

The Federal Statistical Office (FSO) (Note: German: Bundesamt für Statistik, French: Office fédéral de la statistique, Italian: Ufficio federale di statistica, Romansh: Uffizi federal da statistica) is a federal agency of the Swiss Confederation. It is the statistics office of Switzerland, situated in Neuchâtel and attached to the Federal Department of Home Affairs.

The Federal Statistical Office is the national service provider and competence centre for statistical observations in areas of national, social, economic and environmental importance. The FSO is the main producer of statistics in the country and runs the Swiss Statistics data pool. It provides information on all subject areas covered by official statistics.

The office is closely linked to the national statistics scene as well as to partners in the worlds of science, business and politics. It works closely with Eurostat, the Statistics Office of the European Union, in order to provide information that is also comparable at an international level.

The key principles upheld by the office throughout its statistical activities are data protection, scientific reliability, impartiality, topicality and service orientation.

== History ==
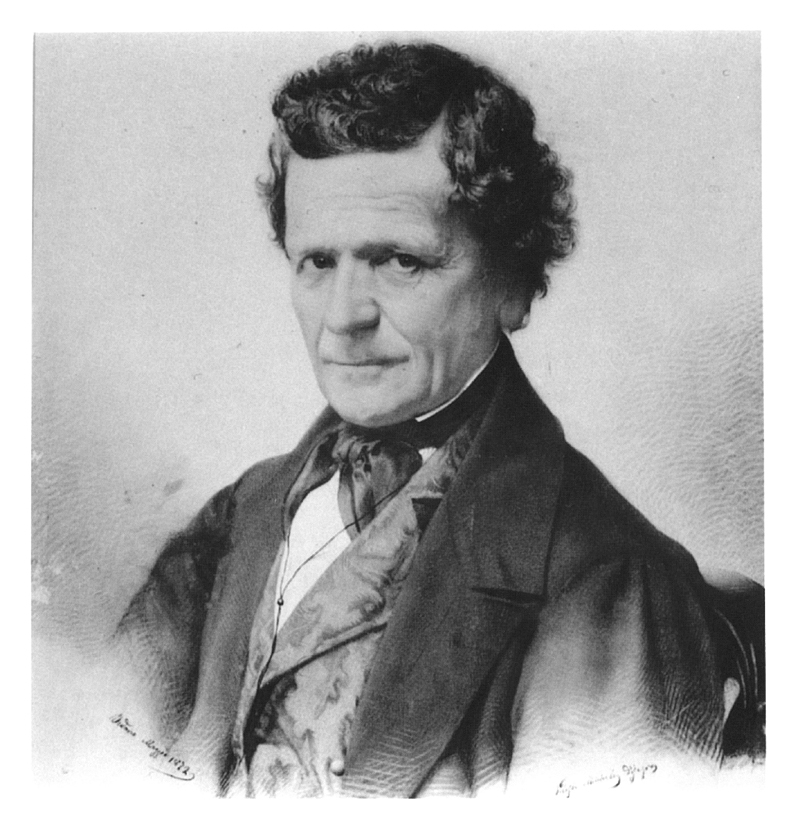
Stefano Franscini, Director of the Department of Home Affairs (1848–1857)

With the founding of the Swiss Federal State in 1848, statistics gained in importance at the national level. In 1849, statistics became the task of the Department of Home Affairs under Federal Councillor Stefano Franscini, who conducted the first population census in the newly founded federal state in 1850. In 1860, the Federal Statistics Bureau (the present Federal Statistical Office) was founded in Bern, where it was located until 1998. Since 1998 all sections of the FSO have been centrally located in one building in Neuchâtel.

In the year of the FSO's foundation, a federal act was passed on the population census to be conducted every ten years. Ten years later the law was extended. In 1870, Parliament approved a brief law confined to organisational issues about "official statistical surveys in Switzerland". In 1992 this was replaced with the more up-to-date Federal Statistics Act. The new Federal Constitution of 1999 included for the first time an article (Art. 65) regarding statistics. In 2002 the Charter of Swiss Public Statistics was approved. One of the aims of the Charter is to establish universal principles that are based upon international standards but that also take particularities of the Swiss statistical system into account. The bilateral cooperation agreement between Switzerland and the European Union in the area of statistics came into force in 2007. The Statistical Yearbook of Switzerland was first published in 1891 and has since then been published without interruption by the FSO. Since 1987, the FSO has been making important statistical information available online in electronic form, and in 1996 this service was extended and the STATINF database and website were added.

== Mission ==
The FSO produces and publishes key statistical information on the current situation and development of the nation and society, of the economy and the environment. It completes these with comprehensive analyses, it creates scenarios of future developments and safeguards historical data.

Various methods are employed for data acquisition: direct interviews, more or less automated observation, analyses of administrative data, complete enumeration surveys and representative sample surveys. The efficiency of modern statistical information systems is largely determined by the type of data acquisition. For legal and financial reasons, preference is given to the systematic use of existent data rather than to new direct surveys with the ensuing burden on those interviewed.

Statistical findings are disseminated in various forms and using varying channels: as tables or indicators accompanied by commentaries or graphs and maps, as printed documents or in electronic form, in standard issue or made-to-measure versions.

The national consumer price index (2005-2010)

Regular FSO surveys (selection):

- Population census
- Business Census
- National consumer price index (CPI)
- Swiss Labour Force Survey (SLFS)
- Swiss Earnings Structure Survey (SESS)

=== Population census ===
The first federal population census took place in March 1850 under the direction of Federal Councillor Stefano Franscini. As well as counting the number of inhabitants, these were also asked about their sex, age, marital status, profession, occupation and religious denomination. Between 1860 and 2000 a census took place every ten years in December. The only exceptions to this 10-year rhythm were the population census of 1888 (brought forward as basis for the revision of the constituency allocations) and the population census of 1941 (delayed due to the mobilisation of the army in May 1940). The census of 2000 was the last to use traditional methods. As of 2010 a fundamental change has been introduced: The population census, in a new format, will be carried out and analysed annually by the FSO. In order to ease the burden on the population, the information is primarily drawn from population registers and supplemented by sample surveys. Starting this year, only a small proportion of the population (about 5%) will be surveyed in writing or by telephone. The first reference day for the new census will be 31 December 2010.

== Legal basis ==
Public statistics are anchored in the Swiss constitution. In the vote held on 18 April 1999 the Swiss electorate approved a total revision of the constitution, which now includes a statistics article (Art. 65) concerning the commissioning and competence of statistics:

"1 The federal authorities shall collect the necessary statistical data concerning the current status and changes in the population, the economy, society, education, research, territory and environment in Switzerland.

2 They shall be authorised to issue regulations with regard to the harmonisation and management of official registers with a view to minimising the work needed for collecting such information."

The legal basis for public statistics in Switzerland is defined in more detail in various laws, principally in the Federal Statistic Act of 9 October 1992. The Federal Statistical Act provides a legal framework. The Act sets out the tasks and organisation of federal statistics as well as fundamental principles for data acquisition, publications and services. In particular it describes data protection principles. The salient innovations in the 1992 Act are the coordination function of the Swiss Federal Statistical Office in its capacity as the Government's central statistical unit, the establishment of a multi-year statistical programme for overall planning of Swiss statistics, and the institution of the Federal Statistics Commission as an advisory body to the Federal Council (with representatives from academia, business, social partners as well as federal, cantonal and communal units).

== Product range ==
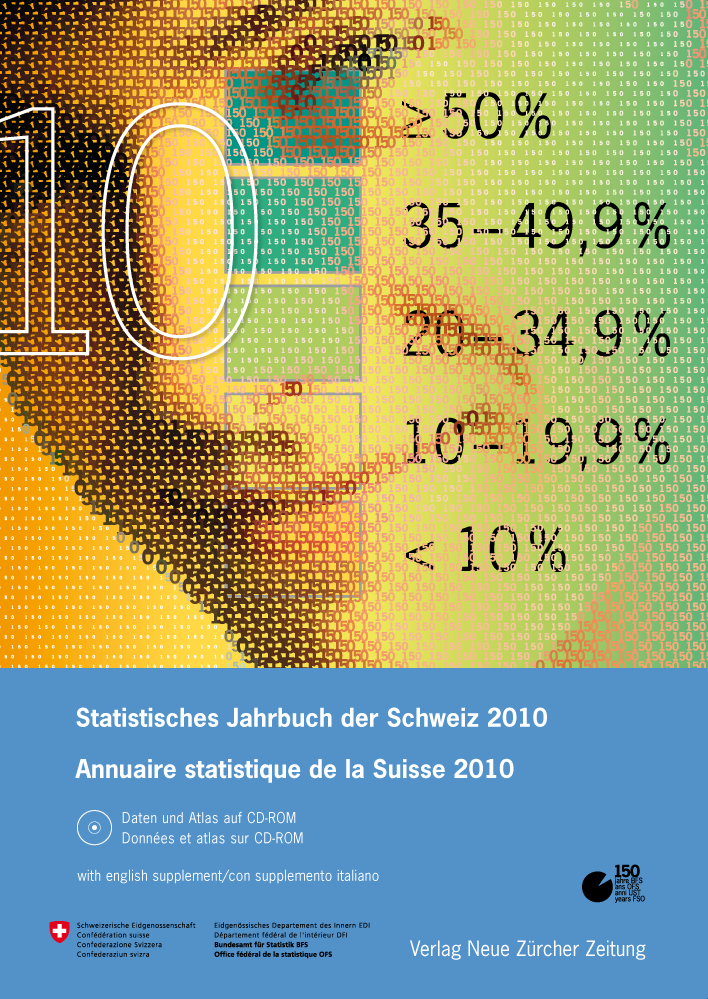
Statistical Yearbook 2010

The Federal Statistical Office (FSO) offers the following products:

- the statistics portal on the internet
- Publications
- spatial analyses in a geographical information system (GIS)
- thematic cartography
- a telephone enquiry service and 24h fax on demand service (national consumer price index)
- an information centre open to the general public (Espace public) in Neuchâtel with library and electronic information
- a specialised range of products for schools with graphs and teaching aids (Schools forum)

The statistics portal (www.statistik.admin.ch) enables key statistical findings to be published quickly. The web site is updated daily. Links and downloads lead straight to the content. RSS subscribers are notified of new statistical results and activities via the portal and thus kept up-to-date.

As far as publications are concerned, the "Statistical Yearbook of Switzerland" (German/French) has been the standard reference book for Swiss statistics since 1891. It contains the most important statistical findings regarding the Swiss population, society, government, economy and environment. In addition to the Yearbook, further FSO printed publications appear on a monthly, three-monthly, six-monthly or annual basis. The Swiss Statistical Lexicon offers a collection of data to be downloaded: there are tables, graphs, maps, texts and whole publications on all statistical topic areas. For specific audiences a range of products on certain themes are available as special applications, databases and also data collections. A fee may be charged for some of these products.

The federal statistics' product range is divided into 22 topic areas (^{*} only available in German and French):

- Basics and Overviews
- Population
- Territory and environment
- Employment and income
- National economy
- Prices
- Industry and services
- Agriculture, forestry
- Energy^{*}
- Construction and housing^{*}
- Tourism^{*}
- Mobility and transport
- Banks and insurance^{*}
- Social security
- Health
- Education and science
- Culture, media, information society, sports^{*}
- Politics^{*}
- Public finance^{*}
- Crime, criminal justice
- Economic and social situation of the population
- Sustainable development

== Full-time positions since 2001 ==
Raw data

"Federal Finance Administration FFA: State financial statements".
"Federal Finance Administration FFA: Data portal".

== See also ==
- Legal basis of official statistics in Switzerland
- Eurostat
- Organisation for Economic Co-operation and Development
- Total Social Security Accounts
- United Nations Economic Commission for Europe
