= Palazzo Rosso =

Historical palace of Genoa, Italy

Palazzo Brignole Sale, known as "Palazzo Rosso"
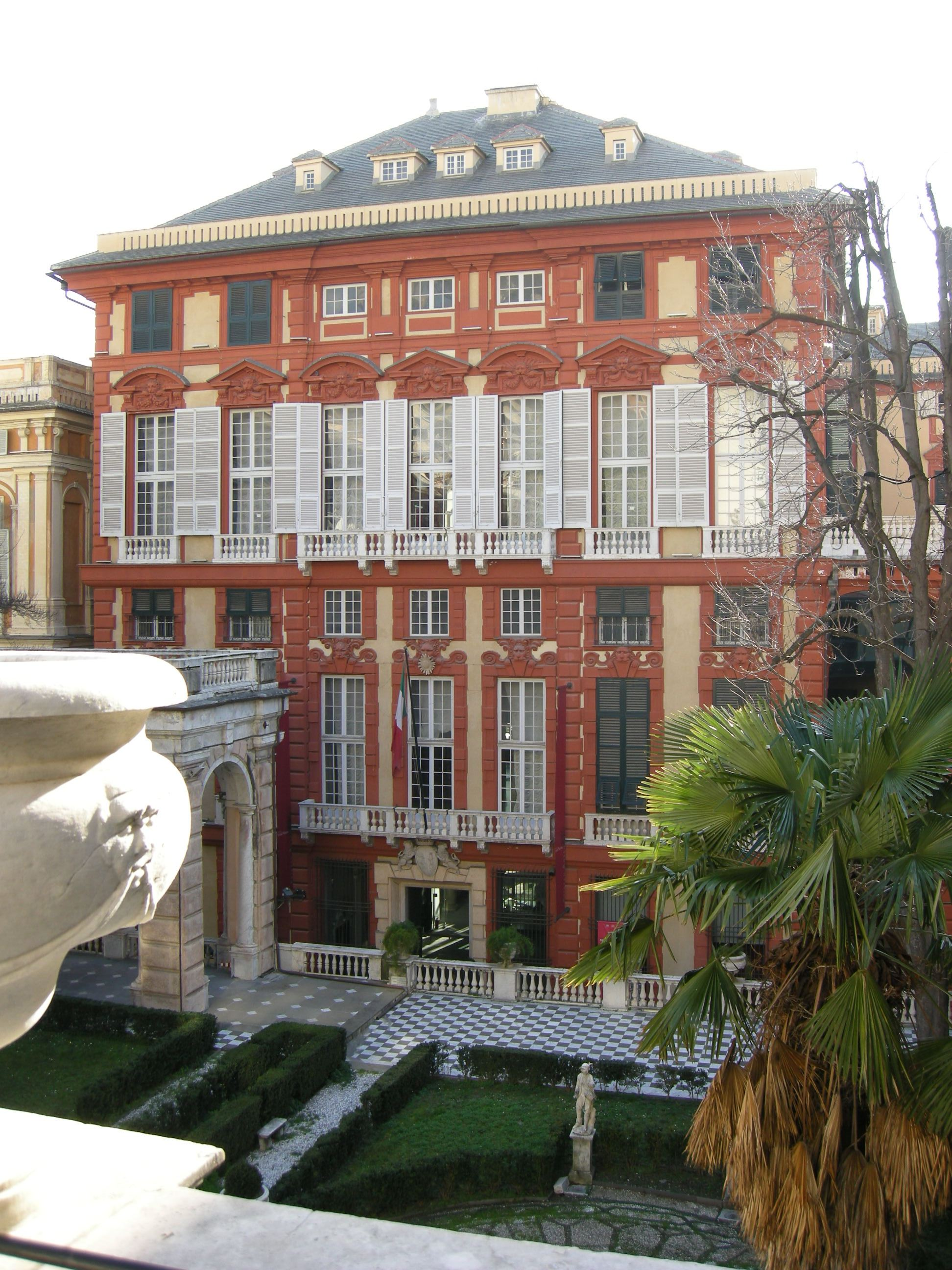
- Facade of Palazzo Brignole Sale, "Palazzo Rosso"
- Interactive map of the Palazzo Brignole Sale, known as "Palazzo Rosso" area

General information
- Status: Intact
- Type: Palace
- Architectural style: Mannerist
- Location: Genoa, Italy, 5, Via Garibaldi
- Coordinates: 44.4113058°N 8.9321265°E
- Current tenants: Strada Nuova Museum - Palazzo Rosso
- Named for: Brignole Sale family
- Construction started: 1675

UNESCO World Heritage Site
- Part of: Genoa: Le Strade Nuove and the system of the Palazzi dei Rolli
- Criteria: Cultural: (ii)(iv)
- Reference: 1211
- Inscription: 2006 (30th Session)

The Palazzo Brignole Sale or Palazzo Rosso is a house museum located in Via Garibaldi, in the historical center of Genoa, in Northwestern Italy. The palace is part of the UNESCO World Heritage Site Genoa: Le Strade Nuove and the system of the Palazzi dei Rolli. The rich art collection inside, along with the galleries of Palazzo Bianco and Palazzo Doria Tursi, is part of the Musei di Strada Nuova and consists of the works of artists of the caliber of Antoon van Dyck, Guido Reni, Paolo Veronese, Guercino, Gregorio De Ferrari, Albrecht Dürer, Bernardo Strozzi and Mattia Preti.

== History ==
Built in 1675, Palazzo Rosso was not one of the 163 Palazzi dei Rolli of Genoa, the selected private residences where the notable guests of the Republic of Genoa were hosted during State visits, as the last of such list was completed in 1664, ten years before the construction of the palace. As a distinguished 17th-century palace in Strada Nuova, however, on 13 luglio del 2006 it was included in the list of 42 palaces which now form the UNESCO World Heritage Site Genoa: Le Strade Nuove and the system of the Palazzi dei Rolli. In 1874, the last descendant of the family, the Duchess of Galliera Maria Brignole Sale, bequeathed to the Municipality of Genoa the palace and the art collections therein, which constitute the first nucleus of today's art gallery.

After 3 years of renovation, the Palazzo reopened in June 2022.

== The Art Collections ==
The art collection includes:

Guercino:

- The Dying Cleopatra
- The Suicide of Cato
- Madonna and Child with the Infant John the Baptist, Saint John the Evangelist and Saint Bartholomew

Veronese:

- Judith and Holofernes

Gregorio De Ferrari:

- Frescoes of Spring and Summer

Antoon van Dyck:

- Portrait of Paolina Adorno-Brignole-Sale
- Equestrian Portrait of Anton Giulio Brignole-Sale
- Christ Bearing His Cross
- Portrait of Filippo Spinola di Tassarolo
- Portrait of the goldsmith Pucci with his son
- Christ Driving out the Money-Lenders
- Portrait of Geronima Sale Brignole with her daughter Aurelia

Albrecht Dürer:

- Portrait of a Young Venetian, 1506

Palma il Vecchio:

- Madonna and Child with Saint John the Baptist and Saint Mary Magdalene, circa 1520-1522

Guido Reni:

- Saint Sebastian

Bernardo Strozzi:

- The Cook
- Madonna and Child with the Infant John the Baptist
- Boy Blowing on a Taper

Ludovico Carracci:

- Annunciation

Giovanni Battista Chiappe:

- Portrait of Doge Rodolfo Maria Brignole Sale

Grechetto:

- The Journey of Abraham's Family
- Nativity
- The Sheep Escaping

== See also ==
- Palazzo Bianco
- Genoa: Le Strade Nuove and the system of the Palazzi dei Rolli
- Genoa
- Via Garibaldi (Genoa)

== Bibliography ==
- Gioconda Pomella (2007), Guida Completa ai Palazzi dei Rolli Genova, Genova, De Ferrari Editore(ISBN 9788871728155)
- Mauro Quercioli (2008), I Palazzi dei Rolli di Genova, Roma, Libreria dello Stato (ISBN 9788824011433)
- Fiorella Caraceni Poleggi (2001), Palazzi Antichi e Moderni di Genova raccolti e disegnati da Pietro Paolo Rubens (1652), Genova, Tormena Editore (ISBN 9788884801302)
- Mario Labò (2003), I palazzi di Genova di P.P. Rubens, Genova, Nuova Editrice Genovese

== Gallery ==
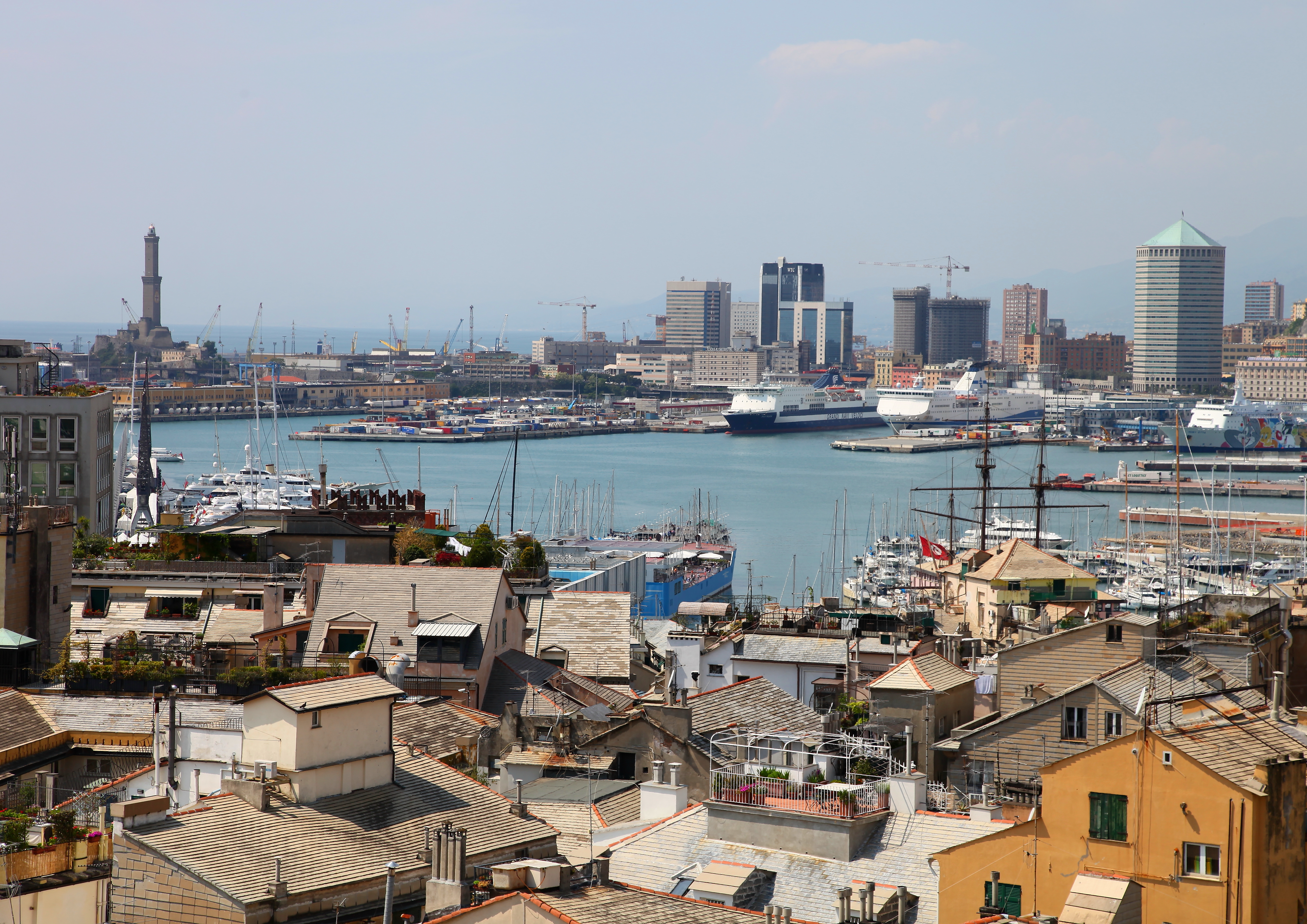
View from Palazzo Rosso, Genoa

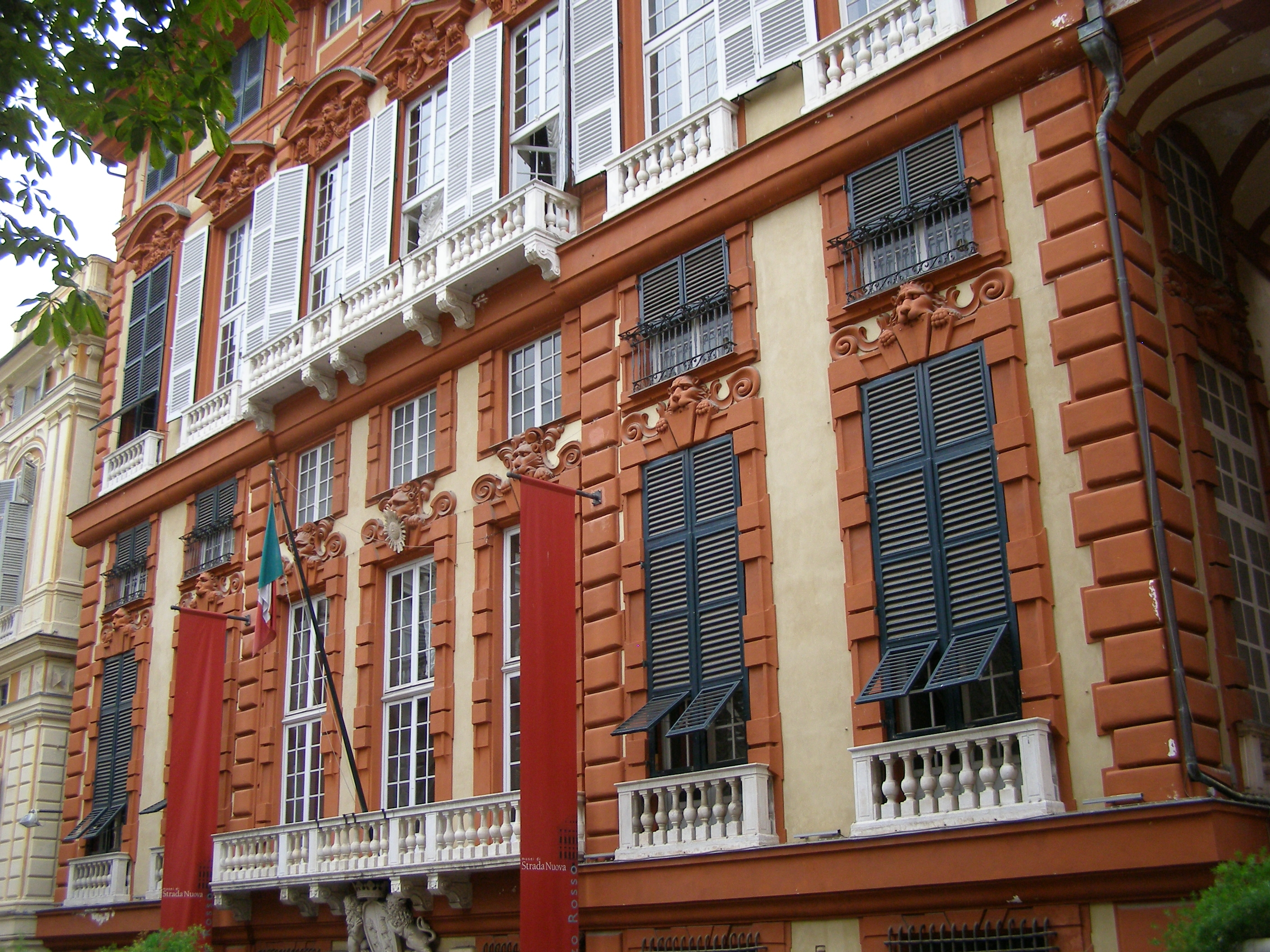
Palazzo Rosso, Genoa

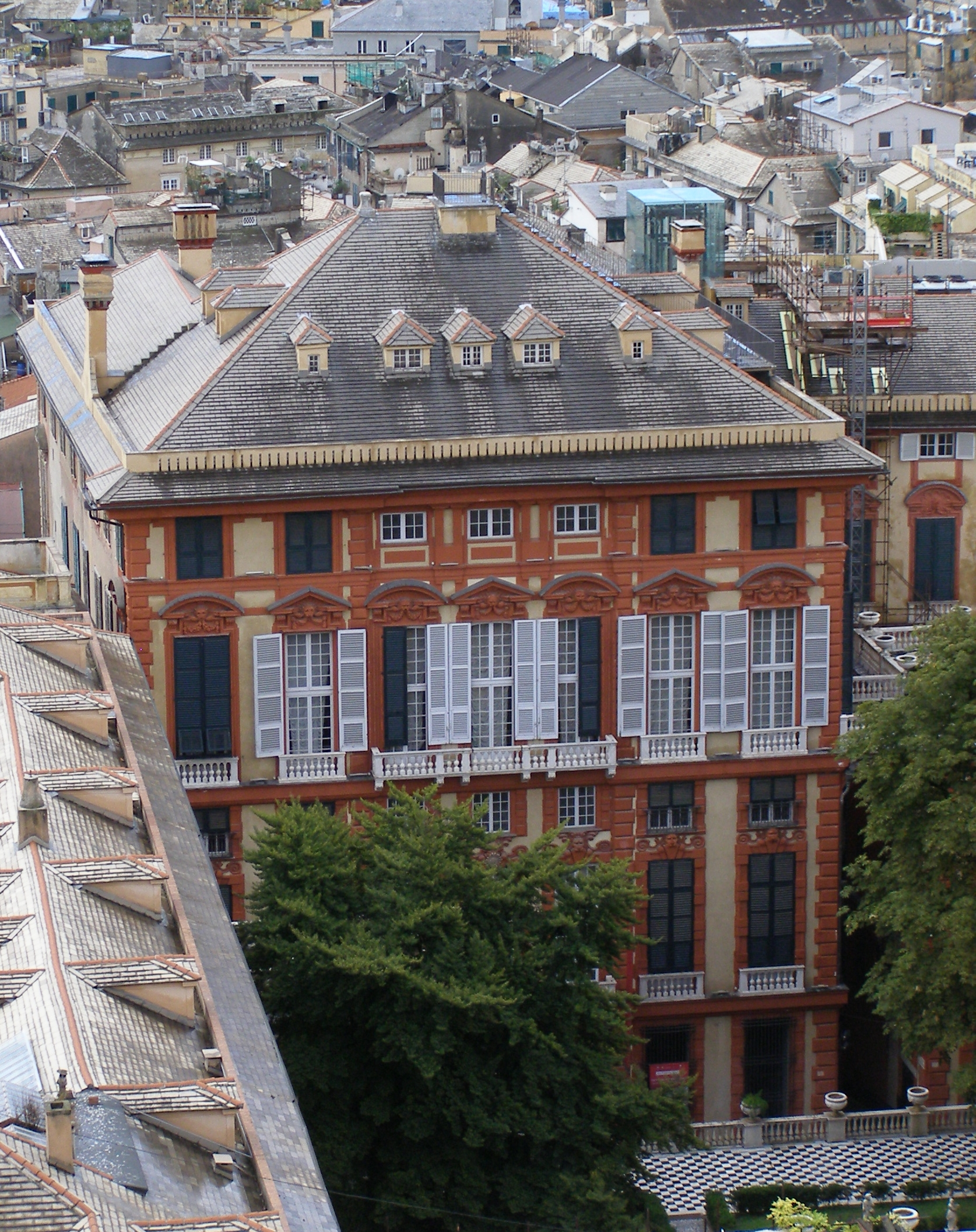
Palazzo Rosso, Genoa

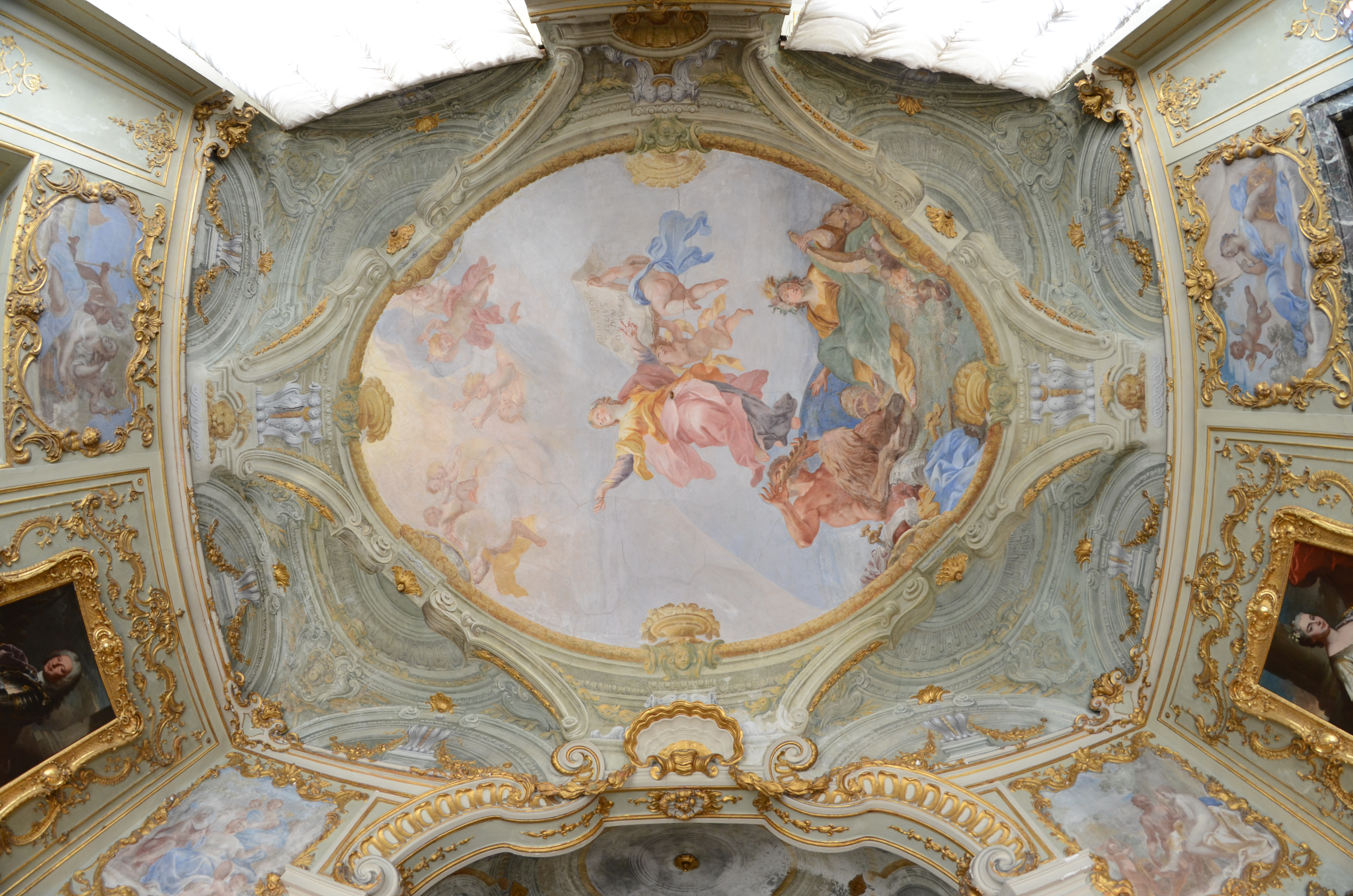
Palazzo Rosso, Genoa

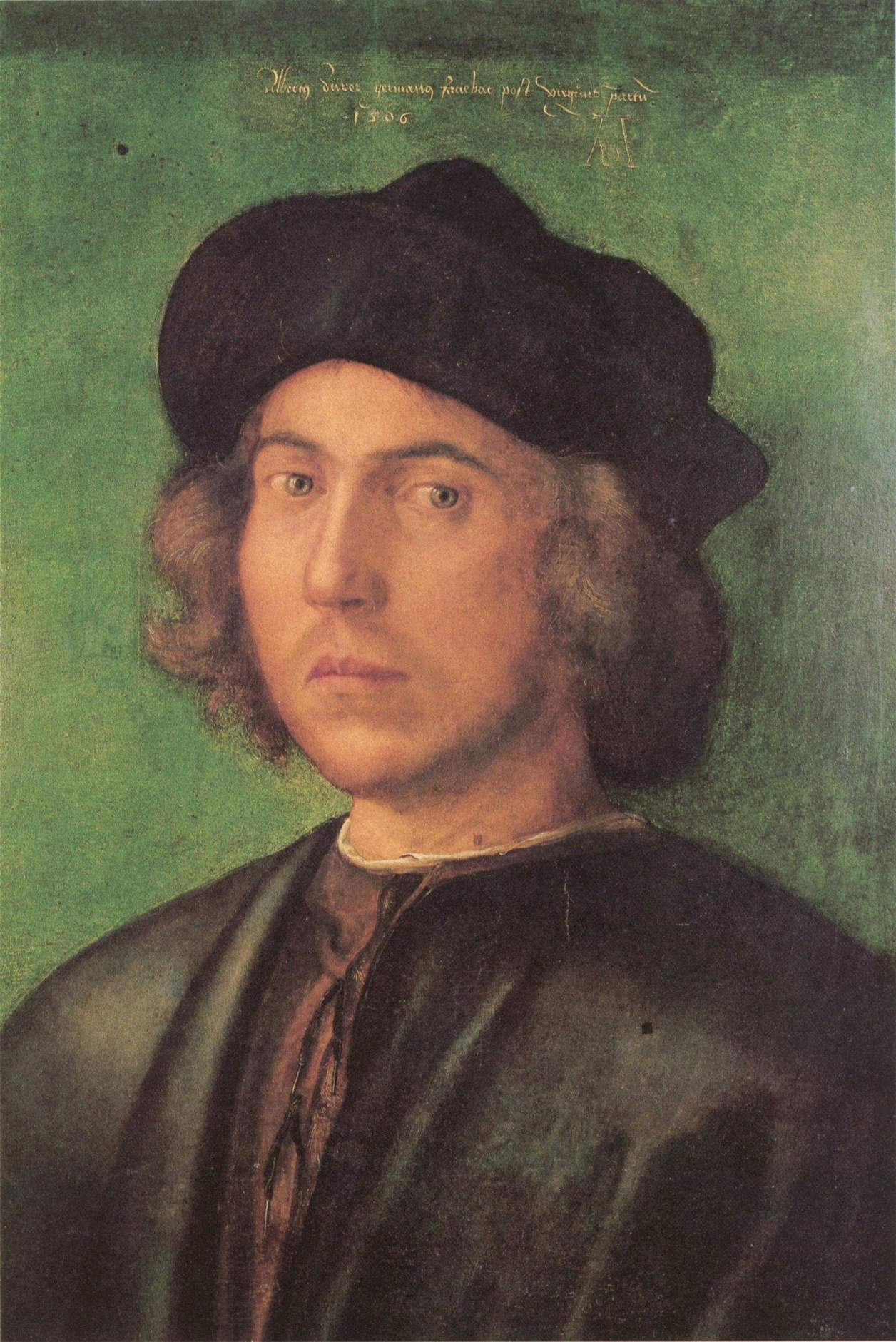
Albrecht Dürer, Portrait of a Young Man, Palazzo Rosso, Genoa

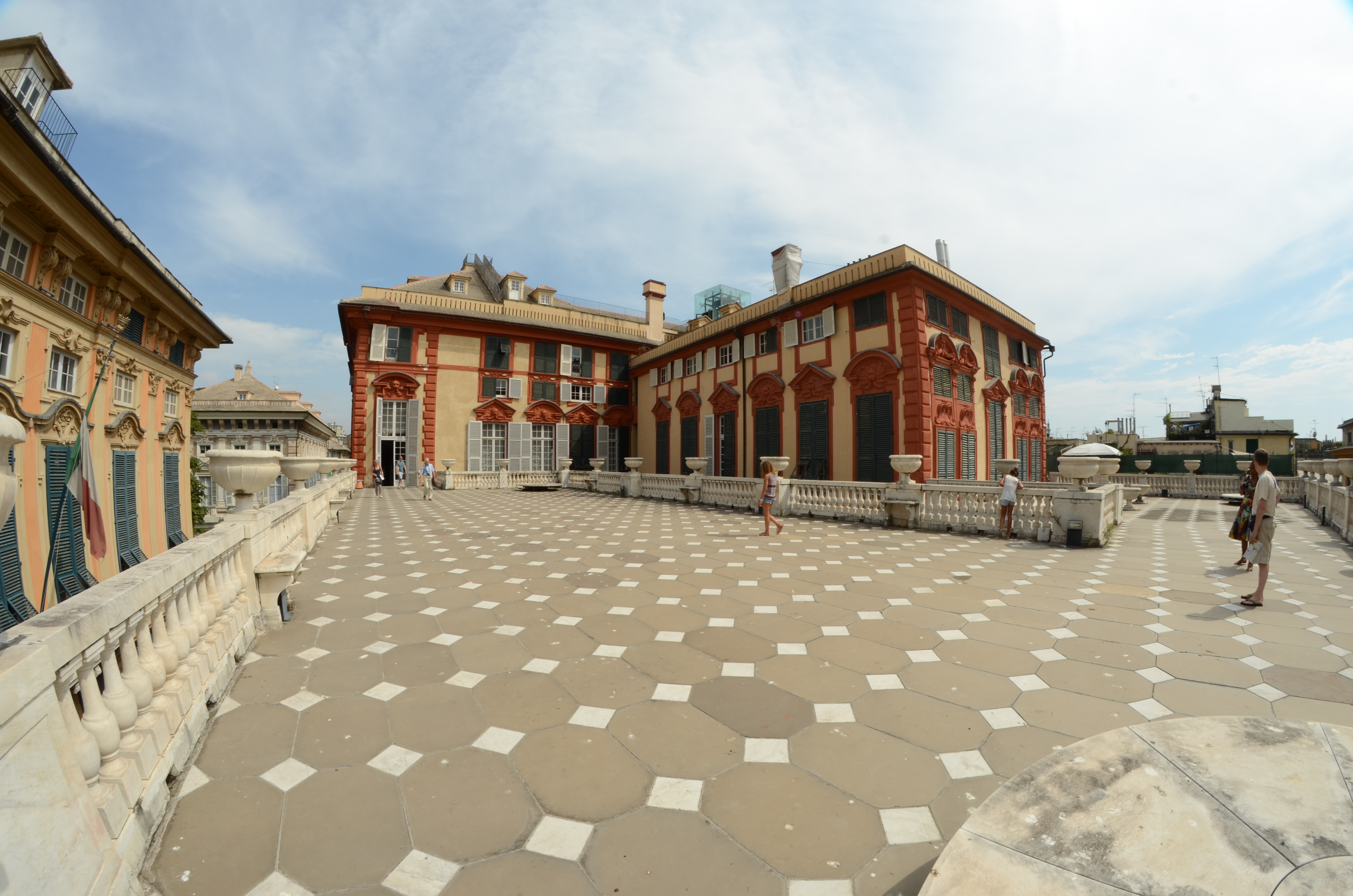
Palazzo Rosso, Genoa

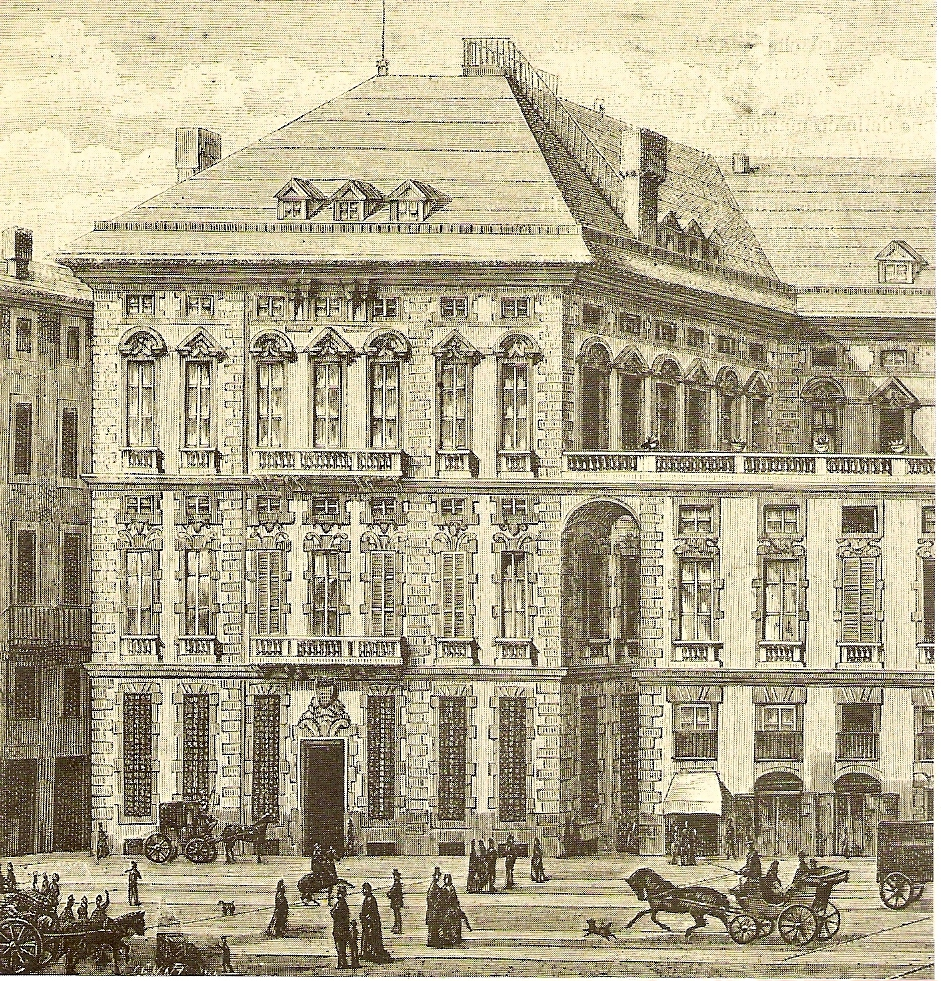
Palazzo Rosso, Genoa

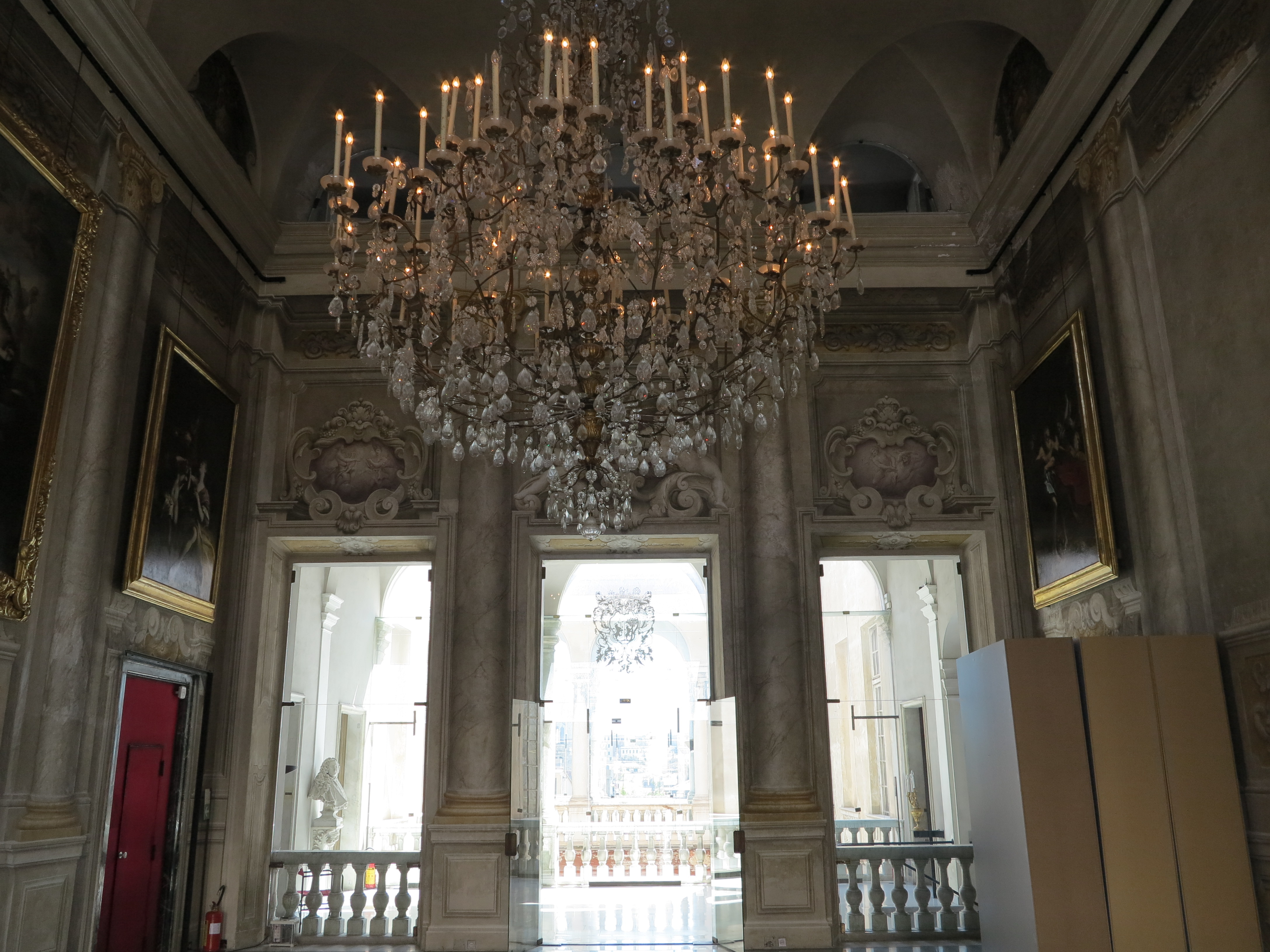
Palazzo Rosso, Genoa

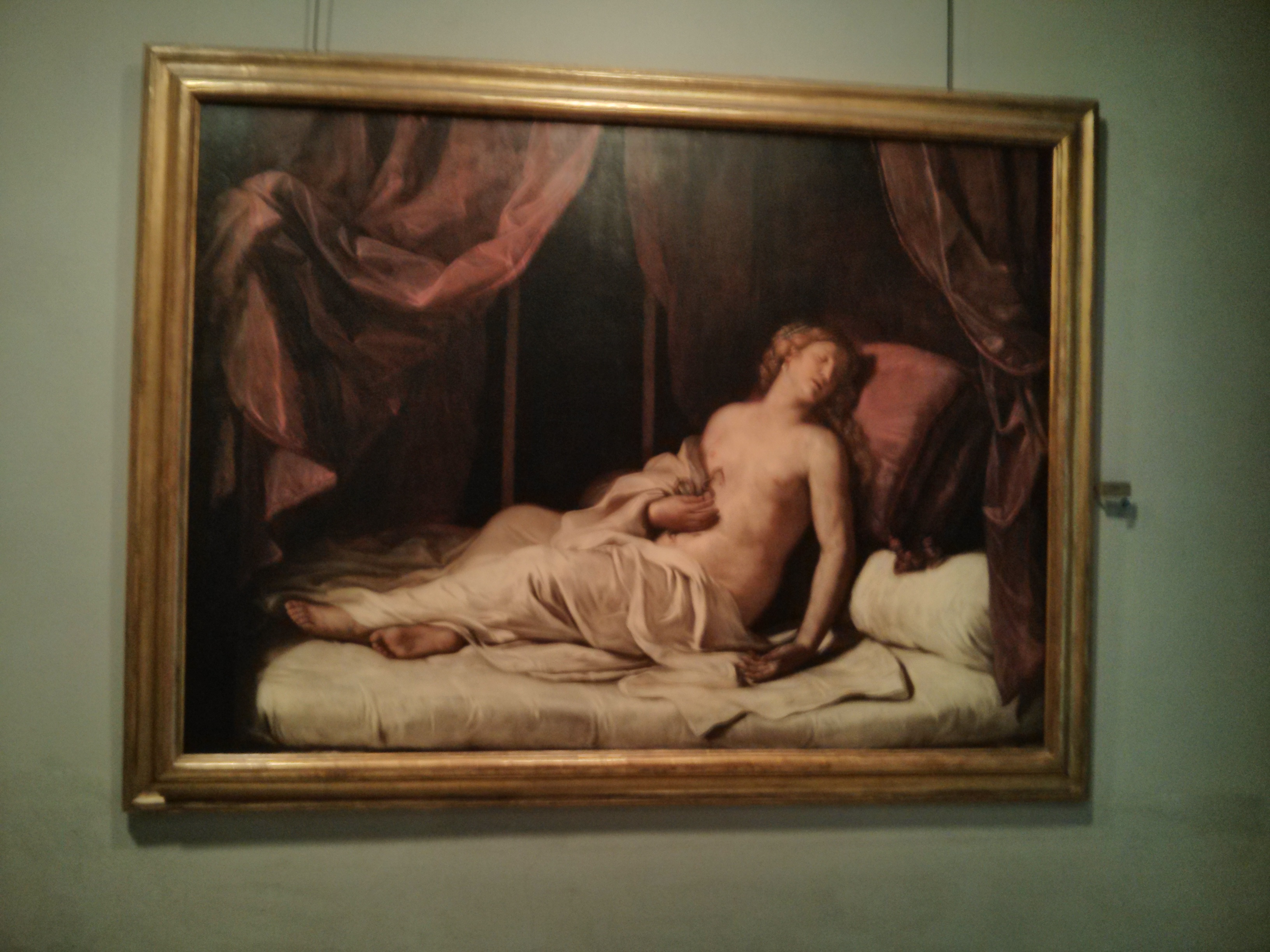
Palazzo Rosso, Genoa

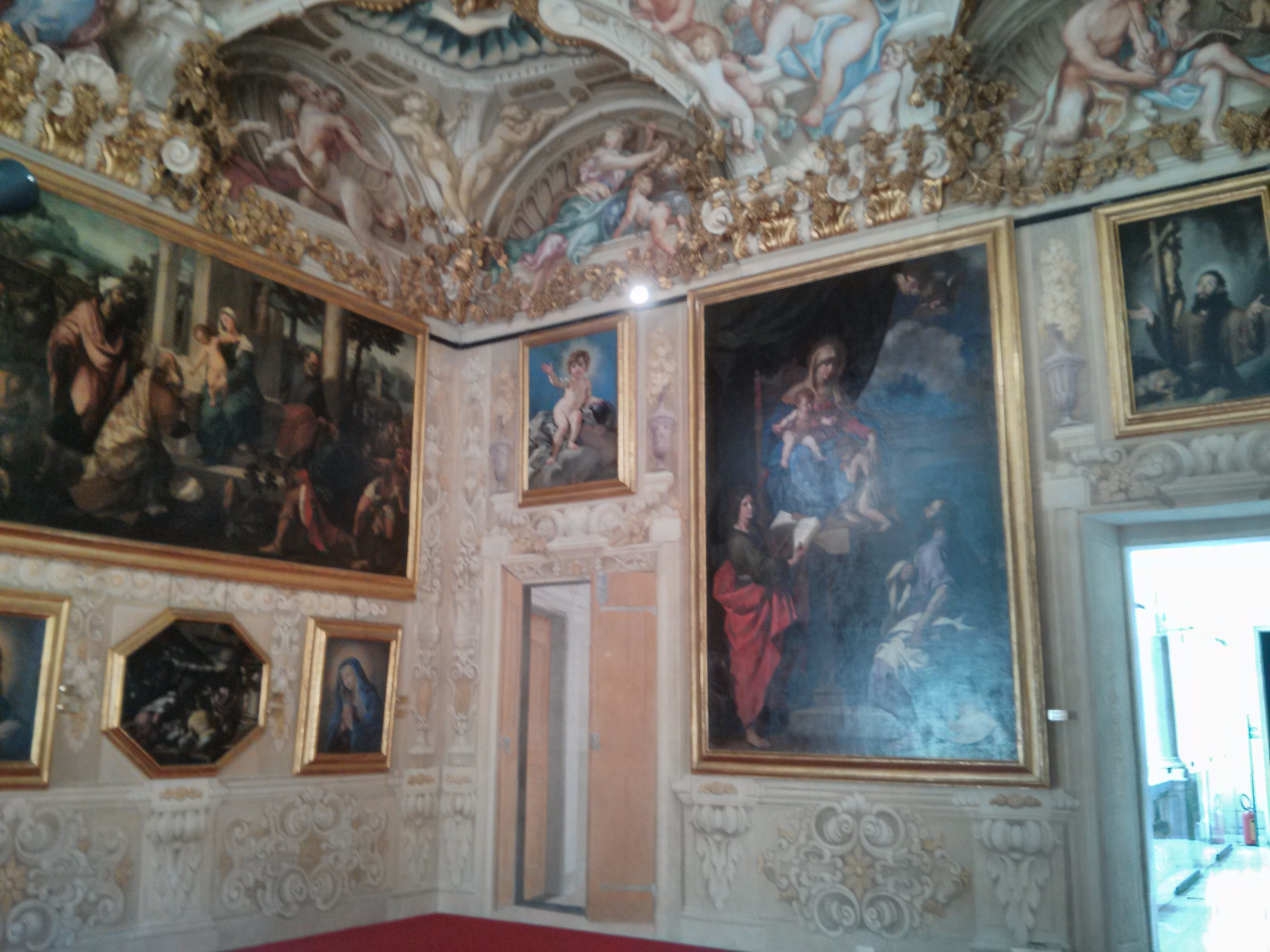
Palazzo Rosso, Genoa

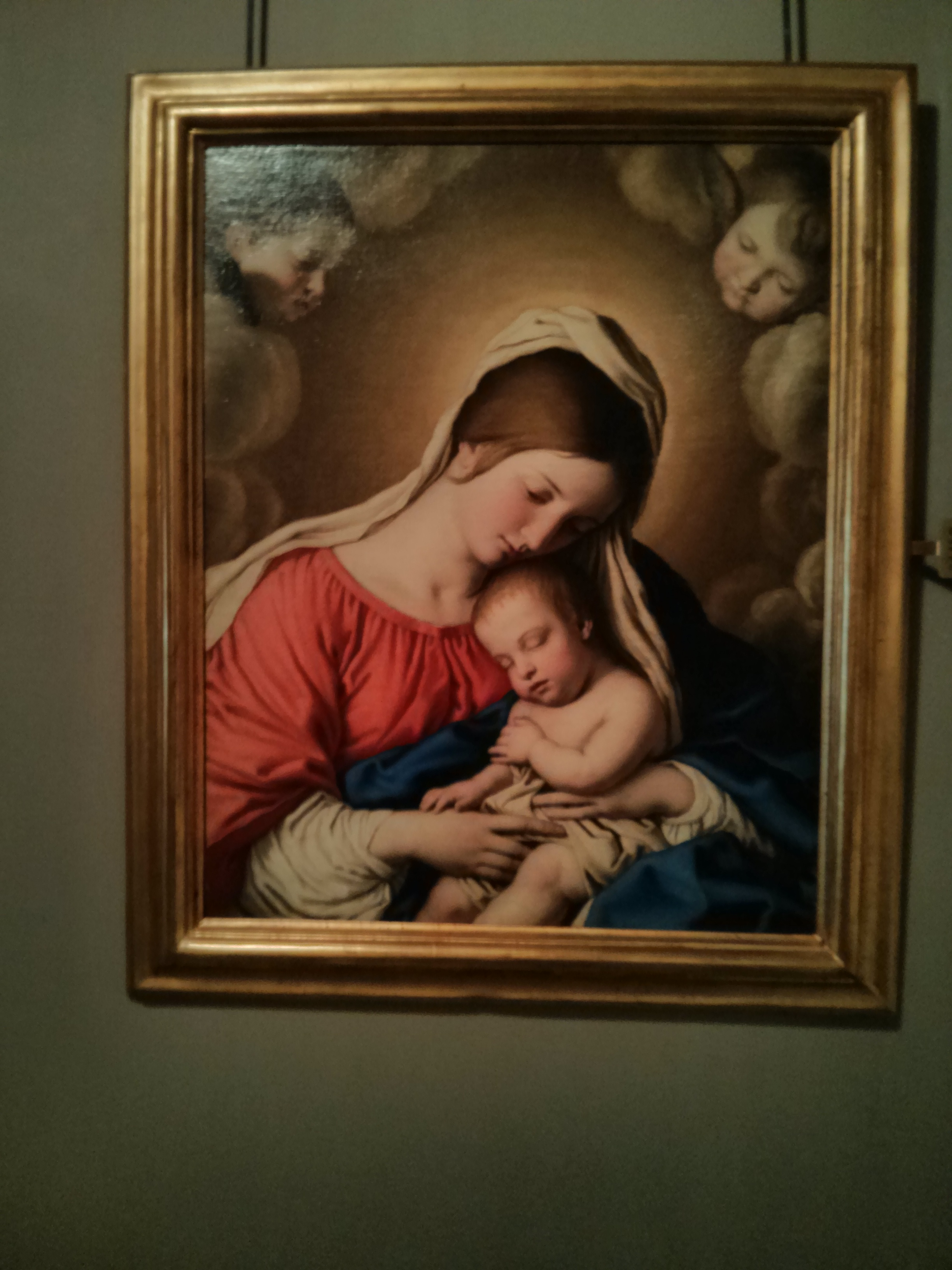
Palazzo Rosso, Genoa

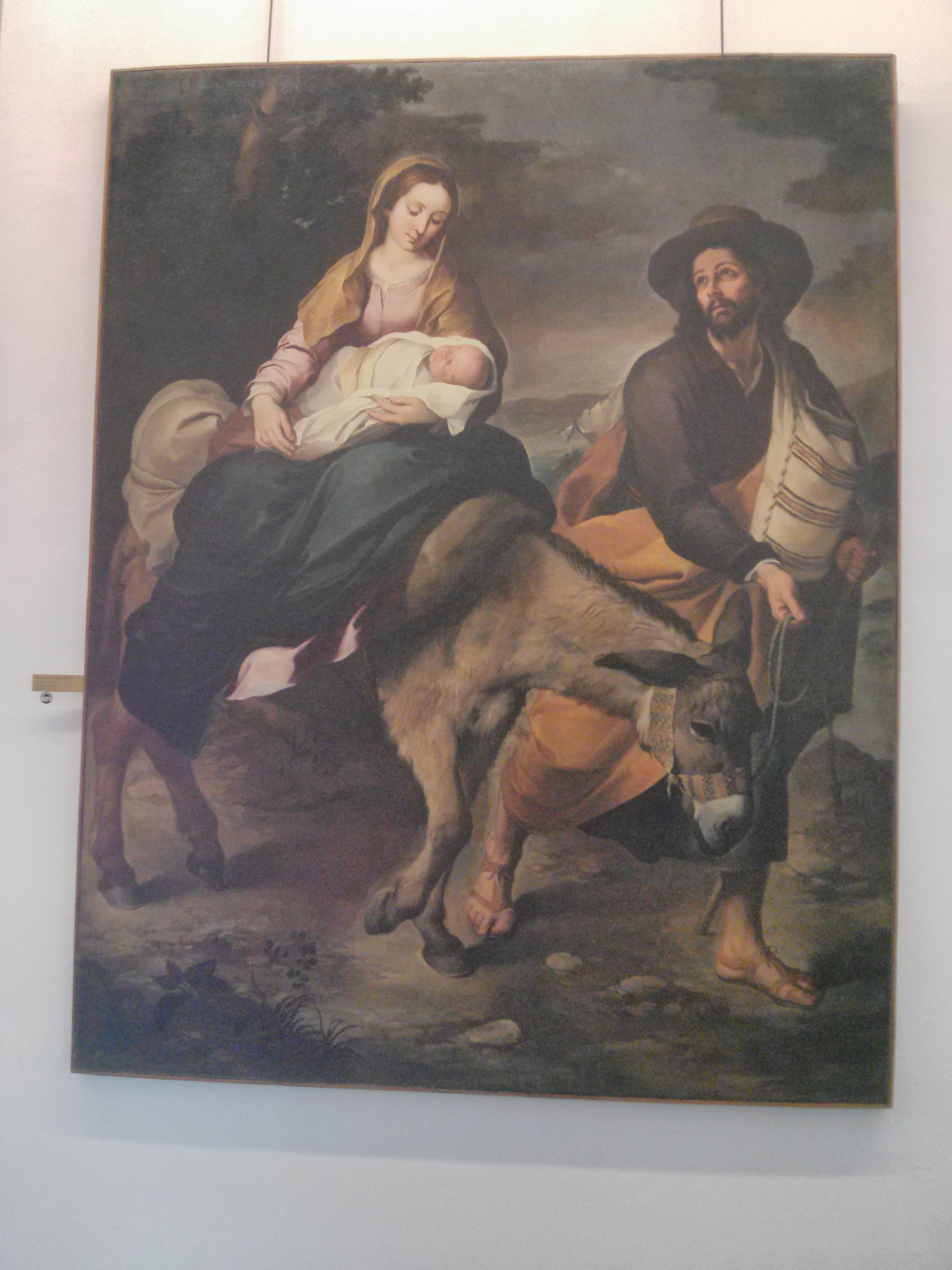
Palazzo Rosso, Genoa

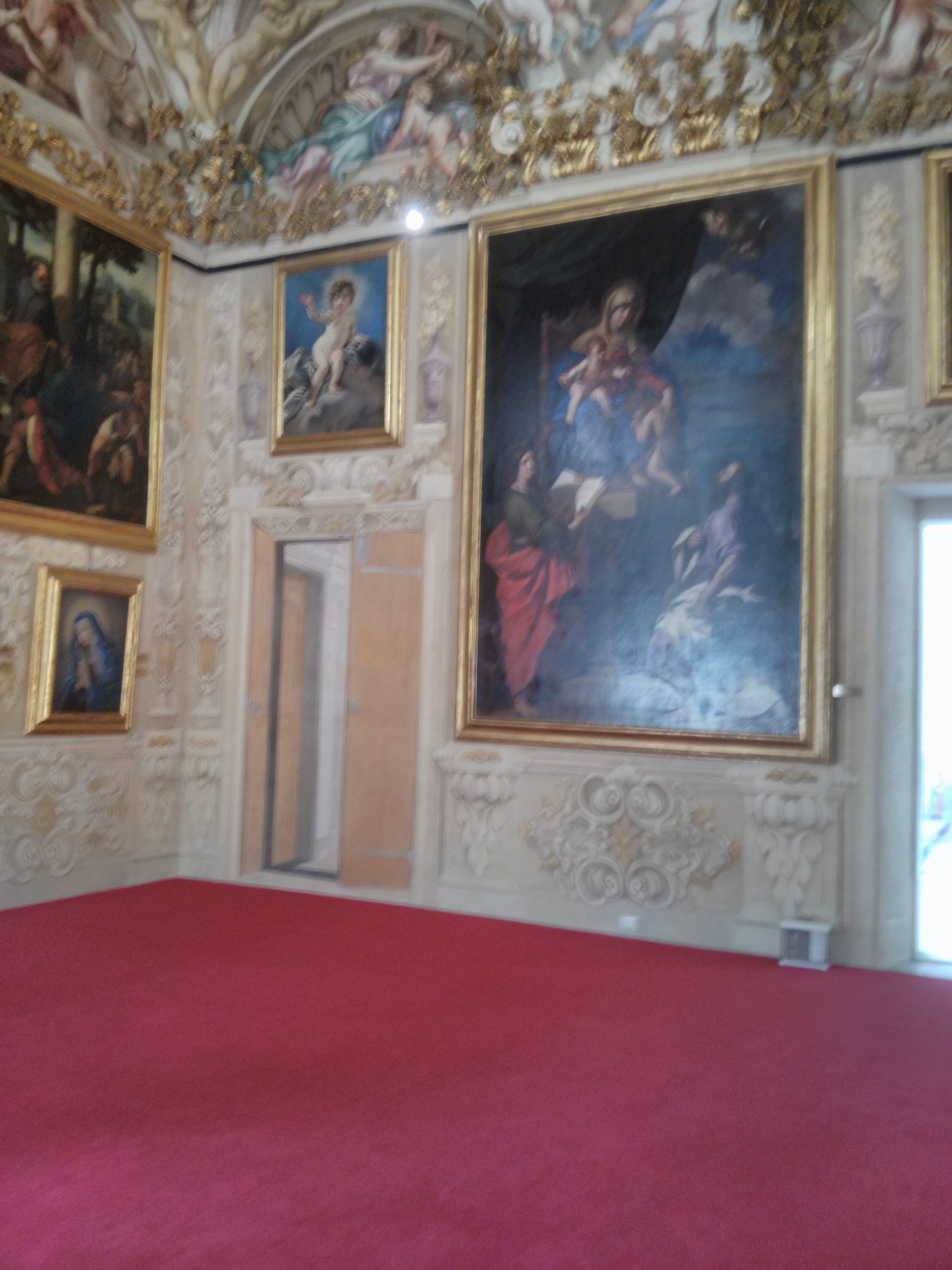
Palazzo Rosso, Genoa
