= Valle di Muggio =

Valley in Ticino, Switzerland

Coordinates: 45.8999°N 9.0455°E

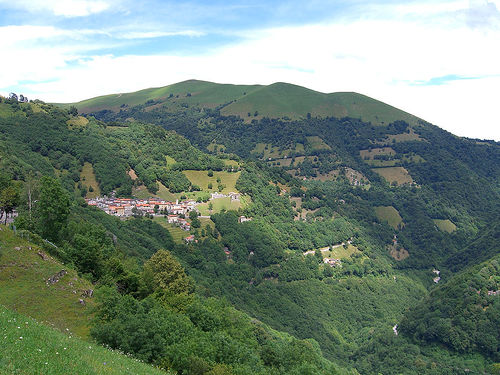

Geography
- Location: Canton of Ticino, Switzerland
- Population centers: Castel San Pietro, Breggia
- River: Breggia
- Interactive map of Valle di Muggio

Valle di Muggio (known as Valle Breggia in Italy) is a valley in the Canton of Ticino, Switzerland, located in the Mendrisio District at the extreme south of Ticino and crossed by the Breggia torrent. Half of its perimeter borders with Italy.

The name comes from the town of Muggio, which is the largest population centre in the valley. Roncapiano is the highest village in the valley, where the roads end. The river Breggia runs through it, before flowing into Italy and Lake Como. The valley comprises the municipality of Castel San Pietro on its right slope and the municipality of Breggia on its left slope.

== Geography and location ==
Val Muggio is situated at the southernmost tip of the Canton of Ticino, forming a natural passage between Como and the Val d'Intelvi. The valley is traversed by the Breggia torrent and is characterized by its mountainous terrain. The region's strategic location has made it an important transit route throughout history, connecting Swiss territory with northern Italian regions.

== History ==
=== Ancient and medieval periods ===
The region was already inhabited during Roman times, taking advantage of its position as a natural passage between Como and Val d'Intelvi. In ancient times, the valley's inhabitants likely formed a single community. During the Middle Ages, several religious establishments held properties in the valley, notably the cathedral chapter of Como. Administratively and spiritually, the valley fell under the jurisdiction of the pieve of Balerna.

== Economy ==
=== Traditional economy ===
Historically, Val Muggio lived from alpine economy, as evidenced by the presence of numerous nevère, typically round buildings that served as ice houses for preserving dairy products. The region also derived resources from other agricultural activities including the cultivation of cereals, potatoes, and in certain areas, mulberry trees and grapevines. The exploitation of forests for timber and chestnuts provided additional income. These revenues were supplemented by seasonal emigration, which quite often became permanent.

=== Modern developments ===
Since the 1950s, traditional activities have lost their importance and by the early 21st century were limited to cheese production, notably zincarlin, a specialty of Val Muggio. The Val Muggio, Val Mara and Salorino Region was founded in 1979 to promote the economic, social and cultural development of this entity.

== Culture and tourism ==
The Ethnographic Museum of Val Muggio was created in 1980 and has been housed since 2003 in the Cantoni house in Cabbio. After a long period of demographic decline accompanied by population aging, a reversal of the trend has been observed since the 1980s, with many municipalities, especially in the lower valley, becoming residential areas. Summer tourism has also developed since the end of the 20th century.

== Demographics ==
After experiencing a prolonged period of demographic decline and population aging, Val Muggio has seen a reversal of this trend since the 1980s. Many communities, particularly those in the lower part of the valley, have transformed into residential areas, attracting new inhabitants and contributing to population growth.

== See also ==
- Cantoni family

== Bibliography ==
- P. Crivelli, S. Ghirlanda, La Valle di Muggio, [film], 1990
- P. Crivelli, La nevèra e la lavorazione del latte nell'alta valle di Muggio, 2nd edition, 1999
- Th. Meyer, Il mulino di Bruzella e gli opifici idraulici della Breggia, 1999
