= Giulia Maderni =

Swiss benefactor (1700–1754)

- Born: Giulia Ursula Antonia Maderni; 1700; Mendrisio, Old Swiss Confederacy
- Died: 17 May 1754; Rome, Papal States
- Other names: Giulia Conti; Giulia Maderni Conti; Giulia Ursula Antonia Conti-Maderni
- Known for: Benefactor of the Capuchin Poor Clare convent of Saint Joseph in Lugano
- Spouse: Francesco Conti
- Relatives: Maria Gertrude Maderni (sister); Giambattista Maderni (brother)

Giulia Maderni (1700 – 17 May 1754) was a representative of the ruling elite of Mendrisio and a major benefactor of the Capuchin Poor Clares convent of Saint Joseph in Lugano.

== Early life and family ==
Giulia Ursula Antonia Maderni was born in 1700 in Mendrisio. She was the second of seven children of Alessandro Maderni (1665–1726), originally from Capolago and later established in Mendrisio, and Ursula Caterina Musatelli (or Mussitelli) of Milan. Her sister Maria Gertrude Maderni was the founding mother and superior of the Ursuline convent of Our Lady of Loreto in Bellinzona, and her brother Giambattista Maderni was active in the Roman curia before becoming archpriest of Mendrisio.

She married Francesco Conti of Lugano, who in 1747, together with his brother Valente Conti, founded the Capuchin Poor Clares convent of Saint Joseph in Lugano. The convent was placed under the patronage of the bishop of Como Agostino Maria Neuroni and the Riva family through Count Abbot Francesco Saverio Riva, delegate for the pious works of the Conti family. The couple had no children.

== Role in the convent foundation ==
According to the two-volume chronicle of the Lugano convent, which covers its entire existence from 1747 to 2000, Giulia Maderni encouraged her husband to found a monastery dedicated to the education of girls. Her father-in-law, Giovanni Pietro Conti, had already designated a bequest for this purpose in 1709. The educational activities of the Capuchins of Lugano began in 1749, addressing daughters of the upper classes through boarding school as well as those of less fortunate classes through a charity school providing basic instruction and catechism. In the 18th century, the Saint Joseph convent was the only one in Lugano to manage an external, daily, free school with a refectory for girls of the town aged 8 to 14. The charity school was immediately successful, with student numbers increasing from 24 to 33 within a few weeks.

Giulia Maderni, a major benefactor of the monastery to which she made considerable donations, played a major role in implementing family strategies. The local ruling elite families sought to consolidate their position and prestige through the foundation of convents and institutions dedicated to female education and through philanthropic activities.

== Later life ==
A pious woman, she went on pilgrimage to Rome during the jubilee of 1750 proclaimed by Pope Benedict XIV and remained there throughout the holy year. With the prior agreement of the bishop, following her husband's death in 1751, Giulia Maderni permanently retired to the Lugano convent, where from the beginning, private spaces separate from the cloister had been arranged for her.

As guardian of her nieces Giulia Francesca Agostina and Caterina Maderni, daughters of her brother Santo (or Santino) Maderni, a colonel, and Ludovica Quadrio (niece of Bishop Neuroni), she had them educated at the Saint Joseph convent. Giulia Francesca Agostina Maderni took the veil there in 1752 (religious name Maria Crocefissa) and pronounced her vows in 1753, later becoming vicar and then abbess. These family ties, as well as those linking students, godmothers of candidates for monastic life, and nuns, attest to the existence of a patronage system that formed the basis of female sociability in the city.

Giulia Maderni, who lived her final years with the nuns, never took the veil herself. She died in Rome on 17 May 1754, where she had traveled once again on pilgrimage in October 1753.

== Bibliography ==
- Maffongelli, Manuela; Nicoli, Miriam (eds.): Ricamare l'alfabeto. Le Cappuccine di Lugano e l'educazione femminile (XVIII-XIX secolo), 2017.
- Nicoli, Miriam; Cleis, Franca: Un'illusione di femminile semplicità. Gli Annali delle Orsoline di Bellinzona (1730-1848), 2021.
