= Maria Gertrude Maderni =

Swiss Ursuline nun (1703–1771)

Personal life
- Born: Maria Colomba Maderni; 1703 Mendrisio, Old Swiss Confederacy
- Died: 22 July 1771 Bellinzona, Old Swiss Confederacy
- Known for: Founder and superior of the Ursuline convent of Our Lady of Loreto in Bellinzona
- Other names: Geltrude Maderni
- Occupation: Ursuline nun, mother superior

Religious life
- Religion: Catholic

Maria Gertrude Maderni (born Maria Colomba Maderni; 1703 – 22 July 1771) was a Swiss Catholic Ursuline nun who founded and led the convent of Our Lady of Loreto in Bellinzona. She was a representative of the ruling elite and served as mother superior or vicar from 1730 until her death.

== Early life and family ==
Maria Colomba Maderni was born in 1703 in Mendrisio to Alessandro Maderni (1665–1726), originally from Capolago, and Ursula Caterina Musatelli (or Mussitelli) from Milan. She was the third of seven children.

Her siblings included Giulia Maderni, who became a benefactor of the Capuchin Poor Clares convent of Saint Joseph in Lugano, and Giambattista Maderni, who was active in the Roman Curia before becoming archpriest of Mendrisio. The Maderni family were bourgeois of Capolago with branches in Mendrisio and Lugano from the 17th century onwards. They were large landowners and included notable artists among their members, including the architect Carlo Maderno.

== Religious life ==
Like her sisters, Maria Colomba Maderni received an education appropriate to her social rank. She entered the Ursuline convent of Mendrisio and took the veil in 1724, adopting the religious name Maria Gertrude. Despite her relative youth, she was elected superior as early as 1729.

=== Foundation of the Bellinzona convent ===
In 1730, Maderni was commissioned, along with another sister, Bianca Teresa Ghiringhelli, to establish an Ursuline community in Bellinzona. The initiative to bring the Company of Saint Ursula to provide education for girls in the town came from the Molo-Sermayno family, particularly Lieutenant Fulgenzio Maria Molo-Sermayno. Without a male heir and with eight daughters to place (two more were born in 1736), he devoted a large part of his fortune to the construction, between 1738 and 1743, of an imposing building adapted to the requirements of enclosure. The building was later transformed between 1848 and 1851 to become the seat of the cantonal government. Daughters from the most influential families of Bellinzona (Bacilieri, Bonzanigo, Chicherio, Magoria, de Molo, Paganini, Sacchi, Vonmentlen) soon entered the convent.

=== Administration and development ===
Under Maria Gertrude Maderni's direction as mother superior or vicar from 1730 until her death (with an interruption between 1747 and 1750), the institution quickly achieved prosperity. As a cultured woman and skilled administrator, she initiated a bakery business (particularly producing biscuits), a boarding school, an external school for girls in the town, and the school of Christian Doctrine.

She also had to deal with a long and complex lawsuit brought against the convent by Sister Fulgenza Marianna Molo, daughter of the institution's founder, supported by her ally Francesca Lucia Paganini. This divisive conflict concerned various aspects touching on significant financial questions (the dowries of Fulgenza Marianna Molo and Francesca Lucia Paganini and the corresponding annuities, the founder's bequests), the conduct of the religious sisters (which Maria Gertrude Maderni conceived in a more restrictive manner), and, more generally, the control of power within the convent. Following this dispute, which involved both ecclesiastical and civil courts, the convent's rule was reformed in 1761 at Maria Gertrude Maderni's request to better define the rights and duties of the religious sisters and align the institution with the conventional model, thus ensuring its consolidation. Maria Gertrude Maderni also introduced the devotion to the Sacred Heart of Jesus in Bellinzona and at the Augustinian convent of Monte Carasso.

=== Legacy ===
Numerous documents written in her hand have been preserved, including a voluminous account ledger of the Bellinzona convent, which she administered with relative autonomy. Like other women in her family who were well integrated into the religious institutions south of the Alps, Maria Gertrude Maderni developed an extensive network of contacts in the various monasteries of the Ticino lands and was able to carve out spaces for action, particularly thanks to her high social position.

== Bibliography ==
- Caldelari, Adolfo: Il palazzo delle Orsoline. Da monastero a residenza governativa, 1973.
- Bellettati, Daniela: "Orsoline di Bellinzona", in: Helvetia Sacra, VIII/1, 1994, pp. 124–132.
- Nicoli, Miriam; Cleis, Franca: Un'illusione di femminile semplicità. Gli Annali delle Orsoline di Bellinzona (1730-1848), 2021.
