= La Valletta (Switzerland) =

Swiss forced labor institution for administrative internment (1932–1975)

- Casa per intemperanti La Valletta

General information
- Location: Valletta, Coldrerio, Ticino, Switzerland
- Year built: 1932
- Demolished: Main building demolished 1997
- Owner: Canton of Ticino

La Valletta was a forced labor institution for administrative internment that operated from 1932 to 1975 in the locality of Valletta, in the municipality of Coldrerio, Canton of Ticino, Switzerland. Known as the "house for intemperants" (casa per intemperanti), it was the main Ticinese institution for the confinement of men aged 18 and older subjected to administrative internment. The facility was integrated into the complex of the cantonal psychiatric hospital, later known as the cantonal neuropsychiatric hospital (Ospedale neuropsichiatrico cantonale, ONC) from 1943, in Mendrisio.

== History ==
=== Construction and establishment ===
The construction of La Valletta was initiated following the 1929 Ticinese law on the internment of alcoholics and vagrants. The project was motivated by the absence in Ticino of structures capable of handling forced labor, unlike other cantons of Switzerland that already had forced labor establishments or penitentiary agricultural colonies. The creation of a penitentiary colony had been discussed in the Grand Council of Ticino in 1921–1922, but the project failed following a popular referendum. The subject was revisited in the 1940s and 1950s, with plans for a colony that would have combined a work education house, an institute for minors, and a penitentiary, but these efforts also produced no concrete results.

The installation of the new establishment within the cantonal psychiatric asylum was justified as an alternative solution to incorporation into a structure for the execution of sentences. This arrangement was intended to develop cooperation between the two institutions in the areas of general services (laundry, kitchen, medical service) and daily management, with La Valletta providing agricultural and artisanal products such as mattresses, shoes, and furniture.

=== Building and facilities ===
Completed in 1932, the main building comprised three dormitories of 20 beds each, a refectory and a living room, five cells, and spaces for artisanal workshops. These workshops were expanded in 1937 with the addition of a supplementary building (demolished in 1997), which also served the needs of the neighboring agricultural colony. The house was directed by a chief supervisor, subordinate to the direction of the cantonal psychiatric hospital and the supervision of its administrative commission.

The most important sources of financing were, in order: contributions paid by the internees and/or their families (or often by public assistance from 1945), direct cantonal subsidies, and the proceeds from the detainees' work.

== Operations and inmates ==
=== Population and categories ===
La Valletta accommodated men confined primarily for reasons related to alcoholism (often associated with violence and vagrancy) and, to a lesser extent, to sexuality (homosexuality and pedophilia). In the absence of adequate penitentiary structures (La Stampa prison in Lugano was not opened until 1968), it also housed, to a more limited extent, voluntary internees, detainees under articles 42 to 45 of the Swiss Penal Code ("dissolute or idle" offenders, "inveterate drinkers," "drug addicts"), and, from the 1960s onward, following the decrease in administrative internments, patients from the ONC.

Despite the heterogeneity of profiles, confined persons were not separated by categories nor subjected to differentiated regimes. The duration of their stay generally varied from six months to two years, but could also be longer. Between approximately 30 and 50 men were interned at La Valletta from the 1930s until World War II, during which a decrease in numbers was observed. From the post-war period until the 1970s, their number increased, oscillating around 60–70. From the late 1960s, ONC patients were added to the internees, so that the house was often overcrowded.

=== Daily life and work regime ===
Conceived as a closed institution, La Valletta applied a system characterized by renunciation of alcohol, community life, and mandatory work. Internees were primarily employed in agriculture, but also in crafts (shoemaking, carpentry, cardboard and bookbinding, and mattress manufacturing workshops). From the early 1960s, agricultural activity declined and diversified into general services, building maintenance, and, in some cases, work release regimes with private companies.

Guards supervised the work and ensured discipline was maintained, sometimes with violence. Except for workshop supervisors, they had no penitentiary or nursing training until around the 1960s. From the 1950s, the changing perspective on alcoholism—from a vice to be repressed to a disease to be treated—led to increasing medicalization of the establishment with greater presence of ONC staff.

=== Integration with psychiatric hospital ===
The synergies with the psychiatric hospital, which strengthened over time, made La Valletta an exception in the world of Swiss confinement institutions. This evolution culminated in 1975 with the transformation of the house into a semi-open section with clinical character of the ONC, intended for patients presenting difficult social situations and chronic alcoholism. However, attempts at revision from 1956 of the cantonal law on internment, aimed at establishing less repressive medico-social norms, failed; the law remained practically unchanged until 1985.

La Valletta was integrated into the ONC in 1975, and its building subsequently became the headquarters of the patients' association Club 74. The main supplementary building constructed in 1937 was demolished in 1997.

== Bibliography ==
- Borghi, Marco; Gerosa, Emilio (éd.): L'ospedale neuropsichiatrico cantonale di Mendrisio 1898–1978. Passato, presente e prospettive dell'assistenza socio-psichiatrica nel Cantone Ticino, 1978.
- Jacomella, Sergio: Carceri, carcerieri, carcerati, 1992.
- Bignasca, Vanessa: Ricerca preliminare sulle misure coercitive a scopo assistenziale e sul collocamento extrafamiliare nel Cantone Ticino (1900–1981), 2015.
- Des lois d'exception? Légitimation et délégitimation de l'internement administratif, 2019, pp. 153–159 (Publications de la Commission indépendante d'experts Internements administratifs, 3).
- «… je vous fais une lettre». Retrouver dans les archives la parole et le vécu des personnes internées, 2019 (Publications de la Commission indépendante d'experts Internements administratifs, 4).
- Un quotidien sous contrainte. De l'internement à la libération, 2019 (Publications de la Commission indépendante d'experts Internements administratifs, 8).
