= Capolago congress =

1891 anarchist meeting

Saint-Imier Congress
- Date: 4–6 January 1891
- Locations: Capolago, Switzerland
- Participants: c. 80 delegates
- People: Errico Malatesta; Pietro Gori; Saverio Merlino; Ettore Molinari; Francesco Pezzi

The Capolago congress, a meeting to establish an Italian anarchist federation, was held in Capolago, Switzerland, from January 4–6, 1891.

== Events ==
The Capolago congress took place in Capolago, Switzerland, from January 4–6, 1891. The meeting had previously been announced with an invitation for socialists of all kinds under a later date and different location to distract the authorities. Participating anarchists included Errico Malatesta, Pietro Gori, Saverio Merlino, Ettore Molinari, and Francesco Pezzi. It was the first Italian anarchist gathering since the 1876 Florence Congress of the First International's Italian Federation. The Capolago congress inaugurated the Partito Socialista-anarchico-rivoluzionario as the anarchists established a common strategy, which the participants considered a reflection of the 1872 St. Imier Congress platform.

The January Capolago congress put passed a resolution to celebrate, propagandize, and endorse a general strike for May Day.

== Legacy ==
Historian Nunzio Pernicone described the congress as the movement's highest point since the First International's heyday.

== Bibliography ==
- Buttà, Fausto (2015). "The Capolago Congress and Pietro Gori in Milan (1891–1894)". Living Like Nomads: The Milanese Anarchist Movement Before Fascism. Cambridge Scholars Publishing. p. 24–. ISBN 978-1-4438-8159-3.
- Pernicone, Nunzio (1993). Italian Anarchism, 1864–1892. Princeton University Press. ISBN 978-0-691-05692-0. OCLC 27267053.
- Turcato, Davide (2012). Making Sense of Anarchism: Errico Malatesta's Experiments with Revolution, 1889–1900. Palgrave Macmillan. ISBN 978-1-349-33736-1.
