= Maurizio Antonioli =

Italian historian (1945–2023)

Maurizio Antonioli (Milan, 29 August 1945 – Milan, 28 September 2023) was an Italian historian who contributed to the workers' and trade union movement research and the history of anarchism.

== Biography ==
Antonioli taught Contemporary History and History of the Trade Union Movement at the State University of Milan. As a speaker, he participated in the conferences organized by the Luigi Einaudi Foundation on Anarchists and anarchy in the contemporary world (in Turin, 5–7 December 1969), on Revolutionary Syndicalism in Italy in the period of the Second International (in Piombino, 28–30 June 1974), and on Revolutionary Syndicalism in the History of the International Workers' Movement (in Ferrara, 2–5 June 1977). In 2011 Antonioli was a speaker on the Pietro Gori study.

He lived in Milan, where he died on 28 September 2023, at the age of 78.

== Works ==
- Fiom from its origins to fascism, 1901-1924 [with B. Bezza] (1978, De Donato).
- Union and progress. Fiom between image and reality (1983, FrancoAngeli).
- Come or May: aspects of May Day in Italy between the nineteenth and twentieth centuries (1988, FrancoAngeli).
- May Day, repertoire of unique numbers from 1890 to 1924, edited by Maurizio Antonioli and Giovanna Ginex (1988, Bibliographic Publishing)
- Direct action and worker organization. Revolutionary syndicalism and anarchism between the end of the nineteenth century and fascism (1990, P. Lacaita).
- Armando Borghi and the Italian Trade Union Union (1990, P. Lacaita).
- Pietro Gori. The errant knight of anarchy (1995, BFS editions ).
- Italian trade unionism from its origins to fascism (1997, BFS editions).
- The Sun of the future. Anarchism in Italy from its origins to the First World War [with PC Masini] (1999, BFS editions).
- Workers and trade union institutions: the origins of workers' representation (2002, BFS editions).
- Reformists and revolutionaries. The Milan Chamber of Labor from its origins to the great war [with J. Torre Santos] (2006, FrancoAngeli).
- Lost Sentinels. Anarchists, death, war (2009, BFS editions).
- Children of the workshop. Anarchism, trade unionism and the workers' movement between the nineteenth and twentieth centuries (2012, BFS editions).
- An arduous and joyful utopia, symbols and myths of anarchists between the 19th and 20th centuries (2017, BFS editions).
- Against the Church. The pro-Ferrer riots of 1909 in Italy (2009, BFS editions).
- For a history of trade unions in Europe (2012, Bruno Mondadori)
- Our homeland throughout the world. Pietro Gori in the Italian and international workers' movement (2012, BFS editions).
