= Coldrerio =

- Municipality
- Flag Coat of arms
- Location of Coldrerio
- Location within Switzerland Location within Canton of Ticino
- Coordinates: 45°51′N 8°59′E
- Country: Switzerland
- Canton: Ticino
- District: Mendrisio

Government
  - Mayor: Sindaco; Corrado Solcà

Area
  - Total: 2.46 km^{2} (0.95 sq mi)
- Elevation: 351 m (1,152 ft)

Population (December 2004)
  - Total: 2,628
  - Density: 1,070/km^{2} (2,770/sq mi)
- Time zone: UTC+01:00 (CET)
  - Summer (DST): UTC+02:00 (CEST)
- Postal code: 6877
- SFOS number: 5251
- ISO 3166 code: CH-TI
- Surrounded by: Balerna, Castel San Pietro, Genestrerio, Mendrisio, Novazzano
- Website: coldrerio.ch

Coldrerio is a municipality in the district of Mendrisio in the canton of Ticino in Switzerland.

== History ==
Coldrerio is first mentioned in 852 as Caledrano. In 1170 it was mentioned as Calderario, in 1185 as Caldirera and in 1187 as Coldrario.

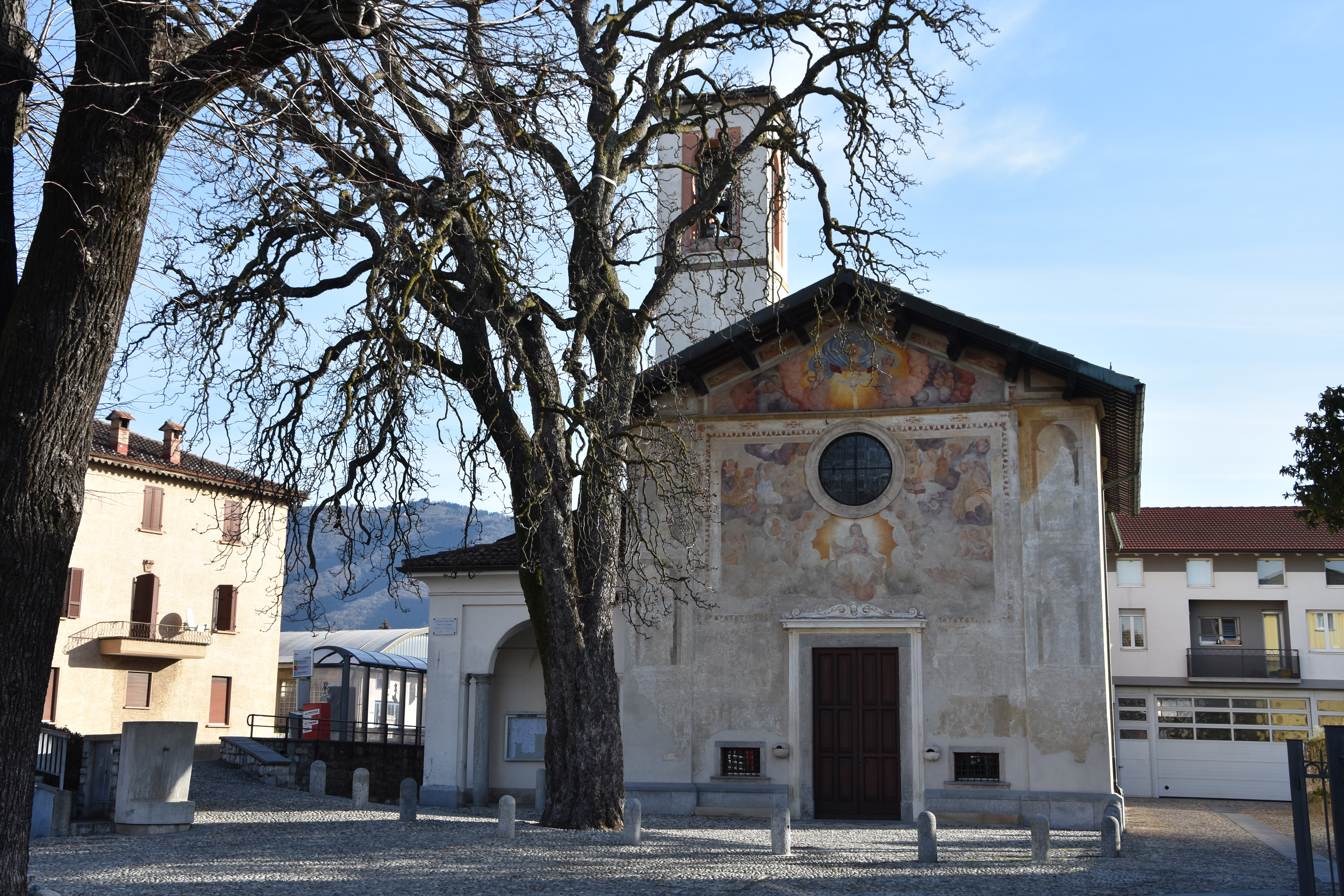
The church of Madonna del Carmelo in Coldrerio

Archeological finds in the area provide evidence of a continuous settlement since the Neolithic period. Excavations of the nearby peat bog (Italian: Torbiera) in 1870 and 1915-21 revealed traces of a settlement with stilt houses. Later findings are from the Roman era and Early Middle Ages. Caledrano was first mentioned as a village during the Early Middle Ages, as were most of the surrounding settlements. It was mentioned several times in the following centuries in connection with gifts given to religious institutions around Como, including S. Abbondio, S. Fedele and S. Lazzaro Hospital. The gift and property documents mention a castle, the village church and several sharecropping farms. It was part of the County of Seprio and by the late 13th century was listed as a municipality.

In 1593, it broke away from the parish of Balerna to form an independent parish. The current parish church of St. George was built in the 16th century and enlarged several times. It stands in the center of the village. In 1287, the first church of St. George was dedicated on a hill overlooking the village. Today, the cemetery church of S. Gregorio, better known as S. Apollonia, stands on the site of the first church.

The fertile soil of the region allowed the village's population to grow. More recently, Coldrerio has grown as a result of the expansion of Chiasso. About 80% of the working population works outside of the Gem, and many are employees of the Swiss Federal Railways.

== Geography ==
Coldrerio has an area, as of 1997, of 2.46 square kilometers (0.95 sq mi). Of this area, 1.68 km^{2} (0.65 sq mi) or 68.3% is used for agricultural purposes, while 0.37 km^{2} (0.14 sq mi) or 15.0% is forested. Of the rest of the land, 0.98 km^{2} (0.38 sq mi) or 39.8% is settled (buildings or roads) and 0.02 km^{2} (4.9 acres) or 0.8% is unproductive land.

Of the built up area, housing and buildings made up 23.2% and transportation infrastructure made up 9.3%. Power and water infrastructure as well as other special developed areas made up 5.7% of the area while parks, green belts and sports fields made up 1.2%. Out of the forested land, 11.4% of the total land area is heavily forested and 3.7% is covered with orchards or small clusters of trees. Of the agricultural land, 30.5% is used for growing crops, while 14.6% is used for orchards or vine crops and 23.2% is used for alpine pastures.

The municipality is located in the Mendrisio district, between Mendrisio and Balerna. It consists of the village of Coldrerio and numerous small settlements, of which Villa is the most important.

== Demographics ==
Coldrerio has a population (as of December 2020) of 2,867. As of 2008, 18.1% of the population are resident foreign nationals. Over the last 10 years (1997–2007) the population has changed at a rate of 2.9%.

Most of the population (as of 2000) speaks Italian (90.3%), with German being second most common (4.5%) and French being third (1.4%). Of the Swiss national languages (as of 2000), 114 speak German, 35 people speak French, 2,293 people speak Italian, and 3 people speak Romansh. The remainder (93 people) speak another language.

As of 2008, the gender distribution of the population was 48.8% male and 51.2% female. The population was made up of 1,023 Swiss men (38.2% of the population), and 284 (10.6%) non-Swiss men. There were 1,165 Swiss women (43.5%), and 209 (7.8%) non-Swiss women.

In 2008 there were 9 live births to Swiss citizens and 5 births to non-Swiss citizens, and in same time span there were 18 deaths of Swiss citizens and 2 non-Swiss citizen deaths. Ignoring immigration and emigration, the population of Swiss citizens decreased by 9 while the foreign population increased by 3. There were 4 Swiss men who immigrated back to Switzerland and 1 Swiss woman who emigrated from Switzerland. At the same time, there were 7 non-Swiss men and 17 non-Swiss women who immigrated from another country to Switzerland. The total Swiss population remained the same in 2008 (from all sources, including moves across municipal borders) while the non-Swiss population change was an increase of 7 people. This represents a population growth rate of 0.3%.

The age distribution, as of 2009, in Coldrerio is; 199 children or 7.4% of the population are between 0 and 9 years old and 292 teenagers or 10.9% are between 10 and 19. Of the adult population, 272 people or 10.1% of the population are between 20 and 29 years old. 337 people or 12.6% are between 30 and 39, 440 people or 16.4% are between 40 and 49, and 419 people or 15.6% are between 50 and 59. The senior population distribution is 352 people or 13.1% of the population are between 60 and 69 years old, 227 people or 8.5% are between 70 and 79, there are 143 people or 5.3% who are over 80.

As of 2000, there were 1,074 private households in the municipality, and an average of 2.4 persons per household. In 2000 there were 307 single family homes (or 56.5% of the total) out of a total of 543 inhabited buildings. There were 217 multi-family buildings (40.0%), along with 9 multi-purpose buildings that were mostly used for housing (1.7%) and 10 other use buildings (commercial or industrial) that also had some housing (1.8%). Of the single family homes 5 were built before 1919, while 41 were built between 1990 and 2000. The greatest number of single family homes (72) were built between 1981 and 1990.

In 2000 there were 1,176 apartments in the municipality. The most common apartment size was 4 rooms of which there were 369. There were 63 single room apartments and 267 apartments with five or more rooms. Of these apartments, a total of 1,069 apartments (90.9% of the total) were permanently occupied, while 66 apartments (5.6%) were seasonally occupied and 41 apartments (3.5%) were empty. The vacancy rate for the municipality, in 2008, was 0.7%. As of 2007, the construction rate of new housing units was 6.9 new units per 1000 residents.

The historical population is given in the following chart:

== Heritage sites of national significance ==
The Torbiera archeological site is listed as a Swiss heritage site of national significance. The entire villages of Coldrerio and Villa are part of the Inventory of Swiss Heritage Sites.

== Politics ==
In the 2007 federal election the most popular party was the FDP which received 37.14% of the vote. The next three most popular parties were the SP (20.45%), the CVP (16.38%) and the Ticino League (14.41%). In the federal election, a total of 999 votes were cast, and the voter turnout was 54.4%.

In the 2007 Gran Consiglio election, there were a total of 1,818 registered voters in Coldrerio, of which 1,367 or 75.2% voted. 25 blank ballots and 1 null ballot were cast, leaving 1,341 valid ballots in the election. The most popular party was the PLRT which received 530 or 39.5% of the vote. The next three most popular parties were; the PS (with 256 or 19.1%), the SSI (with 219 or 16.3%) and the LEGA (with 144 or 10.7%).

In the 2007 Consiglio di Stato election, 17 blank ballots and 6 null ballots were cast, leaving 1,345 valid ballots in the election. The most popular party was the PLRT which received 471 or 35.0% of the vote. The next three most popular parties were; the PS (with 286 or 21.3%), the LEGA (with 226 or 16.8%) and the SSI (with 207 or 15.4%).

== Economy ==
As of 2007, Coldrerio had an unemployment rate of 4.35%. As of 2005, there were 39 people employed in the primary economic sector and about 7 businesses involved in this sector. 121 people were employed in the secondary sector and there were 14 businesses in this sector. 290 people were employed in the tertiary sector, with 59 businesses in this sector.

There were 1,145 residents of the municipality who were employed in some capacity, of which females made up 40.1% of the workforce. In 2008 the total number of full-time equivalent jobs was 1,256. The number of jobs in the primary sector was 22, all of which were in agriculture. The number of jobs in the secondary sector was 167, of which 131 or (78.4%) were in manufacturing and 28 (16.8%) were in construction. The number of jobs in the tertiary sector was 1,067. In the tertiary sector; 912 or 85.5% were in wholesale or retail sales or the repair of motor vehicles, 21 or 2.0% were in the movement and storage of goods, 42 or 3.9% were in a hotel or restaurant, 3 or 0.3% were in the information industry, 8 or 0.7% were the insurance or financial industry, 9 or 0.8% were technical professionals or scientists, 22 or 2.1% were in education and 18 or 1.7% were in health care.

In 2000, there were 467 workers who commuted into the municipality and 982 workers who commuted away. The municipality is a net exporter of workers, with about 2.1 workers leaving the municipality for every one entering. About 33.0% of the workforce coming into Coldrerio are coming from outside Switzerland, while 0.8% of the locals commute out of Switzerland for work. Of the working population, 9.3% used public transportation to get to work, and 71% used a private car.

As of 2009, there was one hotel in Coldrerio.

== Religion ==
From the 2000 census, 2,199 or 86.6% were Roman Catholic, while 98 or 3.9% belonged to the Swiss Reformed Church. There are 169 individuals (or about 6.66% of the population) who belong to another church (not listed on the census), and 72 individuals (or about 2.84% of the population) did not answer the question.

== Weather ==
Coldrerio has an average of 98.9 days of rain or snow per year and on average receives 1,507 mm (59.3 in) of precipitation. The wettest month is May during which time Coldrerio receives an average of 188 mm (7.4 in) of rain or snow. During this month there is precipitation for an average of 12.5 days. The driest month of the year is December with an average of 67 mm (2.6 in) of precipitation over 5.6 days.

== Education ==
The entire Swiss population is generally well educated. In Coldrerio about 69.8% of the population (between age 25 and 64) have completed either non-mandatory upper secondary education or additional higher education (either University or a Fachhochschule).

In Coldrerio there were a total of 384 students (as of 2009). The Ticino education system provides up to three years of non-mandatory kindergarten and in Coldrerio there were 57 children in kindergarten. The primary school program lasts for five years and includes both a standard school and a special school. In the municipality, 87 students attended the standard primary schools and 3 students attended the special school. In the lower secondary school system, students either attend a two-year middle school followed by a two-year pre-apprenticeship or they attend a four-year program to prepare for higher education. There were 100 students in the two-year middle school and 1 in their pre-apprenticeship, while 54 students were in the four-year advanced program.

The upper secondary school includes several options, but at the end of the upper secondary program, a student will be prepared to enter a trade or to continue on to a university or college. In Ticino, vocational students may either attend school while working on their internship or apprenticeship (which takes three or four years) or may attend school followed by an internship or apprenticeship (which takes one year as a full-time student or one and a half to two years as a part-time student). There were 43 vocational students who were attending school full-time and 31 who attend part-time.

The professional program lasts three years and prepares a student for a job in engineering, nursing, computer science, business, tourism and similar fields. There were 8 students in the professional program.

As of 2000, there was 1 student in Coldrerio who came from another municipality, while 247 residents attended schools outside the municipality.

== People ==
- Pier Francesco Mola (1612–1666), painter
