= Tremona =

- Quarter
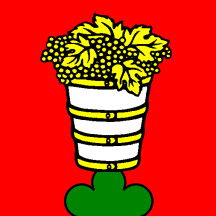
- Flag Coat of arms

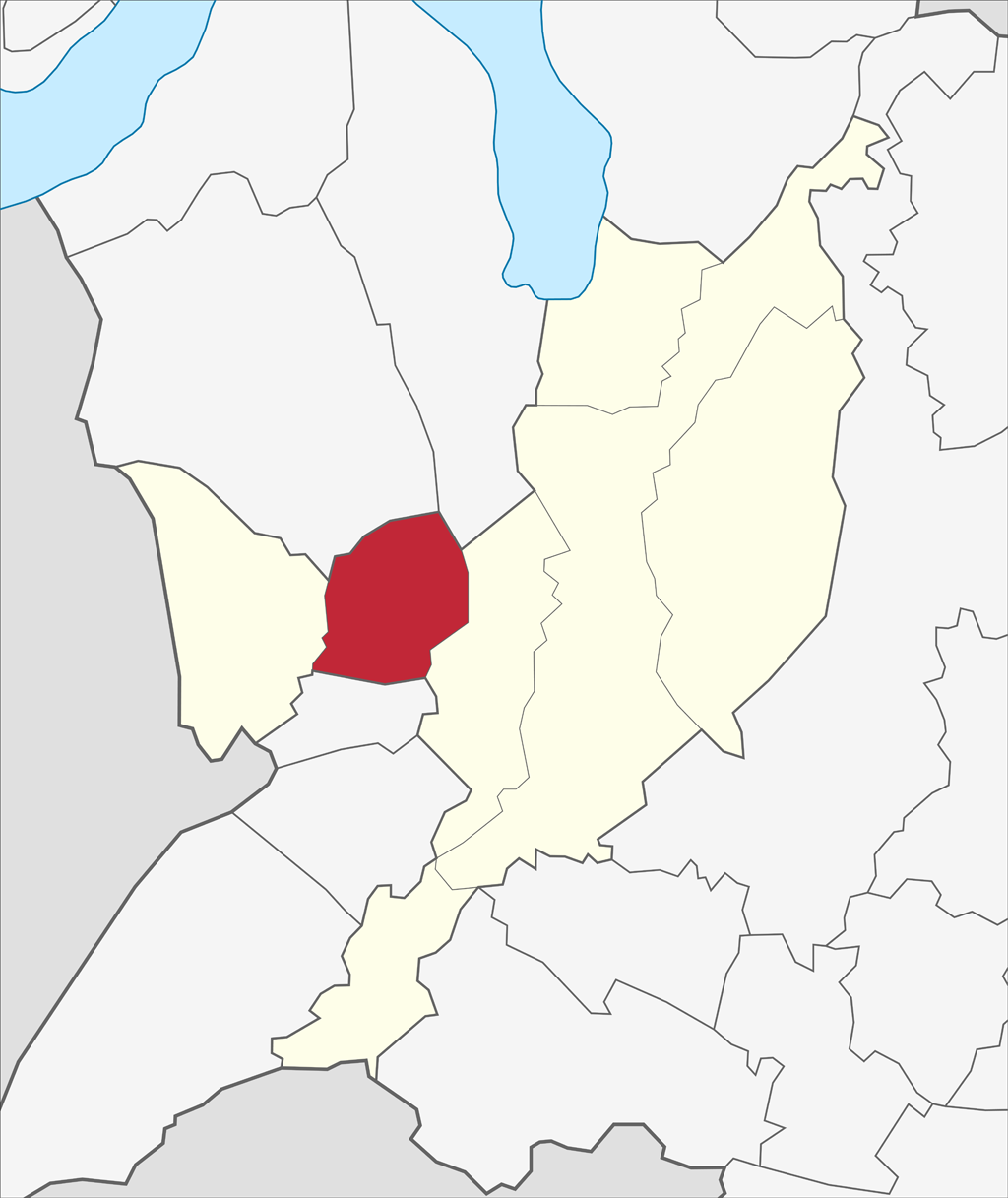
- Country: Switzerland
- Canton: Ticino
- District: Mendrisio
- City: Mendrisio

Area
  - Total: 1.61 km^{2} (0.62 sq mi)

Population (2011-12-31)
  - Total: 506
  - Density: 314/km^{2} (814/sq mi)

Tremona was a municipality in the district of Mendrisio in the canton of Ticino in Switzerland.

On 5 April 2009 the municipalities of Arzo, Capolago, Genestrerio, Mendrisio, Rancate and Tremona merged into the municipality of Mendrisio.
