= Rancate =

- Quarter
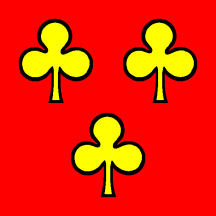
- Flag Coat of arms

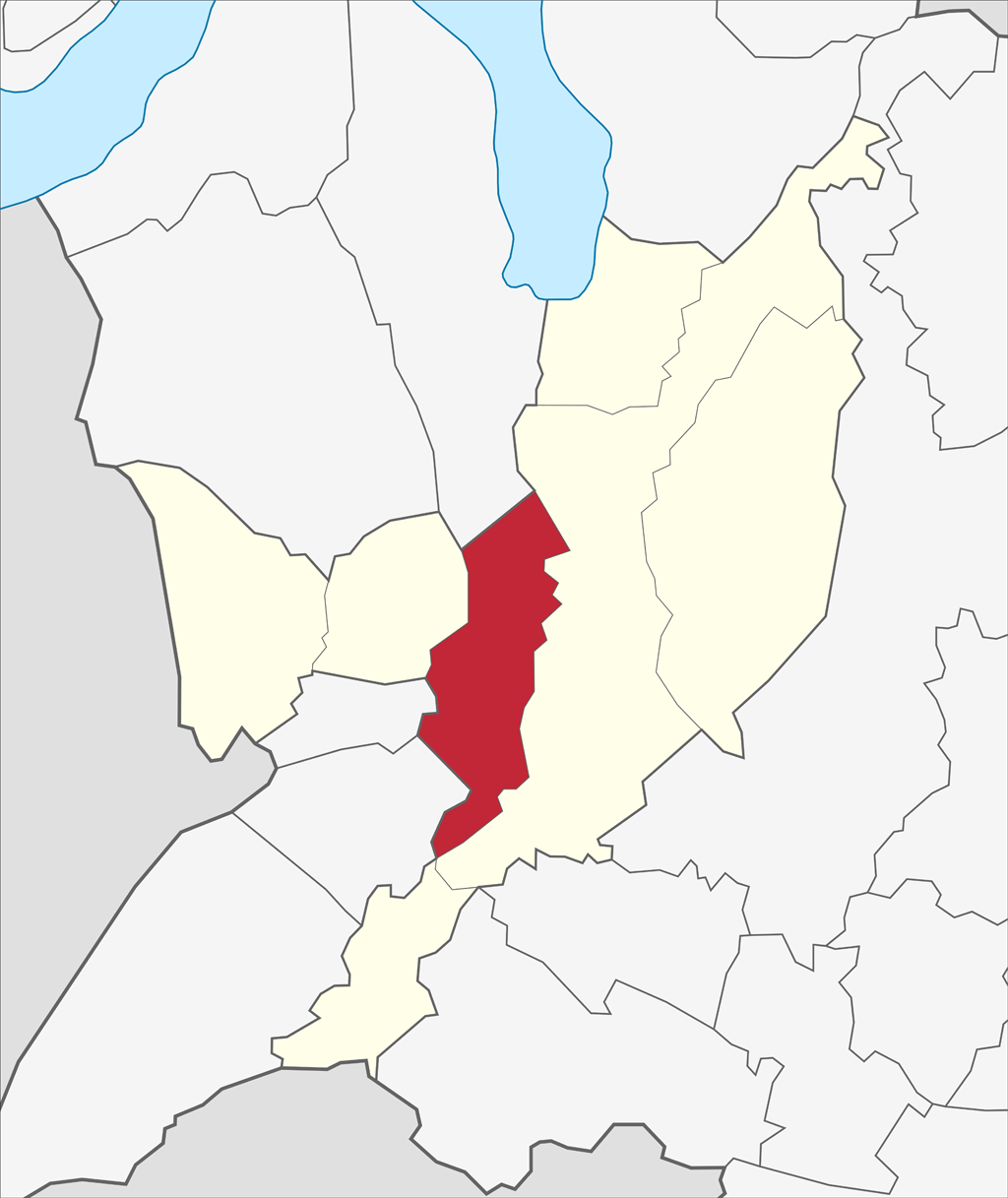
- Country: Switzerland
- Canton: Ticino
- District: Mendrisio
- City: Mendrisio

Area
  - Total: 2.28 km^{2} (0.88 sq mi)

Population (2011-12-31)
  - Total: 1,520
  - Density: 667/km^{2} (1,730/sq mi)

Rancate was a municipality in the district of Mendrisio in the canton of Ticino in Switzerland.

Aerial view (1946)

On 5 April 2009 the municipalities of Arzo, Capolago, Genestrerio, Mendrisio, Rancate and Tremona merged into the municipality of Mendrisio.
