= Arzo =

- Quarter
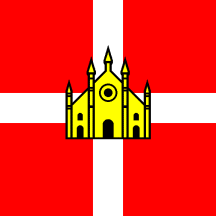
- Flag Coat of arms

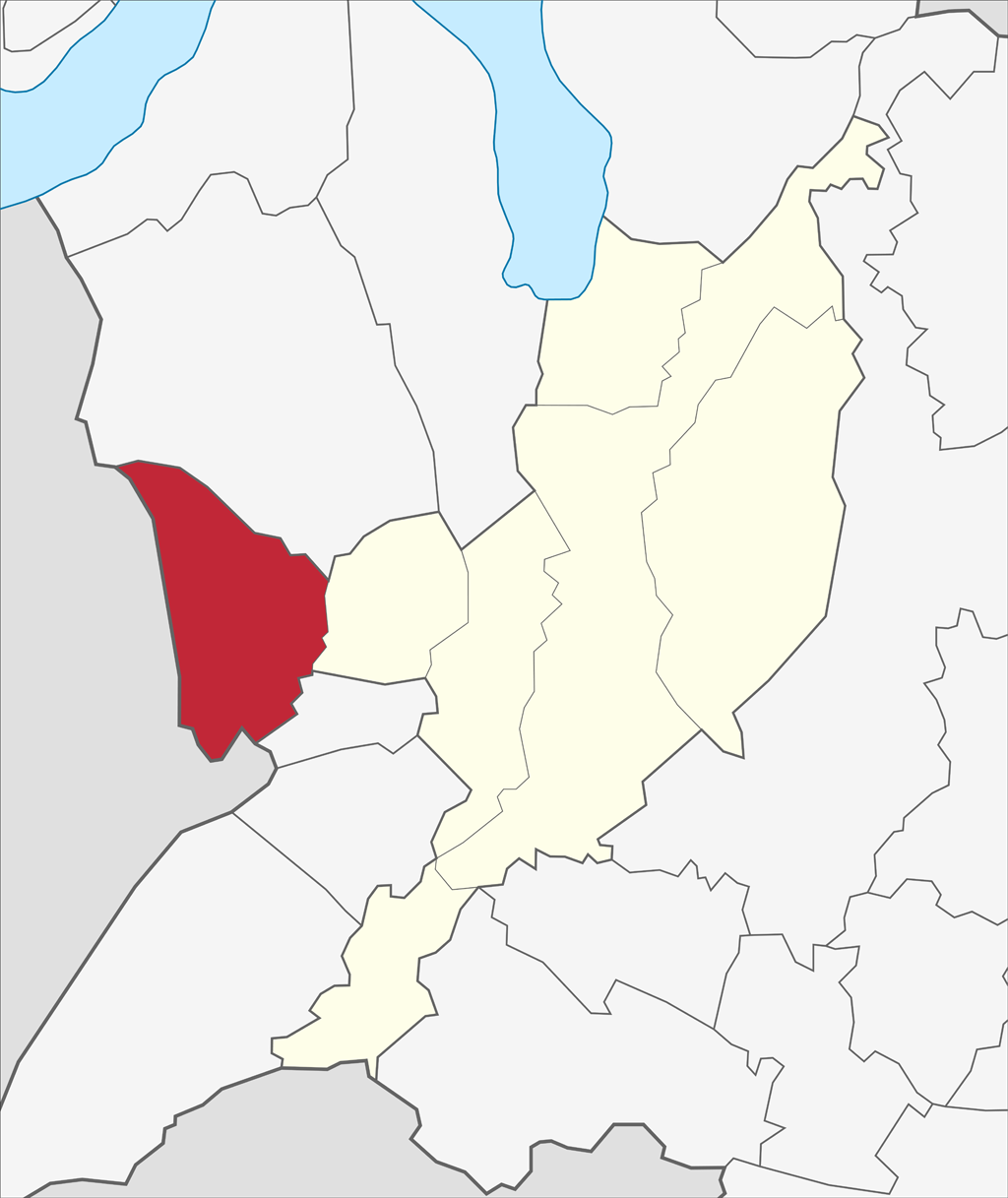
- Country: Switzerland
- Canton: Ticino
- District: Mendrisio
- City: Mendrisio

Area
  - Total: 2.79 km^{2} (1.08 sq mi)

Population (2011-12-31)
  - Total: 1,232
  - Density: 442/km^{2} (1,140/sq mi)

Arzo was a municipality in the district of Mendrisio in the canton of Ticino in Switzerland.

It had an area of 2.82 km^{2} (1.09 sq mi) and a population of 1,126 inhabitants (December 2007).

On 5 April 2009 the municipalities of Arzo, Capolago, Genestrerio, Mendrisio, Rancate and Tremona merged into the municipality of Mendrisio.

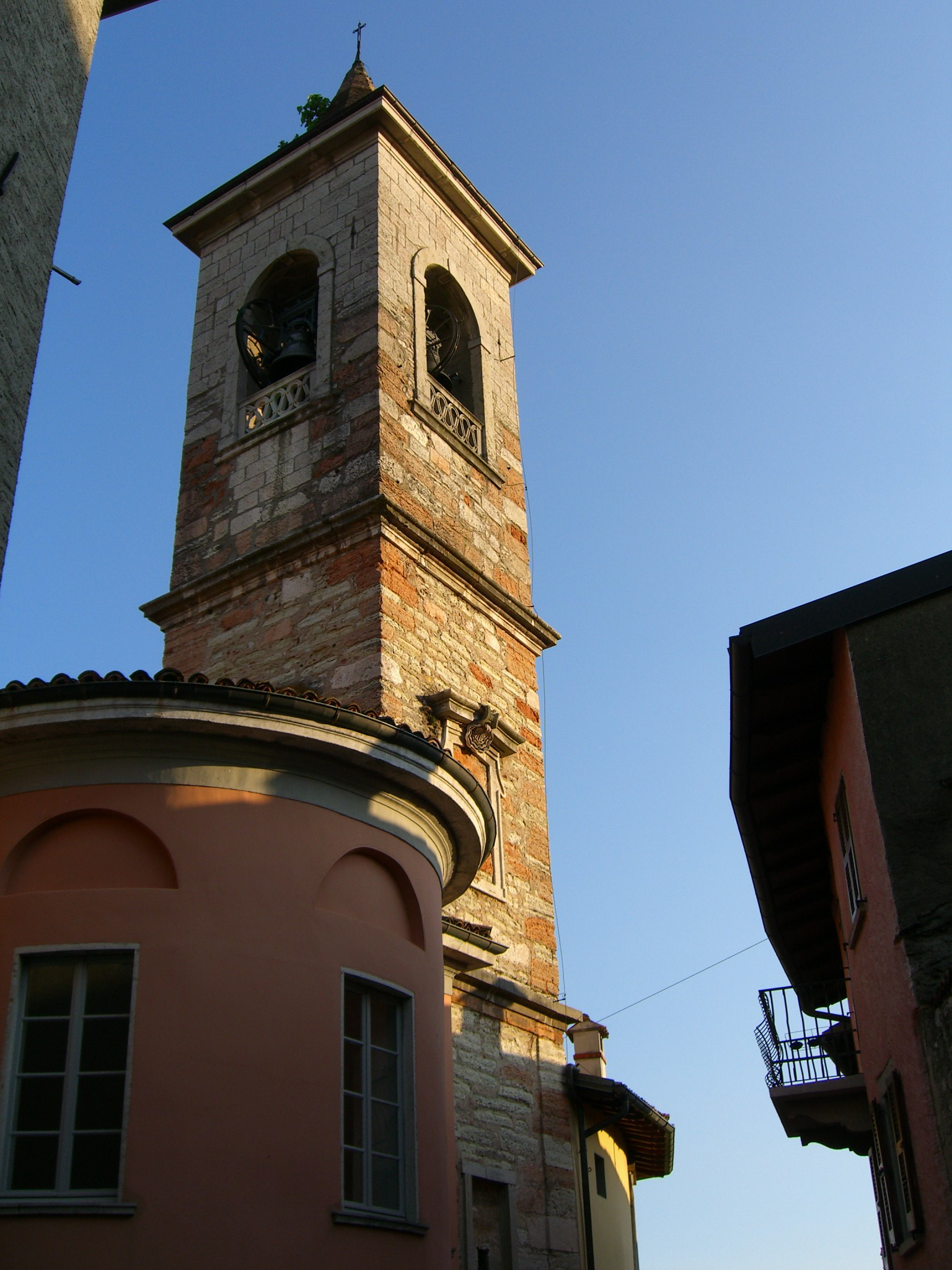
Church tower of Arzo
