= Fulvio Sulmoni =

Swiss footballer (born 1986)

Personal information
- Date of birth: 4 January 1986 (age 40)
- Place of birth: Mendrisio, Switzerland
- Height: 1.81 m (5 ft 11 in)
- Position: Defender

Youth career
- –2005: Team Ticino U18

Senior career*
Years	Team	Apps	(Gls)
2005–2010	FC Lugano	67	(2)
2010–2011	FC Locarno	23	(1)
2011–2012	FC Chiasso	28	(4)
2012–2014	AC Bellinzona	34	(2)
2013–2016	→ FC Thun (loan)	77	(7)
2016–2020	FC Lugano	94	(1)
- * Club domestic league appearances and goals

Fulvio Sulmoni (born 4 January 1986) is a Swiss former football defender. Sulmoni played for FC Lugano, FC Locarno, FC Chiasso, AC Bellinzona and FC Thun.
