= Agostino Maria Neuroni =

Italian Catholic bishop (1690–1760)

- Bishop of Como
- Church: Catholic Church
- Diocese: Como
- Appointed: 1746
- Term ended: 1760

Orders
- Ordination: 1713

Personal details
- Born: Cesare Filippo Bartolomeo Neuroni; February 19, 1690 Lugano, Old Swiss Confederacy
- Died: April 22, 1760 (aged 70) Como, Duchy of Milan
- Denomination: Roman Catholic
- Parents: Agostino Neuroni; Ludovica Gatti

Agostino Maria Neuroni (born Cesare Filippo Bartolomeo Neuroni; 19 February 1690 – 22 April 1760) was a Capuchin friar, preacher, and Catholic bishop who served as Bishop of Como from 1746 until his death. Born in Lugano to a notable family, he gained renown for his erudite and elegant Lenten sermons, which earned him the favor of Emperor Charles VI and led to his appointment as bishop by Pope Benedict XIV.

== Early life and education ==
Neuroni was born on 19 February 1690 in Lugano, the son of Agostino Neuroni, chancellor of Lugano and a colonel in the service of the Republic of Venice, and Ludovica Gatti, who came from a notable family of Valtellina. He received his education with the Somaschi Fathers in Lugano and at the Collegio Papio in Ascona.

== Religious career ==
In 1707, Neuroni entered the Capuchin order, professing his vows in 1708 and being ordained a priest in 1713. He served as guardian of the Capuchin convent in Mendrisio from 1731 to 1732.

As a teacher and preacher, Neuroni also authored occasional poetry. However, it was his erudite and elegant Lenten sermons that brought him particular fame. His reputation as a preacher earned him the favor of Emperor Charles VI, who summoned him to Vienna in 1732 and entrusted him with diplomatic missions.

== Bishop of Como ==
In 1746, Pope Benedict XIV appointed Neuroni as Bishop of Como. The following year, at the initiative of Gian Pietro Riva, the appointment was celebrated with a collection of poems. During his tenure as bishop, Neuroni founded the convent of the Capuchin Poor Clares of Saint Joseph in Lugano in 1747.

Neuroni served as Bishop of Como until his death on 22 April 1760 in the city.

== Bibliography ==
- HS, I/6, 198-199; V/2, 857
- Rusconi, G. Ecclesiastici ticinesi a Roma nel Settecento, 2006, pp. 73-105
