= Tipografia Elvetica =

The Tipografia e Libreria Elvetica of Capolago was a nineteenth-century publishing house in Canton Ticino, Switzerland.

== History ==
It operated from 1830 to 1853 and acquired particular importance as a clandestine press of the patriots of the Italian Risorgimento.

The Tipografia Elvetica was founded in 1830 by the Genoese exile Alessandro Repetti and directed by Gino Daelli. Thanks to its location on Swiss territory, close to the border with the Austrian-controlled Kingdom of Lombardy–Venetia, it rapidly became an important point of reference for the publication of patriotic works circulated clandestinely in Italy.

=== Collaborators and authors ===
The press enjoyed the collaboration of Giuseppe Mazzini and Luigi Dottesio, who gave a notable impulse to the printing of books, periodicals, and proclamations of Risorgimental patriots and exiles.

The main authors published included Vincenzo Gioberti, Francesco Domenico Guerrazzi, Giuseppe La Farina, Niccolò Tommaseo, Jean Charles Leonard Simonde de Sismondi, Friedrich Schiller, Pietro Colletta, Cesare Balbo and Massimo d'Azeglio.

In 1851 Luigi Dottesio was arrested and executed by the Austrians. The growing attention of the Swiss authorities, under Austrian pressure, forced Repetti to close down the Tipografia Elvetica in 1853.

== See also ==
- Publishing companies of Switzerland
- Risorgimento topics
