= Rocco Travella =

Swiss cyclist

Personal information
- Born: 30 June 1967 (age 59) Mendrisio, Switzerland

Cycling career
- Sport: Cycling

Rocco Travella (born 30 June 1967) is a Swiss former cyclist. He competed at the 1988 Summer Olympics and the 1992 Summer Olympics.
