= Capolago =

Coordinates: 45.902817°N 8.979499°E

- Village and Quarter
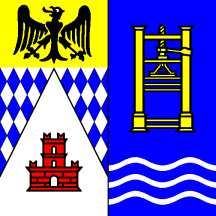
- Flag Coat of arms

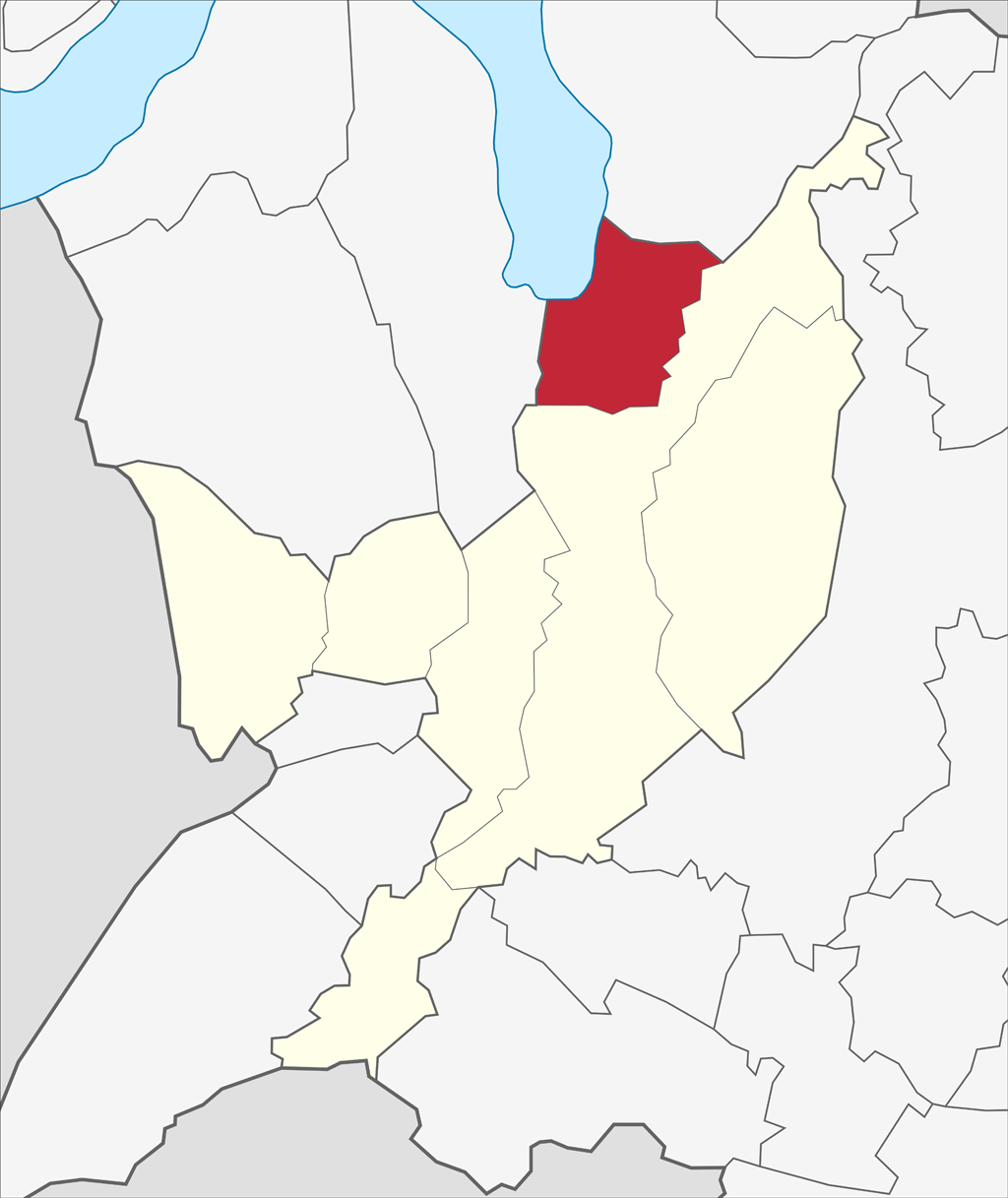
- Country: Switzerland
- Canton: Ticino
- District: Mendrisio
- City: Mendrisio

Area
  - Total: 1.77 km^{2} (0.68 sq mi)

Population (2011-12-31)
  - Total: 798
  - Density: 451/km^{2} (1,170/sq mi)

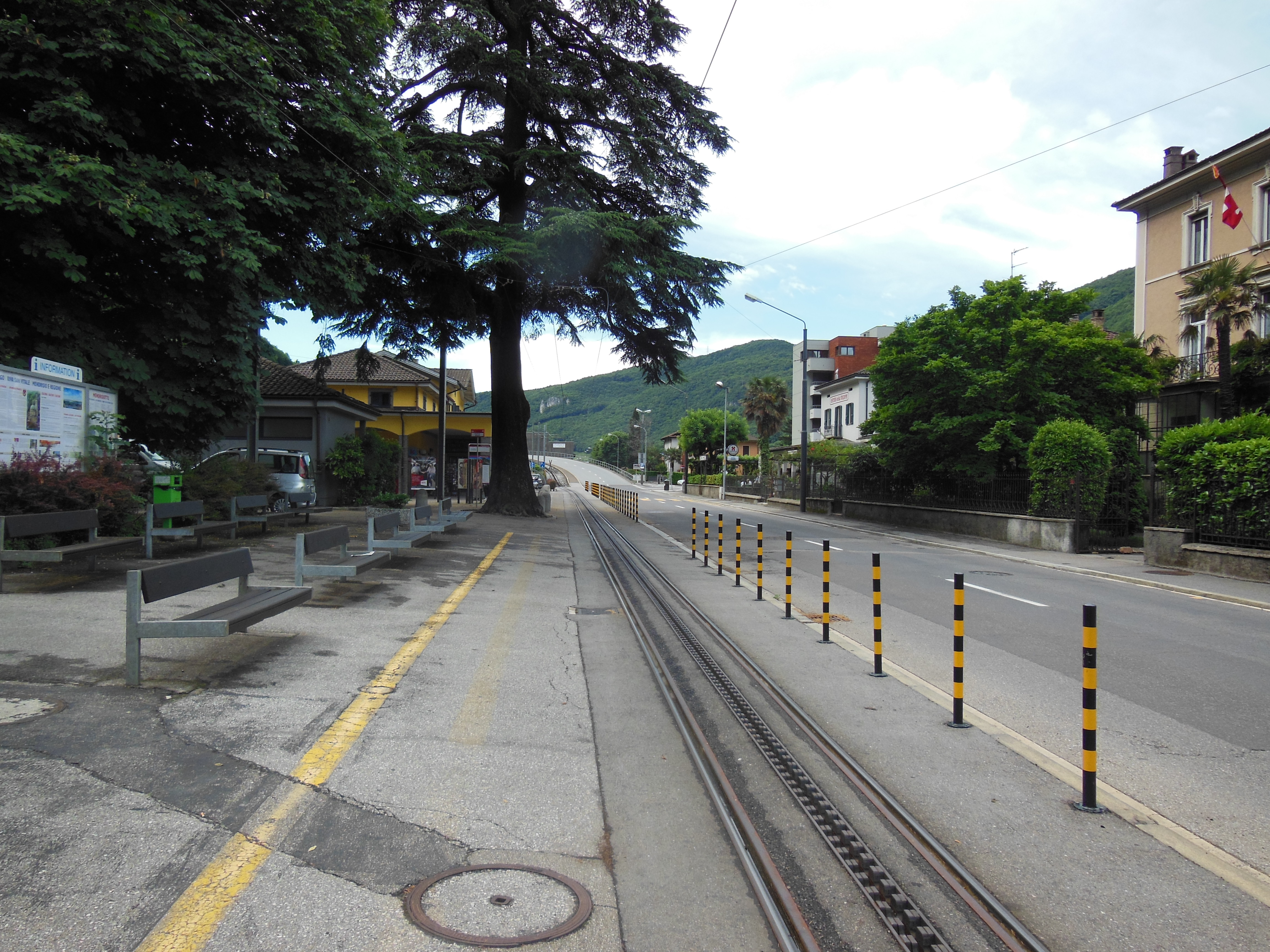
Looking south along Capolago's main street, with the railway station (in yellow) and the track of Monte Generoso railway

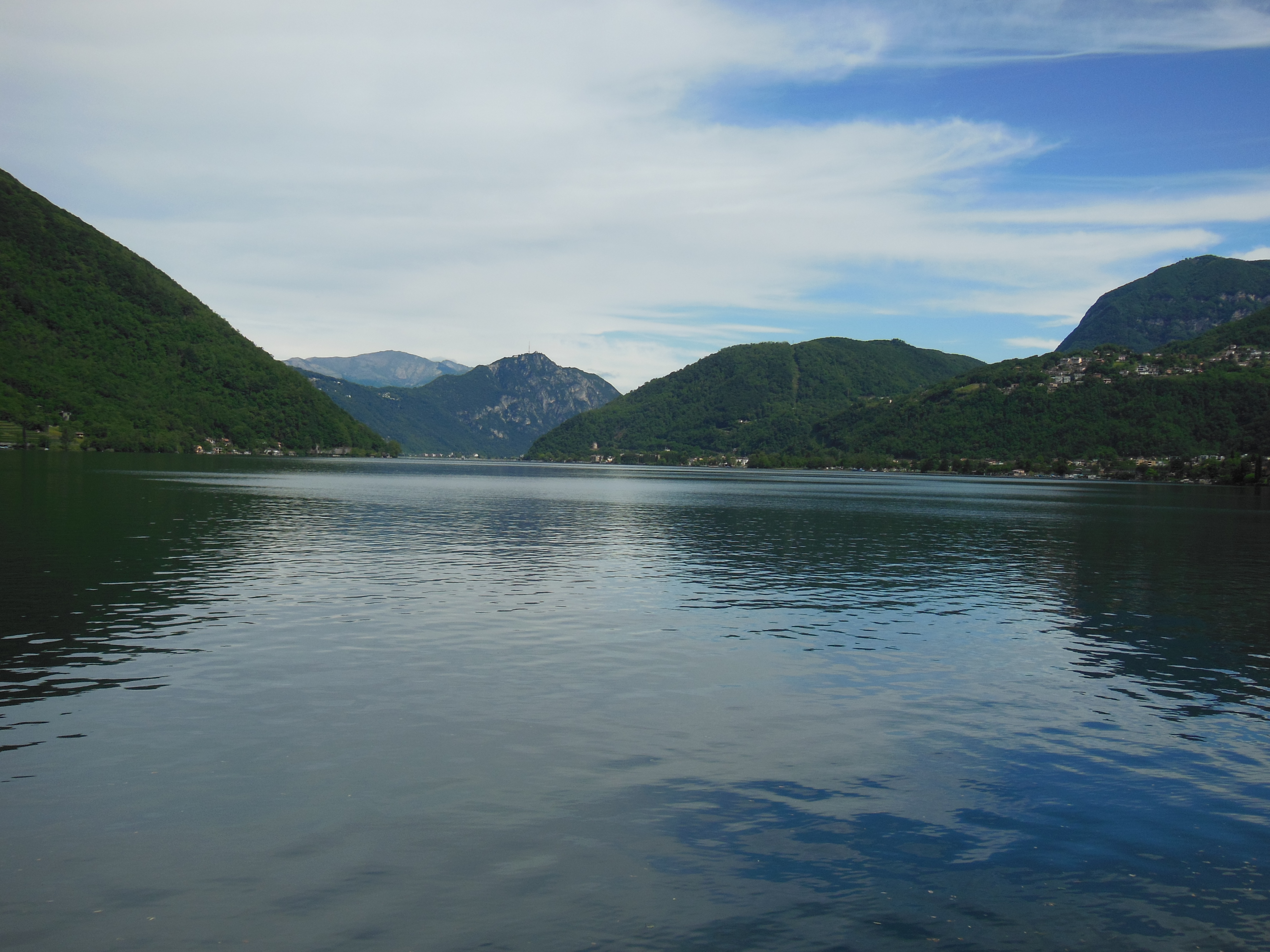
Looking north from Capolago Lago landing along Lake Lugano towards Monte San Salvatore

Capolago is a village situated at the south-eastern extremity of Lake Lugano, in the Swiss canton of Ticino. Originally a municipality in its own right, Capolago is now a quarter of the municipality of Mendrisio, itself part of the district of Mendrisio.

== History ==
Aerial view (1964)

The first mention of the name of Capolago appears before 1300, in the general statutes of Como. In 1365, Capolago assumed greater importance due to the building of castle. The castle was dismantled in 1517. From then on, the village was largely concerned with fishing, and the ferrying of people and goods to and from Lugano.

In 1556, Capolago was the birthplace of the architect Carlo Maderno. He is best remembered as one of the fathers of Baroque architecture, responsible for the façades of St. Peter's Basilica, Santa Susanna, and Sant'Andrea della Valle, all in Rome.

The construction of the Melide causeway, in 1841, followed by the opening of the local part of the Gotthard Railway, in 1874, saw changes to Capolago. The main road and railway brought better transport connections, but also reduced the need for boat services on the lake. However the opening of the Monte Generoso railway, in 1890, strengthened tourist traffic.

In 1910, the Mendrisio electric tramway opened, linking a northern terminus in Riva San Vitale with Capolago, Mendrisio, Balerna and Chiasso. The section of the line in Capolago closed in 1948 and was replaced by a bus service.

The town was also home to the historically important Tipografia Elvetica press, which published propaganda during the Italian Risorgimento. In 1891, the town hosted the Italian anarchist Capolago congress, attended by anarchists including Pietro Gori, Amilcare Cipriani, Francesco Saverio Merlino, and Errico Malatesta.

In November 2007, the then independent municipalities of Arzo, Capolago, Genestrerio, Mendrisio, Rancate and Tremona voted to merge into the municipality of Mendrisio. The merger took place in April 2009.

== Transport ==
Capolago has a station, Capolago-Riva San Vitale, on the Gotthard line of the Swiss Federal Railways. The station is served by route S10 of the Treni Regionali Ticino Lombardia (TILO), which operate every half-hour between Bellinzona, Lugano and Chiasso, with some trains extending northwards to Airolo and southwards to Milan. The station is served also by the Monte Generoso railway, a mountain railway that climbs to the summit of the nearby Monte Generoso.

Capolago also has a landing stage (Capolago Lago) that is served, once or twice a day, by the boats of the Società Navigazione del Lago di Lugano and by the trains of the Monte Generoso railway.

Buses of the Autolinea Mendrisiense and AutoPostale serve stops outside the station, providing links to Arogno, Brusino Arsizio, Melano, Mendrisio, Porto Ceresio, Riva San Vitale and Rovio.
