= Pietro Gori =

Italian anarchist writer (1865–1911)

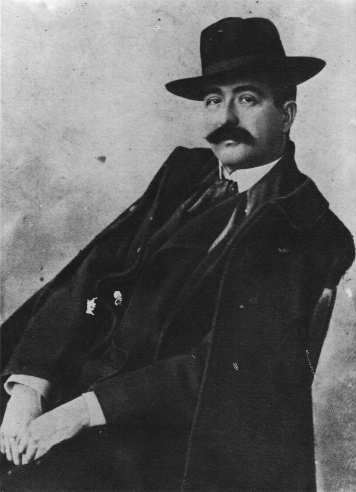
- Born: 14 August 1865; Messina, Sicily, Italy
- Died: 8 January 1911 (aged 45); Portoferraio, Tuscany, Italy
- Education: University of Pisa
- Occupations: Lawyer, journalist
- Political party: Socialist Revolutionary Anarchist Party
- Other political affiliations: Argentine Regional Workers' Federation
- Movement: Anarchism

Pietro Gori (1865–1911) was an Italian lawyer, journalist, poet and anarchist activist.

== Biography ==
Pietro Gori was born on 14 August 1865, in the Sicilian city of Messina. He was raised in Tuscany by a middle class family, which had participated in the Risorgimento. He was educated at a school in Livorno, before going on to study law at the University of Pisa. He graduated in 1889, after defending his thesis in which he argued that crime was caused by poverty. During his studies, he had joined the Italian anarchist movement and began writing political tracts. In 1890, he was arrested at an International Workers' Day demonstration in Livorno and imprisoned for a number of months. After his release, he established himself as a criminal lawyer and defended several anarchist activists from prosecution. Through his work, he developed his skills as an orator, making him into a popular public speaker at political rallies.

In 1891, he co-founded the Socialist Revolutionary Anarchist Party (PSAR) and began publishing poetry and the newspaper L'Amico del populo, although it was shuttered after only six issues. At the founding congress of the Italian Socialist Party in 1892, Gori and other anarchist delegates criticised the party's reformist currents, leading to a split between the reformists and the libertarian socialists. He was subsequently expelled from the Socialist International, having protested the social democrats' expulsion of anarchists from the organisation's Third Congress.

Ahead of the introduction of anti-anarchist laws by the government of Francesco Crispi, on 8 July 1894, Gori fled Italy to the Swiss city of Lugano, where he became a leading figure among Italian anarchist exiles. He travelled through Germany, Belgium and the Netherlands, before arriving in London, where he met other exiled anarchist figures including Errico Malatesta and Peter Kropotkin. He then undertook a lecture tour of the United States, before returning to Italy and rejoining the anarchist movement. He supported a united front with socialist parties to defend civil liberties, but continued to oppose collaboration with the government. His stay in Italy was brief, as social unrest forced him to leave again.

He emigrated to Argentina, where he published the magazine Criminologia moderna. After the assassination of Umberto I of Italy by Gaetano Bresci, he published an exposition of his utopian political ideas. He also gave lecture tours throughout south America, boosting the popularity of anarchism, which culminated with the founding of the Argentine Regional Workers' Federation (FORA) in 1901.

After an amnesty was proclaimed in Italy, Gori returned to his home country. Together with Luigi Fabbri, he published the magazine Il Pensiero. He called for the unification of the working class at a meeting of syndicalists in Bologna in 1905. Gori gave his last speech, in commemoration of the executed anarchist Francesc Ferrer, in Portoferraio on 14 November 1909. He died there in 1911. His funeral was attended by workers from throughout Tuscany.

== Bibliography ==
- Bertolucci, Franco (2009). "Gori, Pietro (1865–1911)". In Ness, Immanuel (ed.). The International Encyclopedia of Revolution and Protest. pp. 1419–1420. doi:10.1002/9781405198073.wbierp0637. ISBN 978-1-4051-8464-9.
- Manfredi, Marco (2017). "Italian Anarchism and Popular Culture: History of a Close Relationship". In Favretto, Ilaria; Itçaina, Xabier (eds.). Protest, Popular Culture and Tradition in Modern and Contemporary Western Europe. Palgrave MacMillan. pp. 103–123. doi:10.1057/978-1-137-50737-2_6. ISBN 978-1-137-50736-5.
