= Mendrisio =

- Municipality
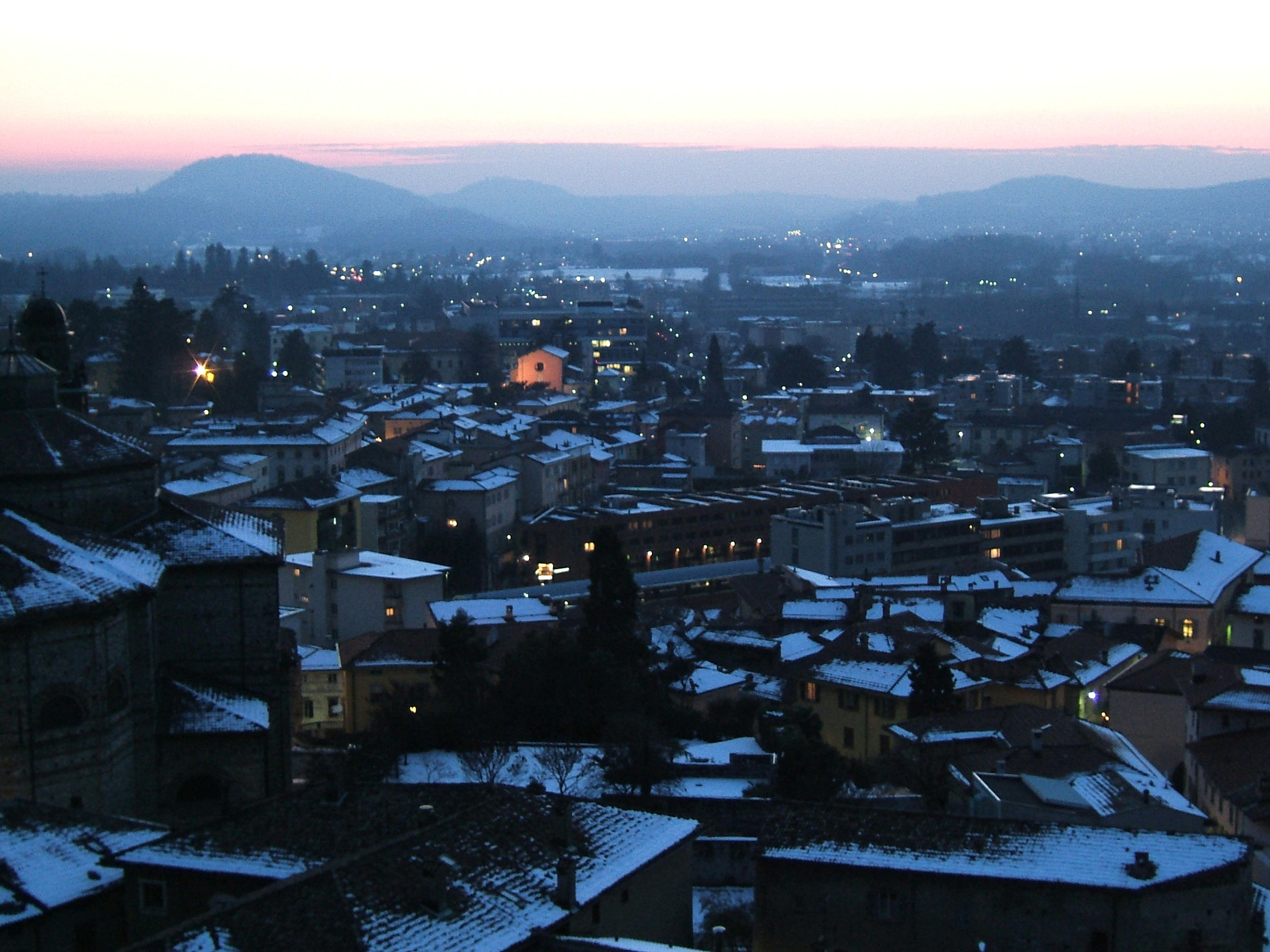
- Mendrisio during the winter

- Flag Coat of arms
- Location of Mendrisio
- Location within Switzerland Location within Canton of Ticino
- Coordinates: 45°52′N 8°59′E
- Country: Switzerland
- Canton: Ticino
- District: Mendrisio

Government
  - Executive: Municipio with 7 members
  - Mayor: Sindaco (list); Samuele Cavadini
  - Parliament: Consiglio comunale with 60 members

Area
  - Total: 11.7 km^{2} (4.5 sq mi)
- Elevation: 354 m (1,161 ft)

Population (December 2007)
  - Total: 11,496
  - Density: 983/km^{2} (2,540/sq mi)
- Time zone: UTC+01:00 (CET)
  - Summer (DST): UTC+02:00 (CEST)
- Postal code: 6850
- SFOS number: 5254
- ISO 3166 code: CH-TI
- Localities: Arzo, Capolago, Genestrerio, Rancate, Salorino, Tremona, Besazio, Ligornetto, Meride
- Surrounded by: Castel San Pietro, Coldrerio, Genestrerio, Novazzano, Melano, Riva San Vitale
- Website: mendrisio.ch

Mendrisio (Italian: [menˈdriːzjo]; Lombard: Mendrís [menˈdriːs]) is a municipality in the district of Mendrisio in the canton of Ticino in Switzerland.

Mendrisio is the seat of the Accademia di Architettura of the university of Italian-speaking Switzerland (USI).

The municipality was boosted in size on 4 April 2004 when it incorporated the former municipality of Salorino. On 5 April 2009 it incorporated the former municipalities of Arzo, Capolago, Genestrerio, Rancate and Tremona. On 14 April 2013 the former municipalities of Besazio, Ligornetto and Meride merged into the municipality of Mendrisio.

Mendrisio is served by Mendrisio railway station and Mendrisio San Martino railway station.

== History ==
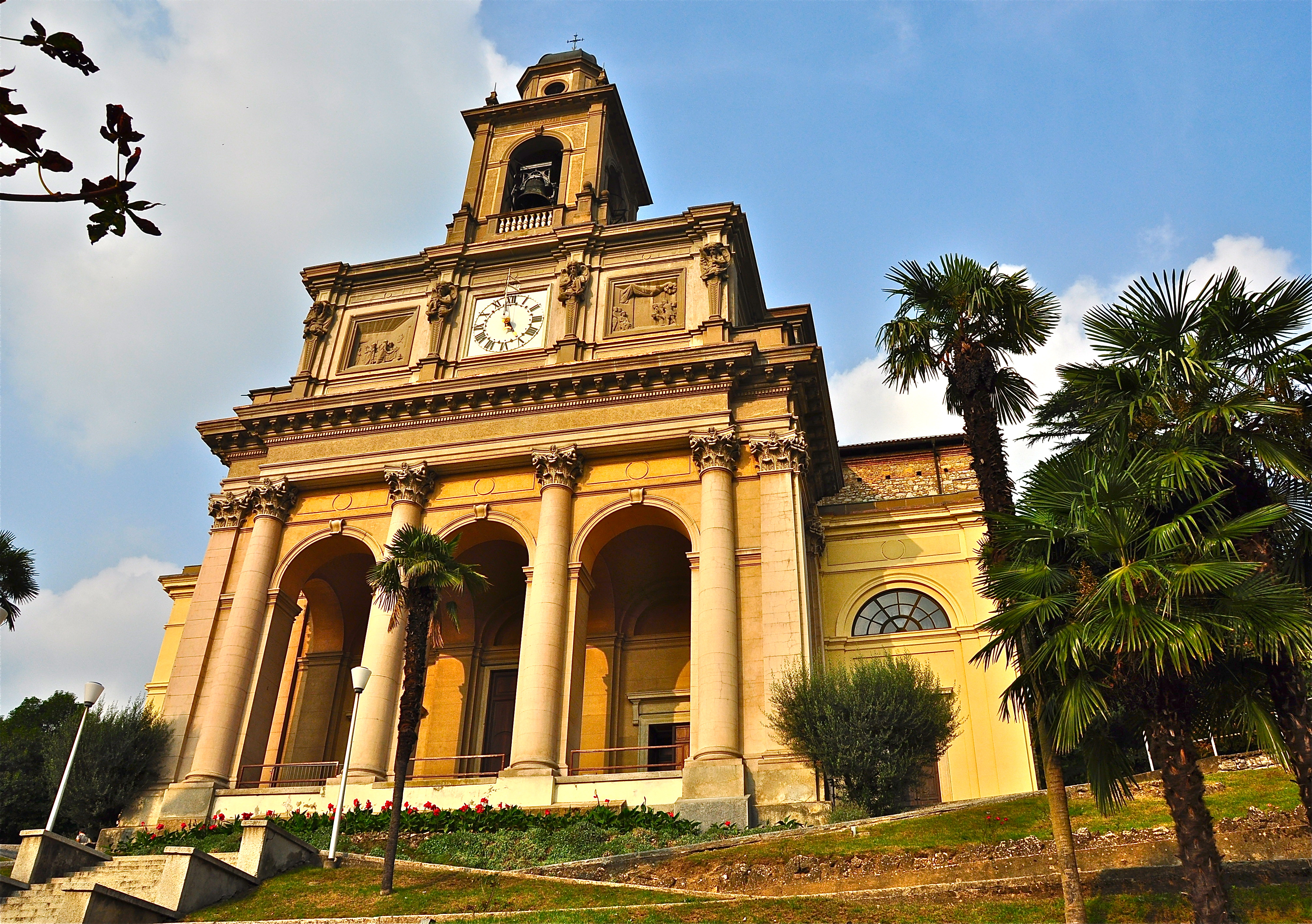
Classicist Church of SS. Cosma e Damiano

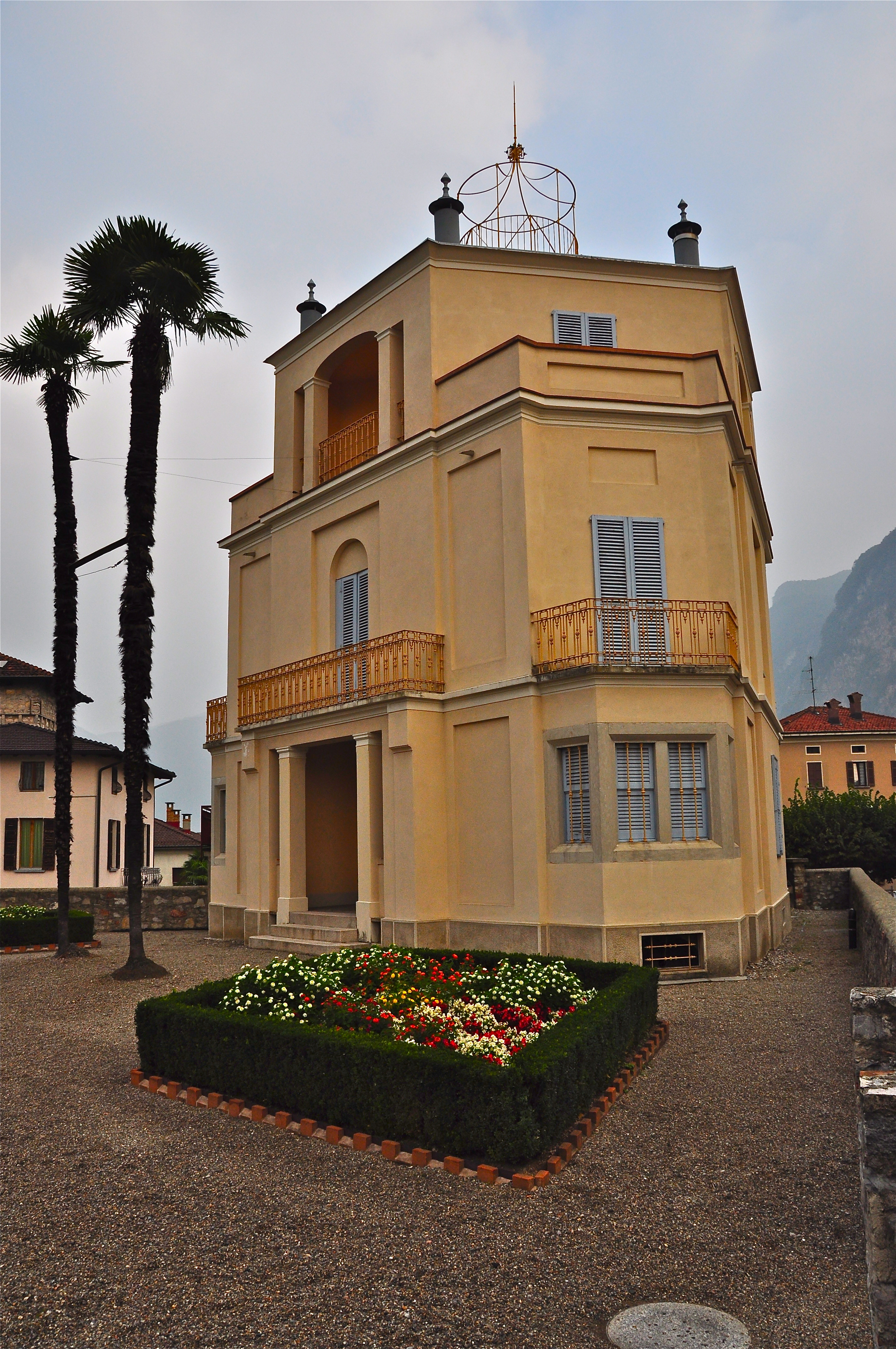
Casa Croci, a villa built in 1873 as the town grew wealthy from factories.

Mendrisio was first mentioned in 793 as Mendrici and was also known by its German name, Mendris though this name is no longer used. However, the area was inhabited during the Roman era. Around thirty tombs, a villa and coins from a Roman settlement have been discovered in the area. Following the collapse of the Roman Empire, Mendrisio was the center of a Lombard district and grew into a town. During the Middle Ages, several fortifications were built on the valley floor between the Porta S. Giovanni and the Moree river. In the Late Middle Ages the Torriani family built their castle on the rocky hills above the town. Mendrisio became an independent town in the County of Seprio in 1140. The county was taken over by Como three decades later in 1170. Como ruled over Mendrisio until 1335, when Como was brought under Milan's control. Mendrisio then remained under Milanese control until 1402. At some point in the 15th century, the town was given as a fief to the Rusca and Sanseverino families.

In the late 15th and early 16th century, the Swiss Confederation canton of Uri began expanding down into the Leventina valley. After a number of setbacks, by 1512 Uri and the rest of the Confederation captured the city of Lugano and incorporated the Landvogtei of Mendrisio. Nine years later, in 1521, the Swiss Confederation established a system of shared responsibility over the Italian Bailiwicks and appointed a bailiff to manage Mendrisio. Mendrisio remained a conquered territory with limited autonomy and rights until the 1798 French invasion and the creation of the Helvetic Republic.

Despite Mendrisio's early growth, it remained a part of the large parish of Balerna until the 15th century. Over the following years, two parishes were formed in the town, under the parish churches of SS Cosma e Damiano and S. Sisinio. The Church of SS Cosma e Damiano was built in the Baroque style in 1672. The first building was demolished in the 19th century and a new Classicist style church was built nearby in 1863–75. The church of S. Sisino was built outside the town in the village of La Torre. A number of religious orders also settled in Mendrisio, including the Humiliati, the Servite Order, the Ursulines and the Capuchins. The Servites established a boys school in 1644 in the Convent of S. Giovanni. In 1852 that school became a cantonal secondary school. During the 19th century the religious orders' convents and monasteries were all secularized.

In the past century, the town has expanded away from the Moree river and developed a large industrial sector. During the late 19th century, one of the first factories in town, the Torriani-Bolzani spinning mill employed about 350 women and children (over 10% of the population in 1900). The factories brought jobs to the town and encouraged villagers to move into Mendrisio. The population doubled over the last 60 years of the 19th century. Wealthy industrialists built large villas and the Beata Vergine hospital. The construction of a railroad through the town brought more residents and industry. During the 20th century, a number of service companies opened in the town and industry began to decline. In 2000 almost three-quarters of the working population worked in the services sector. Mendrisio's location near the Italian border means that many of the residents and workers are cross-border commuters.

As a district capital, Mendrisio provides services for the surrounding communities. A neuro-psychiatric clinic was opened in 1898. This was followed by primary and secondary schools in 1944 and in 1996 the School of Architecture (Accademia di Architettura di Mendrisio) of the Università della Svizzera italiana opened thanks to Mario Botta.

== Geography ==
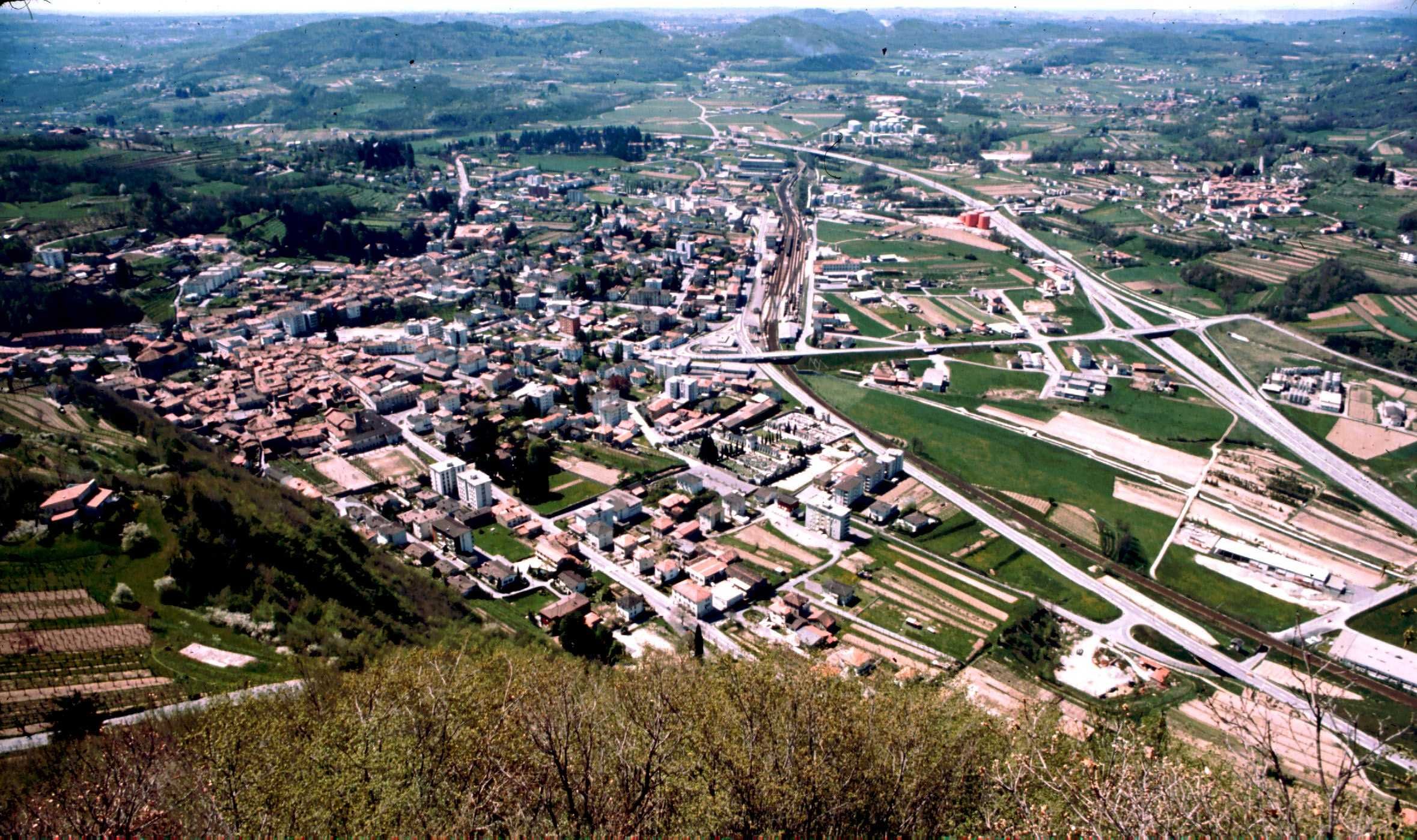
Mendrisio in the early 70s

Aerial view (1964)

Following the 2013 merger, Mendrisio has an area of 31.77 km^{2} (12.27 sq mi).

Mendrisio had an area, as of 1997, of 11.71 square kilometers (4.52 sq mi). Of this area, 1.74 km^{2} (0.67 sq mi) or 14.9% is used for agricultural purposes, while 3.16 km^{2} (1.22 sq mi) or 27.0% is forested. Of the rest of the land, 2.59 km^{2} (1.00 sq mi) or 22.1% is settled (buildings or roads), 0.03 km^{2} (7.4 acres) or 0.3% is either rivers or lakes and 0.05 km^{2} (12 acres) or 0.4% is unproductive land.

Of the built up area, industrial buildings made up 2.8% of the total area while housing and buildings made up 10.2% and transportation infrastructure made up 7.7%. Out of the forested land, 24.9% of the total land area is heavily forested and 2.0% is covered with orchards or small clusters of trees. Of the agricultural land, 3.5% is used for growing crops, while 1.2% is used for orchards or vine crops and 10.2% is used for alpine pastures. All the water in the municipality is flowing water. Of the unproductive areas, and .

The municipality is the capital of the Mendrisio district. It is located on the slopes of Monte Generoso. In 2004, it absorbed Salorino. In 2009, it added Arzo, Capolago, Genestrerio, Rancate and Tremona and in 2013 it expanded again with Besazio, Ligornetto and Meride.

== Coat of arms ==
The blazon of the municipal coat of arms is Gules a cross argent.

== Demographics ==
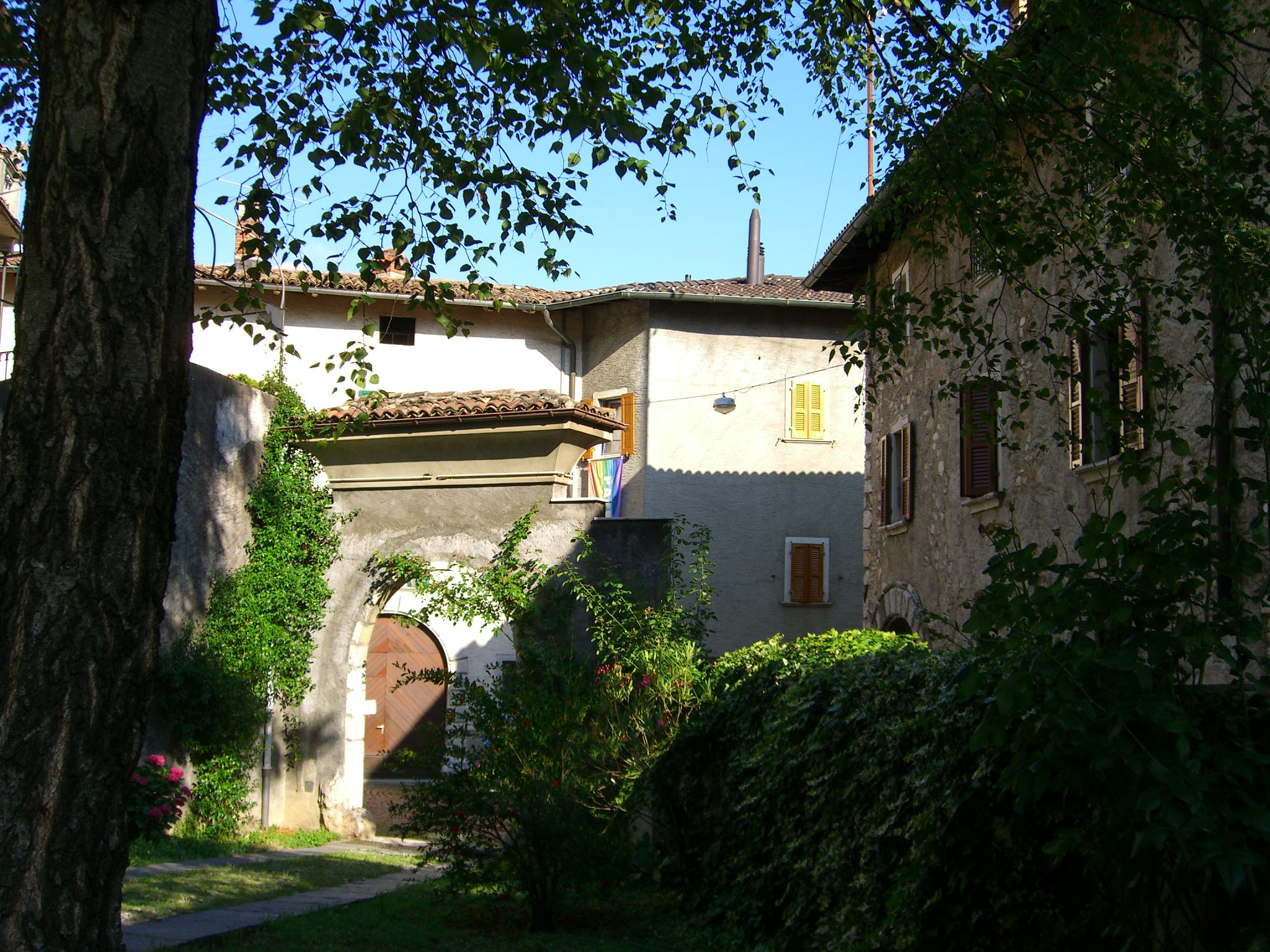
House in Arzo village

Mendrisio has a population (as of December 2020) of 14,902. As of 2008, 23.5% of the population are resident foreign nationals. Over the last 10 years (1997–2007) the population has changed at a rate of 4.8%.

Most of the population (as of 2000) speaks Italian (87.5%), with German being second most common (4.8%) and French being third (1.4%). Of the Swiss national languages (as of 2000), 285 speak German, 78 people speak French, 5,369 people speak Italian, and 8 people speak Romansh. The remainder (406 people) speak another language.

As of 2008, the gender distribution of the population was 47.5% male and 52.5% female. The population was made up of 4,309 Swiss men (37.3% of the population), and 1,186 (10.3%) non-Swiss men. There were 4,942 Swiss women (42.7%), and 1,124 (9.7%) non-Swiss women.

In 2008 there were 56 live births to Swiss citizens and 8 births to non-Swiss citizens, and in same time span there were 57 deaths of Swiss citizens and 12 non-Swiss citizen deaths. Ignoring immigration and emigration, the population of Swiss citizens decreased by 1 while the foreign population decreased by 4. There were 2 Swiss men who emigrated from Switzerland and 1 Swiss woman who immigrated back to Switzerland. At the same time, there were 55 non-Swiss men and 27 non-Swiss women who immigrated from another country to Switzerland. The total Swiss population change in 2008 (from all sources, including moves across municipal borders) was an increase of 7 and the non-Swiss population change was an increase of 9 people. This represents a population growth rate of 0.2%.

The age distribution, as of 2009, in Mendrisio is; 986 children or 8.5% of the population are between 0 and 9 years old and 1,069 teenagers or 9.2% are between 10 and 19. Of the adult population, 1,337 people or 11.6% of the population are between 20 and 29 years old. 1,574 people or 13.6% are between 30 and 39, 1,865 people or 16.1% are between 40 and 49, and 1,414 people or 12.2% are between 50 and 59. The senior population distribution is 1,446 people or 12.5% of the population are between 60 and 69 years old, 1,099 people or 9.5% are between 70 and 79, there are 771 people or 6.7% who are over 80.

As of 2000, there were 2,992 private households in the municipality, and an average of 2.1 persons per household. In 2000 there were 431 single family homes (or 43.1% of the total) out of a total of 1,000 inhabited buildings. There were 403 multi-family buildings (40.3%), along with 97 multi-purpose buildings that were mostly used for housing (9.7%) and 69 other use buildings (commercial or industrial) that also had some housing (6.9%). Of the single family homes 20 were built before 1919, while 31 were built between 1990 and 2000. The greatest number of single family homes (162) were built between 1946 and 1960.

In 2000 there were 3,049 apartments in the municipality. The most common apartment size was 3 rooms of which there were 934. There were 185 single room apartments and 584 apartments with five or more rooms. Of these apartments, a total of 2,736 apartments (89.7% of the total) were permanently occupied, while 248 apartments (8.1%) were seasonally occupied and 65 apartments (2.1%) were empty. The vacancy rate for the municipality, in 2008, was 1.28%. As of 2007, the construction rate of new housing units was 5.5 new units per 1000 residents.

As of 2003 the average price to rent an average apartment in Mendrisio was 873.89 Swiss francs (CHF) per month (US$700, £390, €560 approx. exchange rate from 2003). The average rate for a one-room apartment was 491.07 CHF (US$390, £220, €310), a two-room apartment was about 646.96 CHF (US$520, £290, €410), a three-room apartment was about 806.94 CHF (US$650, £360, €520) and a six or more room apartment cost an average of 1544.67 CHF (US$1240, £700, €990). The average apartment price in Mendrisio was 78.3% of the national average of 1116 CHF.

The historical population is given in the following chart:

== Heritage sites of national significance ==
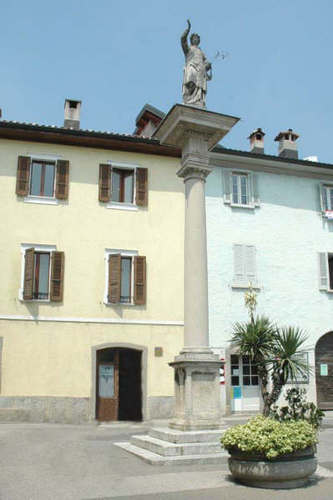
Rancate village

Mendrisio is home to a number of Swiss heritage sites of national significance. The list includes three churches; the Church of S. Sisinio alla Torre, the Church of S. Martino, and the complex of S. Giovanni, which includes a convent, the Church of S. Giovanni and the Oratory of S. Maria. There are six stately houses or palaces on the list; the Croci House, the Dei Pagani Tre Buchi House, Palazzo Pollini, Palazzo Torriani, Villa Argentina and the Villa and mosaics of S. Maria in Borgo. The rest of the list consists of the Pinacoteca cantonale Giovanni Züst or Giovanni Züst Art Gallery and the Tremona archeological site. The 2013 mergers added the Museo Vela from Ligornetto and the Church of S. Silvestro from Meride. The villages of Ligornetto and Meride were added to the Inventory of Swiss Heritage Sites.

=== Sights ===
Mendrisio is known in Italian as il magnifico borgo (the magnificent town) due to its numerous elegant historical buildings. For two decades the town has had a pioneering role in promoting electric cars. The city's surroundings are the main wine-growing regions in Canton Ticino.

The city is also known for its typical Good Friday procession (included by UNESCO in the intangible world heritage lists from 2019), when a live recreation of Christ's passion is enacted (without any blood or violence), and also for the grape festival (called Sagra dell'uva) which takes place in late September.

== Politics ==
In the 2007 federal election the most popular party was the CVP which received 37.58% of the vote. The next three most popular parties were the FDP (27.5%), the SP (13.6%) and the Ticino League (9.24%). In the federal election, a total of 2,738 votes were cast, and the voter turnout was 59.3%.

In the 2007 Gran Consiglio election, there were a total of 4,635 registered voters in Mendrisio, of which 3,292 or 71.0% voted. 63 blank ballots and 6 null ballots were cast, leaving 3,223 valid ballots in the election. The most popular party was the PPD+GenGiova which received 1,012 or 31.4% of the vote. The next three most popular parties were; the PLRT (with 868 or 26.9%), the SSI (with 440 or 13.7%) and the PS (with 422 or 13.1%).

In the 2007 Consiglio di Stato election, 46 blank ballots and 10 null ballots were cast, leaving 3,236 valid ballots in the election. The most popular party was the PPD which received 1,010 or 31.2% of the vote. The next three most popular parties were; the PLRT (with 837 or 25.9%), the PS (with 501 or 15.5%) and the SSI (with 401 or 12.4%).

== Sport ==
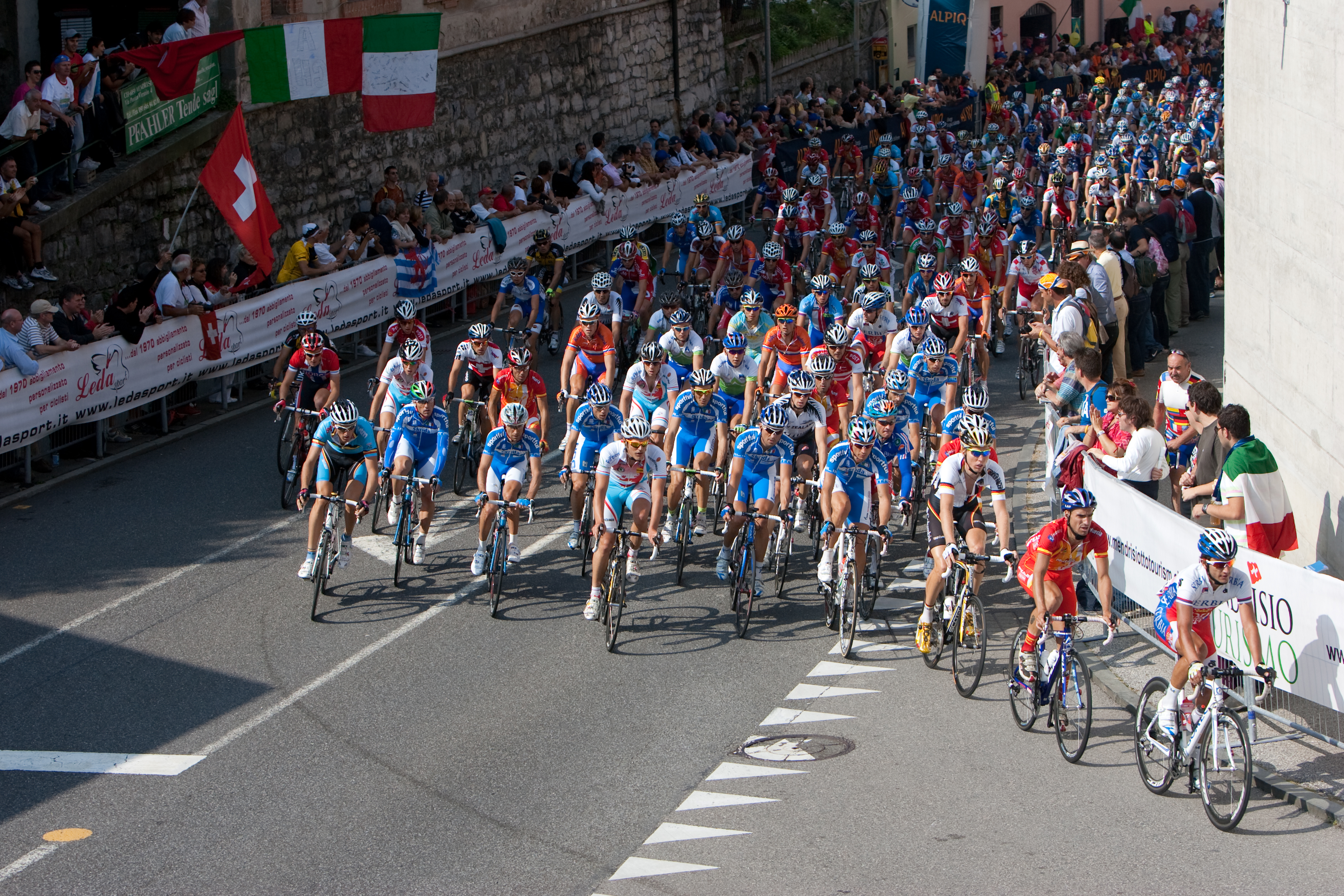
2009 UCI Road World Championship

FC Mendrisio-Stabio is the municipality's football club, which plays in the Swiss 1st League.

Cycling's 1971 UCI Road World Championships was held in Mendrisio 4 September 1971. Cycling's 2009 UCI Road World Championships was held in Mendrisio from 23 to 27 September 2009. Cadel Evans who himself lives in Mendrisio district with his family won the Gold medal of the men's event.

== Economy ==
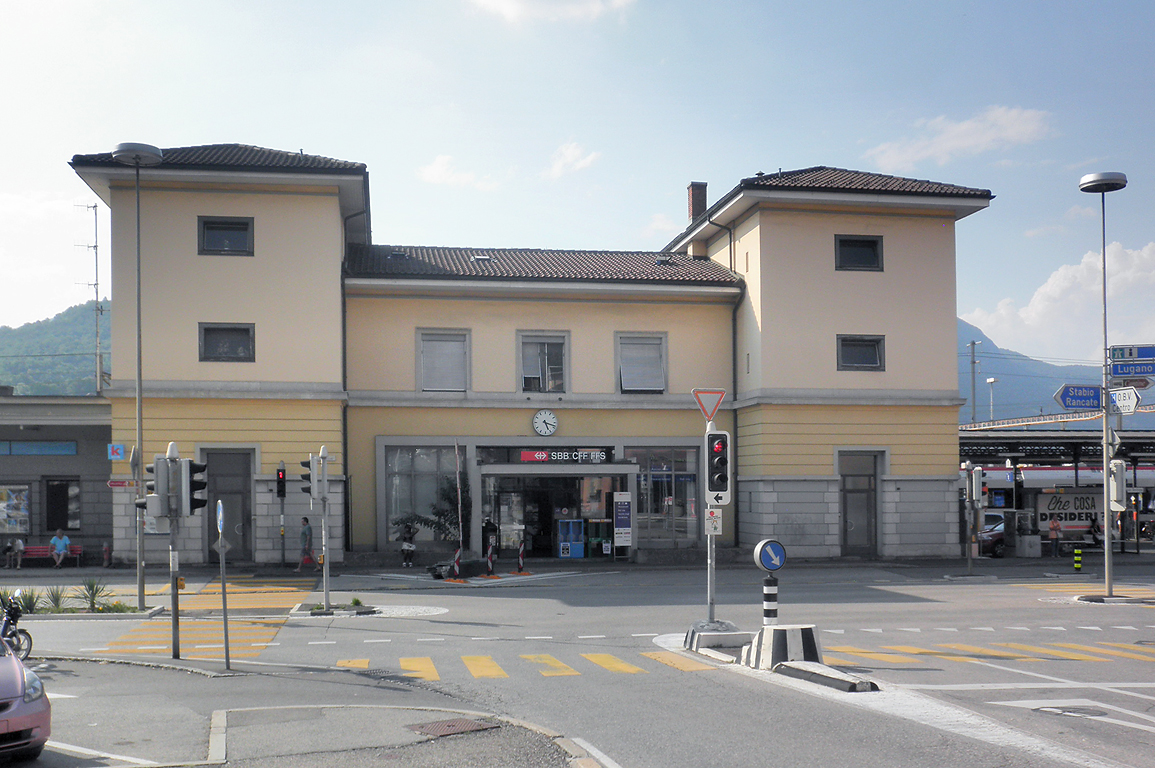
Mendrisio railroad station

As of 2007, Mendrisio had an unemployment rate of 3.23%. As of 2005, there were 48 people employed in the primary economic sector and about 17 businesses involved in this sector. 3,787 people were employed in the secondary sector and there were 133 businesses in this sector. 4,919 people were employed in the tertiary sector, with 538 businesses in this sector. There were 2,665 residents of the municipality who were employed in some capacity, of which females made up 43.5% of the workforce.

In 2008 the total number of full-time equivalent jobs was 9,032. The number of jobs in the primary sector was 20, of which 18 were in agriculture and 2 were in forestry or lumber production. The number of jobs in the secondary sector was 4,494, of which 4,055 or (90.2%) were in manufacturing and 373 (8.3%) were in construction. The number of jobs in the tertiary sector was 4,518. In the tertiary sector; 1,240 or 27.4% were in wholesale or retail sales or the repair of motor vehicles, 126 or 2.8% were in the movement and storage of goods, 322 or 7.1% were in a hotel or restaurant, 96 or 2.1% were in the information industry, 185 or 4.1% were the insurance or financial industry, 275 or 6.1% were technical professionals or scientists, 334 or 7.4% were in education and 1,266 or 28.0% were in health care.

In 2000, there were 10,078 workers who commuted into the municipality and 1,394 workers who commuted away. The municipality is a net importer of workers, with about 7.2 workers entering the municipality for every one leaving. About 33.4% of the workforce coming into Mendrisio are coming from outside Switzerland, while 1.4% of the locals commute out of Switzerland for work. Of the working population, 10.3% used public transportation to get to work, and 56.4% used a private car.

As of 2009, there were 12 hotels in Mendrisio with a total of 239 rooms and 502 beds.

The winemaker Vinattieri Ticinesi, which produces merlot, is the largest in Switzerland. Household goods multinational Metaltex has its headquarters in Mendrisio. There are four gold refining factories; however, many of their technical employees commute from Italy. Both Italy and Switzerland are major markets for refined gold which is used in the manufacture of watches and jewellery. About 7,500 workers from Italy commute daily to Mendrisio.

== Religion ==
From the 2000 census, 4,982 or 81.1% were Roman Catholic, while 279 or 4.5% belonged to the Swiss Reformed Church. There are 665 individuals (or about 10.82% of the population) who belong to another church (not listed on the census), and 220 individuals (or about 3.58% of the population) did not answer the question.

== Education ==
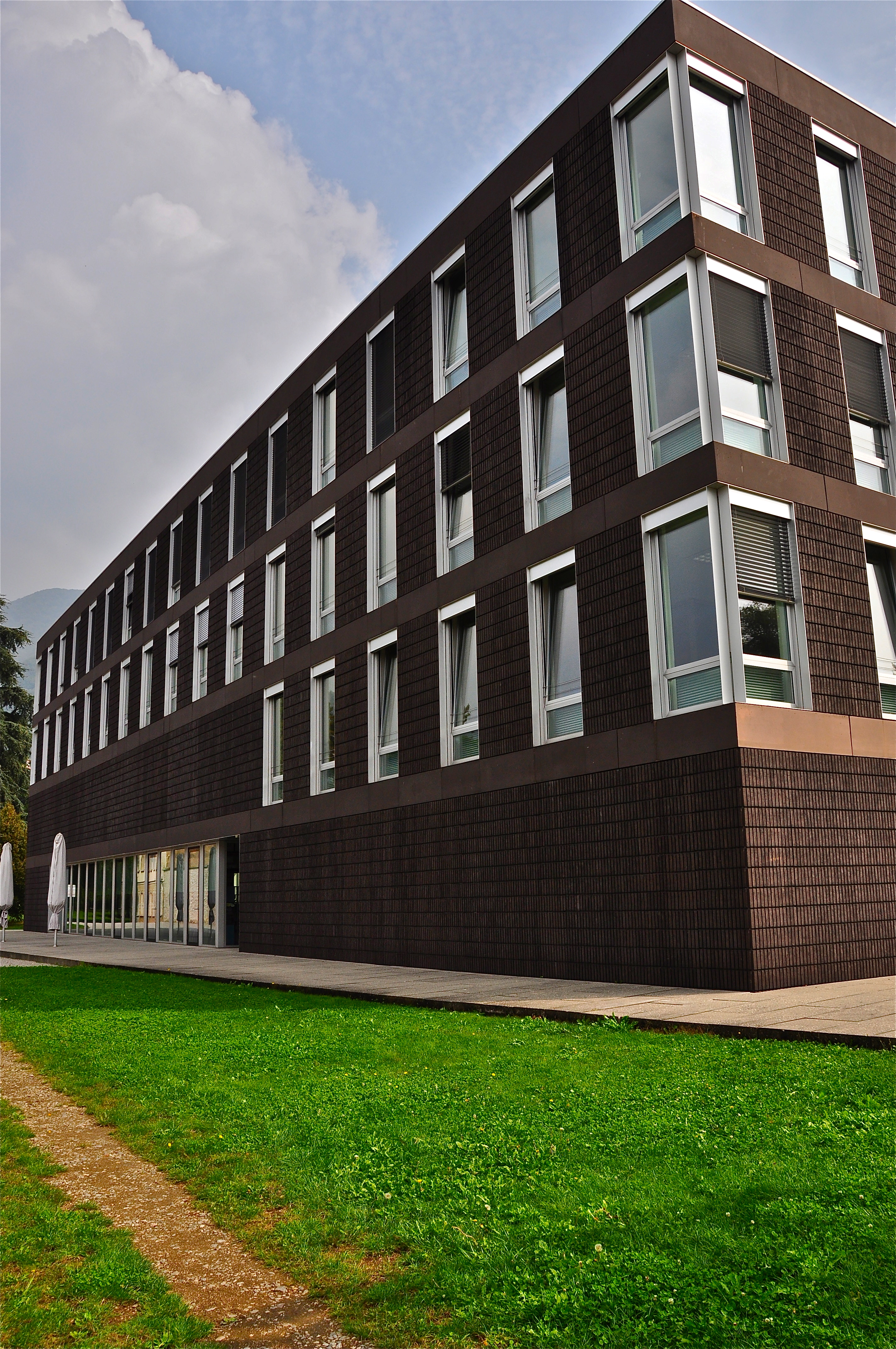
The Accademia di Architettura di Mendrisio school in Mendrisio

In Mendrisio about 65.6% of the population (between age 25–64) have completed either non-mandatory upper secondary education or additional higher education (either university or a Fachhochschule).

In Mendrisio there were a total of 1,651 students (as of 2009). The Ticino education system provides up to three years of non-mandatory kindergarten and in Mendrisio there were 278 children in kindergarten. The primary school program lasts for five years and includes both a standard school and a special school. In the municipality, 485 students attended the standard primary schools and 19 students attended the special school. In the lower secondary school system, students either attend a two-year middle school followed by a two-year pre-apprenticeship or they attend a four-year program to prepare for higher education. There were 405 students in the two-year middle school and 4 in their pre-apprenticeship, while 178 students were in the four-year advanced program.

The upper secondary school includes several options, but at the end of the upper secondary program, a student will be prepared to enter a trade or to continue on to a university or college. In Ticino, vocational students may either attend school while working on their internship or apprenticeship (which takes three or four years) or may attend school followed by an internship or apprenticeship (which takes one year as a full-time student or one and a half to two years as a part-time student). There were 105 vocational students who were attending school full-time and 157 who attend part-time.

The professional program lasts three years and prepares a student for a job in engineering, nursing, computer science, business, tourism and similar fields. There were 20 students in the professional program.

As of 2000, there were 1,096 students in Mendrisio who came from another municipality, while 155 residents attended schools outside the municipality.

Mendrisio is home to two libraries. The Academy of architecture Library of Mendrisio is one of the Università della Svizzera Italiana libraries. The library has (as of 2008) 141,291 books or other media, and loaned out 26,915 items in the same year. It was open a total of 270 days with average of 62 hours per week during that year. A palace in the old town became in 2018 the new seat of the public library, the Cantonal Library of Mendrisio which is familiarly called "Filanda" after the silk fabric once settled in the building.

From 2021 Mendrisio is home to the Department of Environment Construction and Design of the Scuola Universitaria Professionale della Svizzera Italiana (SUPSI).

== Transportation ==
The municipality has two railway stations, Mendrisio and Mendrisio San Martino. Both are located on the Gotthard line and have regular service to Milano Centrale, Malpensa Aeroporto Terminal 2, Varese, Bellinzona, Erstfeld, and Como San Giovanni. The Mendrisio San Martino station was built for its proximity to the industrial area and shopping centres.

== Notable people ==
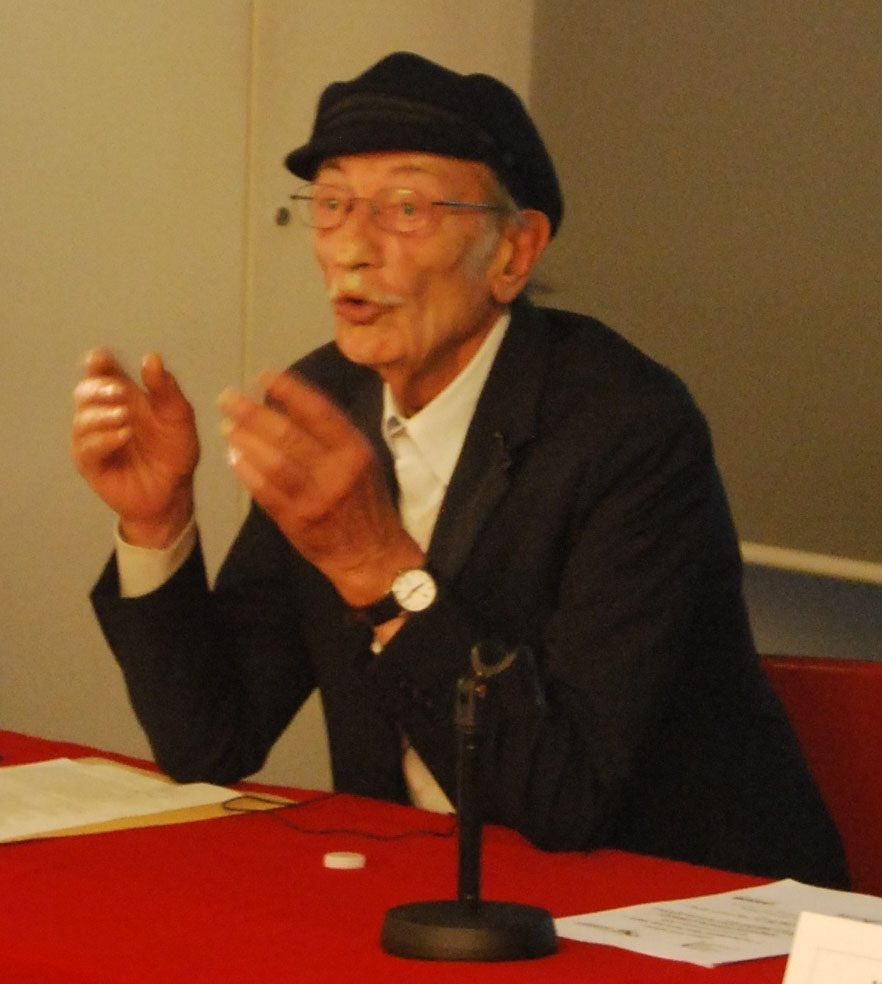
Luigi Snozzi, 2009

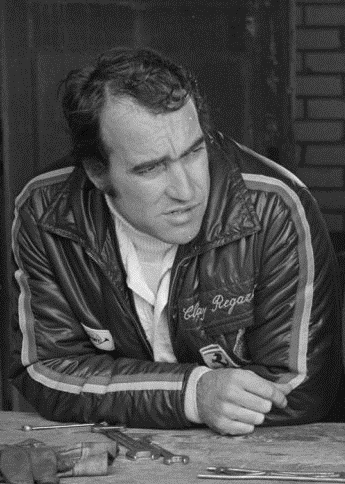
Clay Regazzoni, 1971

- Józef Fontana (1676 in Mendrisio – 1739 in Warsaw), a Swiss Italian Polish architect who settled in Poland
- Giulio Guglielmetti (1901–1987), mayor of Mendrisio, 1941 to 1973
- Luigi Snozzi (born 1932 in Mendrisio), a Swiss architect
- Bruno Monguzzi (born 1941 in Mendrisio), a Swiss graphic designer
- Peter Zumthor (born 1943), a Swiss uncompromising and minimalist architect, winner of the 2009 Pritzker Architecture Prize, professor at the Accademia di Architettura di Mendrisio
- Mario Botta (born 1943 in Mendrisio), architect, professor at the Accademia di Architettura di Mendrisio
- Fabio Pusterla (born 1957 in Mendrisio), a Swiss translator and writer in Italian
- Mauro Urbano (born 1968 in Mendrisio), writer and collector of Middle-Age and Renaissance Art
- Paolo Meneguzzi (born 1976), a Swiss Italian singer

Sport

- Clay Regazzoni (1939 in Mendrisio – 2006), a Swiss racing driver, competed in Formula One races 1970 to 1980, winning five Grands Prix
- Rocco Travella (born 1967 in Mendrisio), cyclist, competed at the 1988 and 1992 Summer Olympics
- Patrick Foletti (born 1974 in Mendrisio), former Swiss goalkeeper, now goalkeeper coach for the Switzerland national football team
- Michael Rogers (born 1979), a retired Australian professional road bicycle racer, lives in Mendrisio
- Michael Albasini (born 1980), a Swiss professional road bicycle racer
- Fulvio Sulmoni (born 1986 in Mendrisio), a Swiss footballer, 260 club caps, plays for FC Lugano
- Roberto Kovac (born 1990 in Mendrisio), a Swiss professional basketball player
- Alessandro Martinelli (born 1993 in Mendrisio), is a Swiss professional footballer, 160 club caps
