= Chiasso =

- Municipality
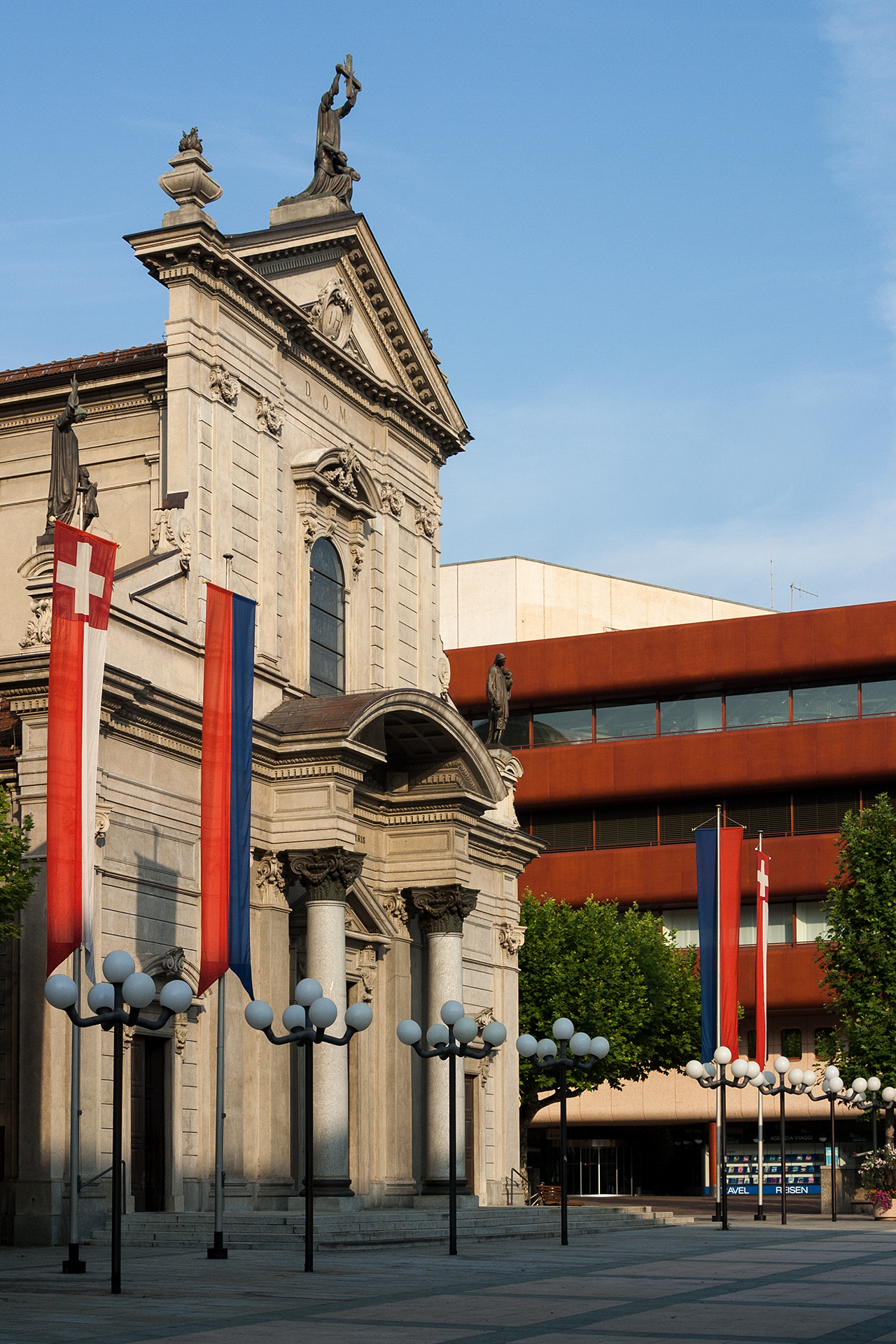

- Flag Coat of arms
- Location of Chiasso
- Location within Switzerland Location within Canton of Ticino
- Coordinates: 45°50′N 9°02′E
- Country: Switzerland
- Canton: Ticino
- District: Mendrisio

Government
  - Mayor: Bruno Arrigoni

Area
  - Total: 5.3 km^{2} (2.0 sq mi)
- Elevation: 230 m (750 ft)

Population (December 2010)
  - Total: 9,200
  - Density: 1,700/km^{2} (4,500/sq mi)
- Time zone: UTC+01:00 (CET)
  - Summer (DST): UTC+02:00 (CEST)
- Postal code: 6830
- SFOS number: 5250
- ISO 3166 code: CH-TI
- Surrounded by: Balerna, Cavallasca (IT-CO), Como (IT-CO), Colverde (IT-CO), Morbio Inferiore, Novazzano, Parè (IT-CO), Ronago (IT-CO), Vacallo
- Website: www.chiasso.ch

Chiasso (Italian pronunciation: [ˈkjasso]; Lombard: Ciass [ˈtʃas]) is a town and a municipality in the district of Mendrisio in the canton of Ticino in Switzerland.

As the southernmost of Switzerland's municipalities, Chiasso is on the border with Italy, in front of Ponte Chiasso (a frazione of Como, Italy). The municipality of Chiasso includes the villages of Boffalora, Pedrinate and Seseglio.

In 2007, the three mayors of Chiasso, Vacallo and Morbio Inferiore decided to unite into one commune. The new united commune with a population of ~15,300 people over a territory of 9.2 km^{2} (3.6 sq mi), was rejected by the population in November 2007.

== History ==
Chiasso is first mentioned in 1140 as Claso.

=== Chiasso (and Boffalora) ===
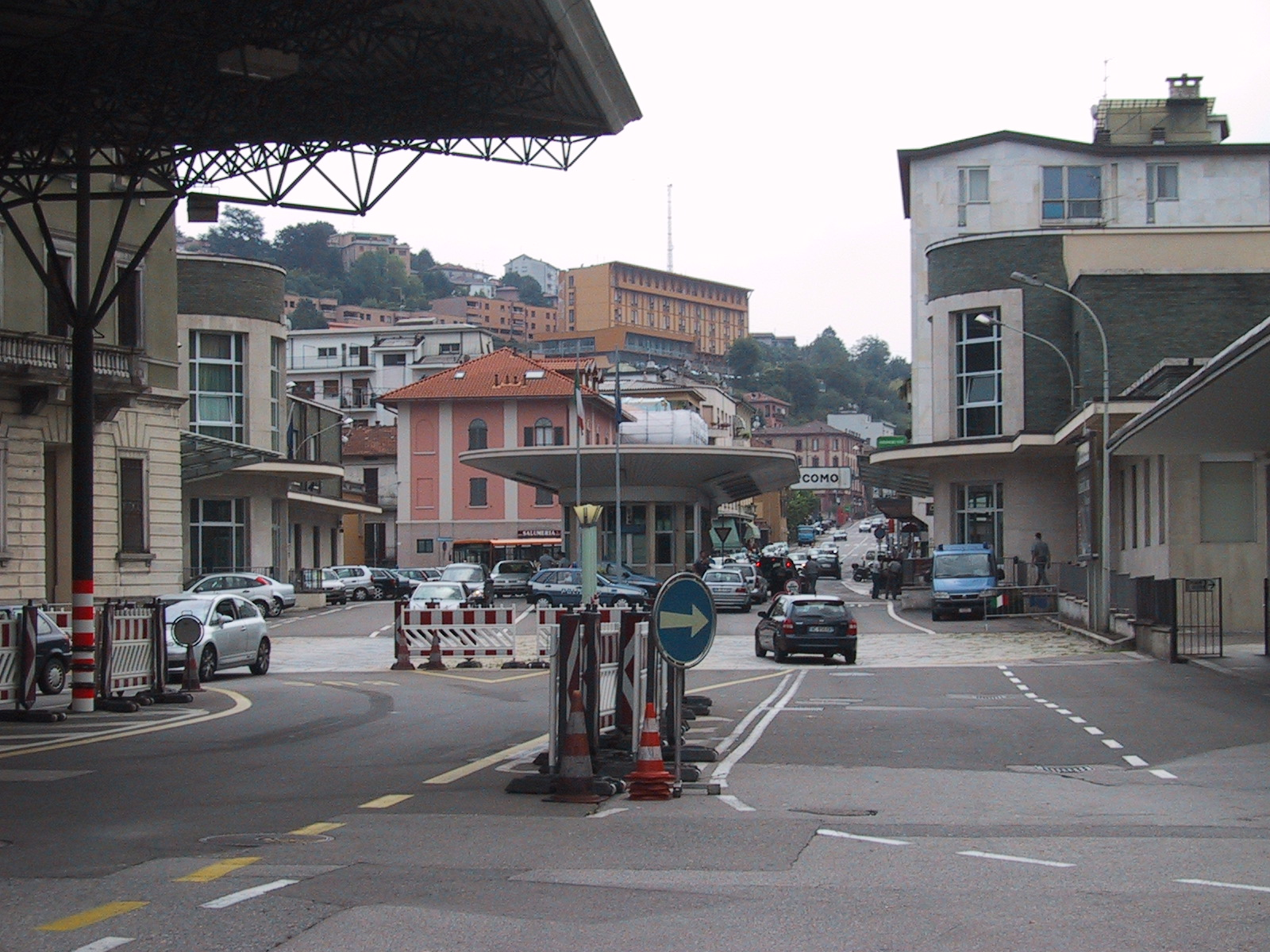
Customs at Chiasso towards Italy: Switzerland ends at the end of the foreground grey zone.

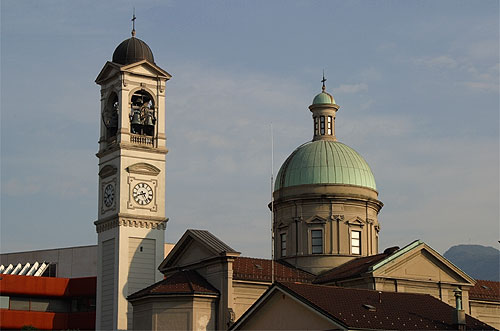
Church of San Vitale in Chiasso

Historically, Chiasso and Boffalora were two distinct agricultural villages. Due to the nearby Italian border and customs office, and later as part of an access route to the St. Gotthard's Tunnel, the two villages merged and grew.

Chiasso's history and development were strongly influenced by its unique location. In its early history, a castle was built in Chiasso as part of the extended fortifications of the city of Como. It was a suburb of Como, until 1416 when it was incorporated into the Pieve of Balerna and given to the Rusca family to manage. The houses in the village centre were owned by the Albrici family and were granted imperial privileges. Chiasso had become an independent community sometime before 1552. In the contemporary documents, it is mentioned as Clasio tabernarum (Chiasso of taverns) referring to its function as a transit point.

Boffalora is mentioned in 1536 as a municipality and kept its independence until the second half of the 17th century. They became a single parish in either 1657 or 1677.

Chiasso's church belonged to the Pieve of Zezio (in Como), from which it withdrew in the 16th century. In 1888, Boffalora separated from the parish. It became the seat of an archpriest in 1928. The Church of San Vitale, first mentioned in 1227, was rebuilt in 1934.

In the 15th century, Chiasso was known for its horse market. But the market ended after the invasion of the Swiss Confederation and the march through Chiasso in the War of the League of Cambrai in 1510. In the late 16th century, Chiasso had a smaller population than other municipalities of the Mendrisiotto valley. The village survived through its role as a border town (providing warehouses and inns) along with income from agriculture and paper mills. In the 19th century, tobacco and silk factories moved into the town.

The construction of the railway along with income from customs induced an economic and demographic recovery in Chiasso. In 1874 the railway line Lugano-Chiasso opened, followed in 1876 by one running to Como.

In 1910, the Mendrisio electric tramway opened, linking a northern terminus in Riva San Vitale with Capolago, Mendrisio, Balerna and Chiasso. The section of the line in Chiasso closed in 1950 and was replaced by a bus service.

Today, a large part of the town is devoted to Chiasso's international railway station and related customs (though some of the border-control responsibilities have been moved to Como, in Italy). There is also a sizeable customs area for traffic passing by road and motorway (both commercial and non-commercial vehicles).

Chiasso offers also a lot of customs-related services. A considerable source of revenue for the town is Italians crossing the border to buy certain goods more cheaply in Switzerland, particularly cigarettes and petrol. It is also a banking centre for Italian clients wishing to keep money within the Swiss banking system.

Starting in 1950, Chiasso became an important financial centre and the economic centre of the Mendrisio region; hence rapid population growth. Since the 1980s, however, population and jobs, especially in the service sector, have shifted into neighbouring communities.

=== The pedestrian zone ===
From 2001 to 2005, a new pedestrian zone was created, stretching from the customs area to the municipal building. An enlargement of this zone was proposed by the local administration and put to a public referendum on 24 September 2006.

=== Pedrinate ===
Pedrinate was first mentioned in 1291 as Pedrenate, but Roman ruins near the village church indicate a much longer history. It was mentioned in 1335 as part of the village cooperative of Seseglio. The village church of S. Stefano is first mentioned in 1545 and was part of the Balerna parish until the 17th century.

Pedrinate municipality was aggregated in the Chiasso municipality in 1975, along with Seseglio. It is located above Chiasso, on the Penz hill. Pedrinate is the most southern village in Switzerland.

Around Pedrinate there are some vineyards.

=== Seseglio ===
Seseglio is on the northern boundary of Chiasso municipality.

== Geography ==
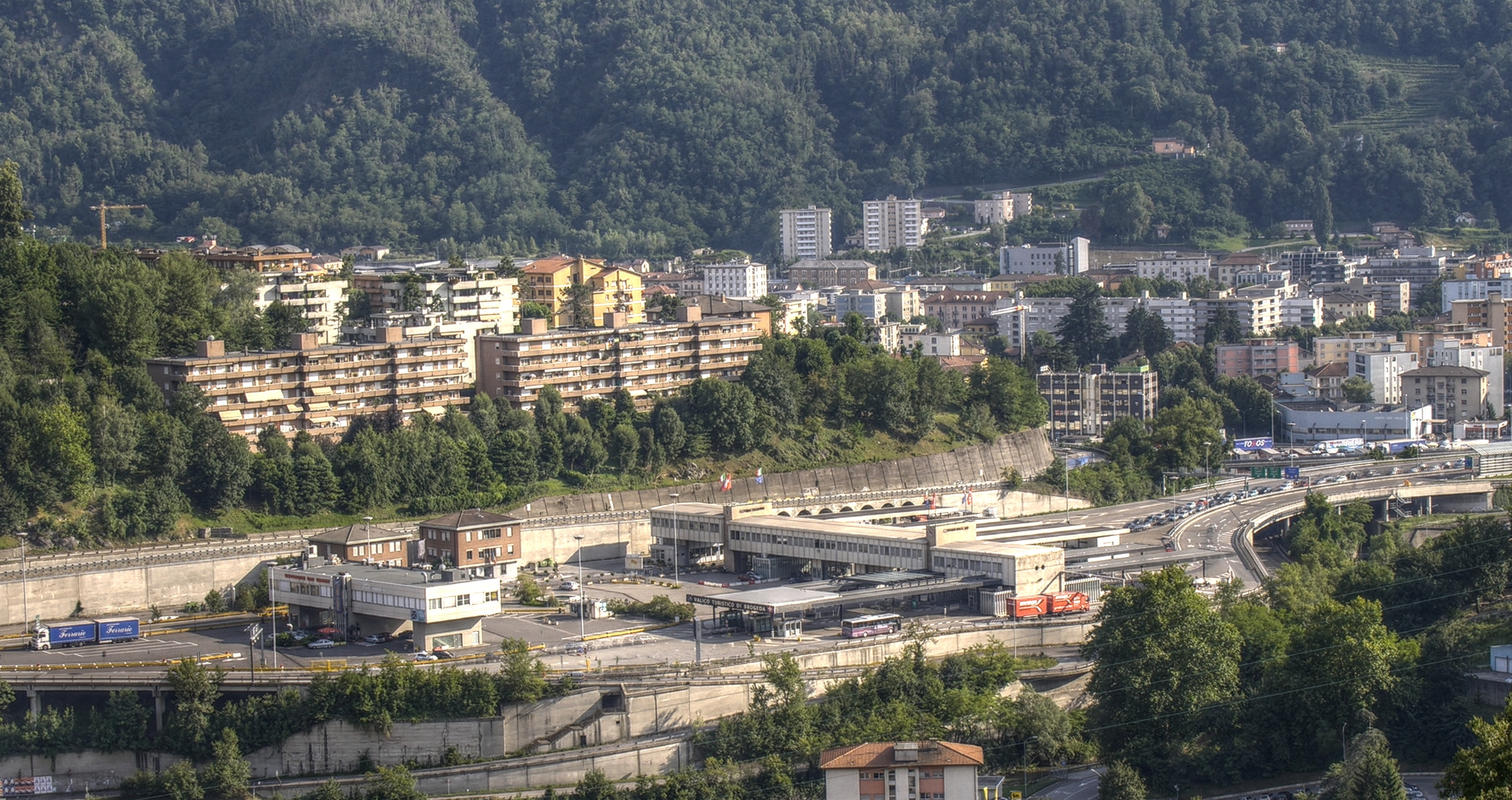
Border crossing and surrounds at Chiasso

Aerial view (1946)

Chiasso has an area, as of 1997, of 5.33 square kilometers (2.06 sq mi). Of this area, 1.63 km^{2} (0.63 sq mi) or 30.6% is used for agricultural purposes, while 2.65 km^{2} (1.02 sq mi) or 49.7% is forested. Of the rest of the land, 1.94 km^{2} (0.75 sq mi) or 36.4% is settled (buildings or roads), 0.02 km^{2} (4.9 acres) or 0.4% is either rivers or lakes and 0.04 km^{2} (9.9 acres) or 0.8% is unproductive land.

Of the built-up area, industrial buildings made up 1.7% of the total area while housing and buildings made up 18.4% and transportation infrastructure made up 14.4%. while parks, green belts and sports fields made up 1.7%. Of the forested land, 47.5% of the total land area is heavily forested and 2.3% is covered with orchards or small clusters of trees. Of the agricultural land, 7.9% is used for growing crops, 4.3% is used for orchards or vine crops, and 18.4% is used for alpine pastures. All the water in the municipality is flowing water.

The municipality is in the Mendrisio district, on the Italian border. Since Pedrinate merged into Chiasso in 1976, it has been the most southerly municipality in Switzerland.

== Coat of arms ==
The blazon of the municipal coat of arms is Argent lion passant holding a letter C gules standing on a carriage entrance azure. The carriage entrance refers to Chiasso location of the ancient road coming from Como and giving access to several places from Chiasso.

== Demographics ==
Chiasso has a population (as of December 2020) of 7,581. As of 2008, 36.4% of the population are resident foreign nationals. In 1997–2007 the population changed at a rate of −2.8%.

Most of the people (as of 2000) speak Italian (91.3%); German is second most common (2.5%) and Albanian is third (1.2%). Of the Swiss national languages (as of 2000), 196 speak German, 71 people speak French, 7,048 people speak Italian, and 4 people speak Romansh. The remainder (401 people) speak another language.

As of 2008, the gender distribution of the population was 47.0% male and 53.0% female. The population was made up of 2,226 Swiss men (28.7% of the population), and 1,420 (18.3%) non-Swiss men. There were 2,774 Swiss women (35.7%), and 1,343 (17.3%) non-Swiss women.

In 2008 there were 42 live births to Swiss citizens and 26 births to non-Swiss citizens, and in the same time span, there were 63 deaths of Swiss citizens and 27 non-Swiss citizen deaths. Ignoring immigration and emigration, the population of Swiss citizens decreased by 21 while the foreign population decreased by 1. There was 1 Swiss man who immigrated back to Switzerland and 3 Swiss women who emigrated from Switzerland. At the same time, there were 104 non-Swiss men and 94 non-Swiss women who immigrated from another country to Switzerland. The total Swiss population change in 2008 (from all sources, including moves across municipal borders) was a decrease of 47 and the non-Swiss population change was an increase of 108 people. This represents a population growth rate of 0.8%.

The age distribution, as of 2009, in Chiasso is; 567 children or 7.3% of the population are between 0 and 9 years old and 586 teenagers or 7.5% are between 10 and 19. Of the adult population, 790 people or 10.2% of the population are 20–29 years old. 1,118 people or 14.4% are between 30 and 39, 1,215 people or 15.7% are between 40 and 49, and 1,008 people or 13.0% are between 50 and 59. The senior population is 996 people or 12.8% of the population are 60–69 years old, 841 people or 10.8% are 70–79, there are 642 people or 8.3% who are over 80.

As of 2000, there were 3,774 private households in the municipality and an average of 2. persons per household. In 2000 there were 313 single-family homes (or 33.3% of the total) of a total of 940 inhabited buildings. There were 336 multi-family buildings (35.7%), along with 193 multi-purpose buildings that were mostly used for housing (20.5%) and 98 other use buildings (commercial or industrial) that also had some housing (10.4%). Of the single-family homes, 11 were built before 1919, while 38 were built between 1990 and 2000. The greatest number of single-family homes (111) were built between 1919 and 1945.

In 2000 there were 4,498 apartments in the municipality. The most common apartment size was 3 rooms of which there were 1,692. There were 316 single-room apartments and 493 apartments with five or more rooms. Of these apartments, a total of 3,763 apartments (83.7% of the total) were permanently occupied, while 181 apartments (4.0%) were seasonally occupied and 554 apartments (12.3%) were empty. The vacancy rate for the municipality, in 2008, was 3.5%. As of 2007, the construction rate of new housing units was 2.4 new units per 1000 residents.

As of 2003 the average price to rent an average apartment in Chiasso was 873.89 Swiss francs (CHF) per month (US$700, £390, €560 approx. exchange rate from 2003). The average rate for a one-room apartment was 491.07 CHF (US$390, £220, €310), a two-room apartment was about 646.96 CHF (US$520, £290, €410), a three-room apartment was about 806.94 CHF (US$650, £360, €520) and a six or more room apartment cost an average of 1544.67 CHF (US$1240, £700, €990). The average apartment price in Chiasso was 78.3% of the national average of 1116 CHF.

The historical population is given in this chart:

== Notable people ==
- Antonio Soldini (1854 in Chiasso – 1933), a Swiss-Italian sculptor
- Serge Brignoni (1903 in Chiasso – 2002), a Swiss avant-garde painter and sculptor
- Marco Grassi (born 1968 in Chiasso), a retired Swiss footballer, played 309 league games and 31 for the Switzerland national team

== Sights ==
The entire village of Chiasso is designated as part of the Inventory of Swiss Heritage Sites.

== Politics ==
In the 2007 federal election the most popular party was the FDP which got 29.77% of the vote. The next three most popular parties were the SP (20.42%), the Ticino League (18.12%) and the CVP (16.54%). In the federal election, a total of 2,050 votes were cast, and the voter turnout was 45.6%.

In the 2007 Gran Consiglio election, there were a total of 4,447 registered voters in Chiasso, of which 2,623 or 59.0% voted. 41 blank ballots and 14 null ballots were cast, leaving 2,568 valid ballots in the election. The most popular party was the PLRT which received 698 or 27.2% of the vote. The next three most popular parties were; the PS (with 486 or 18.9%), the SSI (with 456 or 17.8%) and the LEGA (with 406 or 15.8%).

In the 2007 Consiglio di Stato election, 30 blank ballots and 21 null ballots were cast, leaving 2,572 valid ballots. The most popular party was the PLRT which received 668 or 26.0% of the vote. The next three most popular parties were the PS (with 531 or 20.6%), the LEGA (with 530 or 20.6%) and the SSI (with 417 or 16.2%).

== Economy ==
As of 2007, Chiasso had an unemployment rate of 7.01%. As of 2005, there were 42 people employed in the primary economic sector and about 19 businesses involved in this sector. 880 people were employed in the secondary sector and there were 69 businesses in this sector. 5,549 people were employed in the tertiary sector, with 779 businesses in this sector. There were 3,410 residents of the municipality who were employed in some capacity, of which females made up 42.3% of the workforce.

In 2008 the total number of full-time equivalent jobs was 6,265. The number of jobs in the primary sector was 15, all of which were in agriculture. The number of jobs in the secondary sector was 931, of which 402 (43.2%) were in manufacturing and 473 (50.8%) were in construction. The number of jobs in the tertiary sector was 5,319. In the tertiary sector; 810 or 15.2% were in wholesale or retail sales or the repair of motor vehicles, 1,550 or 29.1% were in the movement and storage of goods, 208 or 3.9% were in a hotel or restaurant, 84 or 1.6% were in the information industry, 706 or 13.3% were the insurance or financial industry, 684 or 12.9% were technical professionals or scientists, 132 or 2.5% were in education and 365 or 6.9% were in health care.

In 2000, there were 6,532 workers who commuted into the municipality and 1,667 workers who commuted away. The municipality is a net importer of workers, with ~3.9 workers entering the municipality for everyone leaving. About 21.4% of the workforce coming into Chiasso are coming from outside Switzerland, while 4.0% of the locals commute out of Switzerland for work. Of the working population, 9.9% used public transportation to get to work, and 47.8% used a private car.

As of 2009, there were 4 hotels in Chiasso with a total of 128 rooms and 281 beds.

Companies based in Chiasso include Lastminute.com Group.

== Traffic ==
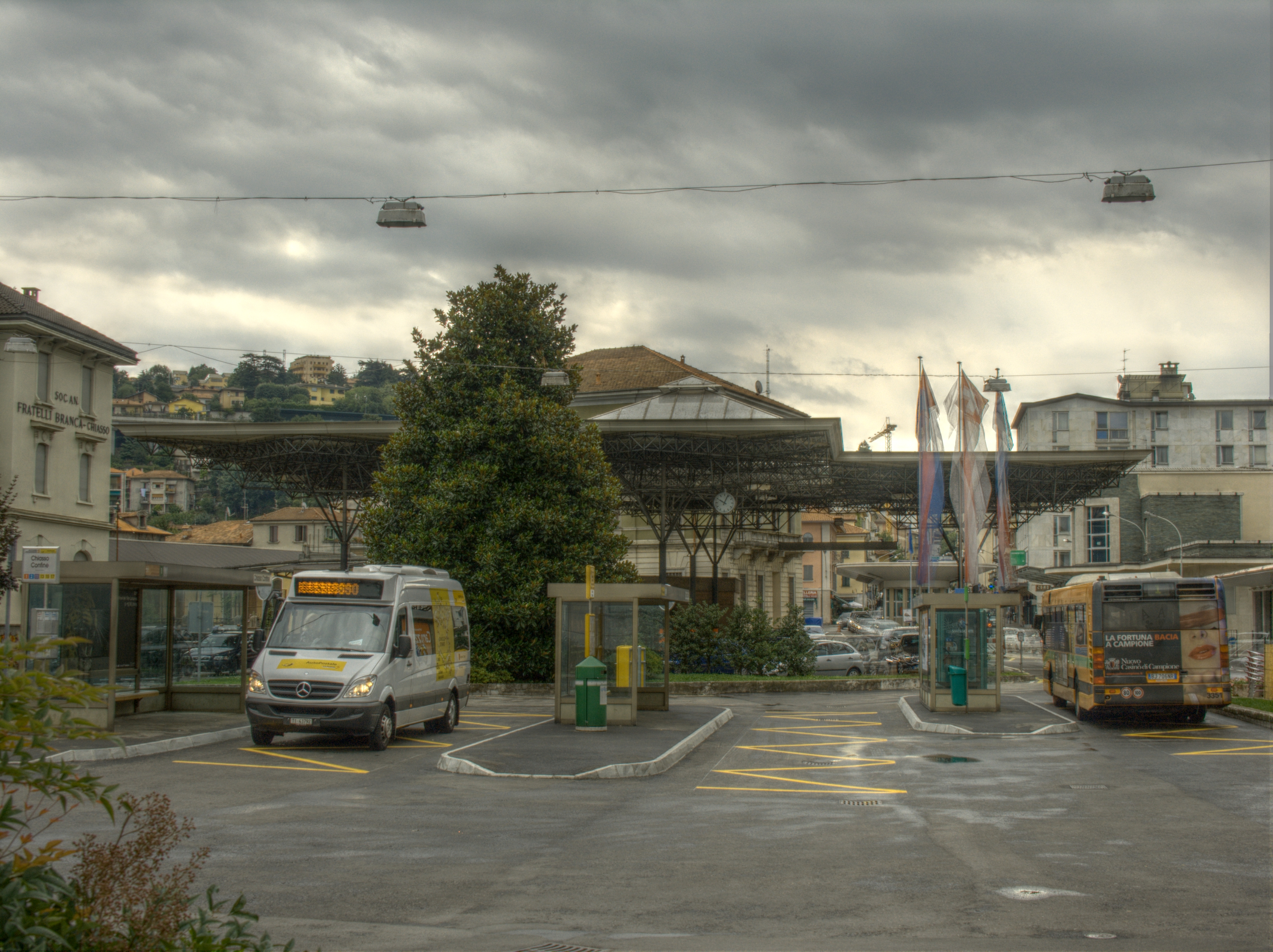
Customs station and border crossing in Chiasso

The fortune of Chiasso is mostly linked to its location on the A2; the main route to St. Gotthard's Tunnel, which connects the southern parts of the Alps and Italy with the northern part of Switzerland and Germany.

The A2 Swiss motorway begins at Chiasso. Long traffic queues often occur on the motorway around the border where vehicles are being checked for contraband.

== Religion ==
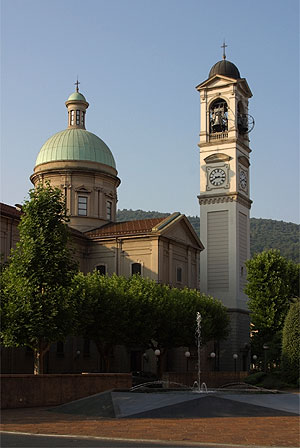
Church of San Vitale

From the 2000 census, 6,235 or 80.8% were Roman Catholic, while 230 or 3.0% belonged to the Swiss Reformed Church. There are 754 individuals (or about 9.77% of the population) who belong to another church (not listed on the census), and 501 individuals (or about 6.49% of the population) did not answer the question.

== Education ==
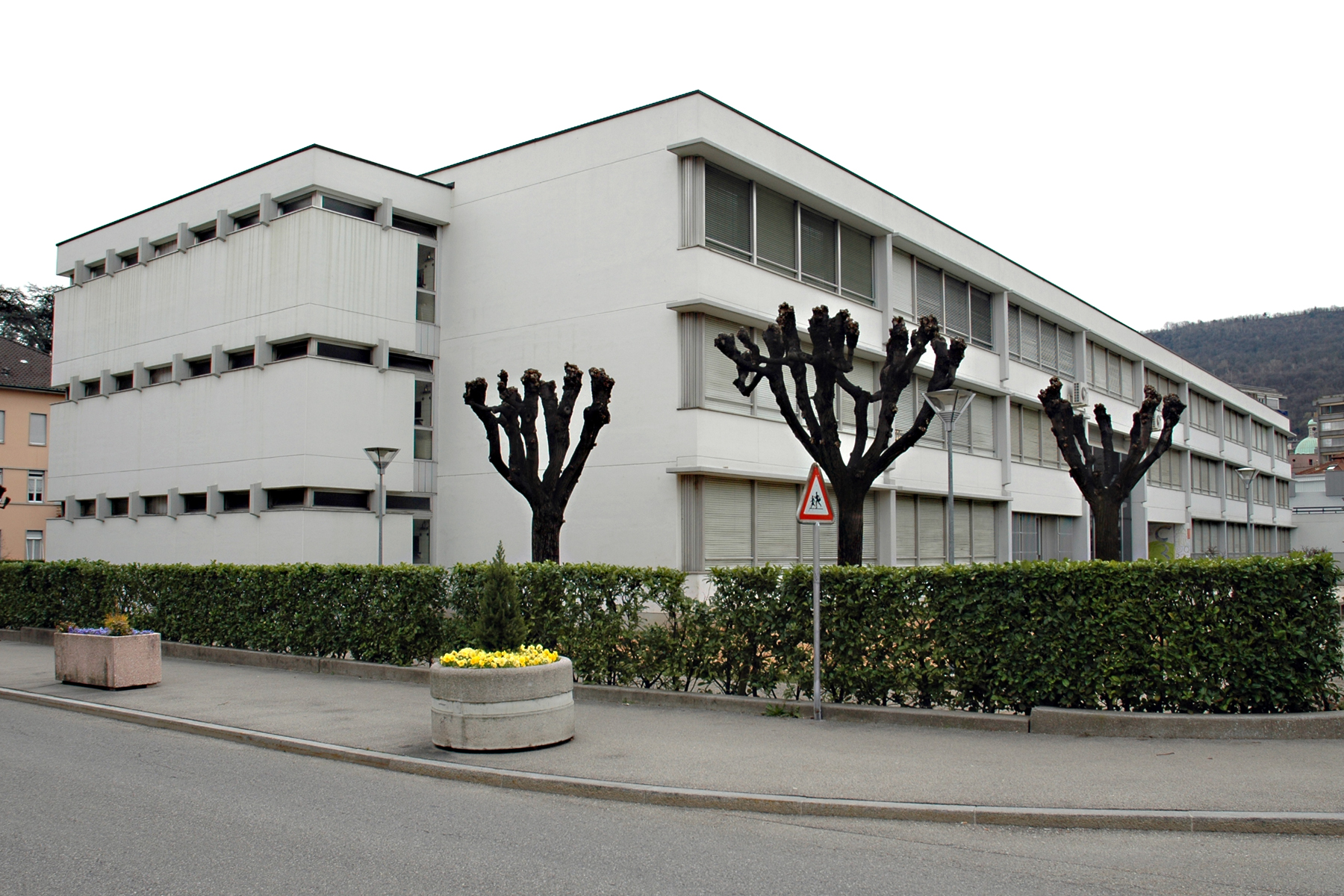
Primary School in Chiasso

The entire Swiss population is generally well educated. In Chiasso about 58.1% of the population (between age 25–64) have completed either non-mandatory upper secondary education or additional higher education (either University or a Fachhochschule).

In Chiasso there were a total of 999 students (as of 2009). The Ticino education system provides up to three years of non-mandatory kindergarten and in Chiasso there were 173 children in kindergarten. The primary school program lasts for five years and includes both a standard school and a special school. In the municipality, 300 students attended the standard primary schools and 20 students attended the special school. In the lower secondary school system, students either attend a two-year middle school followed by a two-year pre-apprenticeship or they attend a four-year program to prepare for higher education. There were 249 students in the two-year middle school and 10 in their pre-apprenticeship, while 78 students were in the four-year advanced program.

The upper secondary school includes several options, but at the end of the upper secondary program, a student will be prepared to enter a trade or to continue on to a university or college. In Ticino, vocational students may either attend school while working on their internship or apprenticeship (which takes three or four years) or may attend school followed by an internship or apprenticeship (which takes one year as a full-time student or one and a half to two years as a part-time student). There were 57 vocational students who were attending school full-time and 98 who attend part-time.

The professional program lasts three years and prepares a student for a job in engineering, nursing, computer science, business, tourism and similar fields. There were 14 students in the professional program.

As of 2000, there were 265 students in Chiasso who came from another municipality, while 318 residents attended schools outside the municipality.

== Sport ==
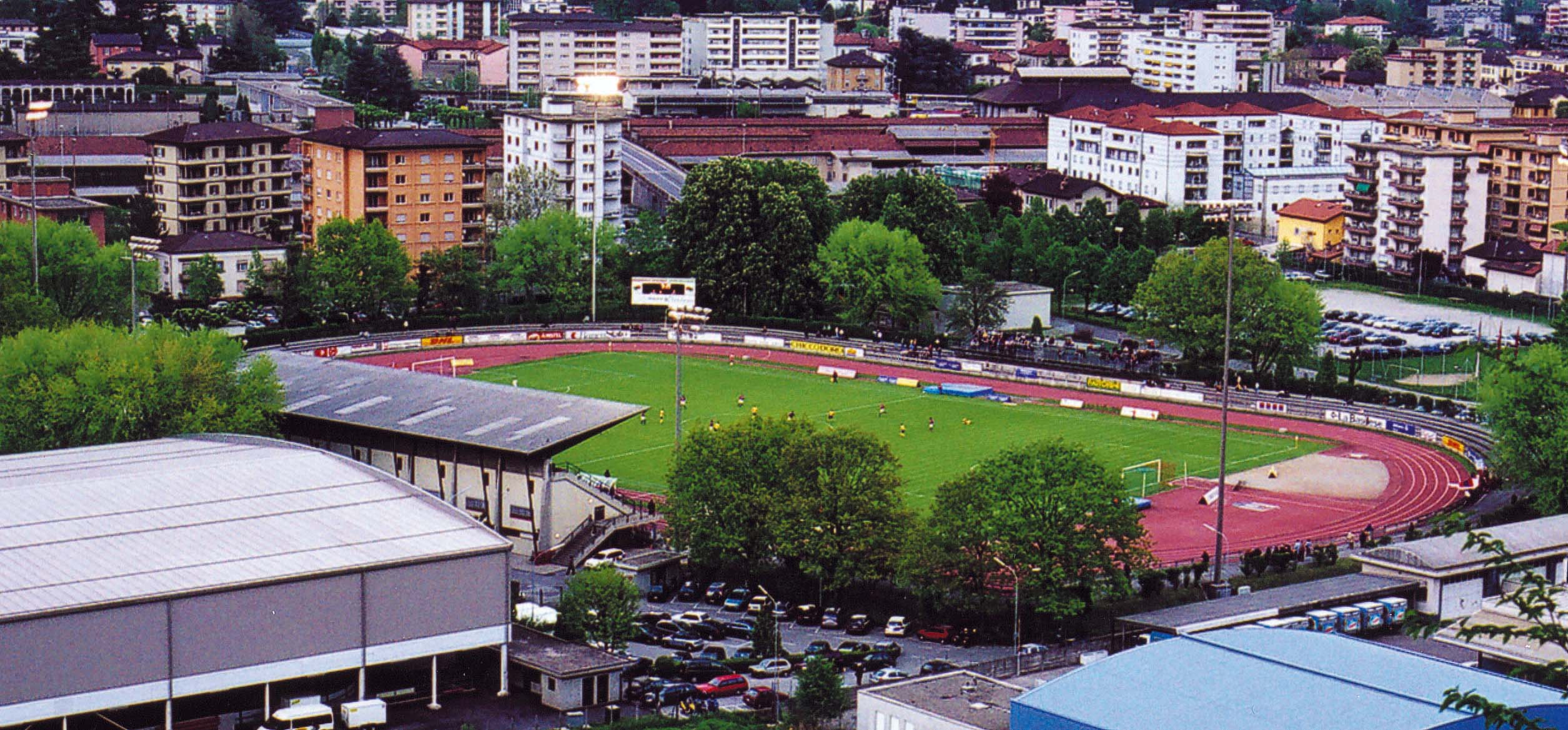
Chiasso's stadium

- Football: FC Chiasso
- Stadio comunale
- Ice hockey: HC Chiasso
- Road bicycle racing: Gran Premio di Chiasso (UCI Europe Tour)
