= Parè =

- Frazione
- Location of Parè in Italy
- Coordinates: 45°49′N 9°0′E
- Country: Italy
- Region: Lombardy
- Province: Province of Como (CO)
- Comune: Colverde

Area
  - Total: 2.2 km^{2} (0.85 sq mi)

Population (Dec. 2007)
  - Total: 1,784
  - Density: 810/km^{2} (2,100/sq mi)
- Time zone: UTC+1 (CET)
  - Summer (DST): UTC+2 (CEST)
- Postal code: 22020
- Dialing code: 031

Parè is a frazione of the comune (municipality) of Colverde in the Province of Como in the Italian region Lombardy, located about 40 kilometres (25 mi) northwest of Milan and about 6 kilometres (4 mi) west of Como, on the border with Switzerland. It was a separate comune until 2014.

== History ==
In the Napoleonic era the municipality of Parè was suppressed and united to Gironico (also municipalities of Drezzo and Montano were aggregated to it). The union lasted until 1816 when the previous municipalities were restored.

In 1928 the municipalities of Parè, Drezzo and Cavallasca were united into a single municipality called Lieto Colle (name inspired by Margherita Sarfatti, the lover of Benito Mussolini who had a palace in Cavallasca). The town hall was in Parè. After the end of Fascism, the discontent against the union grew, but only in 1956 the municipality of Lieto Colle was suppressed and the three municipalities of Parè, Drezzo and Cavallasca restored.
