= Uggiate-Trevano =

Uggiate-Trevano Uggiaa-Trevan (Lombard)
- Comune
- Comune di Uggiate-Trevano
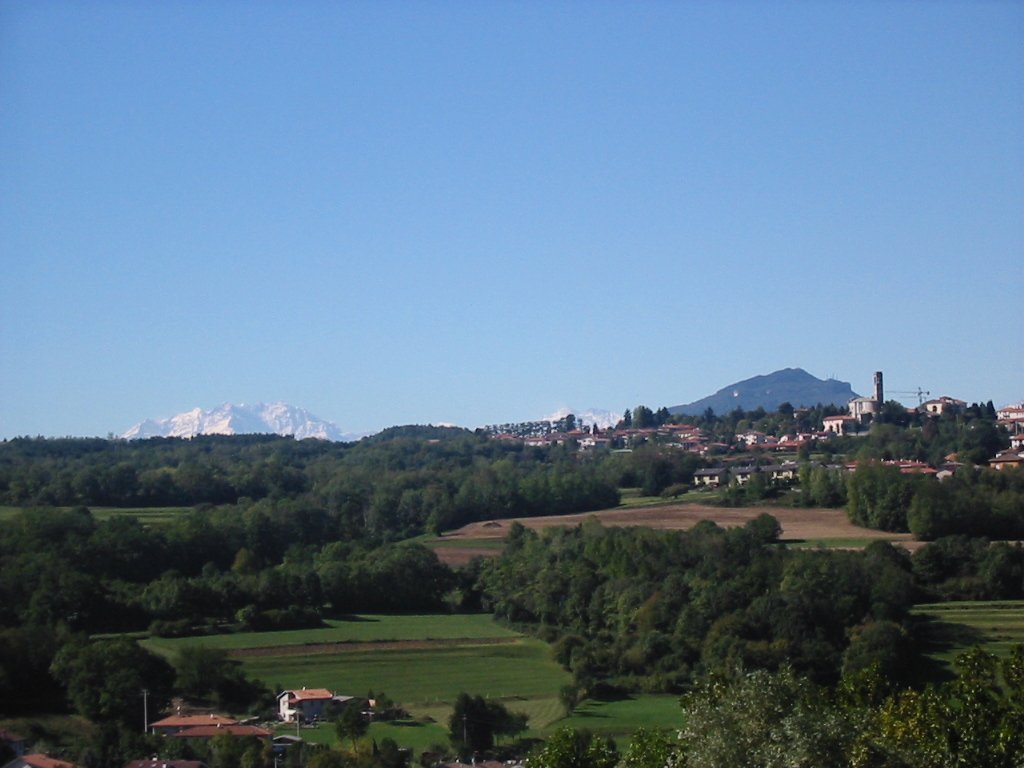

- Location within Italy Location within Lombardy
- Coordinates: 45°49′N 8°58′E
- Country: Italy
- Region: Lombardy
- Province: Como (CO)

Government
  - Mayor: Rita Lambrughi

Area
  - Total: 5.8 km^{2} (2.2 sq mi)
- Elevation: 414 m (1,358 ft)

Population (31 March 2017)
  - Total: 4,946
  - Density: 850/km^{2} (2,200/sq mi)
- Demonym: Uggiatesi
- Time zone: UTC+1 (CET)
  - Summer (DST): UTC+2 (CEST)
- Postal code: 22029
- Dialing code: 031
- Website: Official website

Uggiate-Trevano (Italian pronunciation: [udˈdʒaːte ˈtreːvano]; Comasco: Uggiaa-Trevan [yˈdʒaː ˈtreːvã]) is a former comune (municipality) in the Province of Como in the Italian region Lombardy, located about 40 kilometres (25 mi) northwest of Milan and about 9 kilometres (6 mi) west of Como, on the border with Switzerland. On 1 January 2024, it merged with Ronago to form Uggiate con Ronago.

Uggiate-Trevano bordered the following municipalities: Albiolo, Bizzarone, Colverde, Faloppio, Novazzano (Switzerland), Ronago, Valmorea.

== Twin towns ==
Uggiate-Trevano is twinned with:

- Adelsdorf, Bavaria, Germany (1998)
- Ruaudin, France (2013)
