= Balerna =

- Municipality
- Flag Coat of arms
- Location of Balerna
- Location within Switzerland Location within Canton of Ticino
- Coordinates: 45°51′N 9°00′E
- Country: Switzerland
- Canton: Ticino
- District: Mendrisio

Government
  - Mayor: Sindaco; Luca Pagani CVP/PDC/PPD (as of April 2012)

Area
  - Total: 2.57 km^{2} (0.99 sq mi)
- Elevation: 350 m (1,150 ft)

Population (2008)
  - Total: 3,478
  - Density: 1,350/km^{2} (3,510/sq mi)
- Time zone: UTC+01:00 (CET)
  - Summer (DST): UTC+02:00 (CEST)
- Postal code: 6828
- SFOS number: 5242
- ISO 3166 code: CH-TI
- Localities: Caslaccio, Mercole, S. Antonio, Bisio, Pontegana, Passeggiata
- Surrounded by: Castel San Pietro, Chiasso, Coldrerio, Morbio Inferiore, Novazzano
- Website: www.balerna.ch

Balerna is a municipality in the district of Mendrisio in the canton of Ticino in Switzerland.

== History ==
Balerna is first mentioned in 1115 as Barerna. In 844 and 865, the monastery of S. Ambrogio in Milan purchased land in the concilium of Castel S. Pietro which would have included Balerna. In the 12th century some decimani (tithe collectors) and the monastery of S. Abbondio in Como owned land and associated rights in Balerna.

By no later than the 12th century, Balerna was as the center of a pieve, which encompassed the area that is now the district of Mendrisio except for Chiasso (which was part of the pieve of Zezio) and some areas of the Pieve of Riva San Vitale. Balerna, together with Riva and Uggiate, formed a consorzio (a common property group) in the 12th century. Politically the municipalities of Chiasso, Boffalora, Pedrinate, Seseglio, Novazzano, Coldrerio, Villa, Castel San Pietro, Vacallo and the Valle di Muggio part of the Pieve of Balerna.

Starting in the 9th century Balerna belonged to the count of Seprio. In the 13th century it was under the city of Como, and later under the Bishop of Como. In 1335 under the rule of the Visconti of Milan, then under Franchino Rusca. In 1412 it came to the Duke of Milan, who completely separated it from Como in 1416. Balerna was now ruled by a Podestà, who resided in Mendrisio, but had his court in Balerna. In the following period it was owned by a large number of rulers: the Rusca family (1416–32), the Sanseverino family, the Golden Ambrosian Republic, the Schliessler family and then the Sforza family. In 1475, the Sforzas separated Balerna administratively from Mendrisio. In 1499 it passed into the hands of Count Bartolomeo Crivelli, but it was occupied in the same year by the French. In 1512 they were followed by the Swiss Confederation, who combined it with Mendrisio into a bailiwick. As part of the bailiwick, Balerna was able to retain its privileges. Until 1573 the bailiff had a court in Balerna. He had two plebani representing him at Balerna and two reggenti at Mendrisio. In 1798 it was supposed to become part of the Cisalpine Republic, but it, instead, wanted to be part of Switzerland. The decree of Aarau on 30 May 1798 combined it with Mendrisio as part of the Helvetic Republic.

In 1910, the Mendrisio electric tramway opened, linking a northern terminus in Riva San Vitale with Capolago, Mendrisio, Balerna and Chiasso. The section of the line in Balerna closed in 1950 and was replaced by a bus service.

== Geography ==
Aerial view (1946)

Balerna has an area, as of 1997, of 2.57 square kilometers (0.99 sq mi). Of this area, 1.01 km^{2} (0.39 sq mi) or 39.3% is used for agricultural purposes, while 0.16 km^{2} (0.062 sq mi) or 6.2% is forested. Of the rest of the land, 2 km^{2} (0.77 sq mi) or 77.8% is settled (buildings or roads), 0.04 km^{2} (9.9 acres) or 1.6% is either rivers or lakes and 0.03 km^{2} (7.4 acres) or 1.2% is unproductive land.

Of the built-up area, industrial buildings made up 15.2% of the total area while housing and buildings made up 25.3% and transportation infrastructure made up 30.7%. Power and water infrastructure as well as other special developed areas made up 1.9% of the area while parks, green belts and sports fields made up 4.7%. Out of the forested land, 2.3% of the total land area is heavily forested and 3.9% is covered with orchards or small clusters of trees. Of the agricultural land, 13.6% is used for growing crops and 25.3% is used for alpine pastures. All the water in the municipality is flowing water.

The municipality is located in the Mendrisio district. The municipal area, crossed by transit axes of the Gotthard line, also includes the settlements of Caslaccio, Mercole, S.Antonio, Bisio, Pontegana, Passeggiata.

== Coat of arms ==
The blazon of the municipal coat of arms is Azure a Maltese cross gules.

== Demographics ==
Balerna has a population (as of December 2020) of 3,240. As of 2008, 20.4% of the population are resident foreign nationals. Over the last 10 years (1997–2007) the population has changed at a rate of 1%.

Most of the population (as of 2000) speaks Italian (91.6%), with German being second most common (2.8%) and Portuguese being third (1.6%). Of the Swiss national languages (as of 2000), 95 speak German, 37 people speak French, 3,129 people speak Italian. The remainder (154 people) speak another language.

As of 2008, the gender distribution of the population was 48.6% male and 51.4% female. The population was made up of 1,287 Swiss men (37.6% of the population), and 375 (11.0%) non-Swiss men. There were 1,446 Swiss women (42.3%), and 313 (9.1%) non-Swiss women.

In 2008 there were 23 live births to Swiss citizens and 8 births to non-Swiss citizens, and in same time span there were 28 deaths of Swiss citizens and 7 non-Swiss citizen deaths. Ignoring immigration and emigration, the population of Swiss citizens decreased by 5 while the foreign population increased by 1. There were 2 Swiss men who immigrated back to Switzerland. At the same time, there were 26 non-Swiss men and 19 non-Swiss women who immigrated from another country to Switzerland. The total Swiss population change in 2008 (from all sources, including moves across municipal borders) was a decrease of 5 and the non-Swiss population change was an increase of 24 people. This represents a population growth rate of 0.6%.

The age distribution, as of 2009, in Balerna is; 313 children or 9.1% of the population are between 0 and 9 years old and 345 teenagers or 10.1% are between 10 and 19. Of the adult population, 342 people or 10.0% of the population are between 20 and 29 years old. 464 people or 13.6% are between 30 and 39, 542 people or 15.8% are between 40 and 49, and 409 people or 12.0% are between 50 and 59. The senior population distribution is 421 people or 12.3% of the population are between 60 and 69 years old, 359 people or 10.5% are between 70 and 79, there are 226 people or 6.6% who are over 80.

As of 2000, there were 1,519 private households in the municipality, and an average of 2.2 persons per household. In 2000 there were 265 single family homes (or 45.5% of the total) out of a total of 582 inhabited buildings. There were 119 two family buildings (20.4%) and 129 multi-family buildings (22.2%). There were also 69 buildings in the municipality that were multipurpose buildings (used for both housing and commercial or another purpose).

The vacancy rate for the municipality, in 2008, was 1.93%. In 2000 there were 1,662 apartments in the municipality. The most common apartment size was the 3-room apartment of which there were 572. There were 44 single room apartments and 295 apartments with five or more rooms. Of these apartments, a total of 1,513 apartments (91.0% of the total) were permanently occupied, while 29 apartments (1.7%) were seasonally occupied and 120 apartments (7.2%) were empty. As of 2007, the construction rate of new housing units was 1.2 new units per 1000 residents.

The historical population is given in the following chart:

== Heritage sites of national significance ==
The collegiate church complex of S. Vittore, Magazzini Generali and the ruins of the medieval castle at Pontegana are listed as Swiss heritage site of national significance.

=== Pontegana castle ===
The ruins of this medieval castle are located on small hill between Balerna and Chiasso in the village of Pontegana. The foundation of the castle includes Roman era sarcophagi as spolia. The remains of the walls still show the 15th century embrasures. Between 789 and 810, Ragifrit and Ragipert de Pontegano are mentioned as owning a nearby manor house. In the 10th or 11th centuries a castle was built as a possession of the Bishop of Como. In the ten years of war between Como and Milan it was captured in 1124 by Milan. The castle was returned after the war, and expanded in 1380. In 1508 it is mentioned as castrum de Pontegana. The remains of the building were used in the 18th century as a warehouse. Between the late 12th and the early 15th century, knights of Pontegana are mentioned in contemporary documents. The castle Chapel of S. Ilario is first mentioned in 1339, but no longer exists. Since 2007, the remains of the castle have been in the possession of the Canton Ticino.

== Politics ==
In the 2007 federal election the most popular party was the FDP which received 26.24% of the vote. The next three most popular parties were the CVP (23.48%), the SP (22.77%) and the Ticino League (14.29%). In the federal election, a total of 1,175 votes were cast, and the voter turnout was 51.6%.

In the 2007 Gran Consiglio election, there were a total of 2,331 registered voters in Balerna, of which 1,515 or 65.0% voted. 39 blank ballots and 7 null ballots were cast, leaving 1,469 valid ballots in the election. The most popular party was the PLRT which received 367 or 25.0% of the vote. The next three most popular parties were; the PS (with 319 or 21.7%), the PPD+GenGiova (with 276 or 18.8%) and the SSI (with 241 or 16.4%).

In the 2007 Consiglio di Stato election, 26 blank ballots and 8 null ballots were cast, leaving 1,480 valid ballots in the election. The most popular party was the PS which received 360 or 24.3% of the vote. The next three most popular parties were; the PLRT (with 335 or 22.6%), the PPD (with 281 or 19.0%) and the LEGA (with 239 or 16.1%).

== Economy ==
As of 2007, Balerna had an unemployment rate of 5.11%. As of 2005, there were 9 people employed in the primary economic sector and about 2 businesses involved in this sector. 795 people were employed in the secondary sector and there were 43 businesses in this sector. 1,824 people were employed in the tertiary sector, with 208 businesses in this sector. There were 1,519 residents of the municipality who were employed in some capacity, of which females made up 41.8% of the workforce.

In 2000, there were 3,283 workers who commuted into the municipality and 1,057 workers who commuted away. The municipality is a net importer of workers, with about 3.1 workers entering the municipality for every one leaving. About 32.3% of the workforce coming into Balerna are coming from outside Switzerland, while 1.4% of the locals commute out of Switzerland for work. Of the working population, 9.9% used public transportation to get to work, and 61.6% used a private car.

As of 2009, there were 3 hotels in Balerna.

== Religion ==
From the 2000 census, 2,926 or 85.7% were Roman Catholic, while 120 or 3.5% belonged to the Swiss Reformed Church. There are 257 individuals (or about 7.53% of the population) who belong to another church (not listed on the census), and 112 individuals (or about 3.28% of the population) did not answer the question.

== Education ==
In Balerna about 64.2% of the population (between age 25 and 64) have completed either non-mandatory upper secondary education or additional higher education (either university or a Fachhochschule).

In Balerna there were a total of 563 students (as of 2009). The Ticino education system provides up to three years of non-mandatory kindergarten and in Balerna there were 97 children in kindergarten. The primary school program lasts for five years and includes both a standard school and a special school. In the municipality, 156 students attended the standard primary schools and 8 students attended the special school. In the lower secondary school system, students either attend a two-year middle school followed by a two-year pre-apprenticeship or they attend a four-year program to prepare for higher education. There were 141 students in the two-year middle school, while 60 students were in the four-year advanced program.

The upper secondary school includes several options, but at the end of the upper secondary program, a student will be prepared to enter a trade or to continue on to a university or college. In Ticino, vocational students may either attend school while working on their internship or apprenticeship (which takes three or four years) or may attend school followed by an internship or apprenticeship (which takes one year as a full-time student or one and a half to two years as a part-time student). There were 37 vocational students who were attending school full-time and 57 who attend part-time.

The professional program lasts three years and prepares a student for a job in engineering, nursing, computer science, business, tourism and similar fields. There were 7 students in the professional program.

As of 2000, there were 201 students in Balerna who came from another municipality, while 149 residents attended schools outside the municipality.

== Transport ==
Balerna is served by the Balerna station, which is on the Gotthard railway.
