= Uggiate con Ronago =

Comune in Italy

- Comune
- Comune di Uggiate con Ronago
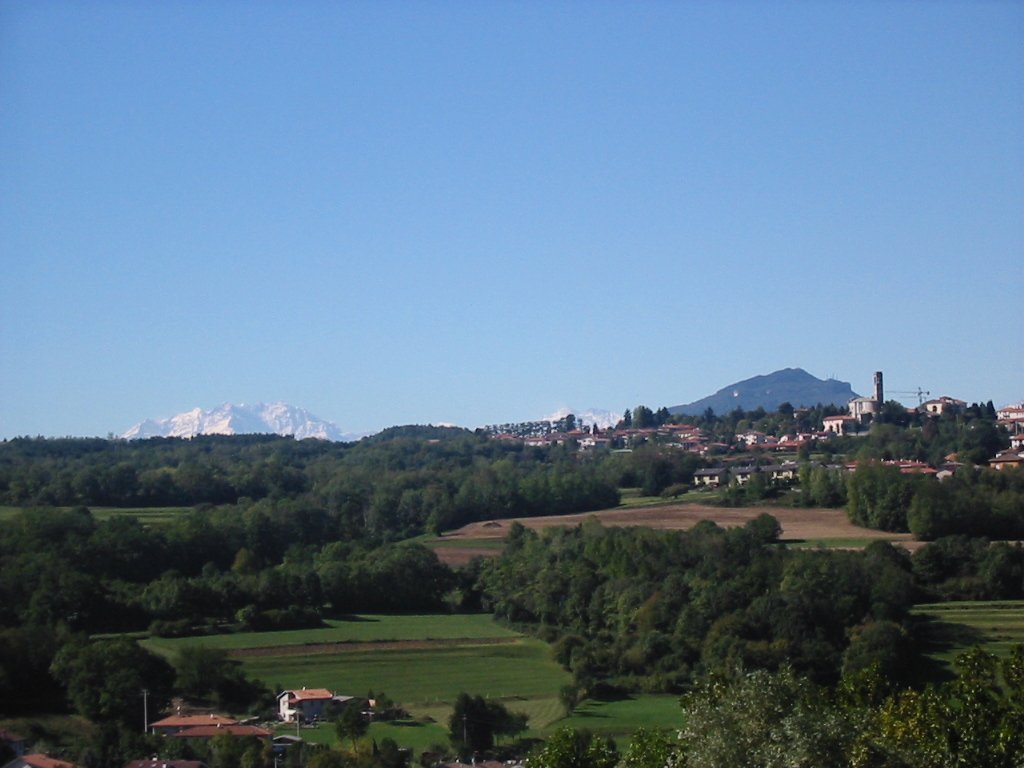

- Location within Italy Location within Lombardy
- Coordinates: 45°49′23.12″N 8°57′37.76″E
- Country: Italy
- Region: Lombardy
- Province: Como (CO)

Area
  - Total: 7.87 km^{2} (3.04 sq mi)

Population (2020)
  - Total: 6,560
  - Density: 834/km^{2} (2,160/sq mi)
- Time zone: UTC+1 (CET)
  - Summer (DST): UTC+2 (CEST)

Uggiate con Ronago is a comune (municipality) in the Province of Como in the Italian region Lombardy. The municipality of established on 1 January 2024 with the merger of Uggiate-Trevano and Ronago.

== History ==
On 10 September 2023, a popular consultative referendum expressed itself in favor of the merger between Ronago and Uggiate-Trevano, choosing "Uggiate con Ronago" as the name of the new municipality.
