= Vacallo =

- Municipality
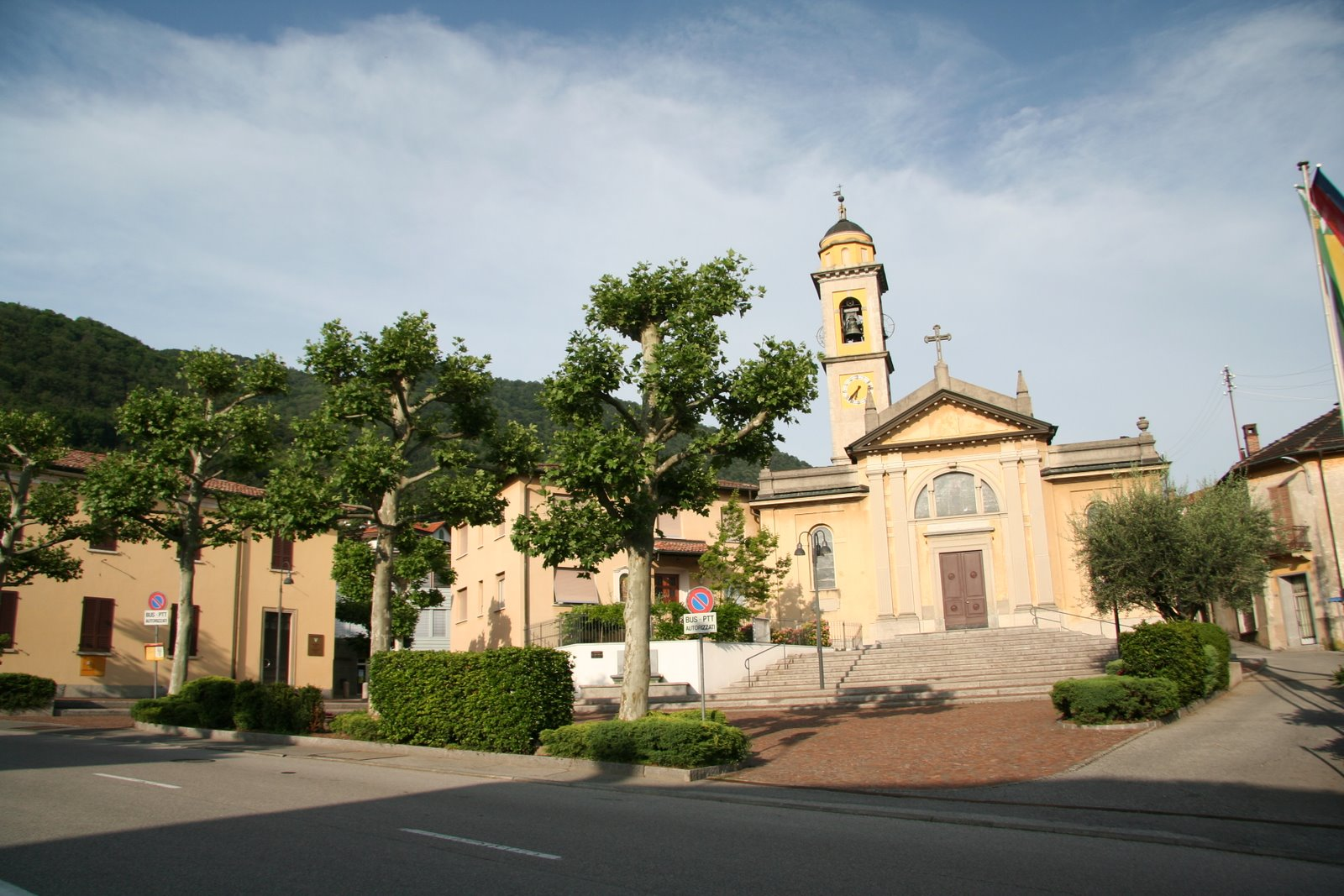

- Flag Coat of arms
- Location of Vacallo
- Location within Switzerland Location within Canton of Ticino
- Coordinates: 45°51′N 9°02′E
- Country: Switzerland
- Canton: Ticino
- District: Mendrisio

Government
  - Mayor: sindaco Marco Rizza Per Vacallo PPD Indipendenti Giovani (as of 2012)

Area
  - Total: 1.61 km^{2} (0.62 sq mi)
- Elevation: 367 m (1,204 ft)

Population (December 2004)
  - Total: 2,889
  - Density: 1,790/km^{2} (4,650/sq mi)
- Time zone: UTC+01:00 (CET)
  - Summer (DST): UTC+02:00 (CEST)
- Postal code: 6833
- SFOS number: 5268
- ISO 3166 code: CH-TI
- Surrounded by: Cernobbio (IT-CO), Chiasso, Como (IT-CO), Maslianico (IT-CO), Morbio Inferiore, Sagno
- Website: vacallo.ch

Vacallo is a municipality in the district of Mendrisio in the canton of Ticino in Switzerland. It is the first (or last) village of the Valle di Muggio.

== History ==
Like nearby Chiasso, Vacallo was formerly a suburb of Como, until, along with the rest of Ticino it was then annexed from Italian cities in the 15th century by various Swiss forces in the last transalpine campaigns of the Old Swiss Confederacy. More precisely it was 1416 when it was incorporated in the Pieve of Balerna and given to the Rusca family to manage. In the Helvetic Republic, established 1798, it formed part of the canton of Lugano. The creation of the Swiss Confederation in 1803 saw a merger with neighbouring canton of Bellinzona to form the modern canton of Ticino.

Due to its proximity with the Italian border, Vacallo had visitors in exile from nearby Italy like Puccini. However, it was a tense place to be during World War II but since then has turned into a sleepy suburb of Chiasso.

In 2007, the three mayors of Chiasso, Vacallo and Morbio Inferiore decided to unite into one commune. In return for losing independence, the commune would have gained access to more services, such as retirement homes in the surrounding areas. The new united commune which would have had a population of approximately 15,300 people over a territory of 9.2 km^{2} (3.6 sq mi), was voted against by the population in November 2007.

== Geography ==
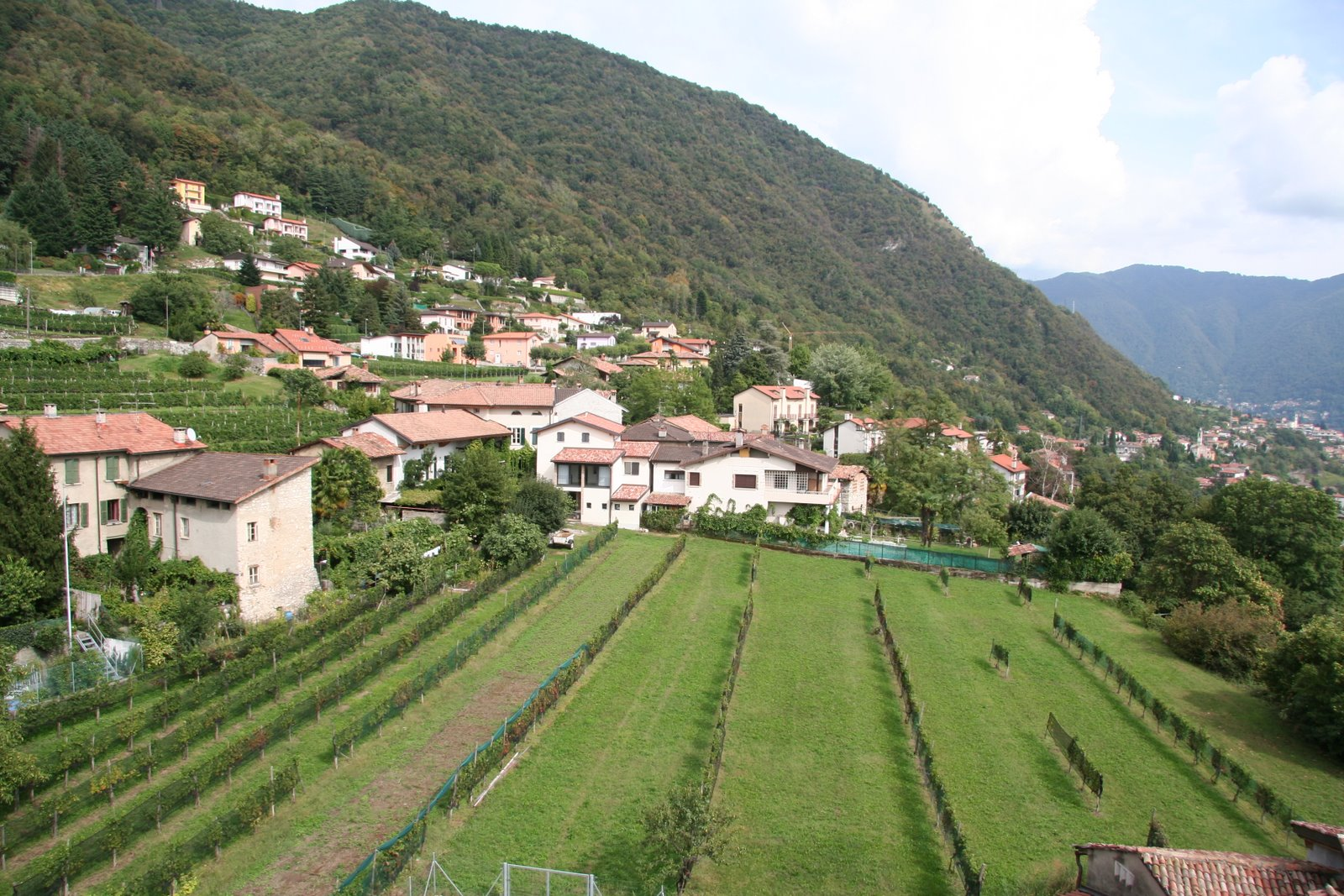
Vacallo and surrounding fields

Vacallo has an area, as of 1997, of 1.61 square kilometers (0.62 sq mi). Of this area, 0.73 km^{2} (0.28 sq mi) or 45.3% is used for agricultural purposes, while 0.6 km^{2} (0.23 sq mi) or 37.3% is forested. Of the rest of the land, 0.73 km^{2} (0.28 sq mi) or 45.3% is settled (buildings or roads), 0.03 km^{2} (7.4 acres) or 1.9% is either rivers or lakes and 0.04 km^{2} (9.9 acres) or 2.5% is unproductive land.

Of the built up area, housing and buildings made up 31.7% and transportation infrastructure made up 9.9%. while parks, green belts and sports fields made up 3.1%. Out of the forested land, 32.9% of the total land area is heavily forested and 4.3% is covered with orchards or small clusters of trees. Of the agricultural land, 8.7% is used for growing crops, while 5.0% is used for orchards or vine crops and 31.7% is used for alpine pastures. All the water in the municipality is flowing water.

== Coat of arms ==
The blazon of the municipal coat of arms is Gules an inverted chevron throughout argent between three bunches of grapes or.

Each bunch of grapes symbolises the three parishes or 'frazione' of the commune, including San Simone and Roggiana and Pizzamiglio.

== Demographics ==
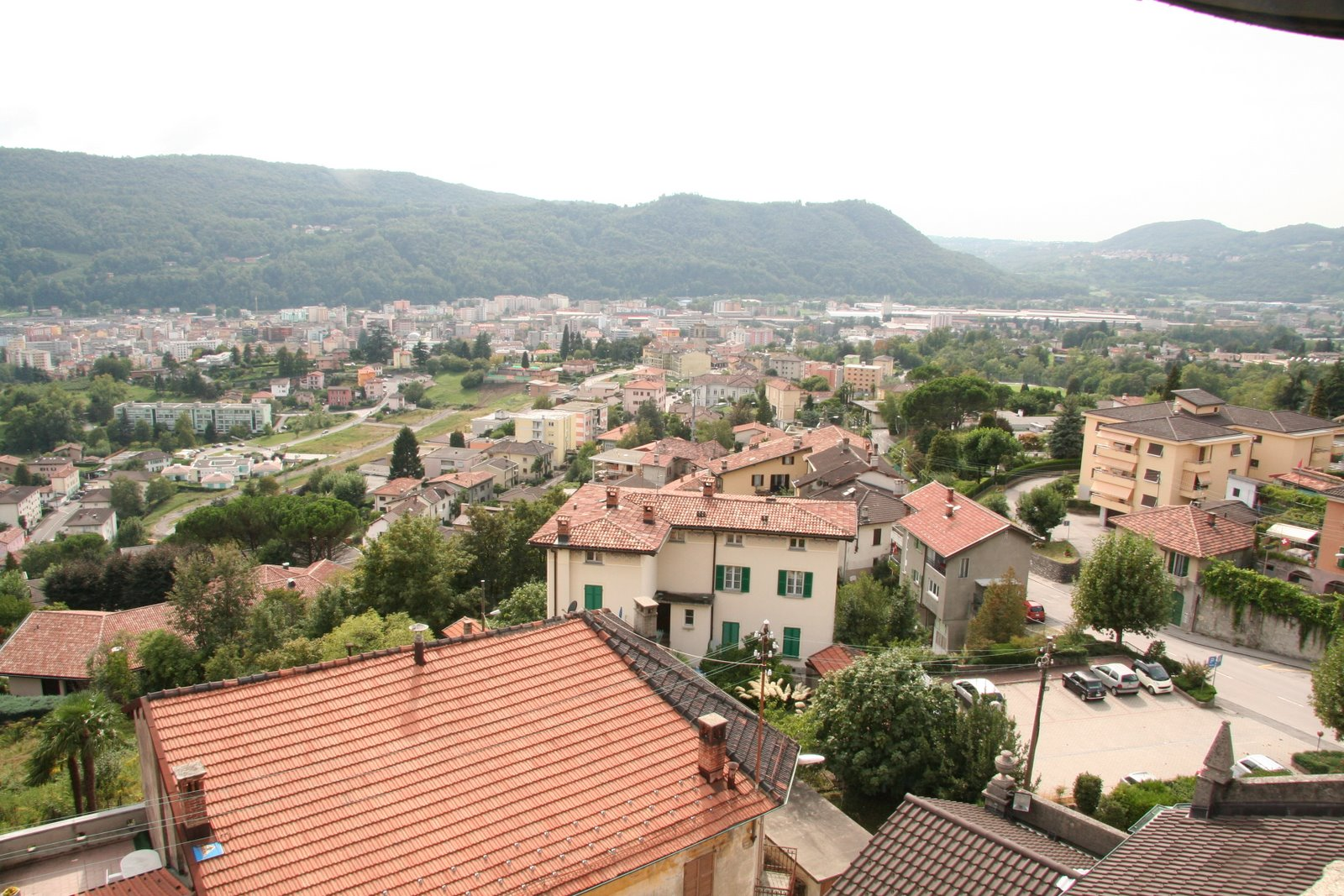
Vacallo

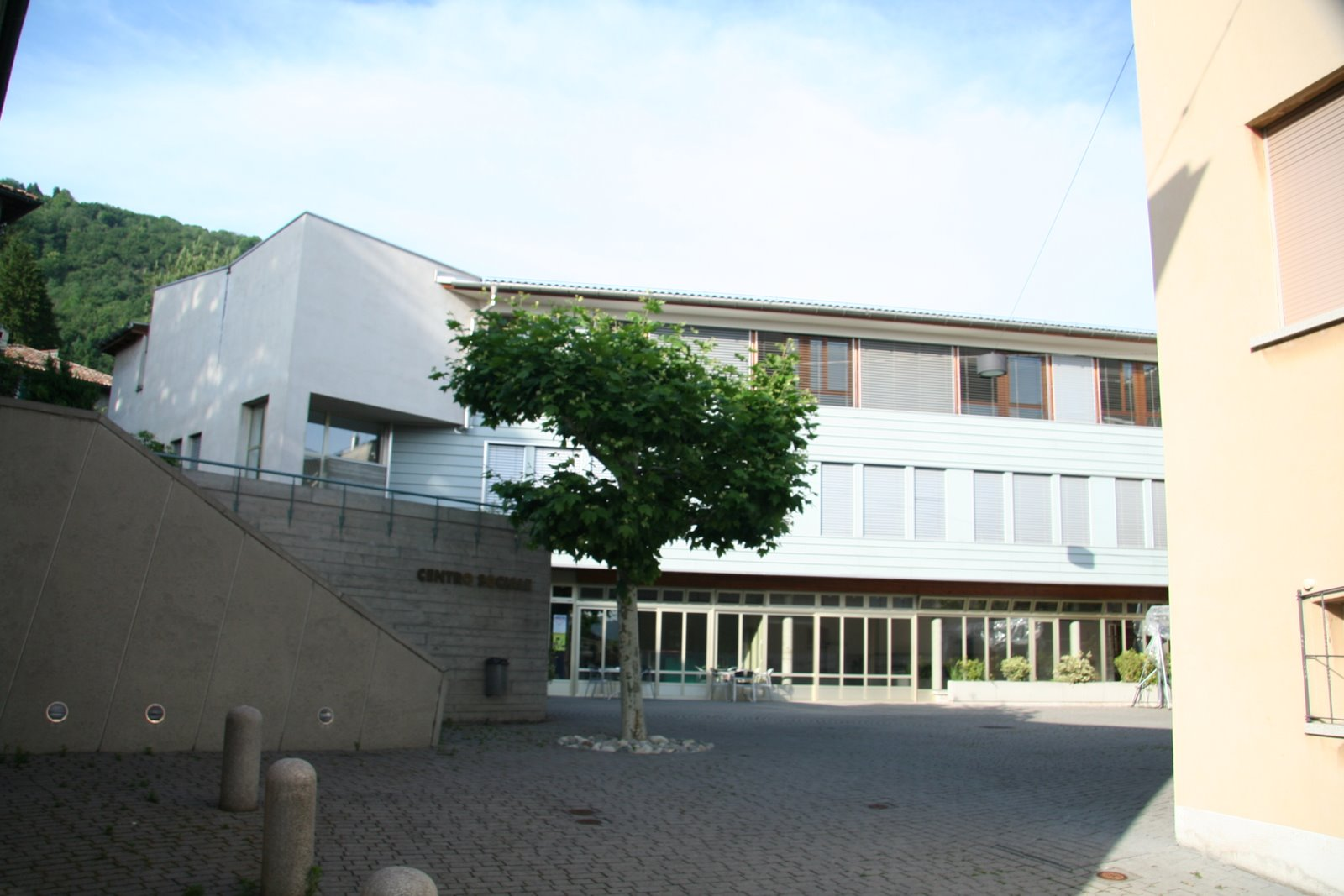
Community Center in Vacallo

Vacallo has a population (as of December 2020) of 3,363. As of 2008, 23.2% of the population are resident foreign nationals. Over the last 10 years (1997–2007) the population has changed at a rate of 0.2%. Most of the population (as of 2000) speaks Italian language (2,564 or 93.0%), with German being second most common (113 or 4.1%) and French being third (42 or 1.5%). There is 1 person who speaks Romansh.

As of 2008, the gender distribution of the population was 47.8% male and 52.2% female. The population was made up of 1,078 Swiss men (35.9% of the population), and 359 (12.0%) non-Swiss men. There were 1,246 Swiss women (41.5%), and 321 (10.7%) non-Swiss women. Of the population in the municipality 754 or about 27.3% were born in Vacallo and lived there in 2000. There were 846 or 30.7% who were born in the same canton, while 256 or 9.3% were born somewhere else in Switzerland, and 882 or 32.0% were born outside of Switzerland.

In 2008 there were 20 live births to Swiss citizens and 7 births to non-Swiss citizens, and in same time span there were 15 deaths of Swiss citizens and 3 non-Swiss citizen deaths. Ignoring immigration and emigration, the population of Swiss citizens increased by 5 while the foreign population increased by 4. There were 3 Swiss women who immigrated back to Switzerland. At the same time, there were 30 non-Swiss men and 14 non-Swiss women who immigrated from another country to Switzerland. The total Swiss population change in 2008 (from all sources, including moves across municipal borders) was an increase of 36 and the non-Swiss population change was an increase of 34 people. This represents a population growth rate of 2.4%.

The age distribution, as of 2009, in Vacallo is; 252 children or 8.4% of the population are between 0 and 9 years old and 306 teenagers or 10.2% are between 10 and 19. Of the adult population, 272 people or 9.1% of the population are between 20 and 29 years old. 411 people or 13.7% are between 30 and 39, 526 people or 17.5% are between 40 and 49, and 380 people or 12.6% are between 50 and 59. The senior population distribution is 412 people or 13.7% of the population are between 60 and 69 years old, 282 people or 9.4% are between 70 and 79, there are 163 people or 5.4% who are over 80.

As of 2000, there were 1,024 people who were single and never married in the municipality. There were 1,476 married individuals, 165 widows or widowers and 93 individuals who are divorced.

As of 2000, there were 1,169 private households in the municipality, and an average of 2.3 persons per household. There were 326 households that consist of only one person and 60 households with five or more people. Out of a total of 1,172 households that answered this question, 27.8% were households made up of just one person and 27 were adults who lived with their parents. Of the rest of the households, there are 319 married couples without children, 400 married couples with children There were 78 single parents with a child or children. There were 19 households that were made up of unrelated people and 3 households that were made of some sort of institution or another collective housing.

In 2000 there were 338 single family homes (or 60.6% of the total) out of a total of 558 inhabited buildings. There were 185 multi-family buildings (33.2%), along with 19 multi-purpose buildings that were mostly used for housing (3.4%) and 16 other use buildings (commercial or industrial) that also had some housing (2.9%). Of the single family homes 10 were built before 1919, while 45 were built between 1990 and 2000. The greatest number of single family homes (105) were built between 1946 and 1960.

In 2000 there were 1,416 apartments in the municipality. The most common apartment size was 4 rooms of which there were 469. There were 37 single room apartments and 337 apartments with five or more rooms. Of these apartments, a total of 1,164 apartments (82.2% of the total) were permanently occupied, while 30 apartments (2.1%) were seasonally occupied and 222 apartments (15.7%) were empty. As of 2007, the construction rate of new housing units was 1.7 new units per 1000 residents. The vacancy rate for the municipality, in 2008, was 2.77%.

The historical population is given in the following chart:

== Sights ==
A plaque commemorates the fact that Giacomo Puccini stayed in Vacallo between 1889 and 1892 and composed the second act of Manon Lescaut here. Other visitors include Ruggero Leoncavallo. Vacallo is also known for its basketball team, which has won multiple national titles.

== Politics ==
In the 2007 federal election the most popular party was the CVP which received 25.74% of the vote. The next three most popular parties were the FDP (24.87%), the SP (18.62%) and the Ticino League (18.02%). In the federal election, a total of 996 votes were cast, and the voter turnout was 52.3%.

In the 2007 Gran Consiglio election, there were a total of 1,986 registered voters in Vacallo, of which 1,283 or 64.6% voted. 19 blank ballots and 3 null ballots were cast, leaving 1,261 valid ballots in the election. The most popular party was the PPD+GenGiova which received 292 or 23.2% of the vote. The next three most popular parties were; the PLRT (with 272 or 21.6%), the PS (with 216 or 17.1%) and the SSI (with 204 or 16.2%).

In the 2007 Consiglio di Stato election, 18 blank ballots and 7 null ballots were cast, leaving 1,258 valid ballots in the election. The most popular party was the LEGA which received 279 or 22.2% of the vote. The next three most popular parties were; the LEGA (with 279 or 22.2%), the PLRT (with 251 or 20.0%) and the PS (with 228 or 18.1%).

== Economy ==
As of 2007, Vacallo had an unemployment rate of 4.3%. As of 2005, there were people employed in the primary economic sector and about businesses involved in this sector. 68 people were employed in the secondary sector and there were 11 businesses in this sector. 201 people were employed in the tertiary sector, with 51 businesses in this sector. There were 1,267 residents of the municipality who were employed in some capacity, of which females made up 40.1% of the workforce.

In 2008 the total number of full-time equivalent jobs was 290. The number of jobs in the primary sector was, all of which were in agriculture. The number of jobs in the secondary sector was 87, of which 34 or (39.1%) were in manufacturing and 39 (44.8%) were in construction. The number of jobs in the tertiary sector was 203. In the tertiary sector; 54 or 26.6% were in wholesale or retail sales or the repair of motor vehicles, 12 or 5.9% were in the movement and storage of goods, 19 or 9.4% were in a hotel or restaurant, 6 or 3.0% were the insurance or financial industry, 6 or 3.0% were technical professionals or scientists, 18 or 8.9% were in education and 11 or 5.4% were in health care.

In 2000, there were 321 workers who commuted into the municipality and 1,066 workers who commuted away. The municipality is a net exporter of workers, with about 3.3 workers leaving the municipality for every one entering. About 32.7% of the workforce coming into Vacallo are coming from outside Switzerland, while 1.2% of the locals commute out of Switzerland for work. Of the working population, 6.9% used public transportation to get to work, and 70.8% used a private car.

As of 2009, there was one hotel in Vacallo.

== Religion ==
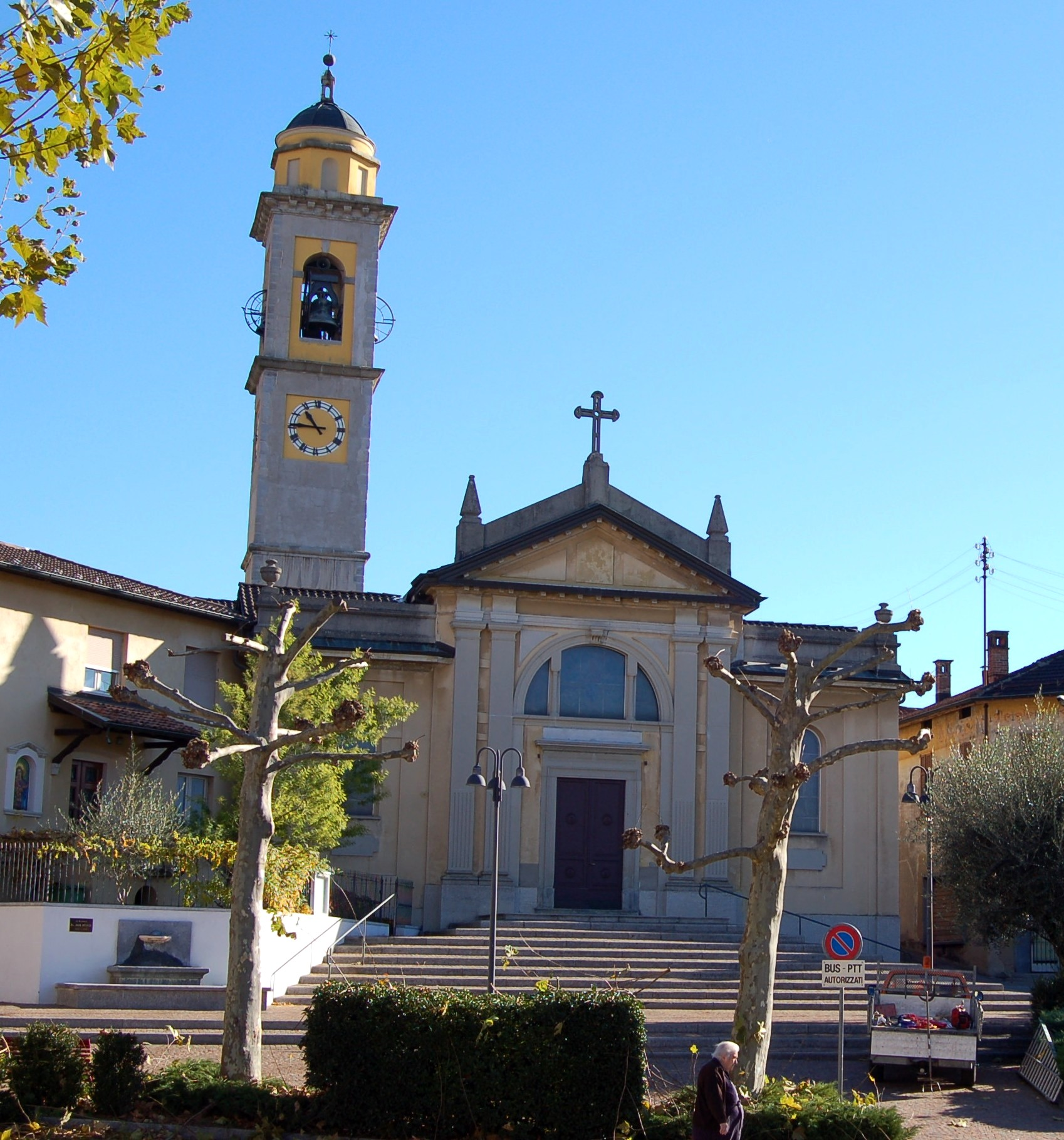
Church of S. Croce in Vacallo

From the 2000 census, 2,400 or 87.0% were Roman Catholic, while 100 or 3.6% belonged to the Swiss Reformed Church. Of the rest of the population, there were 8 members of an Orthodox church (or about 0.29% of the population), there were 5 individuals (or about 0.18% of the population) who belonged to the Christian Catholic Church, and there were 29 individuals (or about 1.05% of the population) who belonged to another Christian church. There was 1 individual who was Jewish, and 14 (or about 0.51% of the population) who were Islamic. There were 2 individuals who were Buddhist. 139 (or about 5.04% of the population) belonged to no church, are agnostic or atheist, and 60 individuals (or about 2.18% of the population) did not answer the question.

== Education ==
In Vacallo about 1,169 or (42.4%) of the population have completed non-mandatory upper secondary education, and 355 or (12.9%) have completed additional higher education (either university or a Fachhochschule). Of the 355 who completed tertiary schooling, 47.9% were Swiss men, 28.5% were Swiss women, 17.7% were non-Swiss men and 5.9% were non-Swiss women.

In Vacallo there were a total of 463 students (as of 2009). The Ticino education system provides up to three years of non-mandatory kindergarten and in Vacallo there were 84 children in kindergarten. The primary school program lasts for five years and includes both a standard school and a special school. In the municipality, 134 students attended the standard primary schools and 4 students attended the special school. In the lower secondary school system, students either attend a two-year middle school followed by a two-year pre-apprenticeship or they attend a four-year program to prepare for higher education. There were 118 students in the two-year middle school, while 54 students were in the four-year advanced program.

The upper secondary school includes several options, but at the end of the upper secondary program, a student will be prepared to enter a trade or to continue on to a university or college. In Ticino, vocational students may either attend school while working on their internship or apprenticeship (which takes three or four years) or may attend school followed by an internship or apprenticeship (which takes one year as a full-time student or one and a half to two years as a part-time student). There were 29 vocational students who were attending school full-time and 37 who attend part-time.

The professional program lasts three years and prepares a student for a job in engineering, nursing, computer science, business, tourism and similar fields. There were 3 students in the professional program.

As of 2000, there were 29 students in Vacallo who came from another municipality, while 239 residents attended schools outside the municipality.

== Sports ==
SAV Vacallo Basket in based in Vacallo.
