= Novazzano =

- Municipality
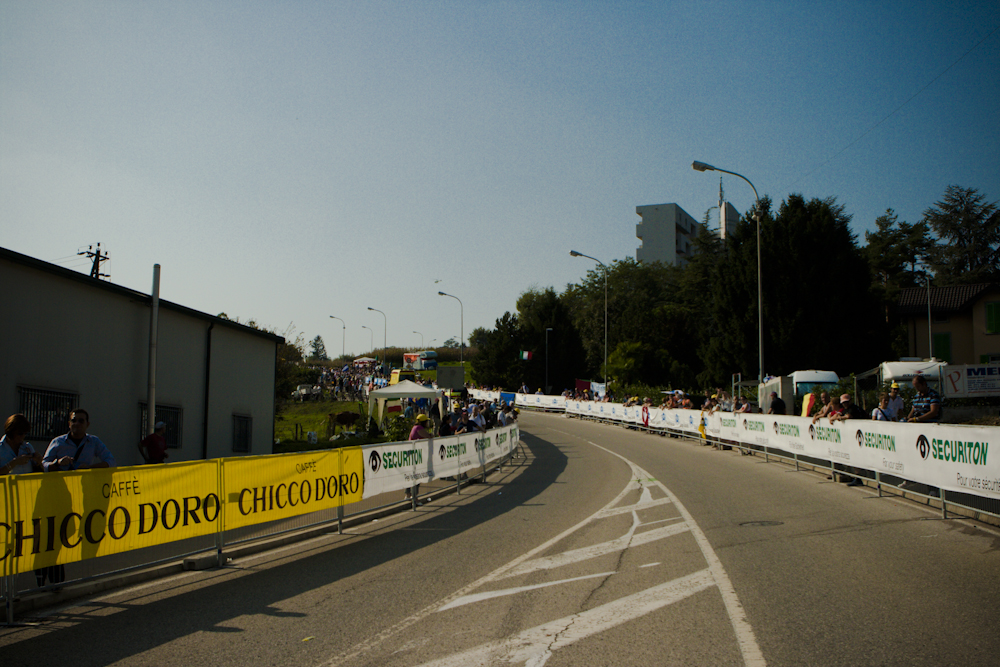

- Flag Coat of arms
- Location of Novazzano
- Location within Switzerland Location within Canton of Ticino
- Coordinates: 45°51′N 8°59′E
- Country: Switzerland
- Canton: Ticino
- District: Mendrisio

Government
  - Mayor: Sindaco; Adriano Piffaretti

Area
  - Total: 5.18 km^{2} (2.00 sq mi)
- Elevation: 345 m (1,132 ft)

Population (December 2004)
  - Total: 2,435
  - Density: 470/km^{2} (1,220/sq mi)
- Time zone: UTC+01:00 (CET)
  - Summer (DST): UTC+02:00 (CEST)
- Postal code: 6883
- SFOS number: 5260
- ISO 3166 code: CH-TI
- Surrounded by: Balerna, Bizzarone (IT-CO), Chiasso, Coldrerio, Genestrerio, Mendrisio, Ronago (IT-CO), Uggiate-Trevano (IT-CO)
- Website: novazzano.ch

Novazzano (Italian pronunciation: [novatˈtsaːno]) is a municipality in the district of Mendrisio in the canton of Ticino in Switzerland.

== History ==
Novazzano is first mentioned in 875 as Nepotiano. In 1152 it was mentioned as Novezano.

Novazzano been inhabited since the Roman era, in Castel di Sotto Roman altar fragments have been found. During the Middle Ages Novazzano belonged to the county of Seprio. It was first mentioned as a municipality in 1335. In 1567, the village separated from the political and religious authority of the Pieve of Balerna, to become an independent parish.

The parish church of SS Quirico e Giulitta (in the 13th century known as SS Giovanni e Quirico) is first mentioned in 1330, but is of older origin. The romanesque clock tower is from the 12th century. It was rebuilt in 1776–79 and renovated in 1998–99. During the 1998–99 renovation, an archaeological investigation was done around the church.

The local economy was once dominated by agriculture, but in the 1950s it experienced strong industrial development with an associated strong population growth. In 2005, the manufacturing sector provided more than half of the jobs, many of which were filled by commuters. A precision foundry in the municipality has about 500 employees. In 2000, about three-quarters of workers were commuters.

== Geography ==
Novazzano has an area, as of 1997, of 5.18 square kilometers (2.00 sq mi). Of this area, 2.78 km^{2} (1.07 sq mi) or 53.7% is used for agricultural purposes, while 1.71 km^{2} (0.66 sq mi) or 33.0% is forested. Of the rest of the land, 1.27 km^{2} (0.49 sq mi) or 24.5% is settled (buildings or roads), 0.01 km^{2} (2.5 acres) or 0.2% is either rivers or lakes and 0.06 km^{2} (15 acres) or 1.2% is unproductive land.

Of the built up area, industrial buildings made up 2.7% of the total area while housing and buildings made up 12.7% and transportation infrastructure made up 5.6%. Power and water infrastructure as well as other special developed areas made up 2.3% of the area while parks, green belts and sports fields made up 1.2%. Out of the forested land, 28.8% of the total land area is heavily forested and 4.2% is covered with orchards or small clusters of trees. Of the agricultural land, 32.4% is used for growing crops, while 8.5% is used for orchards or vine crops and 12.7% is used for alpine pastures. All the water in the municipality is flowing water.

The municipality is located in the Mendrisio district, in the hilly country along the Swiss-Italian border. It consists of the village of Novazzano and the hamlet of Brusata.

== Coat of arms ==
The blazon of the municipal coat of arms is Gules a greyhound rampant reguardant argent.

== Demographics ==
Novazzano has a population (as of December 2020) of 2,338. As of 2008, 15.7% of the population are resident foreign nationals. Over the last 10 years (1997–2007) the population has changed at a rate of 2.9%.

Most of the population (as of 2000) speaks Italian language (2,213 or 93.4%), with German being second most common (86 or 3.6%) and French being third (20 or 0.8%). There are 3 people who speak Romansh.

As of 2008, the gender distribution of the population was 48.1% male and 51.9% female. The population was made up of 969 Swiss men (39.7% of the population), and 205 (8.4%) non-Swiss men. There were 1,088 Swiss women (44.6%), and 178 (7.3%) non-Swiss women. Of the population in the municipality 817 or about 34.5% were born in Novazzano and lived there in 2000. There were 760 or 32.1% who were born in the same canton, while 205 or 8.7% were born somewhere else in Switzerland, and 563 or 23.8% were born outside of Switzerland.

In 2008 there were 16 live births to Swiss citizens and 2 births to non-Swiss citizens, and in same time span there were 20 deaths of Swiss citizens and 4 non-Swiss citizen deaths. Ignoring immigration and emigration, the population of Swiss citizens decreased by 4 while the foreign population decreased by 2. There were 2 Swiss men and 1 Swiss woman who immigrated back to Switzerland. At the same time, there were 2 non-Swiss men and 5 non-Swiss women who immigrated from another country to Switzerland. The total Swiss population change in 2008 (from all sources, including moves across municipal borders) was a decrease of 10 and the non-Swiss population change was a decrease of 5 people. This represents a population growth rate of −0.6%.

The age distribution, as of 2009, in Novazzano is; 199 children or 8.2% of the population are between 0 and 9 years old and 262 teenagers or 10.7% are between 10 and 19. Of the adult population, 210 people or 8.6% of the population are between 20 and 29 years old. 337 people or 13.8% are between 30 and 39, 457 people or 18.7% are between 40 and 49, and 296 people or 12.1% are between 50 and 59. The senior population distribution is 279 people or 11.4% of the population are between 60 and 69 years old, 255 people or 10.5% are between 70 and 79, there are 145 people or 5.9% who are over 80.

As of 2000, there were 898 people who were single and never married in the municipality. There were 1,225 married individuals, 147 widows or widowers and 99 individuals who are divorced.

As of 2000, there were 941 private households in the municipality, and an average of 2.5 persons per household. There were 222 households that consist of only one person and 41 households with five or more people. Out of a total of 943 households that answered this question, 23.5% were households made up of just one person and 19 were adults who lived with their parents. Of the rest of the households, there are 232 married couples without children, 378 married couples with children There were 63 single parents with a child or children. There were 27 households that were made up unrelated people and 2 households that were made some sort of institution or another collective housing.

In 2000 there were 318 single family homes (or 58.9% of the total) out of a total of 540 inhabited buildings. There were 167 multi-family buildings (30.9%), along with 28 multi-purpose buildings that were mostly used for housing (5.2%) and 27 other use buildings (commercial or industrial) that also had some housing (5.0%). Of the single family homes 11 were built before 1919, while 43 were built between 1990 and 2000. The greatest number of single family homes (64) were built between 1981 and 1990.

In 2000 there were 1,012 apartments in the municipality. The most common apartment size was 4 rooms of which there were 373. There were 18 single room apartments and 267 apartments with five or more rooms. Of these apartments, a total of 941 apartments (93.0% of the total) were permanently occupied, while 44 apartments (4.3%) were seasonally occupied and 27 apartments (2.7%) were empty. As of 2007, the construction rate of new housing units was 5.8 new units per 1000 residents. The vacancy rate for the municipality, in 2008, was 1.49%.

The historical population is given in the following chart:

== Sights ==
The entire village of Brusata is designated as part of the Inventory of Swiss Heritage Sites.

== Politics ==
In the 2007 federal election the most popular party was the CVP which received 30.68% of the vote. The next three most popular parties were the FDP (29.83%), the Ticino League (15.56%) and the SP (14.76%). In the federal election, a total of 941 votes were cast, and the voter turnout was 54.7%.

In the 2007 Gran Consiglio election, there were a total of 1,742 registered voters in Novazzano, of which 1,256 or 72.1% voted. 27 blank ballots and 1 null ballot were cast, leaving 1,228 valid ballots in the election. The most popular party was the PLRT which received 402 or 32.7% of the vote. The next three most popular parties were; the PPD+GenGiova (with 280 or 22.8%), the SSI (with 162 or 13.2%) and the LEGA (with 156 or 12.7%).

In the 2007 Consiglio di Stato election, 19 blank ballots and 3 null ballots were cast, leaving 1,234 valid ballots in the election. The most popular party was the PLRT which received 357 or 28.9% of the vote. The next three most popular parties were; the PPD (with 268 or 21.7%), the LEGA (with 235 or 19.0%) and the PS (with 186 or 15.1%).

== Economy ==
As of 2007, Novazzano had an unemployment rate of 2.83%. As of 2005, there were 58 people employed in the primary economic sector and about 21 businesses involved in this sector. 716 people were employed in the secondary sector and there were 30 businesses in this sector. 595 people were employed in the tertiary sector, with 85 businesses in this sector. There were 1,057 residents of the municipality who were employed in some capacity, of which females made up 40.4% of the workforce.

In 2008 the total number of full-time equivalent jobs was 1,575. The number of jobs in the primary sector was 39, all of which were in agriculture. The number of jobs in the secondary sector was 890, of which 807 or (90.7%) were in manufacturing and 71 (8.0%) were in construction. The number of jobs in the tertiary sector was 646. In the tertiary sector; 175 or 27.1% were in wholesale or retail sales or the repair of motor vehicles, 259 or 40.1% were in the movement and storage of goods, 45 or 7.0% were in a hotel or restaurant, 5 or 0.8% were in the information industry, 14 or 2.2% were the insurance or financial industry, 27 or 4.2% were technical professionals or scientists, 24 or 3.7% were in education and 64 or 9.9% were in health care.

In 2000, there were 2,039 workers who commuted into the municipality and 823 workers who commuted away. The municipality is a net importer of workers, with about 2.5 workers entering the municipality for every one leaving. About 40.6% of the workforce coming into Novazzano are coming from outside Switzerland, while 1.0% of the locals commute out of Switzerland for work. Of the working population, 7.5% used public transportation to get to work, and 72.6% used a private car.

As of 2009, there was one hotel in Novazzano.

== Religion ==
From the 2000 census, 2,124 or 89.7% were Roman Catholic, while 71 or 3.0% belonged to the Swiss Reformed Church. Of the rest of the population, there were 6 members of an Orthodox church (or about 0.25% of the population), there were 12 individuals (or about 0.51% of the population) who belonged to the Christian Catholic Church, and there were 19 individuals (or about 0.80% of the population) who belonged to another Christian church. There was 1 individual who was Jewish, and 19 (or about 0.80% of the population) who were Islamic. 79 (or about 3.33% of the population) belonged to no church, are agnostic or atheist, and 38 individuals (or about 1.60% of the population) did not answer the question.

== Education ==
In Novazzano about 936 or (39.5%) of the population have completed non-mandatory upper secondary education, and 228 or (9.6%) have completed additional higher education (either university or a Fachhochschule). Of the 228 who completed tertiary schooling, 53.5% were Swiss men, 32.9% were Swiss women, 11.4% were non-Swiss men and 2.2% were non-Swiss women.

In Novazzano there were a total of 376 students (as of 2009). The Ticino education system provides up to three years of non-mandatory kindergarten and in Novazzano there were 53 children in kindergarten. The primary school program lasts for five years and includes both a standard school and a special school. In the municipality, 117 students attended the standard primary schools and 4 students attended the special school. In the lower secondary school system, students either attend a two-year middle school followed by a two-year pre-apprenticeship or they attend a four-year program to prepare for higher education. There were 102 students in the two-year middle school and 2 in their pre-apprenticeship, while 42 students were in the four-year advanced program.

The upper secondary school includes several options, but at the end of the upper secondary program, a student will be prepared to enter a trade or to continue on to a university or college. In Ticino, vocational students may either attend school while working on their internship or apprenticeship (which takes three or four years) or may attend school followed by an internship or apprenticeship (which takes one year as a full-time student or one and a half to two years as a part-time student). There were 29 vocational students who were attending school full-time and 25 who attend part-time.

The professional program lasts three years and prepares a student for a job in engineering, nursing, computer science, business, tourism and similar fields. There were 2 students in the professional program.

As of 2000, there were 55 students in Novazzano who came from another municipality, while 187 residents attended schools outside the municipality.
