= Pontegana Castle =

Castle in Ticino, Switzerland

Coordinates: 45.843009°N 9.015785°E

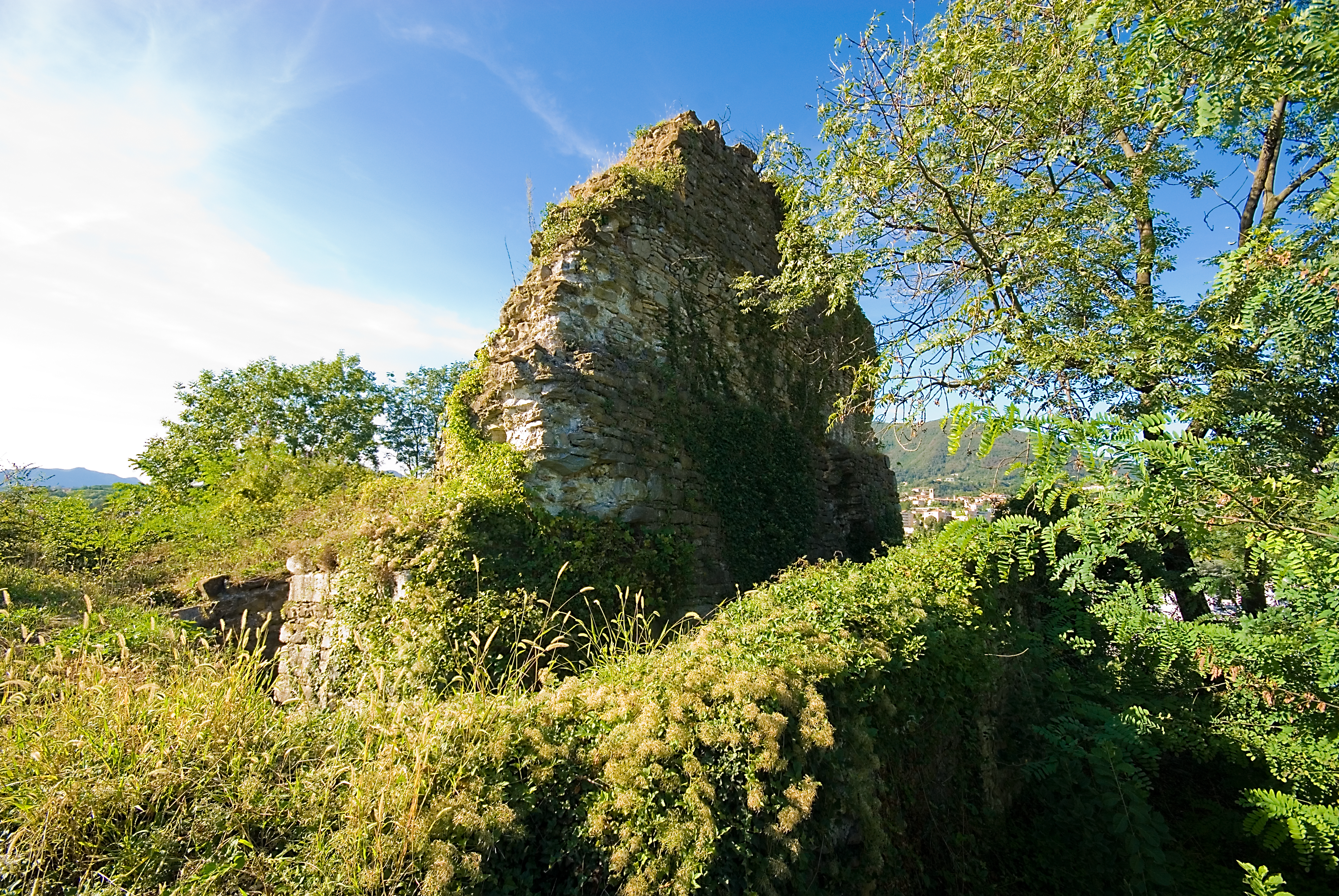

Pontegana Castle is a ruined castle in the municipality of Balerna in the canton of Ticino in Switzerland.
