= Ronago =

Ronago Runàgh (Lombard)
- Comune
- Comune di Ronago
- Location within Italy Location within Lombardy
- Coordinates: 45°50′N 8°59′E
- Country: Italy
- Region: Lombardy
- Province: Como (CO)

Government
  - Mayor: Agostino Grisoni

Area
  - Total: 2.09 km^{2} (0.81 sq mi)

Population (31 March 2017)
  - Total: 1,711
  - Density: 819/km^{2} (2,120/sq mi)
- Demonym: Ronaghesi
- Time zone: UTC+1 (CET)
  - Summer (DST): UTC+2 (CEST)
- Postal code: 22027
- Dialing code: 031
- Patron saint: St. Victor and St. Defendens
- Website: Official website

Ronago (Comasco: Runàgh) is a comune (municipality) in the Province of Como in the Italian region Lombardy, located about 45 kilometres (28 mi) northwest of Milan and about 8 kilometres (5 mi) west of Como, on the border with Switzerland.

Ronago borders the following municipalities: Chiasso (Switzerland), Colverde, Novazzano (Switzerland), Uggiate-Trevano.
