= Antonio Soldini =

Swiss-Italian sculptor

Antonio Soldini (May 4, 1854 – May 12, 1933 in Lugano) was a Swiss-Italian sculptor. He was born in Chiasso, near Milan.

His father was a policeman, and Soldini received his early education in Lugano, then trained as a stonemason in Bellinzona and Viggiù. From 1873 he enrolled at the Brera Academy and worked under Vincenzo Vela. By 1877 Soldini was producing independent works as a sculptor and was active in Milan and later in Bissone. He exhibited many busts in stucco and marble. At the 1881 Exhibition of Fine Arts in Milan, he displayed a Portrait of a Man and a Portrait of professor Gorini (stucco). A marble high-relief exhibited in 1886 in Milan, depicted: Selvaggina (Hunted Game); at the 1884 Exhibition of Fine Arts of Turin. At the 1887 National Artistic Exposition of Venice he also exhibited a sculpture of game. He also made portrait busts. He completed four medallions in the spandrels of the cupola hall of the Federal Palace in Bern.

Soldini was a liberal active in politics. From 1902 to 1905 he was a member of the National Council. From 1915 to 1927, he was mayor of Bissone, 1923-1927 and 1931–1933. He was a member of the Ticino cantonal parliament.
