= Pedrinate =

Village in Ticino, Switzerland

Coordinates: 45°50′N 9°01′E

Pedrinate is a village and former municipality in Switzerland, in the Swiss canton of Ticino. The municipality was aggregated in the Chiasso municipality in 1975 along with Seseglio. The village is located above Chiasso, on the Penz hill. Pedrinate is the southernmost village in Switzerland.

Around Pedrinate there are some vineyards.
