= Piz Chavalatsch =

Mountain in the Ortler Range of the Alps of eastern Switzerland and northern Italy

- Monte Cavallaccio
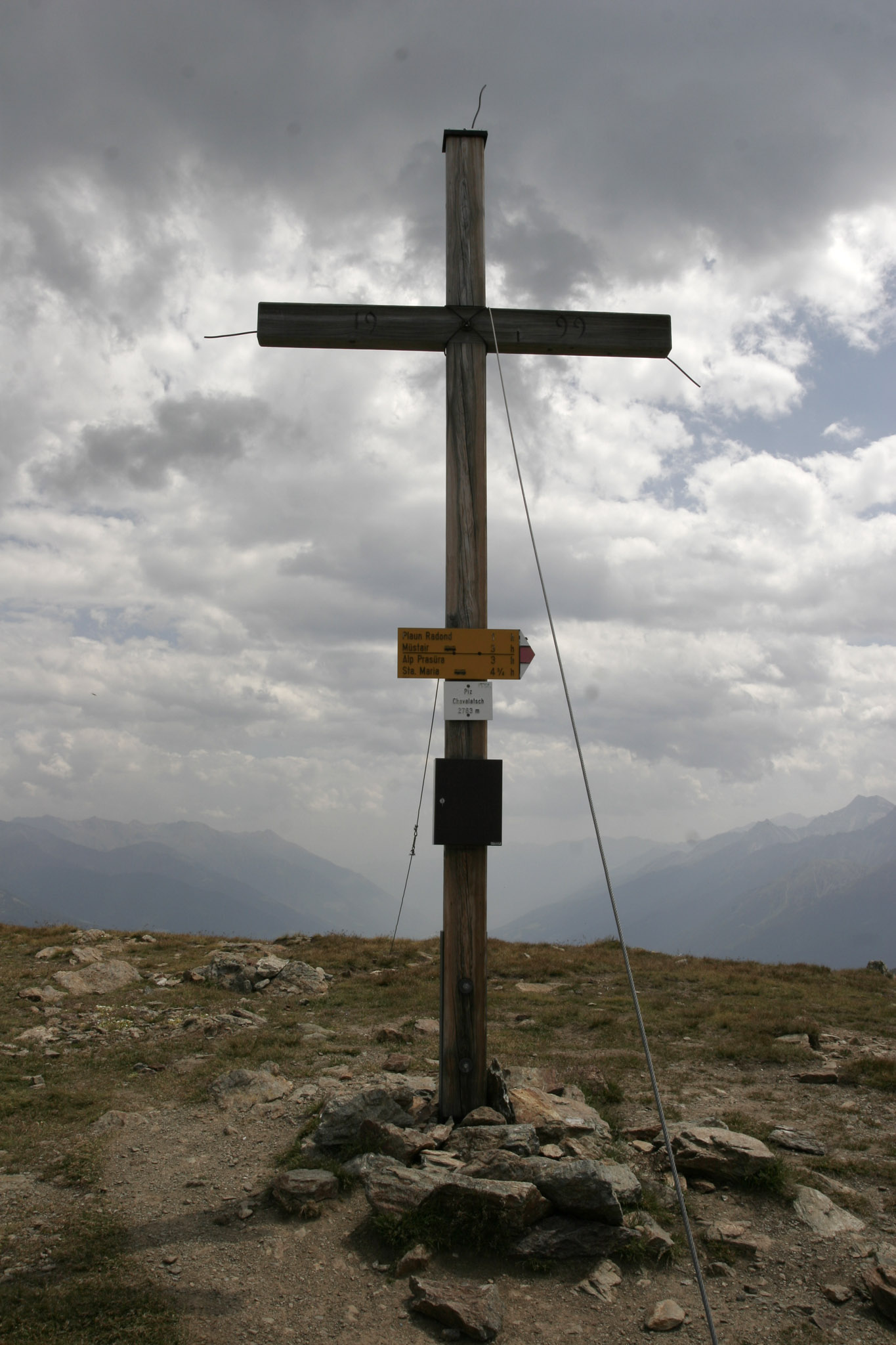

Highest point
- Elevation: 2,763 m (9,065 ft)
- Prominence: 171 m (561 ft)
- Parent peak: Ortler
- Coordinates: 46°36′55.1″N 10°29′31.3″E

Geography
- Location within Alps
- Location: South Tyrol, Italy/Graubünden, Switzerland
- Parent range: Ortler Alps

Piz Chavalatsch (also known as Monte Cavallaccio) (2,763 m) is a mountain in the Ortler Range of the Alps of eastern Switzerland and northern Italy. It forms the border between the Swiss canton of Graubünden and the Italian Province of Bolzano.

The easternmost point of Switzerland is located at Piz Chavalatsch at c. 46°36′55.1″N 10°29′31.3″E (Swiss Grid: 833841/166938).
