= Gironico =

- Frazione
- Location of Gironico in Italy
- Coordinates: 45°48′N 9°0′E
- Country: Italy
- Region: Lombardy
- Province: Como (CO)
- Comune: Colverde

Area
  - Total: 4.5 km^{2} (1.7 sq mi)
- Elevation: 370 m (1,210 ft)

Population (Dec. 2004)
  - Total: 2,133
  - Density: 470/km^{2} (1,200/sq mi)
- Demonym: Gironichesi
- Time zone: UTC+1 (CET)
  - Summer (DST): UTC+2 (CEST)
- Postal code: 22020
- Dialing code: 031

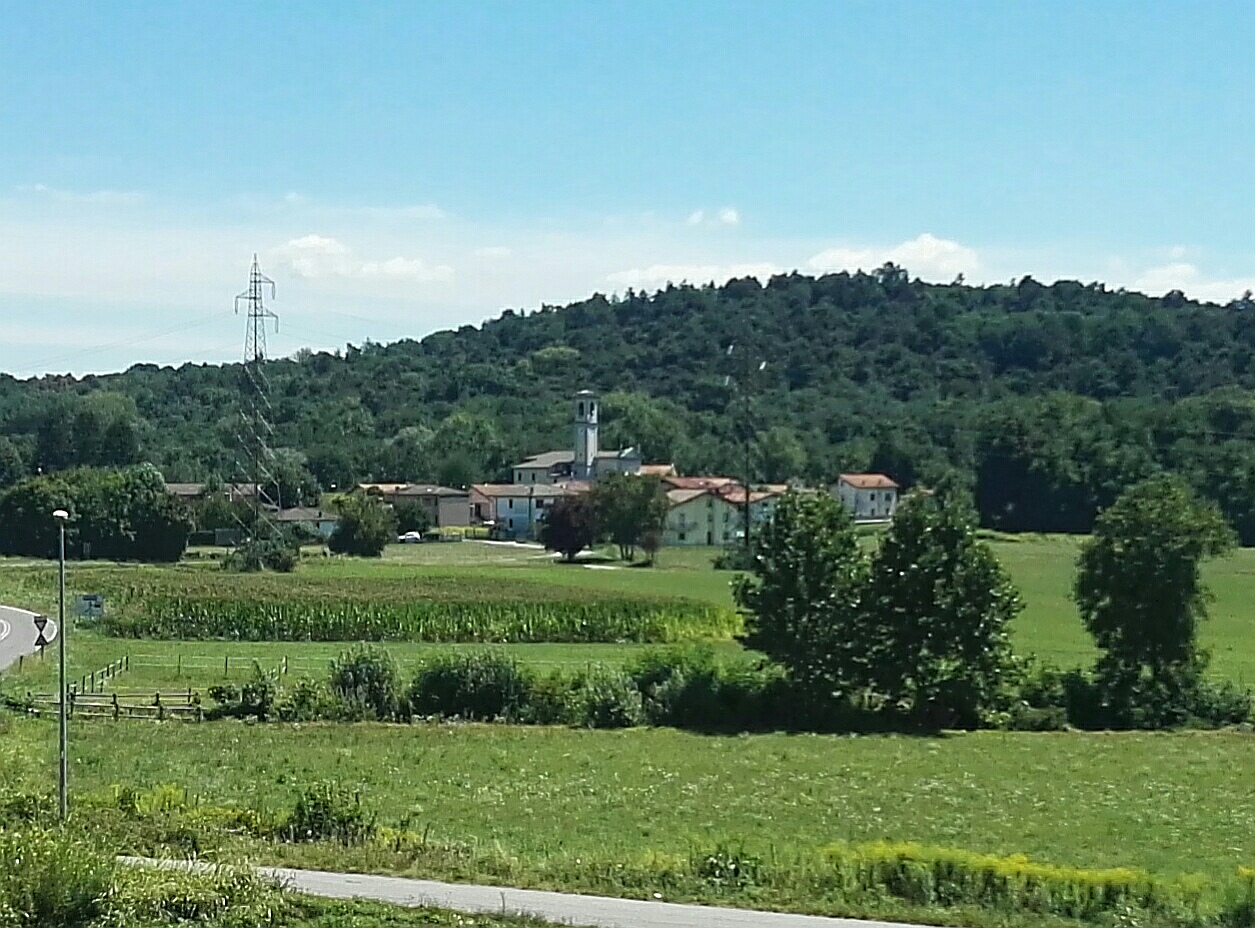
Gironico

Gironico is a frazione of the comune (municipality) of Colverde in the Province of Como in the Italian region Lombardy, located about 40 kilometres (25 mi) northwest of Milan and about 7 kilometres (4 mi) southwest of Como. It was a separate comune until 2014.
