= List of extreme points of Switzerland =

This is a list of the extreme points of Switzerland.

== Elevation ==
Type	Point	Location	Canton	Elevation	Coordinates
highest point	Monte Rosa	Zermatt	Valais	4634 m	45°56′12″N 007°52′00″E
lowest point	Lake Maggiore	Locarno (district)	Ticino	193 m	46.14°N 8.8°E
highest city	St. Moritz	St. Moritz	Grisons	1822 m	46°29′50″N 9°50′16″E
highest village	Juf	Avers	Grisons	2126 m	46°26′44″N 009°34′45″E
highest train station	Jungfraujoch	Fieschertal (in Bernese Oberland)	Bern	3454 m	46°32′55″N 007°58′59″E
highest airport	Samedan Airport	Samedan	Grisons	1707 m	46°32′02″N 009°53′02″E
highest cable car	Klein Matterhorn	Zermatt	Valais	3883 m	45°56′18″N 007°43′47″E
highest ski area	Gobba di Rollin	Zermatt	Valais	3899 m	
highest waterfall	2nd of the Seerenbach Falls	Betlis, Amden	St. Gallen	(302 m of 585 m)	47°09′N 009°08′E
(tallest structure)	Grande Dixence Dam	Hérémence	Valais	(285 m)	46°4.8′N 7°24′E

== Latitude and longitude ==
Description	Location	Municipality	Canton	Swiss Grid	Coordinates	Pic
Northernmost point	47°48'N at Oberbargen	Bargen	Schaffhausen	684600.234 / 295933.843	47°48′29.75″N 008°34′04.43″E	
Southernmost point	45°49'N at Pedrinate	Chiasso	Ticino		45°49′04.91″N 009°00′59.34″E	
Westernmost point	5°57'E	Chancy	Geneva		46°07′56.07″N 005°57′22.69″E	
Easternmost point	10°29'E at Piz Chavalatsch	Val Müstair	Grisons	833841 / 166938	46°36′46″N 10°29′31″E	

== See also ==
- Extreme points of Earth
- Geography of Switzerland
