= Drezzo =

- Frazione
- Location of Drezzo in Italy
- Coordinates: 45°49′N 9°0′E
- Country: Italy
- Region: Lombardy
- Province: Como (CO)
- Comune: Colverde

Area
  - Total: 1.9 km^{2} (0.73 sq mi)

Population (Dec. 2004)
  - Total: 1,088
  - Density: 570/km^{2} (1,500/sq mi)
- Time zone: UTC+1 (CET)
  - Summer (DST): UTC+2 (CEST)
- Postal code: 22020
- Dialing code: 031

Drezzo is a frazione of the comune of Colverde, located in the Province of Como in the Lombardy region of Italy. It lies approximately 40 kilometres (25 mi) northwest of Milan and about 6 kilometres (4 mi) west of Como, near the Swiss border. Formerly an independent comune, Drezzo was incorporated into Colverde in 2014.

While it was separate, the comune passed an ordinance that forbade the wearing of a veil in order to "render the identification of a person difficult in public spaces", which resulted in the fining of a local woman.

The local church is the parish of San Rocco.
