= Time in Switzerland =

Switzerland uses Central European Time (CET) during the winter as standard time, which is one hour ahead of Coordinated Universal Time (UTC+01:00), and Central European Summer Time (CEST) during the summer as daylight saving time, which is two hours ahead of Coordinated Universal Time (UTC+02:00).

== History ==
The electrical telegraph was introduced in Switzerland in 1851, which allowed near real-time communication, especially amongst post offices. By July 1853, all telegraph and post offices across Switzerland were using Bernese time, a local mean time measured from the Zytglogge clocktower at UTC+00:29:45.5. (Note: Measured at 46°57′08″N 7°26′22″E.) Bernese time was also used on train timetables by at least 1873. On 1 June 1894, UTC+01:00 was officially adopted nationwide. Daylight saving time was first attempted between 1941 and 1942, by moving the clocks forward one hour at 01:00 on the first Monday in May, and back again at 02:00 on the first Monday in October. The decision to observe daylight saving time was made by the Federal Council on behalf of the recommendation of the Federal Chancellery.

Whilst DST was introduced in much of Western Europe in the spring of 1980, Switzerland did not implement DST until the following year due to popular opposition as expressed by a referendum in 1978. This resulted in there being a one-hour time difference between Switzerland and most of Western Europe, including all of the bordering countries (with the exception of Liechtenstein) for around six months in 1980.

The German village of Büsingen am Hochrhein, a small exclave, entirely surrounded by Swiss territory, did not implement DST in 1980 either and observed the same time as Switzerland, meaning there was a one-hour time difference between this village and the rest of Germany. The zone Europe/Busingen was created in the 2013a release of the tz database, because since the Unix time epoch in 1970, Büsingen has shared clocks with Zurich.

Since 1981 the shifts to DST occur on the date as specified for European Summer Time.

== Solar time ==
The difference of longitude between the western and easternmost points of Switzerland is equivalent to 4°32′09", resulting in a difference of approximately 18 minutes of solar time.

== IANA time zone database ==
The IANA time zone database contains one zone for Switzerland in the file zone.tab, named Europe/Zurich. Columns marked with * are the columns from zone.tab itself.

c.c.*	Coordinates*	TZ*	Comments*	UTC offset	UTC DST offset
CH	+4723+00832	Europe/Zurich	Büsingen	+01:00	+02:00

Computers not supporting "Europe/Zurich" may use the older POSIX syntax: TZ='CET-1CEST,M3.5.0/2,M10.5.0/3'
