= Colverde =

Colverde Colverd (Lombard)
- Comune
- Comune di Colverde

- Location within Italy Location within Lombardy
- Coordinates: 45°49′N 9°0′E
- Country: Italy
- Region: Lombardy
- Province: Province of Como (CO)
- Frazioni: Drezzo, Gironico, Parè (municipal seat)

Government
  - Mayor: Marina Pellin

Area
  - Total: 8.58 km^{2} (3.31 sq mi)
- Elevation: 412 m (1,352 ft)

Population (31 December 2017)ISTAT
  - Total: 5,381
  - Density: 627/km^{2} (1,620/sq mi)
- Time zone: UTC+1 (CET)
  - Summer (DST): UTC+2 (CEST)
- Postal code: 22041
- Dialing code: 031
- Website: Official website
- created in 2014

Colverde (Comasco: Colverd [ˌkulˈveːrt]) is a comune in the province of Como, in Lombardy, that was formed in May 2014 from fusion of comuni di Drezzo, Gironico and Parè. A referendum to create this comune was held on 1 December 2013 in the former comuni: the results were 78% yes and 22% no.
