= List of municipalities of the Province of Como =

The following is a list of the 147 municipalities (comuni) of the Province of Como in the region of Lombardy in Italy.

== List ==
Municipality	Population (2026)	Area (km²)	Density
Albavilla	6,348	10.38	611.6
Albese con Cassano	4,277	7.95	538.0
Albiolo	2,800	2.84	985.9
Alserio	1,417	1.99	712.1
Alta Valle Intelvi	3,186	24.95	127.7
Alzate Brianza	4,834	7.58	637.7
Anzano del Parco	1,675	3.25	515.4
Appiano Gentile	7,749	12.81	604.9
Argegno	676	4.11	164.5
Arosio	5,227	2.58	2,026.0
Asso	3,555	6.51	546.1
Barni	611	5.72	106.8
Bellagio	3,509	29.06	120.8
Bene Lario	349	5.59	62.4
Beregazzo con Figliaro	2,825	3.80	743.4
Binago	4,814	7.12	676.1
Bizzarone	1,789	2.67	670.0
Blessagno	313	3.56	87.9
Blevio	1,002	5.47	183.2
Bregnano	6,402	6.17	1,037.6
Brenna	2,194	4.83	454.2
Brienno	311	8.97	34.7
Brunate	1,572	2.03	774.4
Bulgarograsso	3,957	3.77	1,049.6
Cabiate	7,404	3.18	2,328.3
Cadorago	8,051	7.19	1,119.7
Caglio	476	6.52	73.0
Campione d'Italia	1,848	2.68	689.6
Cantù	40,451	23.25	1,739.8
Canzo	5,223	11.11	470.1
Capiago Intimiano	5,433	5.72	949.8
Carate Urio	1,090	6.94	157.1
Carbonate	2,977	4.92	605.1
Carimate	4,374	5.17	846.0
Carlazzo	3,146	12.73	247.1
Carugo	6,658	4.19	1,589.0
Caslino d'Erba	1,670	6.89	242.4
Casnate con Bernate	5,033	5.22	964.2
Cassina Rizzardi	3,263	3.51	929.6
Castelmarte	1,267	1.97	643.1
Castelnuovo Bozzente	916	3.62	253.0
Cavargna	171	14.98	11.4
Centro Valle Intelvi	3,778	19.66	192.2
Cerano d'Intelvi	593	5.55	106.8
Cermenate	9,457	8.18	1,156.1
Cernobbio	6,152	12.28	501.0
Cirimido	2,198	2.63	835.7
Claino con Osteno	543	12.90	42.1
Colonno	432	5.62	76.9
Colverde	5,553	8.58	647.2
Como	83,035	37.12	2,236.9
Corrido	845	6.19	136.5
Cremia	674	10.14	66.5
Cucciago	3,365	4.93	682.6
Cusino	250	9.65	25.9
Dizzasco	642	3.61	177.8
Domaso	1,392	6.28	221.7
Dongo	3,158	7.04	448.6
Dosso del Liro	235	23.49	10.0
Erba	16,266	17.80	913.8
Eupilio	2,526	6.94	364.0
Faggeto Lario	1,063	17.52	60.7
Faloppio	4,882	4.14	1,179.2
Fenegrò	3,326	5.36	620.5
Figino Serenza	4,972	4.96	1,002.4
Fino Mornasco	10,139	7.24	1,400.4
Garzeno	656	28.76	22.8
Gera Lario	1,065	7.18	148.3
Grandate	2,803	2.83	990.5
Grandola ed Uniti	1,289	16.90	76.3
Gravedona ed Uniti	4,032	39.85	101.2
Griante	553	6.55	84.4
Guanzate	5,810	6.91	840.8
Inverigo	9,149	9.99	915.8
Laglio	813	6.20	131.1
Laino	566	6.68	84.7
Lambrugo	2,544	1.84	1,382.6
Lasnigo	444	5.53	80.3
Lezzeno	1,856	20.70	89.7
Limido Comasco	3,925	4.56	860.7
Lipomo	5,869	2.30	2,551.7
Livo	158	33.13	4.8
Locate Varesino	4,303	6.04	712.4
Lomazzo	10,046	9.48	1,059.7
Longone al Segrino	1,984	1.60	1,240.0
Luisago	2,834	2.16	1,312.0
Lurago d'Erba	5,587	4.70	1,188.7
Lurago Marinone	2,598	3.89	667.9
Lurate Caccivio	9,692	5.93	1,634.4
Magreglio	673	3.08	218.5
Mariano Comense	25,531	13.80	1,850.1
Maslianico	3,162	1.29	2,451.2
Menaggio	2,946	11.77	250.3
Merone	4,003	3.28	1,220.4
Moltrasio	1,485	8.90	166.9
Monguzzo	2,381	3.73	638.3
Montano Lucino	5,479	5.22	1,049.6
Montemezzo	203	9.02	22.5
Montorfano	2,494	3.52	708.5
Mozzate	8,684	10.68	813.1
Musso	935	3.71	252.0
Nesso	1,074	15.03	71.5
Novedrate	2,871	2.92	983.2
Olgiate Comasco	12,184	10.96	1,111.7
Oltrona di San Mamette	2,356	2.69	875.8
Orsenigo	2,638	4.46	591.5
Peglio	193	10.57	18.3
Pianello del Lario	1,074	9.80	109.6
Pigra	229	4.53	50.6
Plesio	807	16.90	47.8
Pognana Lario	657	5.07	129.6
Ponna	223	5.81	38.4
Ponte Lambro	4,266	3.38	1,262.1
Porlezza	4,901	18.64	262.9
Proserpio	951	2.30	413.5
Pusiano	1,301	3.20	406.6
Rezzago	311	4.08	76.2
Rodero	1,282	2.52	508.7
Rovellasca	8,028	3.57	2,248.7
Rovello Porro	6,387	5.53	1,155.0
Sala Comacina	456	4.73	96.4
San Bartolomeo Val Cavargna	926	10.51	88.1
San Fermo della Battaglia	7,770	5.78	1,344.3
San Nazzaro Val Cavargna	256	12.99	19.7
San Siro	1,672	18.79	89.0
Schignano	868	10.12	85.8
Senna Comasco	3,174	2.79	1,137.6
Solbiate con Cagno	4,638	7.62	608.7
Sorico	1,243	24.44	50.9
Sormano	692	10.74	64.4
Stazzona	593	7.29	81.3
Tavernerio	5,586	11.91	469.0
Torno	1,030	7.53	136.8
Tremezzina	4,942	29.41	168.0
Trezzone	231	3.91	59.1
Turate	9,911	10.28	964.1
Uggiate-Trevano	6,825	7.87	867.2
Val Rezzo	172	6.61	26.0
Valbrona	2,622	13.65	192.1
Valmorea	2,595	3.13	829.1
Valsolda	1,434	31.74	45.2
Veleso	195	5.86	33.3
Veniano	3,157	3.15	1,002.2
Vercana	732	15.01	48.8
Vertemate con Minoprio	4,189	5.75	728.5
Villa Guardia	7,867	7.87	999.6
Zelbio	182	4.60	39.6

== See also ==
- List of municipalities of Lombardy
- List of municipalities of Italy
