= Filippo Ghioldi =

Italian footballer (born 1999)

Personal information
- Date of birth: 6 January 1999 (age 27)
- Place of birth: Mozzate, Italy
- Height: 1.80 m (5 ft 11 in)
- Position: Midfielder

Team information
- Current team: Rhodense

Youth career
- Pro Patria

Senior career*
Years	Team	Apps	(Gls)
2017–2023	Pro Patria	60	(2)
2024	Pro Patria	3	(1)
2024–2026	Varesina	39	(0)
2026–	Rhodense		
- * Club domestic league appearances and goals as of 1 February 2026

Filippo Ghioldi (born 6 January 1999) is an Italian professional footballer who plays as a midfielder for Eccellenza club Rhodense.

== Club career ==
A product of Pro Patria's youth system, Ferri was promoted to the first team in 2017. He was part of the team who won the 2017–18 Serie D.

== Honours ==
Pro Patria

- Serie D: 2017–18
