= Cislago =

Cislago Cislagh (Lombard)
- Comune
- Comune di Cislago
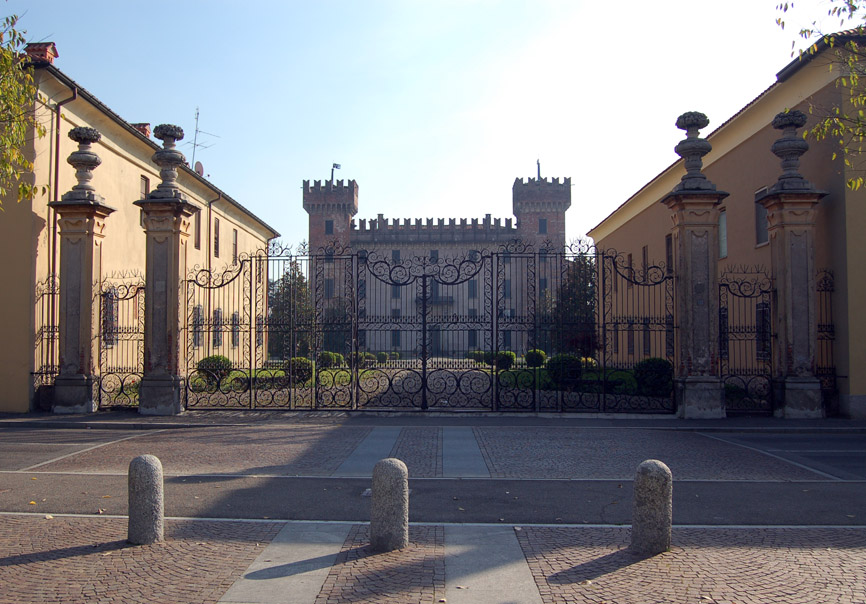

- Location within Italy Location within Lombardy
- Coordinates: 45°39′N 8°58′E
- Country: Italy
- Region: Lombardy
- Province: Province of Varese (VA)
- Frazioni: Massina, Santa Maria, Cascina Visconta

Area
  - Total: 10.92 km^{2} (4.22 sq mi)
- Elevation: 237 m (778 ft)

Population (Dec. 2010)
  - Total: 10,063
  - Density: 921.5/km^{2} (2,387/sq mi)
- Demonym: Cislaghesi
- Time zone: UTC+1 (CET)
  - Summer (DST): UTC+2 (CEST)
- Postal code: 21040
- Dialing code: 02
- Saint day: Second Monday after Easter
- Website: Official website

Cislago (Western Lombard: Cislagh [tʃiˈzlaːk]) is a comune (municipality) in the Province of Varese in the Italian region of Lombardy, located about 25 kilometres (16 mi) northwest of Milan and about 20 kilometres (12 mi) southeast of Varese. As of 31 December 2004, it had a population of 9,118 and an area of 10.9 square kilometres (4.2 mi^{2}).

The municipality of Cislago contains the frazioni (subdivisions, mainly villages and hamlets) Massina, Santa Maria, and Cascina Visconta.

Cislago borders the municipalities of Gerenzano, Gorla Minore, Limido Comasco, Mozzate, Rescaldina, Turate.

== Demographic evolution ==
Historical population

Year	Pop.	±%
1861	2,451	—
1871	2,507	+2.3%
1881	2,696	+7.5%
1901	2,611	−3.2%
1911	3,169	+21.4%

Year	Pop.	±%
1921	3,505	+10.6%
1931	4,040	+15.3%
1936	4,060	+0.5%
1951	4,883	+20.3%
1961	5,832	+19.4%

Year	Pop.	±%
1971	6,729	+15.4%
1981	7,264	+8.0%
1991	7,820	+7.7%
2001	8,683	+11.0%

Source: Data from ISTAT
