= Guanzate =

Guanzate Guanzaa (Lombard)
- Comune
- Comune di Guanzate
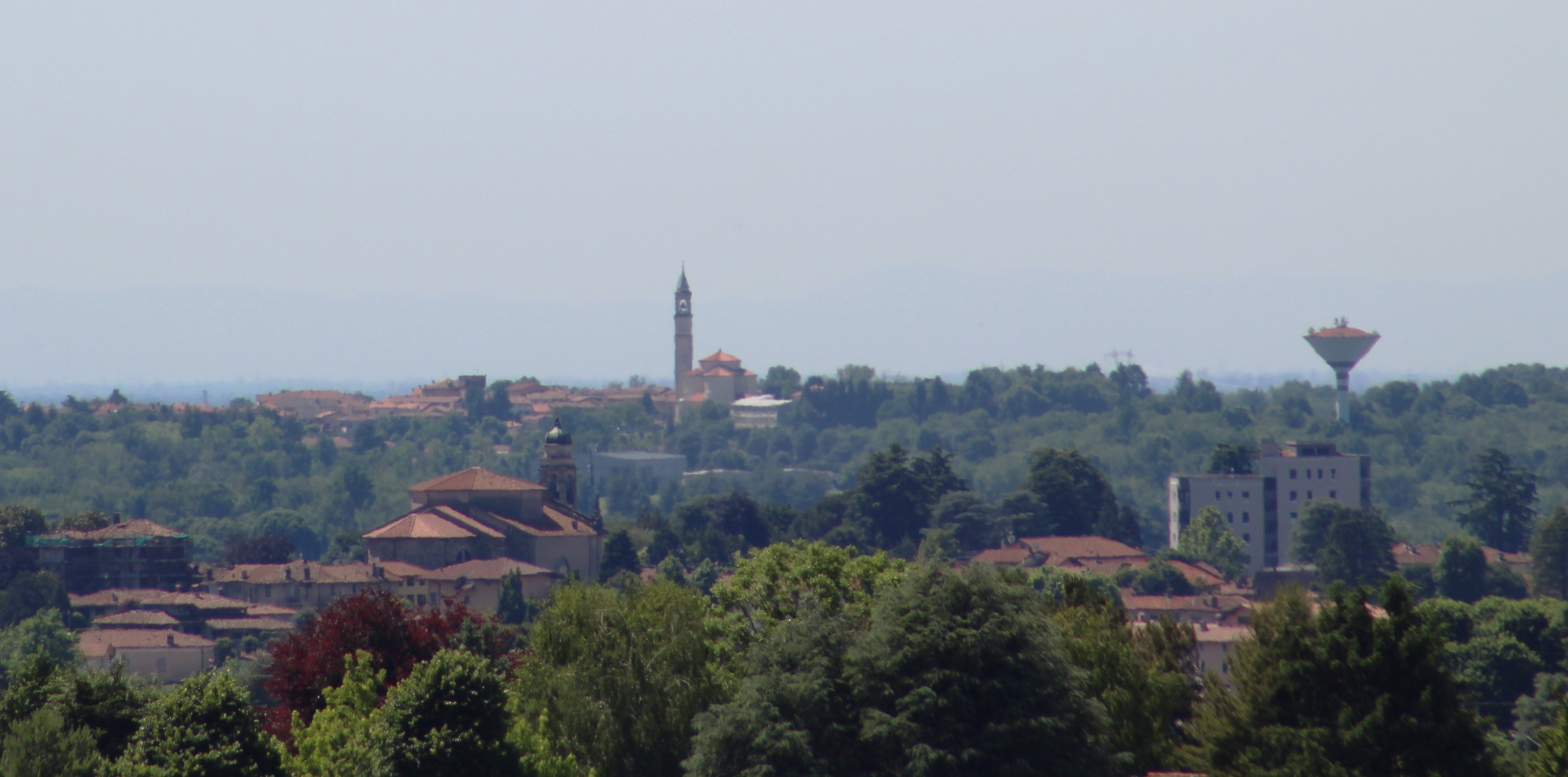
- View of Guanzate

- Location within Italy Location within Lombardy
- Coordinates: 45°43′26″N 9°00′38″E
- Country: Italy
- Region: Lombardy
- Province: Province of Como (CO)

Area
  - Total: 6.9 km^{2} (2.7 sq mi)

Population (Dec. 2004)
  - Total: 5,290
  - Density: 770/km^{2} (2,000/sq mi)
- Demonym: Guanzatesi
- Time zone: UTC+1 (CET)
  - Summer (DST): UTC+2 (CEST)
- Postal code: 22070
- Dialing code: 031
- Website: Official website

Guanzate (Comasco: Guanzaa [ɡwãˈtsaː]) is a comune (municipality) in the Province of Como in the Italian region Lombardy, located about 30 kilometres (19 mi) northwest of Milan and about 11 kilometres (7 mi) southwest of Como. As of 31 December 2004, it had a population of 5,290 and an area of 6.9 km^{2} (2.7 sq mi).

Guanzate borders the following municipalities: Appiano Gentile, Bulgarograsso, Cadorago, Cassina Rizzardi, Cirimido, Fenegrò, Fino Mornasco, Lomazzo, Veniano.

== Demographic evolution ==
Historical population

Year	Pop.	±%
1861	2,322	—
1871	2,218	−4.5%
1881	2,543	+14.7%
1901	2,372	−6.7%
1911	2,409	+1.6%

Year	Pop.	±%
1921	2,307	−4.2%
1931	2,313	+0.3%
1936	2,197	−5.0%
1951	2,323	+5.7%
1961	2,625	+13.0%

Year	Pop.	±%
1971	3,121	+18.9%
1981	3,768	+20.7%
1991	4,275	+13.5%
2001	5,056	+18.3%

Source: Data from ISTAT
