= Fino Mornasco =

Fino Mornasco Fin Mornasch (Lombard)
- Comune
- Comune di Fino Mornasco
- Coat of arms

- Location within Italy Location within Lombardy
- Coordinates: 45°45′N 9°2′E
- Country: Italy
- Region: Lombardy
- Province: Como (CO)
- Frazioni: Socco, Andrate

Government
  - Mayor: Giuseppe Napoli

Area
  - Total: 7.3 km^{2} (2.8 sq mi)
- Elevation: 334 m (1,096 ft)

Population (31 August 2017)
  - Total: 9,845
  - Density: 1,300/km^{2} (3,500/sq mi)
- Demonym: Finesi
- Time zone: UTC+1 (CET)
  - Summer (DST): UTC+2 (CEST)
- Postal code: 22073
- Dialing code: 031
- Website: Official website

Fino Mornasco (Brianzöö: Fin Mornasch [ˈfĩː murˈnask] or simply Fin) is a comune (municipality) in the Province of Como in the Italian region Lombardy, located about 35 kilometres (22 mi) northwest of Milan and about 8 kilometres (5 mi) southwest of Como.

Fino Mornasco borders the following municipalities: Cadorago, Casnate con Bernate, Cassina Rizzardi, Cucciago, Guanzate, Luisago, Vertemate con Minoprio.
