= Lurago Marinone =

Lurago Marinone Luragh (Lombard)
- Comune
- Comune di Lurago Marinone
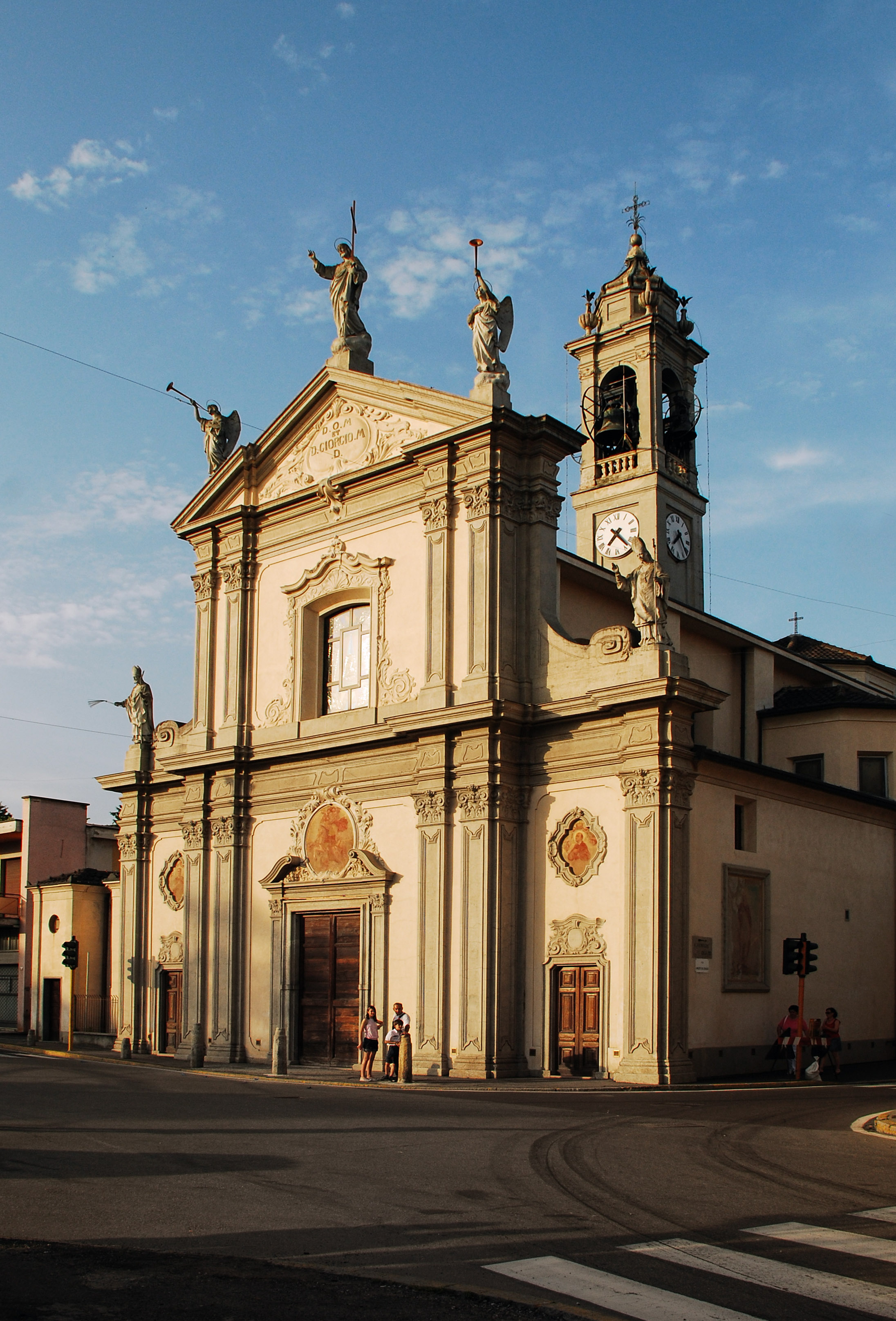
- Church of St.George in Lurago Marinone

- Coat of arms

- Location within Italy Location within Lombardy
- Coordinates: 45°42′N 8°59′E
- Country: Italy
- Region: Lombardy
- Province: Como (CO)

Government
  - Mayor: Luigi Berlusconi

Area
  - Total: 3.8 km^{2} (1.5 sq mi)
- Elevation: 294 m (965 ft)

Population (Dec. 2004)
  - Total: 2,154
  - Density: 570/km^{2} (1,500/sq mi)
- Demonym: Luraghesi
- Time zone: UTC+1 (CET)
  - Summer (DST): UTC+2 (CEST)
- Postal code: 22070
- Dialing code: 031
- Website: Official website

Lurago Marinone (Comasco: Lüragh [lyˈraːk]) is a comune (municipality) in the Province of Como in the Italian region of Lombardy. The comune is located about 30 kilometres (19 mi) northwest of Milan and about 15 kilometres (9 mi) southwest of Como.

Lurago Marinone borders the following municipalities: Appiano Gentile, Carbonate, Fenegrò, Limido Comasco, Mozzate, Veniano.
