= Province of Como =

Province of Italy, located in the Lombardy region

Province of Como Provincia di Como (Italian) Pruincia de Comm (Lombard)
- Province
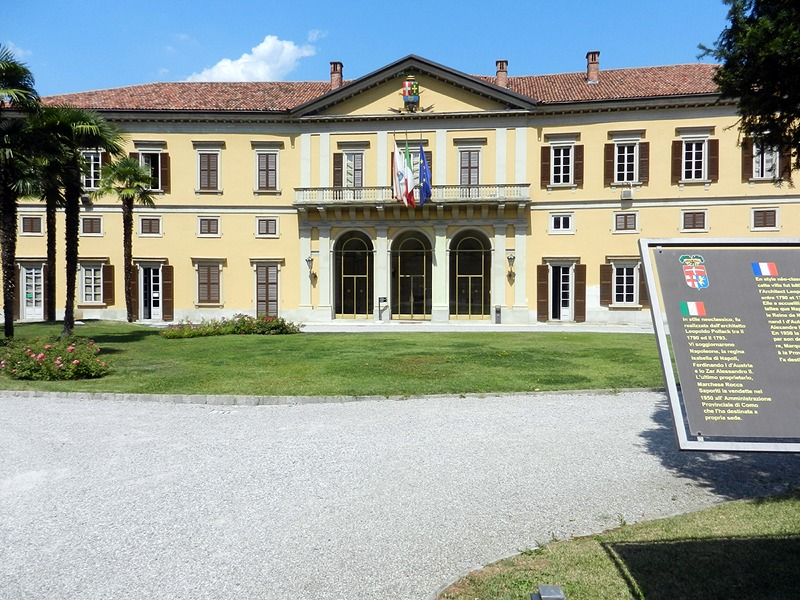
- Villa Saporiti, the seat of the province

- Coat of arms

- Location of the province of Como in Italy
- Coordinates: 45°49′N 9°5′E
- Country: Italy
- Region: Lombardy
- Capital(s): Como
- Municipalities: 147

Government
  - President: Fiorenzo Bongiasca

Area
  - Total: 1,279.04 km^{2} (493.84 sq mi)

Population (2026)
  - Total: 598,562
  - Density: 467.978/km^{2} (1,212.06/sq mi)

GDP
  - Total: €16.310 billion (2015)
  - Per capita: €27,193 (2015)
- Time zone: UTC+1 (CET)
  - Summer (DST): UTC+2 (CEST)
- Postal code: 22100
- Telephone prefix: 031 0344 02 0331
- ISO 3166 code: IT-CO
- Vehicle registration: CO
- ISTAT code: 013
- Website: www.provincia.como.it

Map of the historical regions of the province of Como

The province of Como (Italian: provincia di Como; Comasco: pruincia de Comm) is a province in the region of Lombardy in Italy. It borders the Swiss cantons of Ticino and Grigioni to the north, the Italian provinces of Sondrio and Lecco to the east, the province of Monza and Brianza to the south and the province of Varese to the west.

It has a population of 598,562 in an area of 1,279.04 square kilometres (493.84 sq mi) across its 147 municipalities.

The city of Como is its capital—other large towns, with more than 10,000 inhabitants, include Cantù, Erba, Mariano Comense and Olgiate Comasco.

Campione d'Italia also belongs to the province and is enclaved in the Swiss canton of Ticino. The Lugano Prealps cover the territory of the province, and the most important body of water is the glacial Lake Como.

== Municipalities ==
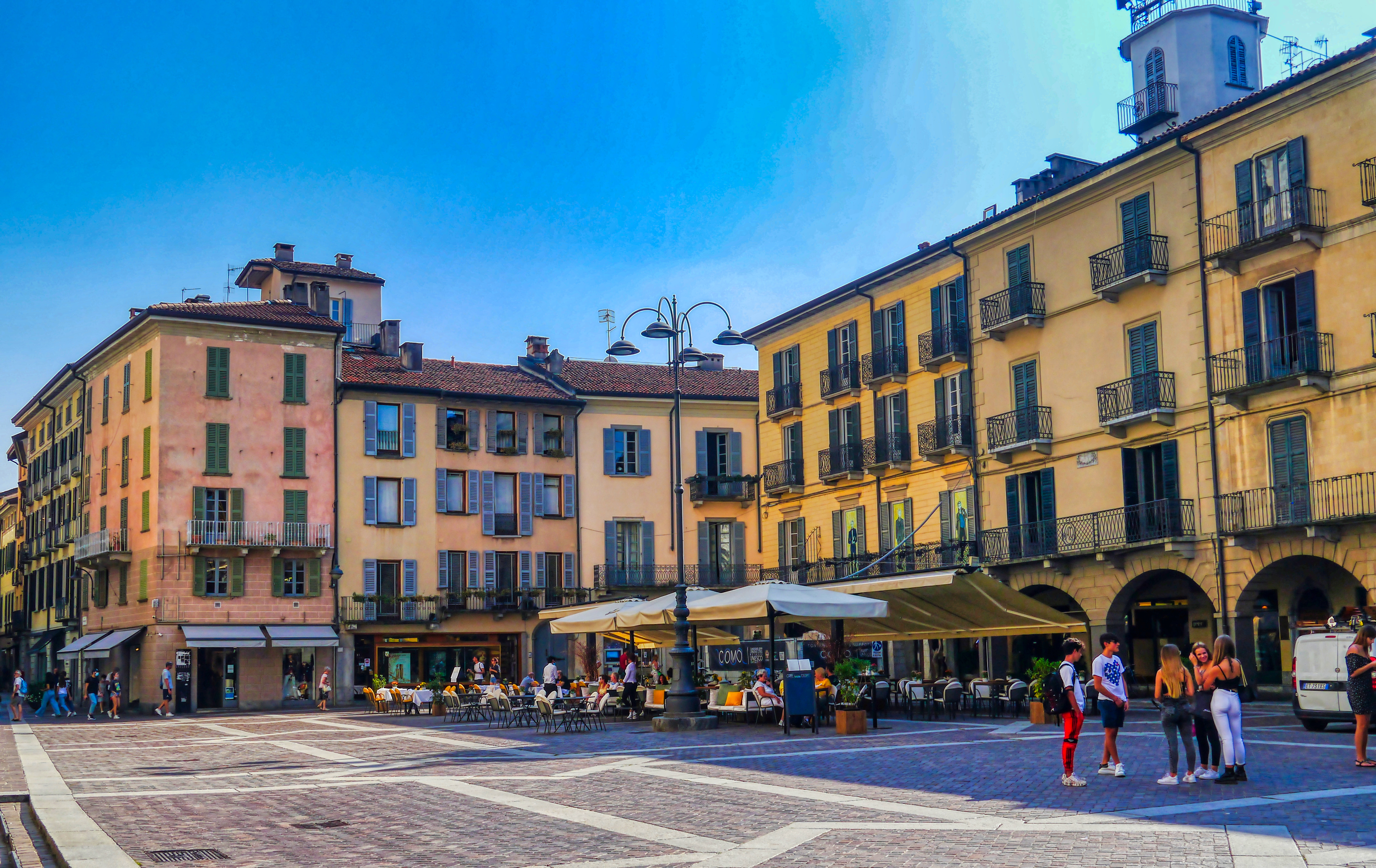
Como

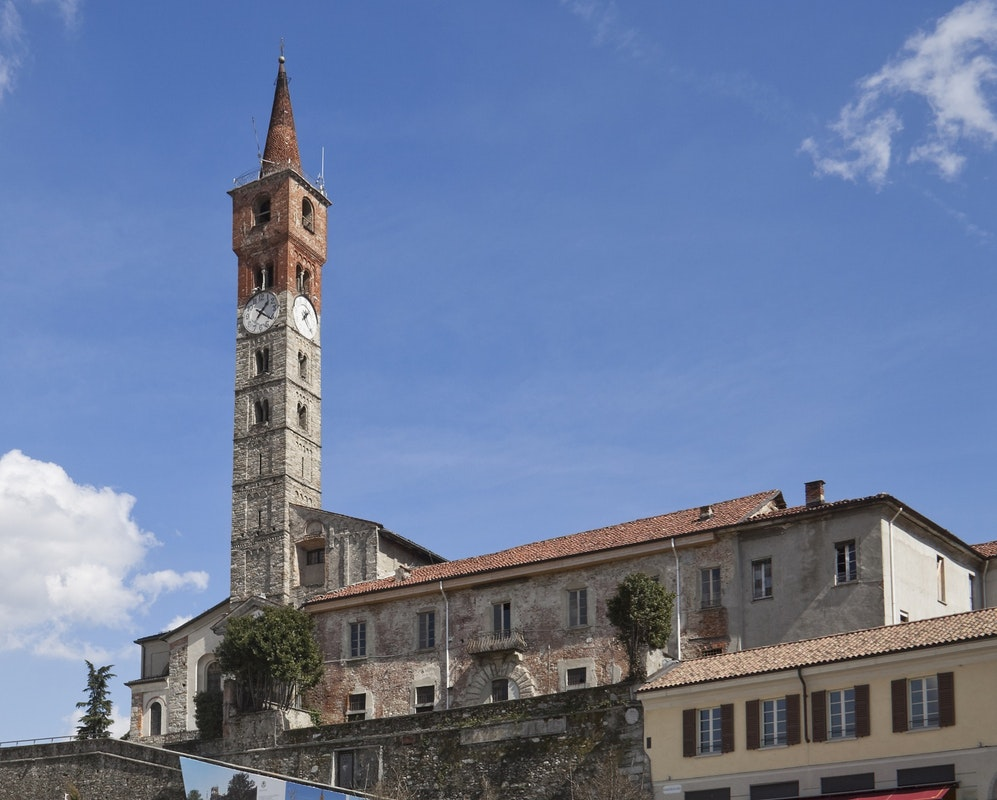
Cantù

Mariano Comense

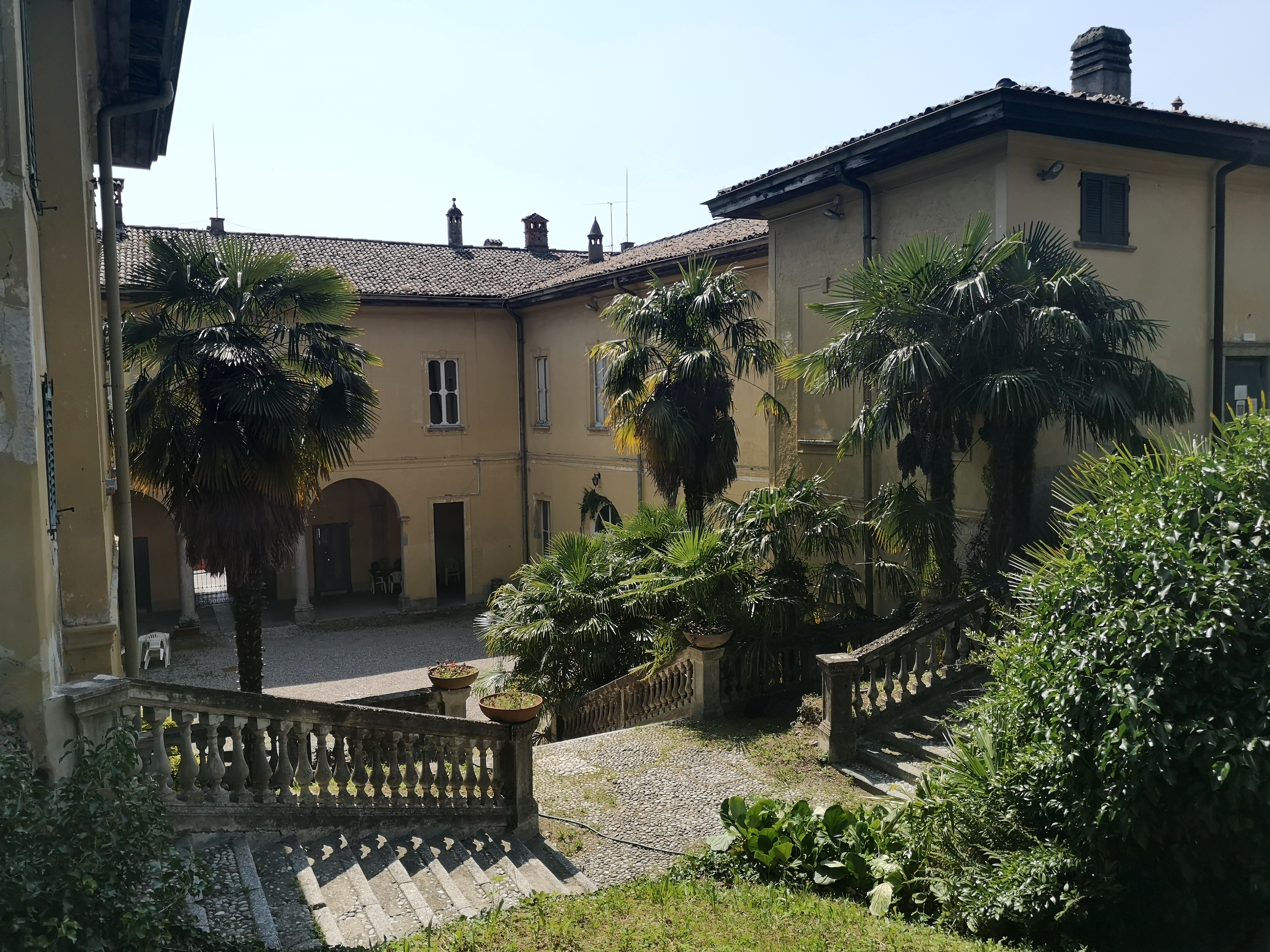
Erba

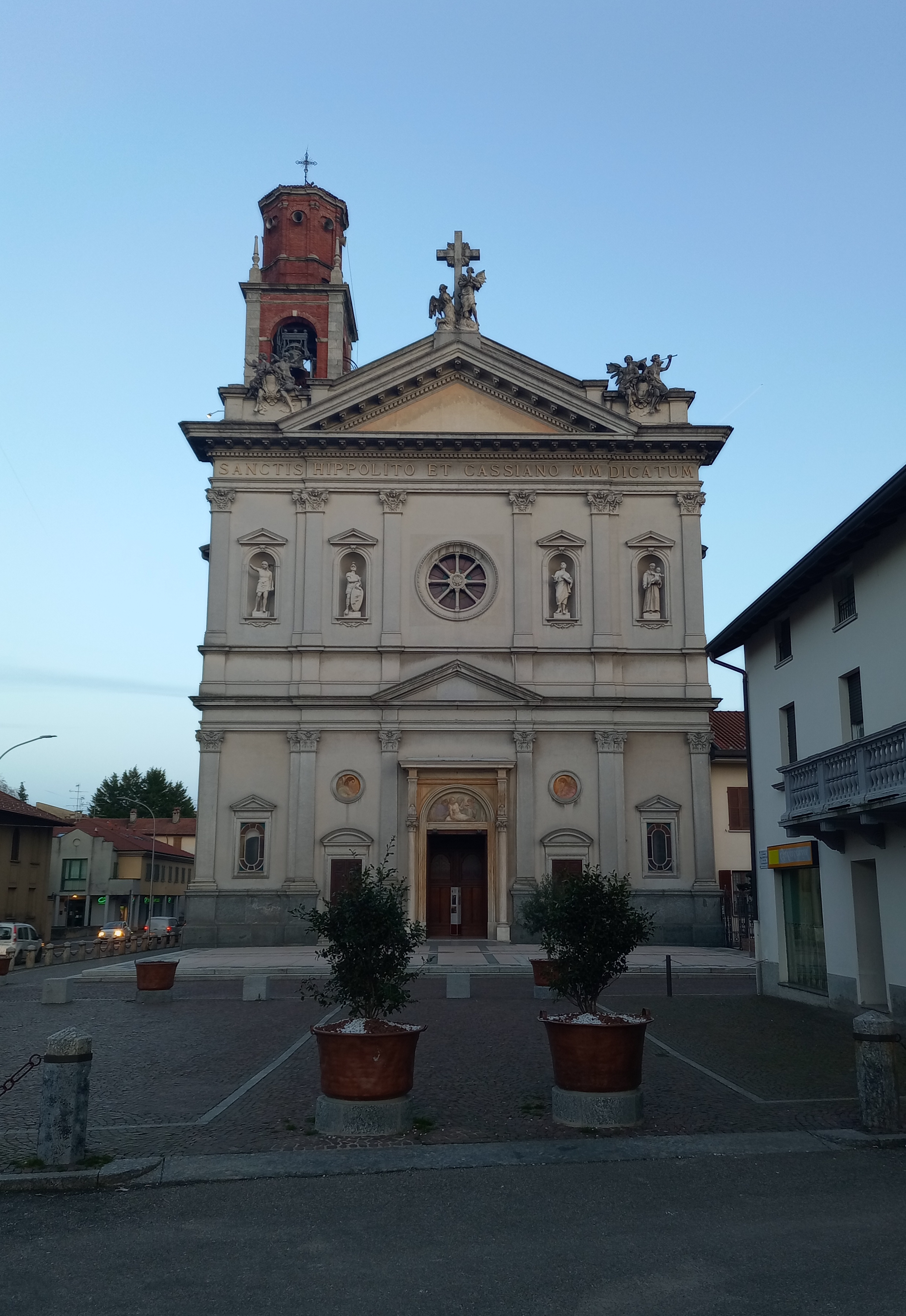
Olgiate Comasco

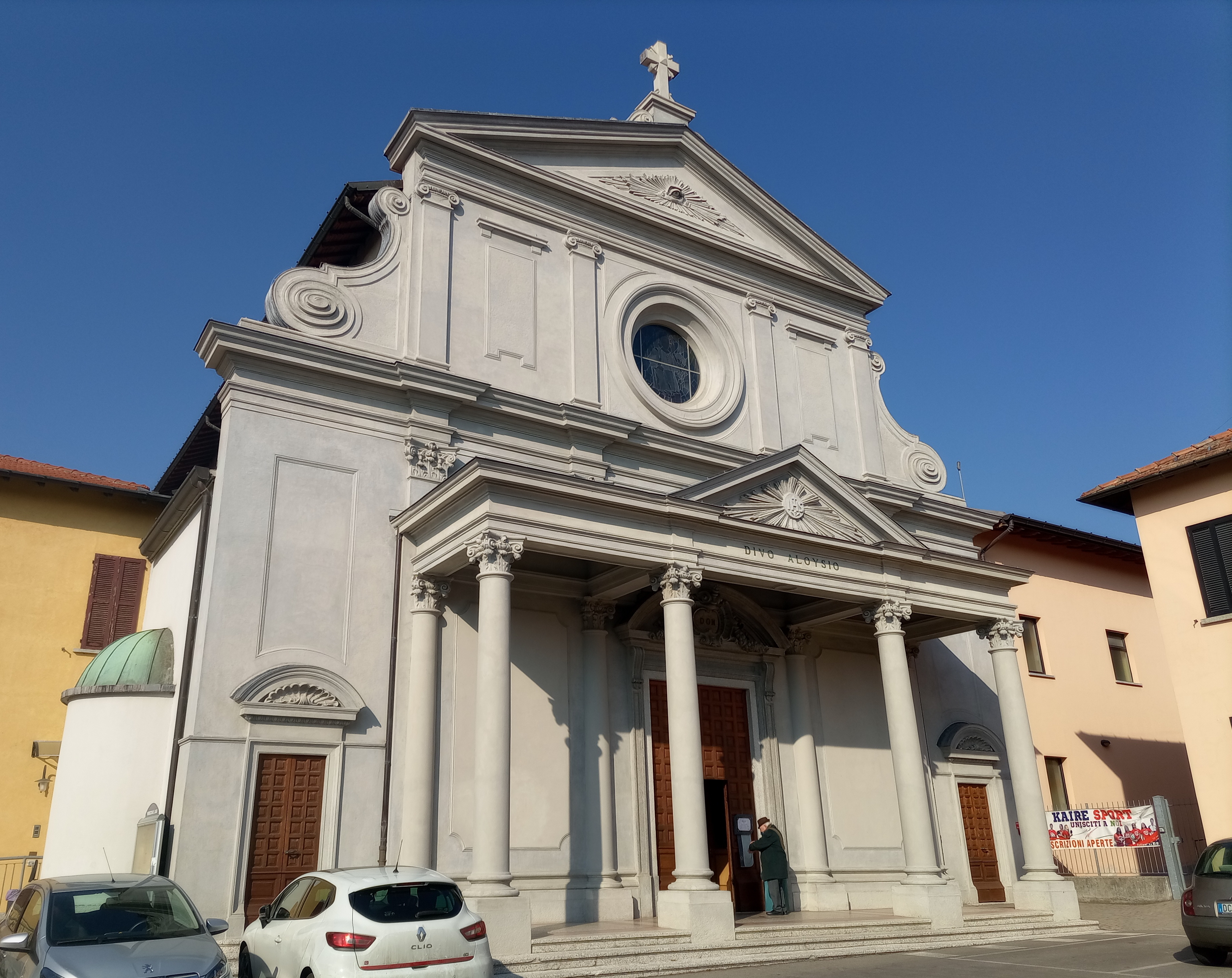
Lurate Caccivio

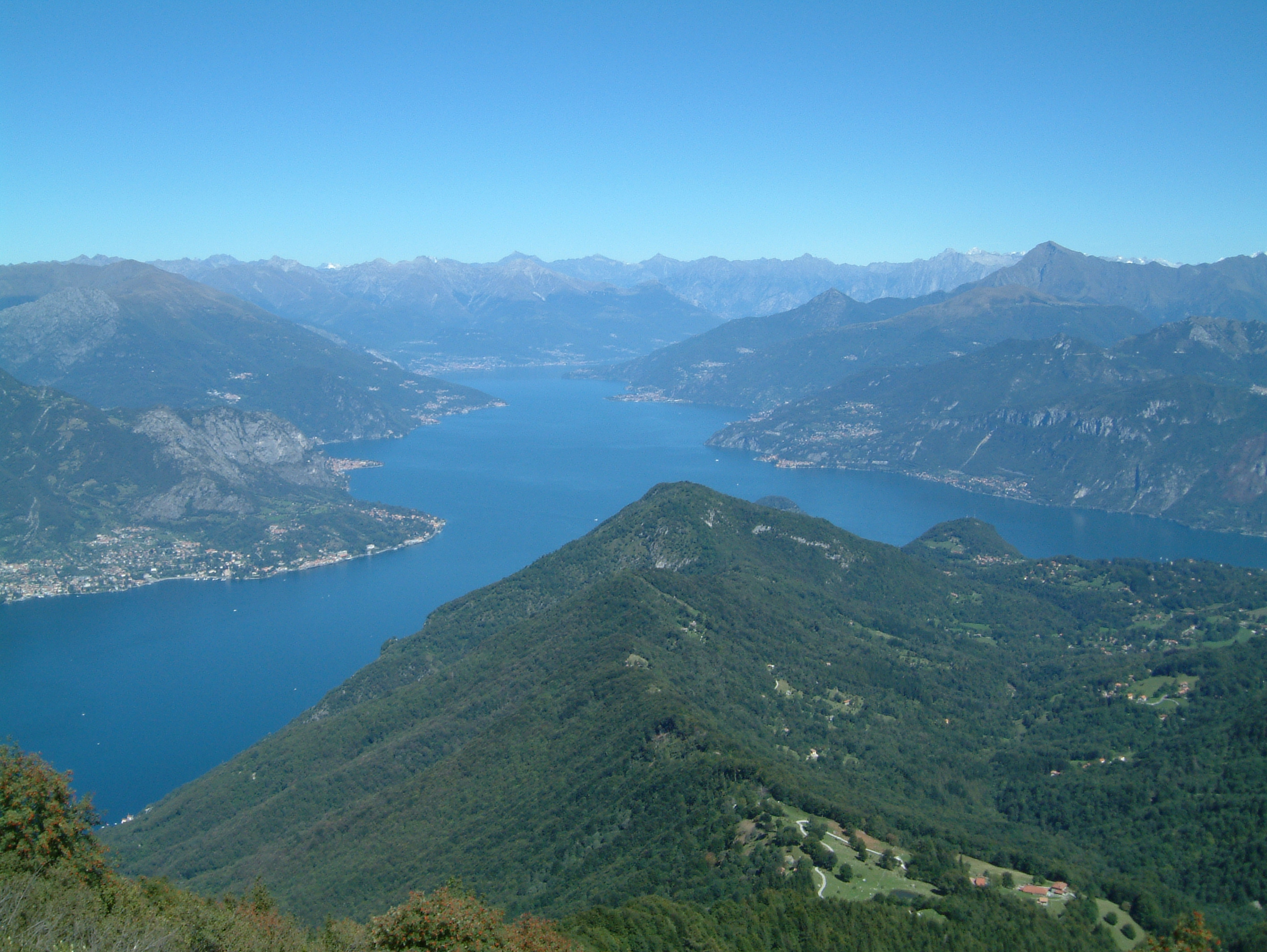
Lake Como

The province has 147 municipalities:

- Albavilla
- Albese con Cassano
- Albiolo
- Alserio
- Alta Valle Intelvi
- Alzate Brianza
- Anzano del Parco
- Appiano Gentile
- Argegno
- Arosio
- Asso
- Barni
- Bellagio
- Bene Lario
- Beregazzo con Figliaro
- Binago
- Bizzarone
- Blessagno
- Blevio
- Bregnano
- Brenna
- Brienno
- Brunate
- Bulgarograsso
- Cabiate
- Cadorago
- Caglio
- Campione d'Italia
- Cantù
- Canzo
- Capiago Intimiano
- Carate Urio
- Carbonate
- Carimate
- Carlazzo
- Carugo
- Caslino d'Erba
- Casnate con Bernate
- Cassina Rizzardi
- Castelmarte
- Castelnuovo Bozzente
- Cavargna
- Centro Valle Intelvi
- Cerano d'Intelvi
- Cermenate
- Cernobbio
- Cirimido
- Claino con Osteno
- Colonno
- Colverde
- Como
- Corrido
- Cremia
- Cucciago
- Cusino
- Dizzasco
- Domaso
- Dongo
- Dosso del Liro
- Erba
- Eupilio
- Faggeto Lario
- Faloppio
- Fenegrò
- Figino Serenza
- Fino Mornasco
- Garzeno
- Gera Lario
- Grandate
- Grandola ed Uniti
- Gravedona ed Uniti
- Griante
- Guanzate
- Inverigo
- Laglio
- Laino
- Lambrugo
- Lasnigo
- Lezzeno
- Limido Comasco
- Lipomo
- Livo
- Locate Varesino
- Lomazzo
- Longone al Segrino
- Luisago
- Lurago d'Erba
- Lurago Marinone
- Lurate Caccivio
- Magreglio
- Mariano Comense
- Maslianico
- Menaggio
- Merone
- Moltrasio
- Monguzzo
- Montano Lucino
- Montemezzo
- Montorfano
- Mozzate
- Musso
- Nesso
- Novedrate
- Olgiate Comasco
- Oltrona di San Mamette
- Orsenigo
- Peglio
- Pianello del Lario
- Pigra
- Plesio
- Pognana Lario
- Ponna
- Ponte Lambro
- Porlezza
- Proserpio
- Pusiano
- Rezzago
- Rodero
- Rovellasca
- Rovello Porro
- Sala Comacina
- San Bartolomeo Val Cavargna
- San Fermo della Battaglia
- San Nazzaro Val Cavargna
- San Siro
- Schignano
- Senna Comasco
- Solbiate con Cagno
- Sorico
- Sormano
- Stazzona
- Tavernerio
- Torno
- Tremezzina
- Trezzone
- Turate
- Uggiate-Trevano
- Val Rezzo
- Valbrona
- Valmorea
- Valsolda
- Veleso
- Veniano
- Vercana
- Vertemate con Minoprio
- Villa Guardia
- Zelbio

== Demographics ==
As of 2026, the population is 598,562, of which 49.4% are male, and 50.6% are female. Minors make up 14.6% of the population, and seniors make up 24.9%.

Historical population
(current borders)

Year	Pop.	±%
1861	223,800	—
1871	233,642	+4.4%
1881	247,258	+5.8%
1901	269,594	+9.0%
1911	295,925	+9.8%
1921	303,259	+2.5%
1931	318,758	+5.1%
1936	321,590	+0.9%

Year	Pop.	±%
1951	361,667	+12.5%
1961	405,975	+12.3%
1971	476,209	+17.3%
1981	511,425	+7.4%
1991	522,147	+2.1%
2001	537,500	+2.9%
2011	586,735	+9.2%
2021	594,941	+1.4%

Source: ISTAT

=== Immigration ===
As of 2025, immigrants make up 12.0% of the population. The 5 largest foreign countries of birth are Romania, Morocco, Albania, Switzerland, and Ukraine.

== Transport ==
=== Motorways ===
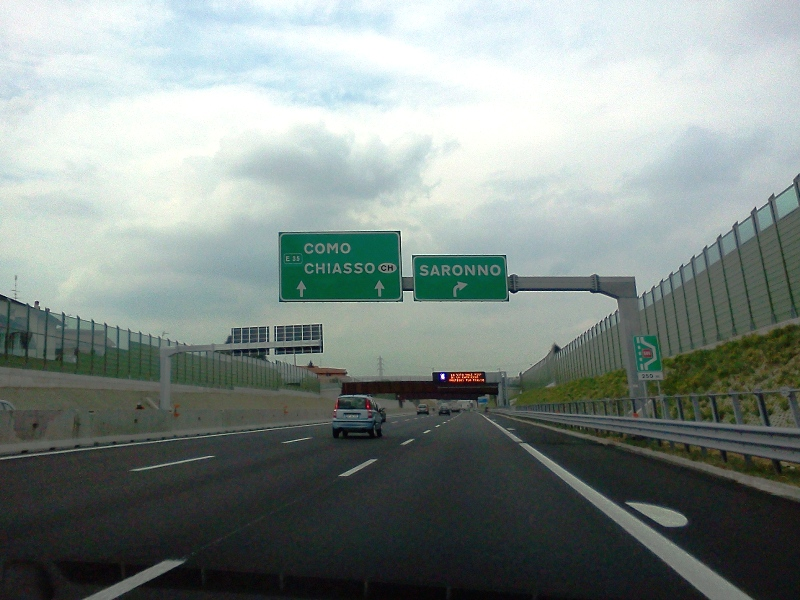
The Autostrada A9, the first motorway built in the world, near Saronno

The province is crossed by the following motorways (in Italian, autostrade):

- Autostrada A9: Lainate-Como
- Autostrada A36: Cassano Magnago-Lentate sul Seveso
- Autostrada A59: Villa Guardia-Albese con Cassano

=== Railway lines ===
- Milan–Chiasso railway
- Saronno–Como railway
- Milan–Asso railway

== See also ==
- Alessandro Volta
- Antonio Sant'Elia
- Giuseppe Terragni
