= Dolores Puthod =

Italian painter

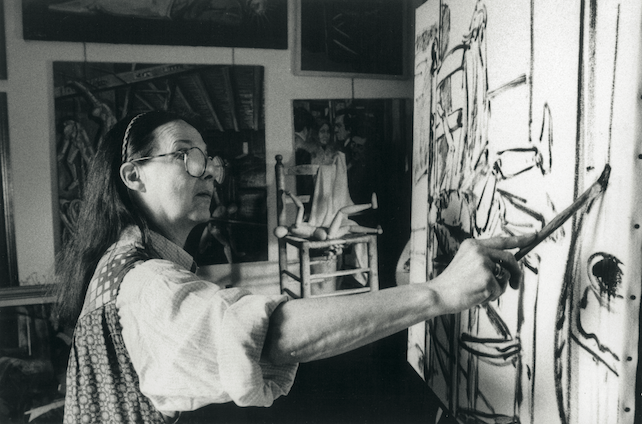
- Dolores Puthod
- Born: 24 June 1934 (age 92); Milan
- Occupation: Painter

Dolores Puthod (born 24 June 1934) is an Italian painter.

== Biography ==
Puthod was born in Milan to Italian-French parents. She joined La Scala in Milan in 1951 as an assistant to Nikolai Benois. She also collaborated with Picasso, Giorgio de Chirico and Alberto Savinio. In 1956, she graduated from the Academy of Fine Arts of Brera, and she continued her activities at La Scala. In the following year she held her first solo exhibition at Circolo della stampa di Milano and in the Centro Culturale Francese di Milano.

In 1978, to mark the bicentenary of the Teatro alla Scala, Puthod created eight works; the resulting exhibition was presented around the world.

The following year, the Vatican, through the Pontifical Council for Interreligious Dialogue, commissioned an oil painting with the theme of ecumenism and depicting the heads of all the most important churches of the world gathered around Paul VI. In 1986, after the Inter-faith Ceremony at Assisi, that painting was defined prophetic.

In 1980, Puthod published, on behalf of UNICEF, a series of six lithographs presented by Cardinal Pignedoli and Mother Teresa of Calcutta.

In 1983, French Prime Minister Pierre Mauroy invited Puthod to exhibit at the Opéra de Lille, the Auditorium Maurice Ravel in Lyon, the Palace of Savoy in Aix-les-Bains, and the House of Culture in Saint-Étienne. The following year, she undertook a traveling exhibition on the Commedia dell'Arte that visited the Charles Dullin Theatre in Chambéry, the Italian Embassy in Paris, the Château de la Batie d'Urfe, the House of Culture in Bourges, the House of Culture of Sochaux, the Auditorium Maurice Ravel in Lyon, and the National Conservatory of Dramatic Art of Paris.

In 1985, Puthod was invited to exhibit at the Institute of Italian Culture Valparaíso in Chile for the city's 450th anniversary; under her leadership the House of Culture of Bourges presented a history of the Commedia dell'arte the same year.

For the 25th anniversary of the Algerian Republic, the Italian Cultural Institute in Algiers invited Puthod to exhibit at the Ibn Khaldoun Theatre. Invited by the Municipality, she exhibited at the Coliseum Theatre and the city of Roubaix made a film inspired by her works.

In 1988, during the Italian Days, Puthod created the official poster and she simultaneously exhibited in various places in the city of Strasbourg. The French government commissioned a large artwork on the occasion of the bicentenary of the French Revolution, exhibited at the Sforza Castle in Milan before being shown in several European cities.

A major retrospective of Puthod's work was organized in 2005 at Villa Mazzotti in Chiari, under the patronage of the Presidency of the Council of Ministers of Italy. In 2006 she was invited to present the exhibit Searching for God (Italian: Cercando Dio) at St. Eugeniakyrkan in Stockholm under the high patronage of the Vatican.

In 2014 the movie ″29200 Puthod, l'altra verità della realtà″ based on Puthod's life, was released. It won an award at the Ariano Film Festival.

In 2015, in conjunction with Expo Milan 2015, the Royal Villa of Monza offered Puthod its theatre for the exhibition ″L'anima del segno teatrale″ on the Commedia dell'arte. In the same year, the town of Lomazzo, where the painter currently lives, dedicated a museum to her located on the first floor of the town hall.

== Works ==
- Magnolia (1951), oil on masonite, 80 x 92 cm
- Nudo di schiena, Consuelo, oil on canvas, 140 x 80 cm
- Infermo, oil on board, 80 x 120 cm
- Incontro ideal nei 200 anni alla Scala (1977), oil on canvas, 4x3 m
- The Spinner (1976), oil on canvas, 130 x 80 cm
- Prima della processione (1996), oil on canvas, 35.3 x 30.3 cm
- Abbandono (1996), oil on canvas, 70 × 70 cm
- Natura morta (1997), oil on canvas, 60 × 70 cm
- The disciples of God (1979), oil on canvas, 4 × 3 m

== Awards ==
Puthod has received several awards including the Bolshoi Theatre Award in Moscow, the Paul Harris Fellows by Rotary International, and the Lorenzo il Magnifico Award.

== Bibliography ==
- Nikolaï Benois, Antonio Ghiringhelli. I grandi dipinti di Dolores Puthod per il Bicentenario del Teatro Alla Scala, 1978, Erser editions.
- Per il sorriso di un Bimbo UNICEF six lithography presented by Mother Teresa of Calcutta, Cardinal Sergio Pignedoli etc. 1980
- Francesco Gioia, inter-religious dialogue in the official teaching of the Catholic Church (ISBN 978-2-85274-300-7) (Coverage: Followers of God, by Dolores Puthod)
- (it) Catalogo Generale delle Opere di Dolores Puthod, vol. 1, Giorgio Mondadori, 1994, 478 p. (ISBN 978-88-374-1379-8).
- (it) Catalogo Generale delle Opere di Dolorès Puthod, vol. 2, Giorgio Mondadori, 2000, 240 p. (ISBN 978-88-374-1648-5)
- (it) Paolo Volponi, Catalogo generale delle opere di Dolores Puthod : dipinti e disegni dal 1948 al 1994, Milano, G. Mondadori, 1994
- (it) Puthod Dolores, Cinque serigrafie di Dolores Puthod – Lombardia Cultural Assets, Art Museum Gallarate, 1975
