= Limido Comasco =

- Comune
- Comune di Limido Comasco
- Location within Italy Location within Lombardy
- Coordinates: 45°41′N 8°59′E
- Country: Italy
- Region: Lombardy
- Province: Province of Como (CO)
- Frazioni: Cascina Restelli

Area
  - Total: 4.5 km^{2} (1.7 sq mi)

Population (Dec. 2004)
  - Total: 2,579
  - Density: 570/km^{2} (1,500/sq mi)
- Time zone: UTC+1 (CET)
  - Summer (DST): UTC+2 (CEST)
- Postal code: 22070
- Dialing code: 031
- Website: Official website

Limido Comasco (locally Limed [ˈliːmet] or Limid [ˈliːmit]) is a comune (municipality) in the Province of Como in the Italian region Lombardy, located about 30 kilometres (19 mi) northwest of Milan and about 15 kilometres (9 mi) southwest of Como. As of 31 December 2004, it had a population of 2,579 and an area of 4.5 km^{2} (1.7 sq mi).

The municipality of Limido Comasco contains the frazione (subdivision) Cascina Restelli.

Limido Comasco borders the municipalities of Cislago, Fenegrò, Lurago Marinone, Mozzate, and Turate.

== Demographic evolution ==
Historical population

Year	Pop.	±%
1861	905	—
1871	960	+6.1%
1881	1,003	+4.5%
1901	1,062	+5.9%
1911	1,153	+8.6%

Year	Pop.	±%
1921	1,204	+4.4%
1931	1,189	−1.2%
1936	1,192	+0.3%
1951	1,228	+3.0%
1961	1,275	+3.8%

Year	Pop.	±%
1971	1,420	+11.4%
1981	1,811	+27.5%
1991	2,045	+12.9%
2001	2,265	+10.8%

Source: Data from ISTAT
