= Faggeto Lario =

- Comune
- Comune di Faggeto Lario
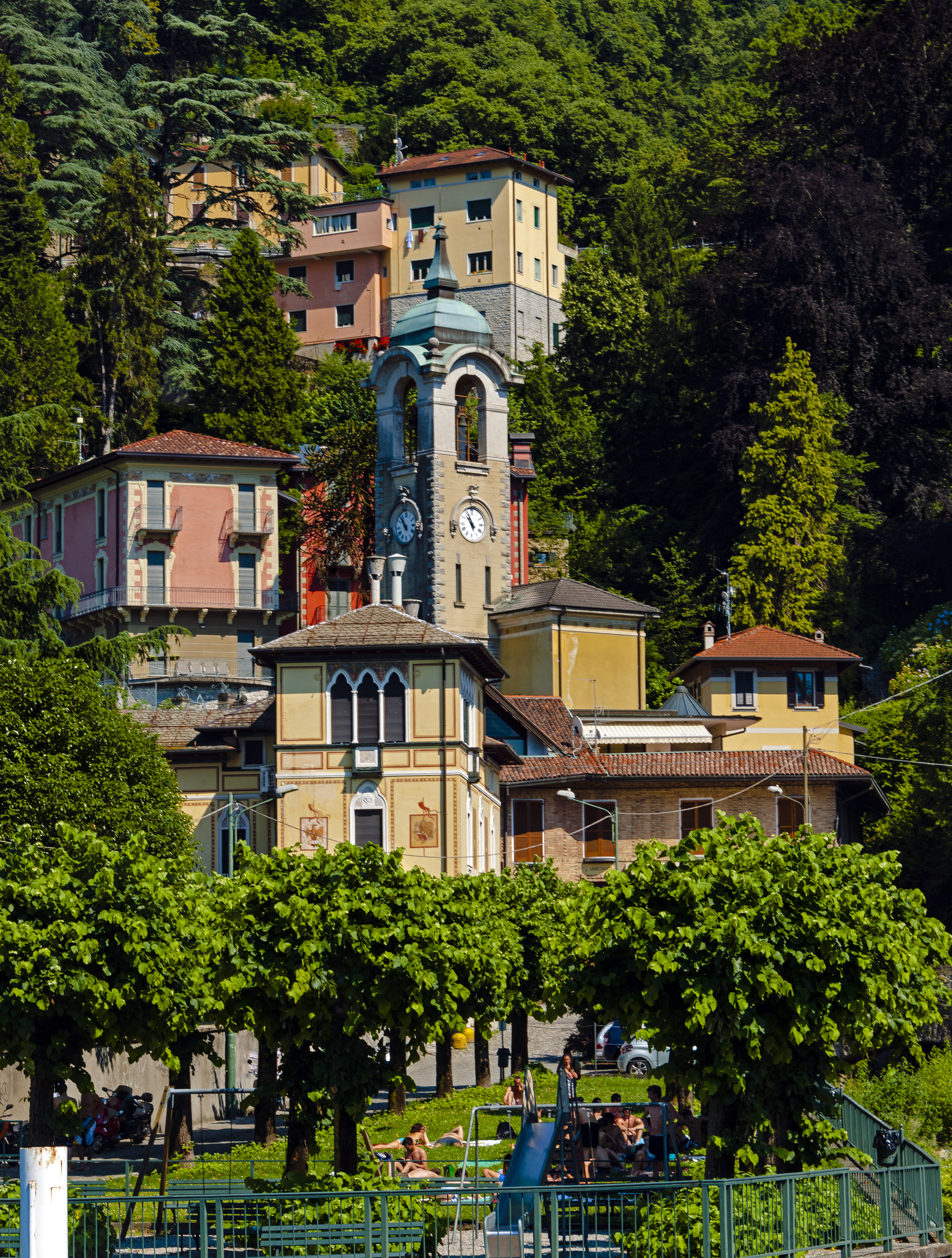
- Central Faggeto Lario from a ferry up the lake

- Location within Italy Location within Lombardy
- Coordinates: 45°51′N 9°10′E
- Country: Italy
- Region: Lombardy
- Province: Como (CO)

Government
  - Mayor: Raffaele Ceresa

Area
  - Total: 17.52 km^{2} (6.76 sq mi)
- Elevation: 533 m (1,749 ft)

Population (Dec. 2004)
  - Total: 1,227
  - Density: 70.03/km^{2} (181.4/sq mi)
- Demonym: Faggetani
- Time zone: UTC+1 (CET)
  - Summer (DST): UTC+2 (CEST)
- Postal code: 22020
- Dialing code: 031
- Website: Official website

Faggeto Lario (Comasco: Fasgée [faˈʒeː]) is a comune (municipality) in the Province of Como in the Italian region of Lombardy, located about 45 kilometres (28 mi) north of Milan and about 7 kilometres (4 mi) northeast of Como.

Faggeto Lario borders the following municipalities: Albavilla, Albese con Cassano, Caglio, Carate Urio, Caslino d'Erba, Erba, Laglio, Nesso, Pognana Lario, Tavernerio, Torno.
