= Bulgarograsso =

Bulgarograsso Bulgor (Lombard)
- Comune
- Comune di Bulgarograsso
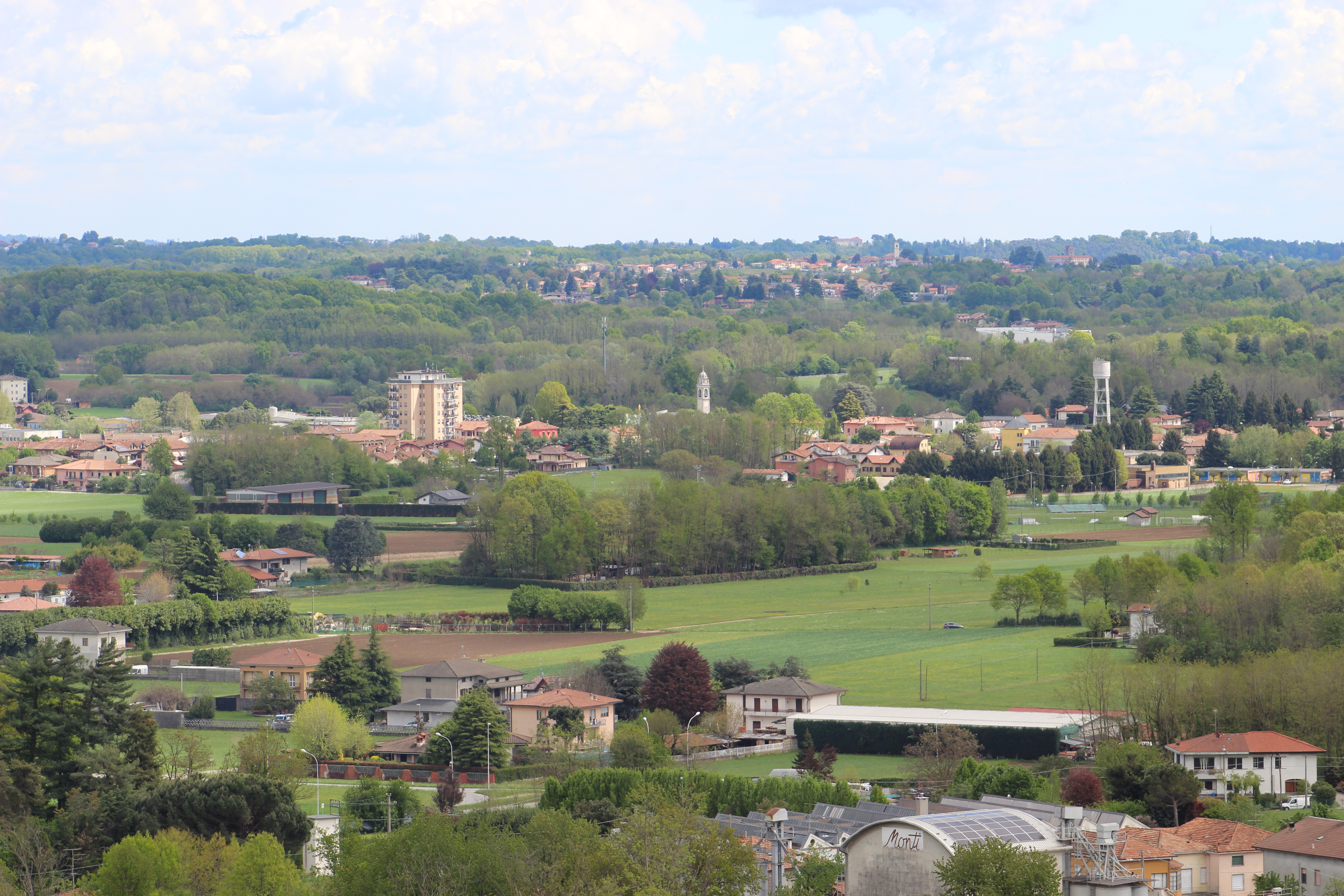
- View of Bulgarograsso

- Location within Italy Location within Lombardy
- Coordinates: 45°45′N 9°0′E
- Country: Italy
- Region: Lombardy
- Province: Province of Como (CO)

Area
  - Total: 3.8 km^{2} (1.5 sq mi)

Population (Dec. 2004)
  - Total: 3,283
  - Density: 860/km^{2} (2,200/sq mi)
- Demonym: Bulgaresi
- Time zone: UTC+1 (CET)
  - Summer (DST): UTC+2 (CEST)
- Postal code: 22070
- Dialing code: 031

Bulgarograsso (Comasco: Bulgor [ˈbylɡur]) is a comune (municipality) in the Province of Como in the Italian region Lombardy, located about 35 kilometres (22 mi) northwest of Milan and about 10 kilometres (6 mi) southwest of Como. As of 31 December 2004, it had a population of 3,283 and an area of 3.8 square kilometres (1.5 mi^{2}).

Bulgarograsso borders the following municipalities: Appiano Gentile, Cassina Rizzardi, Guanzate, Lurate Caccivio, Villa Guardia.

== Demographic evolution ==
Historical population

| Year | Pop. | ±% |
|---|---|---|
| 1861 | 766 | — |
| 1871 | 768 | +0.3% |
| 1881 | 934 | +21.6% |
| 1901 | 1,169 | +25.2% |
| 1911 | 1,173 | +0.3% |

| Year | Pop. | ±% |
|---|---|---|
| 1921 | 1,184 | +0.9% |
| 1931 | 1,287 | +8.7% |
| 1936 | 1,379 | +7.1% |
| 1951 | 1,455 | +5.5% |
| 1961 | 1,721 | +18.3% |

| Year | Pop. | ±% |
|---|---|---|
| 1971 | 2,107 | +22.4% |
| 1981 | 2,342 | +11.2% |
| 1991 | 2,691 | +14.9% |
| 2001 | 2,989 | +11.1% |

Source: Data from ISTAT
