= Gerenzano =

- Comune
- Comune di Gerenzano
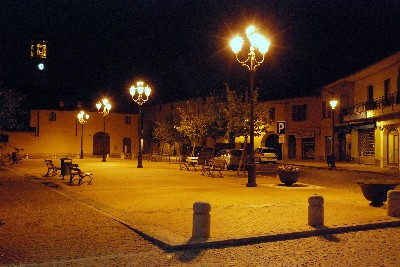
- Piazza XXV Aprile, Gerenzano

- Coat of arms

- Location within Italy Location within Lombardy
- Coordinates: 45°38′N 9°0′E
- Country: Italy
- Region: Lombardy
- Province: Varese (VA)

Government
  - Mayor: Stefania Castagnoli

Area
  - Total: 9.8 km^{2} (3.8 sq mi)
- Elevation: 226 m (741 ft)

Population (31 January 2009)
  - Total: 10,098
  - Density: 1,000/km^{2} (2,700/sq mi)
- Demonym: Gerenzanesi
- Time zone: UTC+1 (CET)
  - Summer (DST): UTC+2 (CEST)
- Postal code: 21040
- Dialing code: 02
- Patron saint: Sts. Peter and Paul
- Saint day: April 7
- Website: Official website

Gerenzano is a comune (municipality) in the Province of Varese in the Italian region Lombardy, located about 25 kilometres (16 mi) northwest of Milan and about 25 kilometres (16 mi) southeast of Varese.

Gerenzano borders the following municipalities: Cislago, Rescaldina, Rovello Porro, Saronno, Turate, Uboldo.

== Transports ==
Gerenzano is served by train transportation with Gerenzano-Turate station, situated on the line connecting Varese and Laveno Mombello to Milan. This line is operated by FNM.

== Education and culture ==
Gerenzano has two public primary schools (one entitled to Pope Giovanni XXIII and one to G.P. Clerici) and one public middle school (entitled to the Italian scientist Enrico Fermi). There are no high schools in the comune.

A public library is also present in the territory, along with a public auditorium.

== Sports ==
In Gerenzano are located the following sports teams:

- Gruppo Sportivo Gerenzano, Twirling
- Polisportiva Salus Gerenzano, Football, Volleyball, Basketball and other activities
- A.S.D Gerenzanese Calcio, Football
