= Villa Guardia =

- Comune
- Comune di Villa Guardia
- Coat of arms

- Location within Italy Location within Lombardy
- Coordinates: 45°47′N 9°1′E
- Country: Italy
- Region: Lombardy
- Province: Como (CO)
- Frazioni: Maccio, Civello, Masano, Brugo, Mosino

Government
  - Mayor: Paolo Veronelli

Area
  - Total: 7.87 km^{2} (3.04 sq mi)
- Elevation: 350 m (1,150 ft)

Population (31 March 2017)
  - Total: 8,054
  - Density: 1,020/km^{2} (2,650/sq mi)
- Demonym: Villaguardiesi
- Time zone: UTC+1 (CET)
  - Summer (DST): UTC+2 (CEST)
- Postal code: 22079
- Dialing code: 031
- Website: Official website

Villa Guardia (Brianzöö: [ˈʋila ˈɡwaːrdja]) is a comune (municipality) in the Province of Como in the Italian region Lombardy, located about 35 kilometres (22 mi) northwest of Milan and about 6 kilometres (4 mi) southwest of Como.

Villa Guardia borders the following municipalities: Bulgarograsso, Cassina Rizzardi, Colverde, Grandate, Luisago, Lurate Caccivio, Montano Lucino.
