= Longone al Segrino =

- Comune
- Comune di Longone al Segrino
- Location within Italy Location within Lombardy
- Coordinates: 45°49′N 9°15′E
- Country: Italy
- Region: Lombardy
- Province: Province of Como (CO)
- Frazioni: Morchiuso

Area
  - Total: 1.5 km^{2} (0.58 sq mi)
- Elevation: 368 m (1,207 ft)

Population (Dec. 2004)
  - Total: 1,543
  - Density: 1,000/km^{2} (2,700/sq mi)
- Time zone: UTC+1 (CET)
  - Summer (DST): UTC+2 (CEST)
- Postal code: 22030
- Dialing code: 031

Longone al Segrino (Brianzöö: Lungun [lũˈɡũː]) is a small village and comune between Como and Lecco in the province of Como in Lombardy, Italy. It is located about 40 kilometres (25 mi) north of Milan and about 13 kilometres (8 mi) east of Como. It is known for its lake, an unusual case of an intact ecosystem. As of 31 December 2004, it had a population of 1,543 and an area of 1.5 square kilometres (0.58 mi^{2}).

The municipality of Longone al Segrino contains the frazione (subdivision) Morchiuso.

Longone al Segrino borders the following municipalities: Canzo, Erba, Eupilio, and Proserpio.

== Demographic evolution ==
Historical population

| Year | Pop. | ±% |
|---|---|---|
| 1861 | 500 | — |
| 1871 | 511 | +2.2% |
| 1881 | 482 | −5.7% |
| 1901 | 516 | +7.1% |
| 1911 | 451 | −12.6% |

| Year | Pop. | ±% |
|---|---|---|
| 1921 | 481 | +6.7% |
| 1931 | 439 | −8.7% |
| 1936 | 423 | −3.6% |
| 1951 | 530 | +25.3% |
| 1961 | 718 | +35.5% |

| Year | Pop. | ±% |
|---|---|---|
| 1971 | 886 | +23.4% |
| 1981 | 1,157 | +30.6% |
| 1991 | 1,314 | +13.6% |
| 2001 | 1,455 | +10.7% |

Source: Data from ISTAT
