= Veniano =

Veniano Venian (Lombard)
- Comune
- Comune di Veniano
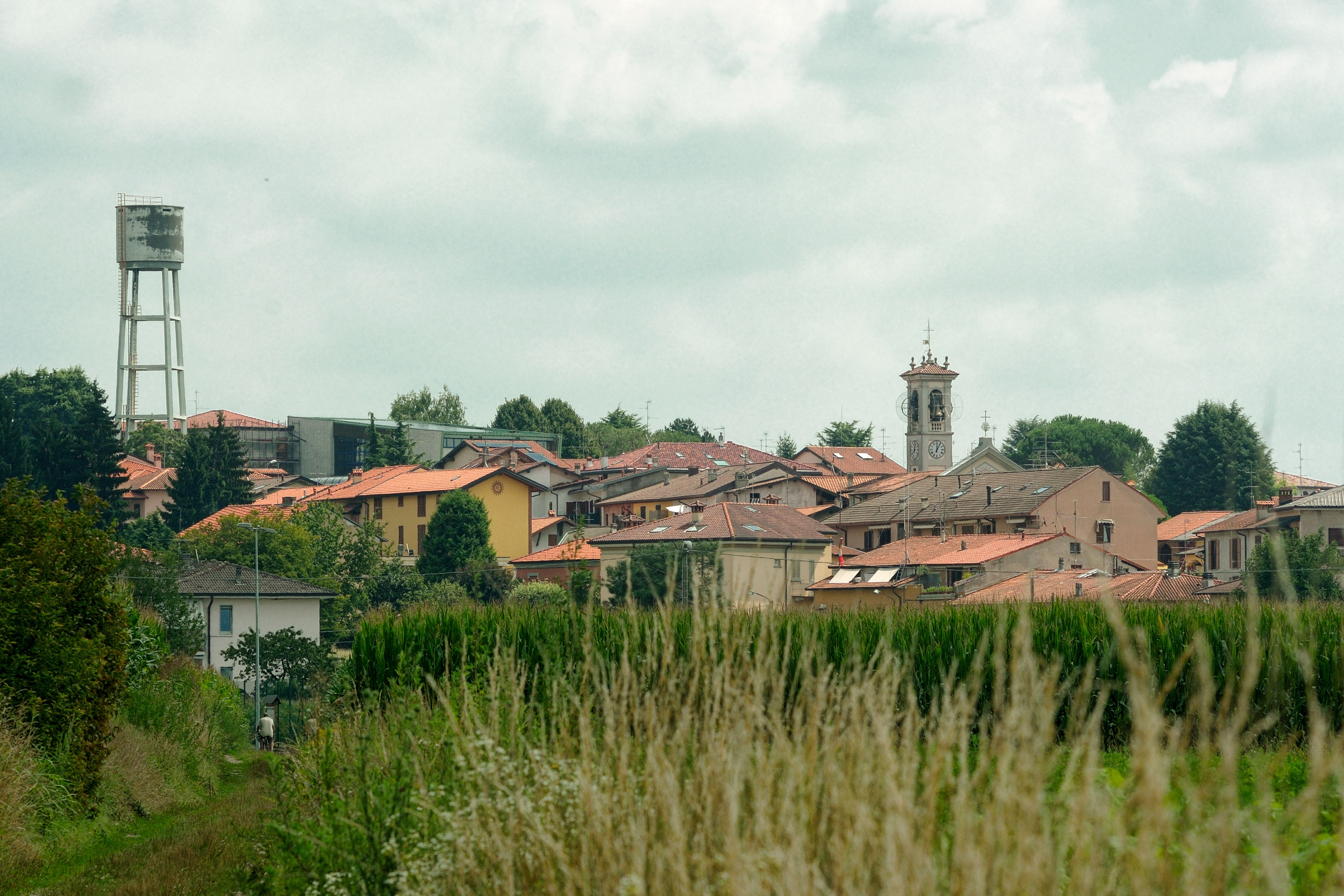
- View of Veniano

- Location within Italy Location within Lombardy
- Coordinates: 45°43′N 8°59′E
- Country: Italy
- Region: Lombardy
- Province: Province of Como (CO)

Area
  - Total: 3.2 km^{2} (1.2 sq mi)

Population (Dec. 2010)
  - Total: 2,859
  - Density: 890/km^{2} (2,300/sq mi)
- Demonym: Venianesi
- Time zone: UTC+1 (CET)
  - Summer (DST): UTC+2 (CEST)
- Postal code: 22070
- Dialing code: 031
- Website: Official website

Veniano (Comasco: Venian [ʋeˈnjãː]) is a comune (municipality) in the Province of Como in the Italian region Lombardy, located about 30 kilometres (19 mi) northwest of Milan and about 14 kilometres (9 mi) southwest of Como. As of 31 December 2010, it had a population of 2,859 and an area of 3.2 square kilometres (1.2 mi^{2}).

Veniano borders the following municipalities: Appiano Gentile, Fenegrò, Guanzate, Lurago Marinone.

== Population history ==
Historical population

Year	Pop.	±%
1861	634	—
1871	716	+12.9%
1881	783	+9.4%
1901	689	−12.0%
1911	798	+15.8%

Year	Pop.	±%
1921	870	+9.0%
1931	828	−4.8%
1936	807	−2.5%
1951	889	+10.2%
1961	1,008	+13.4%

Year	Pop.	±%
1971	1,339	+32.8%
1981	1,829	+36.6%
1991	2,144	+17.2%
2001	2,334	+8.9%

Source: Data from ISTAT
