= Turate =

Turate Turaa (Lombard)
- Comune
- Comune di Turate
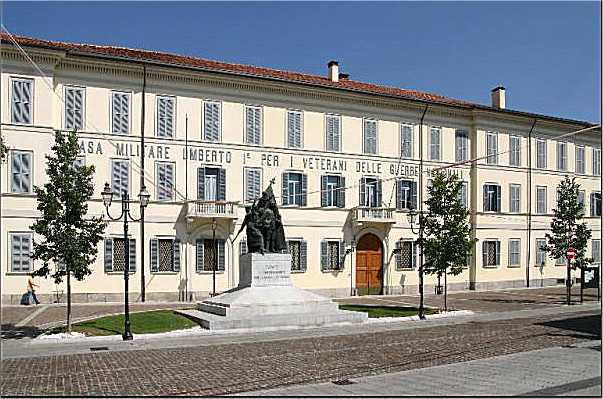
- Casa Militare of Turate

- Location within Italy Location within Lombardy
- Coordinates: 45°39′20″N 9°0′6″E
- Country: Italy
- Region: Lombardy
- Province: Como (CO)
- Frazioni: Santa Maria, Mascazza, Piatti, Fagnana

Government
  - Mayor: Alberto Oleari

Area
  - Total: 10.1 km^{2} (3.9 sq mi)
- Elevation: 240 m (790 ft)

Population (31 December 2017)
  - Total: 9,506
  - Density: 941/km^{2} (2,440/sq mi)
- Demonym: Turatesi
- Time zone: UTC+1 (CET)
  - Summer (DST): UTC+2 (CEST)
- Postal code: 22078
- Dialing code: 02
- Website: Official website

Turate (Comasco, Varesino: Turaa [tyˈraː]) is a comune (municipality) in the Province of Como in the Italian region Lombardy, located about 25 kilometres (16 mi) northwest of Milan and about 25 kilometres (16 mi) southwest of Como.

Turate borders the following municipalities: Cirimido, Cislago, Fenegrò, Gerenzano, Limido Comasco, Lomazzo, Rovello Porro.
