= Proserpio =

Proserpio Presèrp (Lombard)
- Comune
- Comune di Proserpio
- Location within Italy Location within Lombardy
- Coordinates: 45°49′N 9°15′E
- Country: Italy
- Region: Lombardy
- Province: Province of Como (CO)

Area
  - Total: 2.4 km^{2} (0.93 sq mi)
- Elevation: 450 m (1,480 ft)

Population (Dec. 2004)
  - Total: 942
  - Density: 390/km^{2} (1,000/sq mi)
- Demonym: ursitt (west.lmo. traditional gentilic)
- Time zone: UTC+1 (CET)
  - Summer (DST): UTC+2 (CEST)
- Postal code: 22030
- Dialing code: 031

Proserpio (Brianzöö: Presèrp) is a comune (municipality) in the Province of Como in the Italian region Lombardy, located about 40 kilometres (25 mi) north of Milan and about 13 kilometres (8 mi) east of Como. As of 31 December 2004, it had a population of 942 and an area of 2.4 square kilometres (0.93 mi^{2}). The name comes from the Roman goddess Proserpina.

Proserpio borders the following municipalities: Canzo, Castelmarte, Erba, Longone al Segrino.

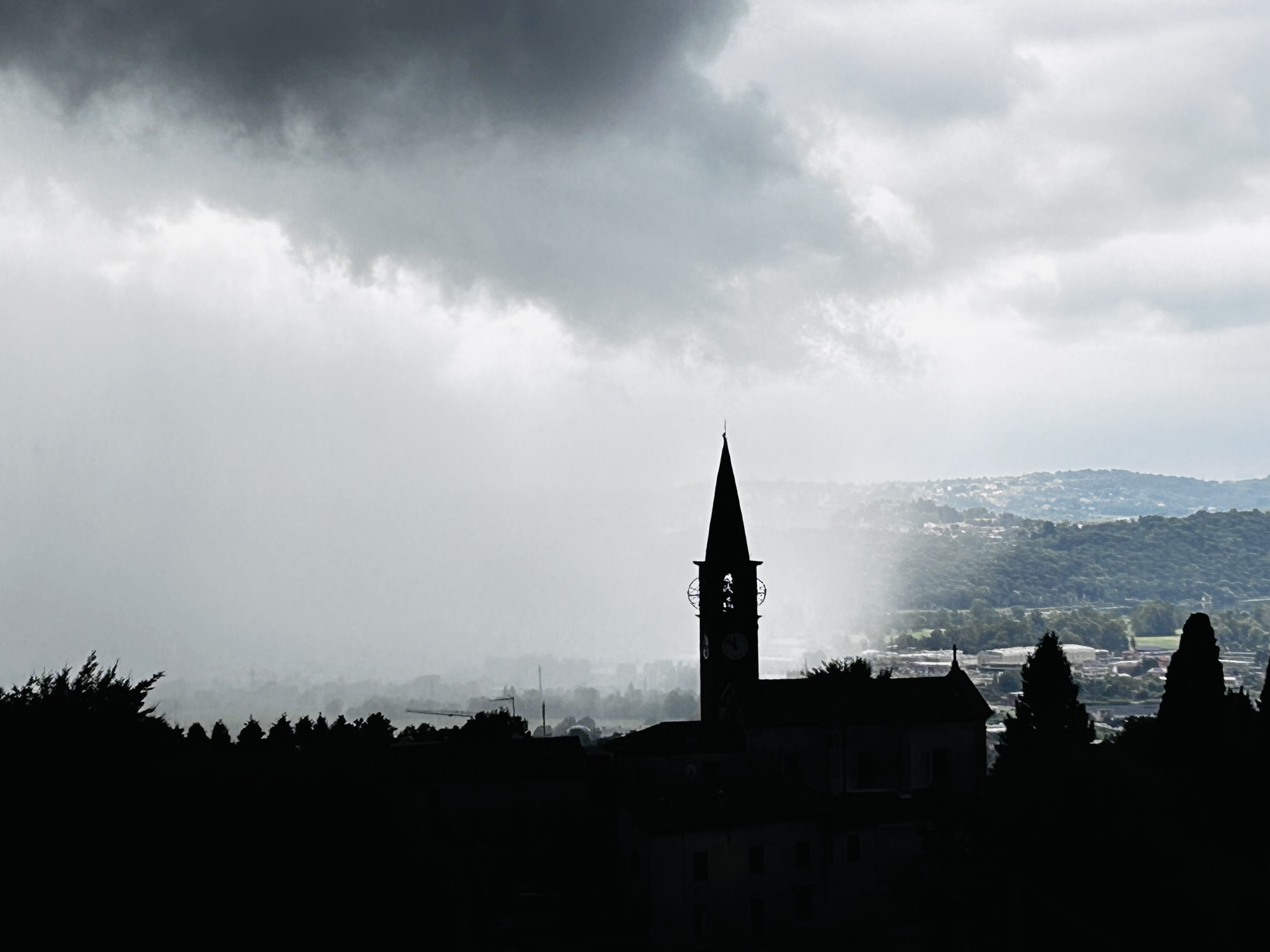
Proserpio - Church of S. Donnino

== Demographic evolution ==
Historical population

Year	Pop.	±%
1861	556	—
1871	536	−3.6%
1881	543	+1.3%
1901	514	−5.3%
1911	535	+4.1%

Year	Pop.	±%
1921	527	−1.5%
1931	516	−2.1%
1936	510	−1.2%
1951	493	−3.3%
1961	527	+6.9%

Year	Pop.	±%
1971	594	+12.7%
1981	691	+16.3%
1991	836	+21.0%
2001	910	+8.9%

Source: Data from ISTAT
