= Bizzarone =

Bizzarone Bizzarun (Lombard)
- Comune
- Comune di Bizzarone
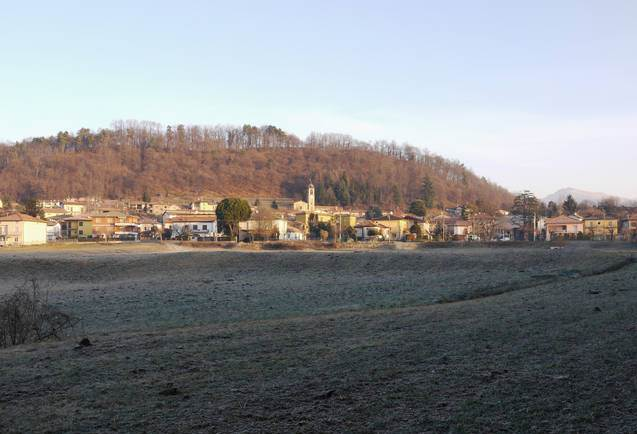
- View of Bizzarone

- Location within Italy Location within Lombardy
- Coordinates: 45°50′N 8°57′E
- Country: Italy
- Region: Lombardy
- Province: Como (CO)

Government
  - Mayor: Guido Bertocchi

Area
  - Total: 2.67 km^{2} (1.03 sq mi)
- Elevation: 436 m (1,430 ft)

Population (31 March 2017)
  - Total: 1,599
  - Density: 599/km^{2} (1,550/sq mi)
- Demonym: Bizzaronesi
- Time zone: UTC+1 (CET)
  - Summer (DST): UTC+2 (CEST)
- Postal code: 22020
- Dialing code: 031
- Patron saint: St. Evasius
- Website: Official website

Bizzarone (Comasco: Bizzarun [bidzaˈrũː]) is a comune (municipality) in the Province of Como in the Italian region Lombardy, located about 45 kilometres (28 mi) northwest of Milan and about 11 kilometres (7 mi) west of Como, on the border with Switzerland.

Bizzarone borders the following municipalities: Mendrisio (Switzerland), Novazzano (Switzerland), Rodero, Stabio (Switzerland), Uggiate con Ronago, Valmorea.
