= Lurate Caccivio =

Lurate Caccivio Luraa Casciv (Lombard)
- Comune
- Comune di Lurate Caccivio
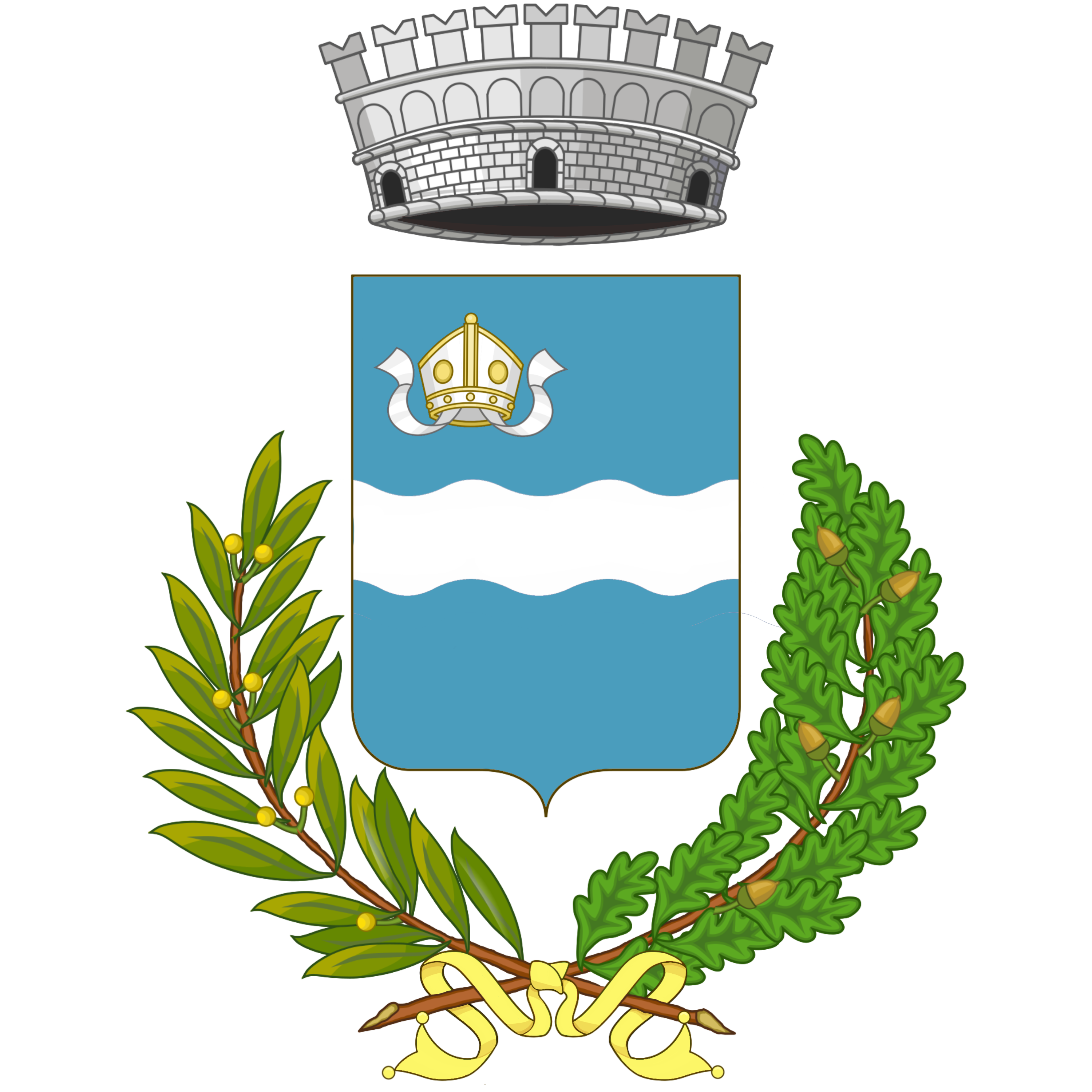
- Coat of arms

- Location within Italy Location within Lombardy
- Coordinates: 45°46′N 9°0′E
- Country: Italy
- Region: Lombardy
- Province: Como (CO)
- Frazioni: Lurate, Caccivio, Castello

Government
  - Mayor: Serena Arrighi

Area
  - Total: 5.93 km^{2} (2.29 sq mi)
- Elevation: 330 m (1,080 ft)

Population (30 september 2017)
  - Total: 9,893
  - Density: 1,670/km^{2} (4,320/sq mi)
- Demonym(s): Luratesi (from Lurate), Cacciviesi (from Caccivio), Castellesi (from Castello)
- Time zone: UTC+1 (CET)
  - Summer (DST): UTC+2 (CEST)
- Postal code: 22075
- Dialing code: 031
- Website: Official website

Lurate Caccivio (Comasco: Luraa Casciv [lyˈraː kaˈʃiːf]) is a comune (municipality) in the Province of Como in the Italian region Lombardy, located about 35 kilometres (22 mi) northwest of Milan and about 9 kilometres (6 mi) southwest of Como.

Lurate Caccivio borders the following municipalities: Appiano Gentile, Beregazzo con Figliaro, Bulgarograsso, Colverde, Olgiate Comasco, Oltrona di San Mamette, Villa Guardia.

== Twin towns ==
Lurate Caccivio is twinned with:

- Cerchiara di Calabria, Italy
- Fusine, Italy
