= Cadorago =

Cadorago Cadoragh (Lombard)
- Comune
- Comune di Cadorago
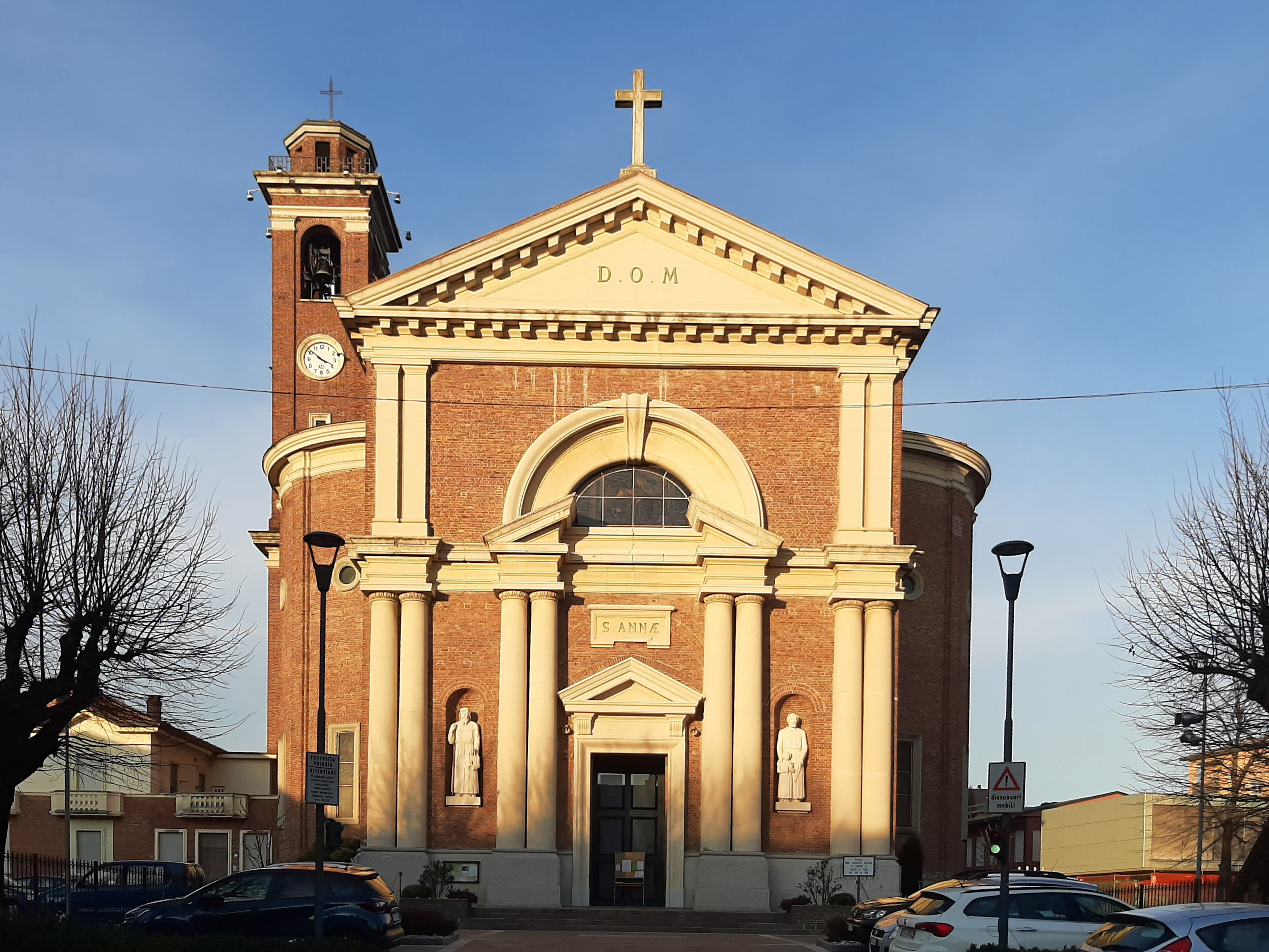

- Location within Italy Location within Lombardy
- Coordinates: 45°43′N 9°2′E
- Country: Italy
- Region: Lombardy
- Province: Como (CO)
- Frazioni: Bulgorello, Caslino al Piano

Government
  - Mayor: Paolo Clerici

Area
  - Total: 7.19 km^{2} (2.78 sq mi)
- Elevation: 313 m (1,027 ft)

Population (30 September 2017)
  - Total: 7,953
  - Density: 1,110/km^{2} (2,860/sq mi)
- Demonym: Cadoraghesi
- Time zone: UTC+1 (CET)
  - Summer (DST): UTC+2 (CEST)
- Postal code: 22071
- Dialing code: 031
- Website: Official website

Cadorago (Comasco: Cadoragh [kaduˈraːk]) is a comune (municipality) in the Province of Como in the Italian region Lombardy, located about 30 kilometres (19 mi) northwest of Milan and about 12 kilometres (7 mi) southwest of Como.

Cadorago borders the following municipalities: Bregnano, Fino Mornasco, Guanzate, Lomazzo, Vertemate con Minoprio.
