= Maslianico =

Maslianico Maslianigh (Lombard)
- Comune
- Comune di Maslianico
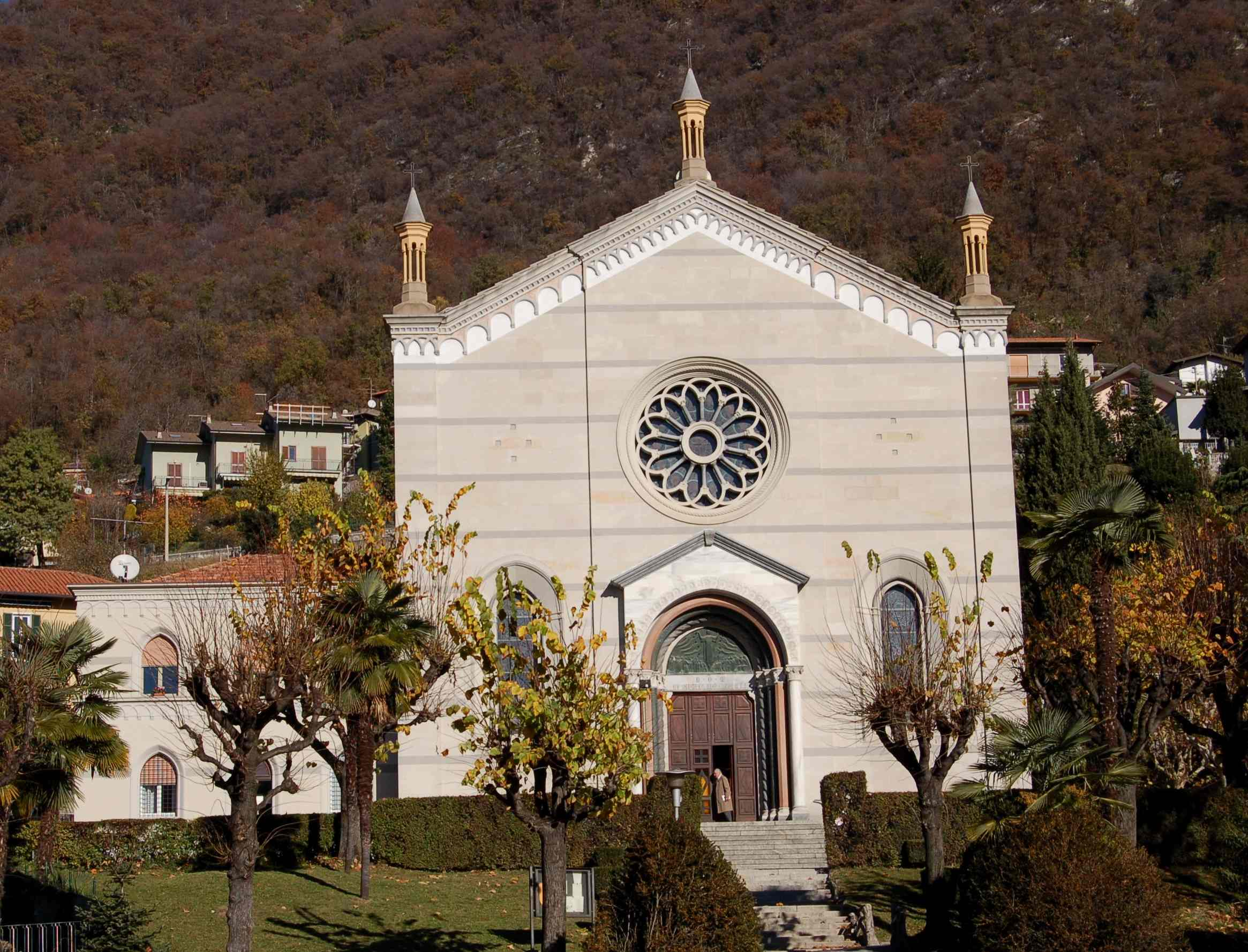

- Location within Italy Location within Lombardy
- Coordinates: 45°51′N 9°2′E
- Country: Italy
- Region: Lombardy
- Province: Como (CO)

Government
  - Mayor: Tiziano Citterio

Area
  - Total: 1.3 km^{2} (0.50 sq mi)
- Elevation: 255 m (837 ft)

Population (Dec. 2004)
  - Total: 3,469
  - Density: 2,700/km^{2} (6,900/sq mi)
- Demonym: Maslianichesi
- Time zone: UTC+1 (CET)
  - Summer (DST): UTC+2 (CEST)
- Postal code: 22026
- Dialing code: 031
- Website: Official website

Maslianico (Italian: [maˈzljaːniko]; Comasco: Maslianigh [maˈzljaːnik]) is a comune (municipality) in the Province of Como in the Italian region Lombardy, located about 45 kilometres (28 mi) north of Milan and about 5 kilometres (3 mi) northwest of Como, on the border with Switzerland.

Maslianico borders the following municipalities: Cernobbio, Como, Vacallo (Switzerland).
