= Valmorea =

Valmorea Valmuréa (Lombard)
- Comune
- Comune di Valmorea
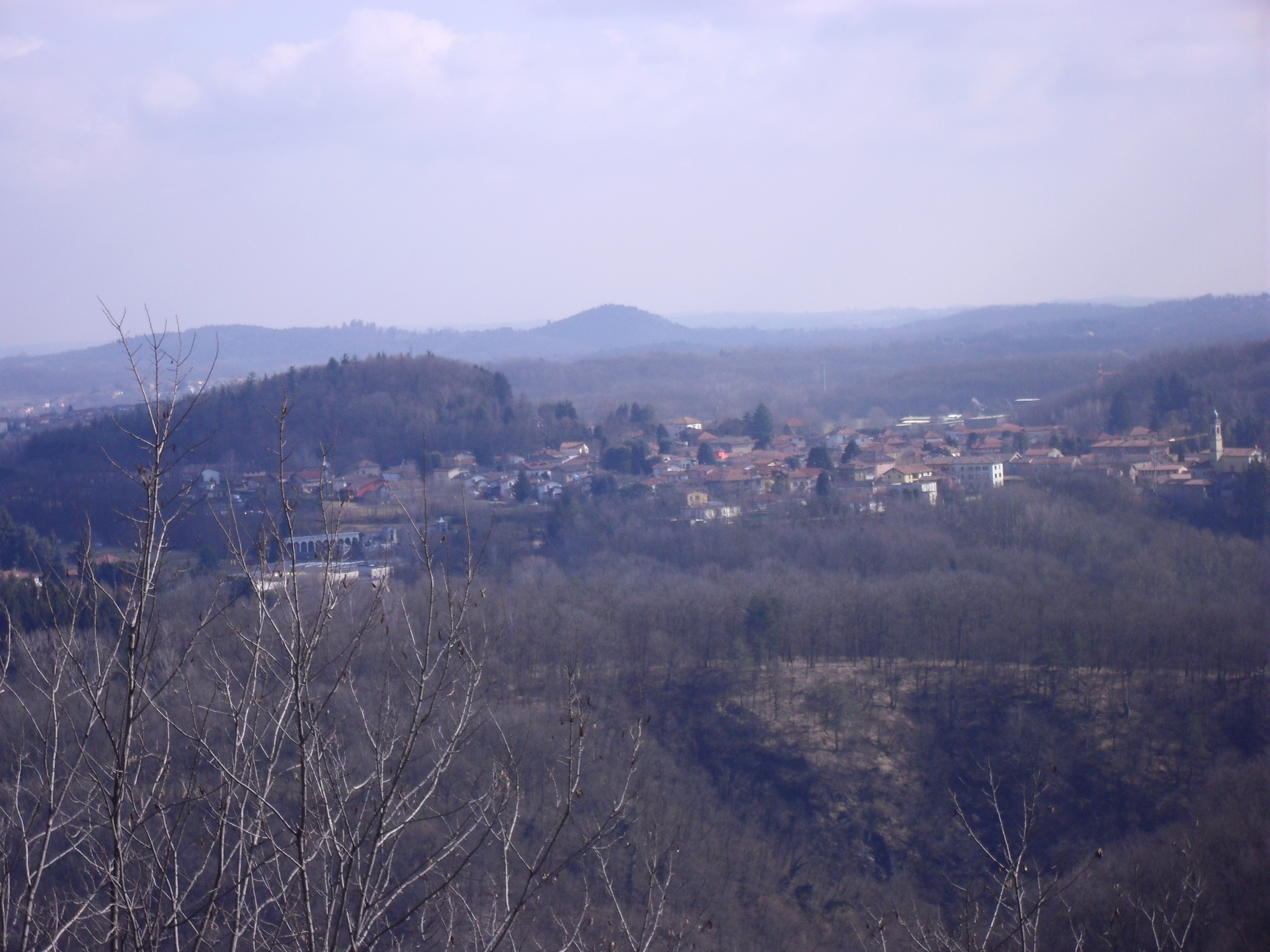
- View of Casanova Lanza, one of the two settlements forming the comune of Valmorea.

- Location within Italy Location within Lombardy
- Coordinates: 45°49′N 8°56′E
- Country: Italy
- Region: Lombardy
- Province: Como (CO)

Government
  - Mayor: Mauro Simoncini

Area
  - Total: 3.13 km^{2} (1.21 sq mi)
- Elevation: 400 m (1,300 ft)

Population (31 March 2017)
  - Total: 2,666
  - Density: 852/km^{2} (2,210/sq mi)
- Demonym: Valmoresi
- Time zone: UTC+1 (CET)
  - Summer (DST): UTC+2 (CEST)
- Postal code: 22070
- Dialing code: 031
- Website: Official website

Valmorea (Comasco: Valmuréa) is a comune (municipality) in the Province of Como in the Italian region Lombardy, located about 45 kilometres (28 mi) northwest of Milan and about 12 kilometres (7 mi) west of Como.

Valmorea borders the following municipalities: Albiolo, Bizzarone, Cagno, Rodero, Uggiate-Trevano.
