= Cirimido =

Cirimido Scirimed (Lombard)
- Comune
- Comune di Cirimido
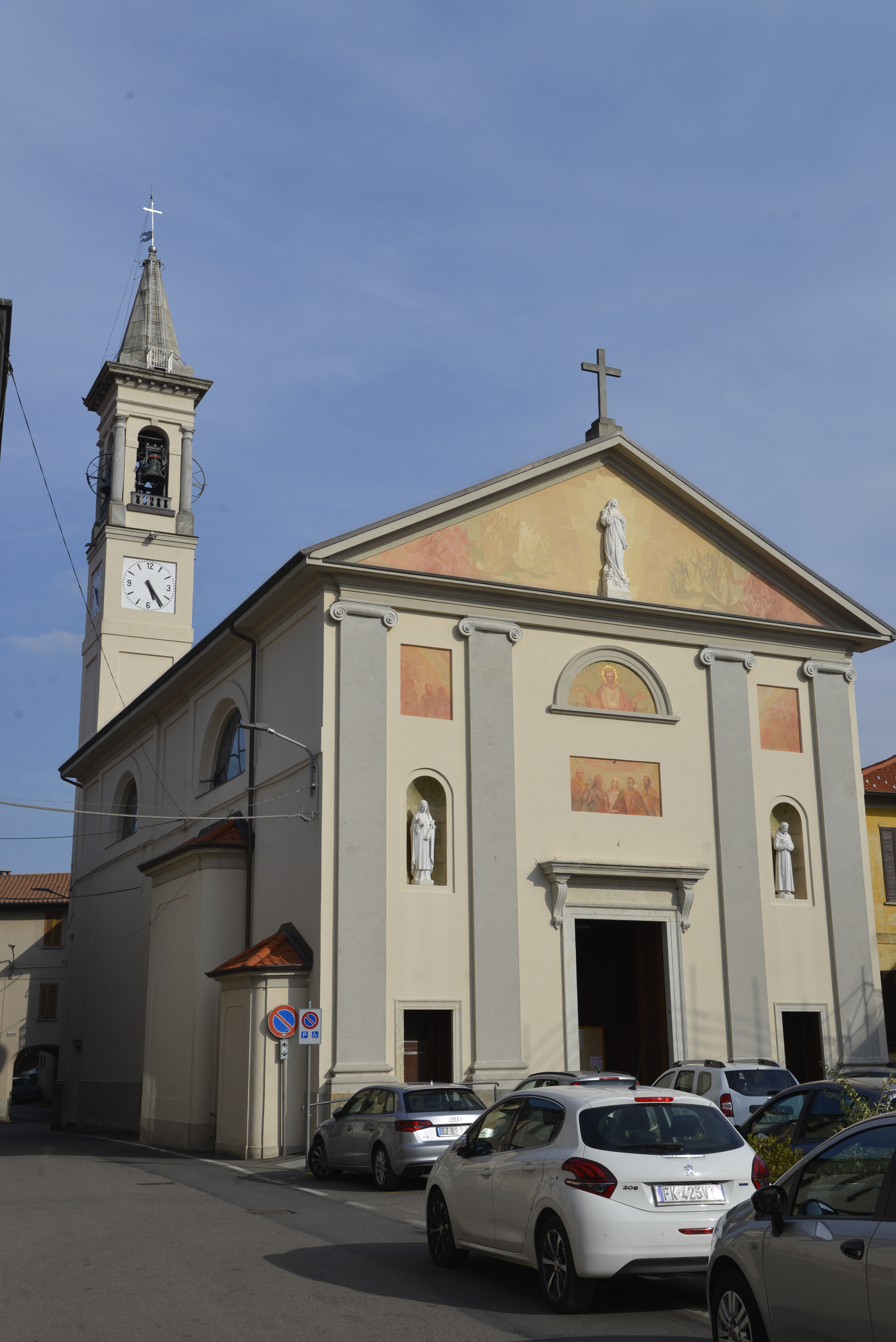
- The Church of All Saints, Cirimido

- Location within Italy Location within Lombardy
- Coordinates: 45°42′N 9°1′E
- Country: Italy
- Region: Lombardy
- Province: Province of Como (CO)

Area
  - Total: 2.6 km^{2} (1.0 sq mi)
- Elevation: 290 m (950 ft)

Population (Dec. 2004)
  - Total: 2,052
  - Density: 790/km^{2} (2,000/sq mi)
- Demonym: Cirimidesi
- Time zone: UTC+1 (CET)
  - Summer (DST): UTC+2 (CEST)
- Postal code: 22070
- Dialing code: 031
- Website: Official website

Cirimido (Comasco: Scirimed [ʃiˈriːmet]) is a comune (municipality) in the Province of Como in the Italian region Lombardy, located about 30 kilometres (19 mi) northwest of Milan and about 14 kilometres (9 mi) southwest of Como. As of 31 December 2004, it had a population of 2,052 and an area of 2.6 km^{2} (1.0 sq mi).

Cirimido borders the following municipalities: Fenegrò, Guanzate, Lomazzo, Turate.

== Demographic evolution ==
Historical population

Year	Pop.	±%
1861	918	—
1871	951	+3.6%
1881	1,023	+7.6%
1901	981	−4.1%
1911	1,057	+7.7%

Year	Pop.	±%
1921	1,275	+20.6%
1931	1,315	+3.1%
1936	1,347	+2.4%
1951	1,439	+6.8%
1961	1,502	+4.4%

Year	Pop.	±%
1971	1,573	+4.7%
1981	1,737	+10.4%
1991	1,844	+6.2%
2001	1,914	+3.8%

Source: Data from ISTAT
