= Rodero =

Rodero Rödur (Lombard)
- Comune
- Comune di Rodero
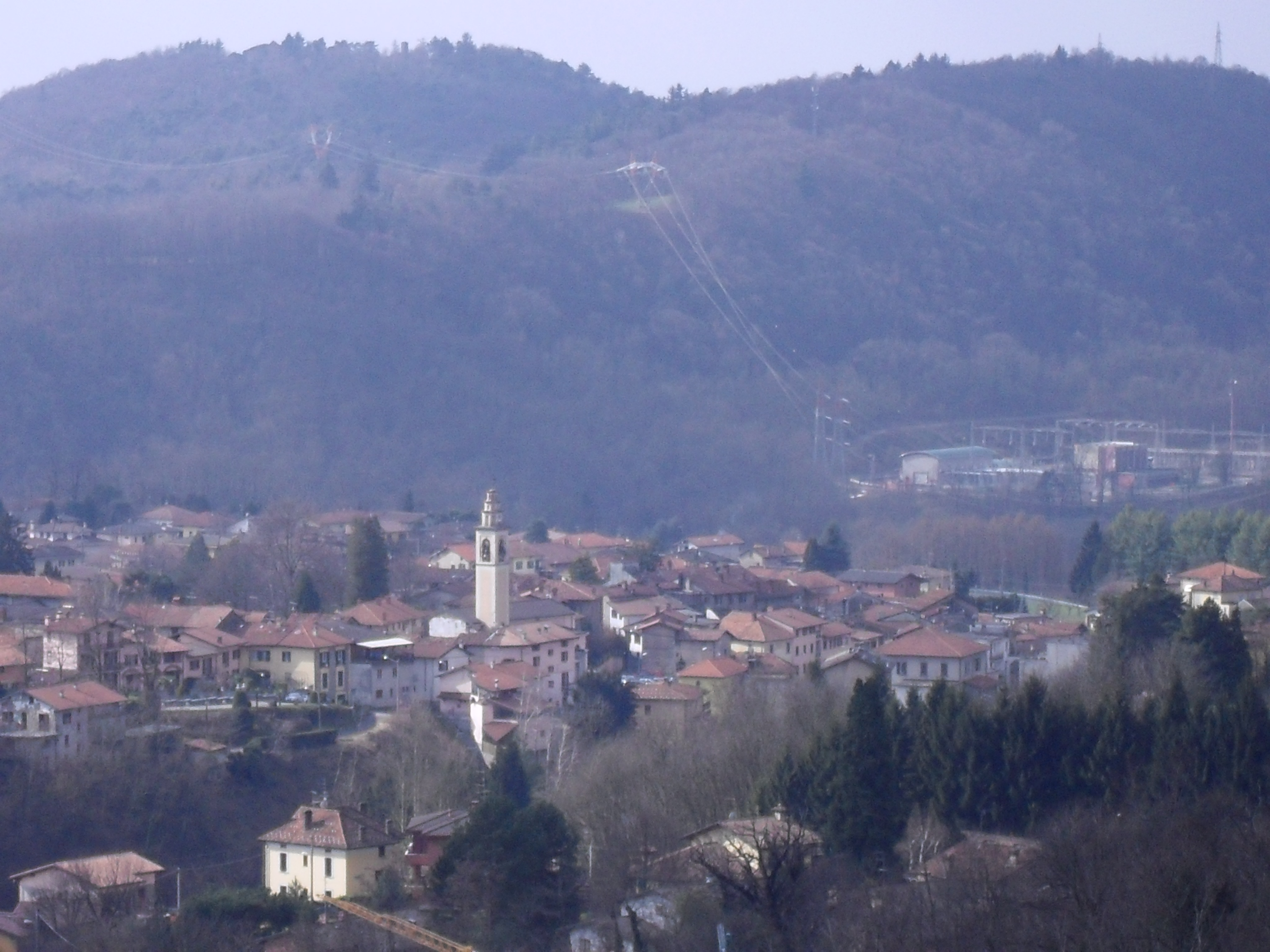

- Location within Italy Location within Lombardy
- Coordinates: 45°49′N 8°55′E
- Country: Italy
- Region: Lombardy
- Province: Como (CO)

Government
  - Mayor: Domenico Roncagli

Area
  - Total: 2.52 km^{2} (0.97 sq mi)
- Elevation: 400 m (1,300 ft)

Population (31 March 2017)
  - Total: 1,321
  - Density: 524/km^{2} (1,360/sq mi)
- Demonym: Roderesi
- Time zone: UTC+1 (CET)
  - Summer (DST): UTC+2 (CEST)
- Postal code: 22070
- Dialing code: 031
- Website: Official website

Rodero (Comasco: Rödur; [ˈrøːdur]) is a comune (municipality) located on the Swiss border about 45 kilometres (28 mi) northwest of Milan and about 13 kilometres (8 mi) west of Como in the Province of Como, Lombardy, Italy.

Rodero borders the following municipalities: Bizzarone, Cagno, Cantello, Stabio (Switzerland), Valmorea.

Lanza is the name of the main stream that flows in Rodero.
