= Bregnano =

Bregnano Bregnan (Lombard)
- Comune
- Comune di Bregnano
- Location within Italy Location within Lombardy
- Coordinates: 45°42′N 9°4′E
- Country: Italy
- Region: Lombardy
- Province: Como (CO)
- Frazioni: Gesiolo, Mengardo, Puginate, San Giorgio, San Michele, San Rocco

Government
  - Mayor: Elena Daddi

Area
  - Total: 6.2 km^{2} (2.4 sq mi)
- Elevation: 290 m (950 ft)

Population (31 March 2017)
  - Total: 6,466
  - Density: 1,000/km^{2} (2,700/sq mi)
- Demonym: Bregnanesi
- Time zone: UTC+1 (CET)
  - Summer (DST): UTC+2 (CEST)
- Postal code: 22070
- Dialing code: 031
- Website: Official website

Bregnano (Comasco: Bregnan [breˈɲãː]) is a comune (municipality) in the Province of Como in the Italian region of Lombardy, located about 25 kilometres (16 mi) northwest of Milan and about 13 kilometres (8 mi) south of Como.

Bregnano is divided in the frazioni of Mengardo, Puginate, Gesiolo, San Giorgio, San Michele and San Rocco. It borders the municipalities of Cadorago, Cermenate, Lazzate, Lomazzo and Rovellasca.

Churches in the town include San Michele, San Giorgio and Santi Ippolito e Cassiano.
