= Pognana Lario =

- Comune
- Comune di Pognana Lario
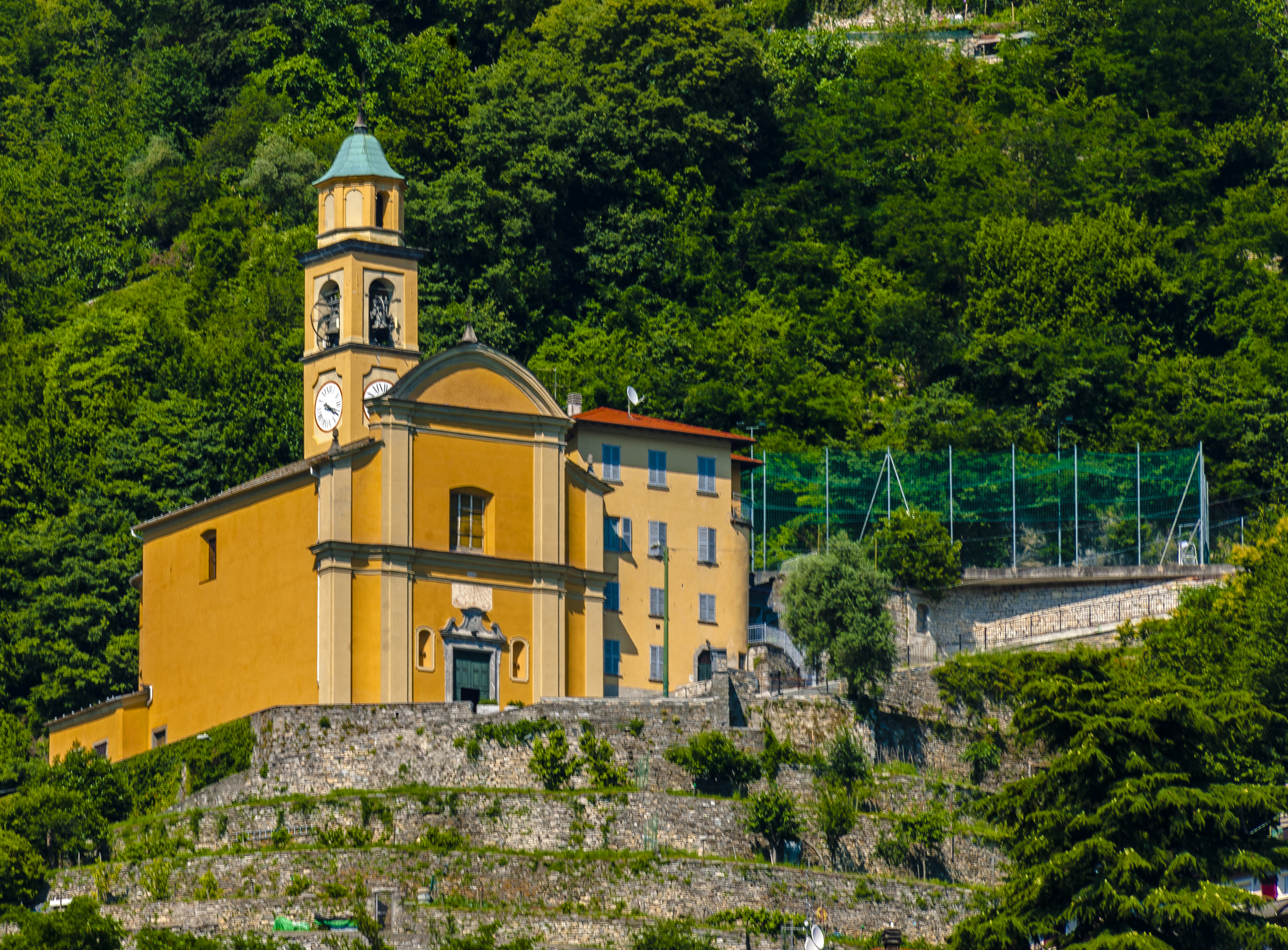
- Parrochia di Pognana from ferry on Lake Como

- Coat of arms

- Location within Italy Location within Lombardy
- Coordinates: 45°53′N 9°9′E
- Country: Italy
- Region: Lombardy
- Province: Como (CO)

Government
  - Mayor: Giuseppe Gandola

Area
  - Total: 5.07 km^{2} (1.96 sq mi)
- Elevation: 307 m (1,007 ft)

Population (Dec. 2004)
  - Total: 871
  - Density: 172/km^{2} (445/sq mi)
- Demonym: Pognanesi
- Time zone: UTC+1 (CET)
  - Summer (DST): UTC+2 (CEST)
- Postal code: 22020
- Dialing code: 031
- Website: comune.pognanalario.co.it

Pognana Lario (Comasco: Pugnana [puˈɲana]) is a comune (municipality) in the Province of Como in the Italian region Lombardy, located about 45 kilometres (28 mi) north of Milan and about 9 kilometres (6 mi) northeast of Como.

Pognana Lario borders the following municipalities: Faggeto Lario, Laglio, Nesso.
