= Lomazzo =

Lomazzo Lomazz (Lombard)
- Comune
- Città di Lomazzo
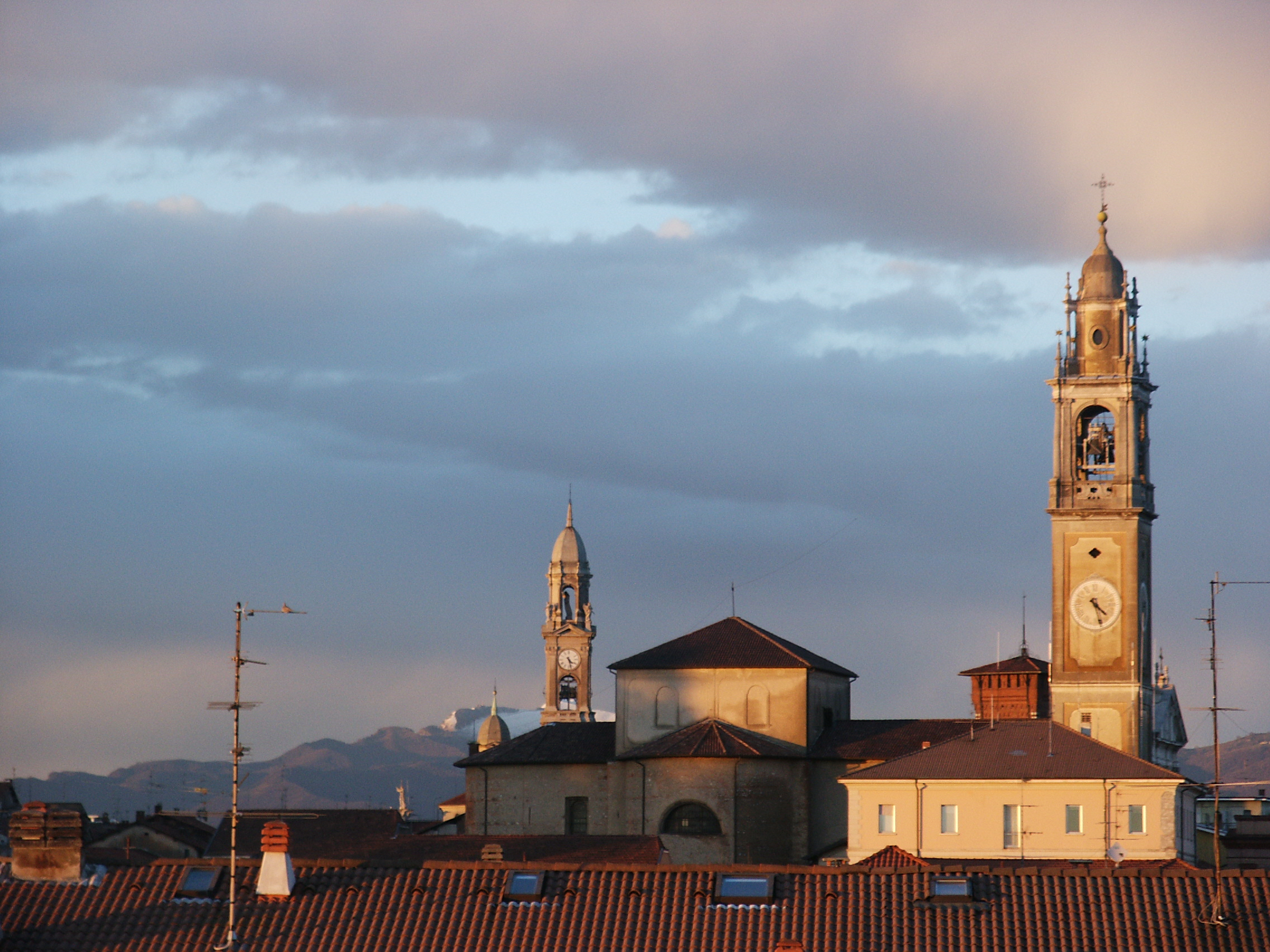

- Coat of arms

- Location within Italy Location within Lombardy
- Coordinates: 45°42′N 9°02′E
- Country: Italy
- Region: Lombardy
- Province: Como (CO)
- Frazioni: Manera

Government
  - Mayor: Giovanni Rusconi

Area
  - Total: 9.48 km^{2} (3.66 sq mi)
- Elevation: 296 m (971 ft)

Population (31 March 2017)
  - Total: 9,945
  - Density: 1,050/km^{2} (2,720/sq mi)
- Demonym: Lomazzesi
- Time zone: UTC+1 (CET)
  - Summer (DST): UTC+2 (CEST)
- Postal code: 22074
- Dialing code: 02
- Patron saint: St. Vitus, St. Syrus
- Saint day: December 9
- Website: Official website

Lomazzo (Western Lombard: Lomazz [luˈmats]) is a town and comune in the province of Como, in the Italian region of Lombardy. It is situated halfway between Como and Milan. The ancient historical center of the town was founded on the top of a hill situated in the valley on the right bank of Lura. The municipal territory contains a large portion of the Lura Park. Lomazzo received the title of Città (City) with a presidential decree on July 11, 2006. Lomazzo borders the following municipalities: Bregnano, Cadorago, Cirimido, Guanzate, Rovellasca, Rovello Porro, Turate.

== History ==
For more than one thousand years, the central street of Lomazzo has been the political and religious border that cut the town in two parts, from south to the north. The communal administration was divided as well, so the town of Lomazzo was governed separately by two municipalities: Lomazzo Comasco (parish of San Siro, also called Lomazzo di Sotto or, in dialect, Lumazz de Sott) and Lomazzo Milanese (parish of San Vito, also called Lomazzo di Sopra or Lumazz de Sura).

In the Middle Ages the border between the communes of Como and Milan already passed through Lomazzo. Still in the 16th century the custom duties were collected at the passage of Lomazzo border, for the feudal rights granted to the Carcano family by the Spaniards, who at the time controlled the Duchy of Milan.

The division of Lomazzo originated during the barbarian invasions. The Lombards settled down near the existing inhabited nucleus, remaining separate from the existing community so they could practice their Arian religion. Probably, when they were converted to Catholicism, they maintained a separate church. The missionaries were sent from towns of the diocese of Milan, so the first community continued to be in the diocese of Como and the new community remained faithful to the diocese of Milan.

Ghibelline Como and Guelph Milan warred bitterly during the medieval period. This conflict was contemporary with the war between the Lombardy free cities and the Holy Roman emperor Frederick Barbarossa.

Due to its double administration, the town of Lomazzo was always declared neutral ground by the two factions. After the wars, the ambassadors met here and here they proclaimed the peaces. The first peace treaty was signed in 1249, but war renewed and years of disagreement continued.

In 1282, Giovanni De Avvogadri, expelled by the Ghibellines from his bishopric in Come, excommunicated them from Lomazzo, starting the war between Como and Milan. In 1286, after four years of intense war, representatives of the republics of Lombardy and of northern-Italy free cities, arrived to Lomazzo to sign the Peace of Lomazzo, at the presence of Loterio Rusca, Lord of Como, and Ottone Visconti, Lord of Milan.

== Reunion ==
The civil union of Lomazzo was completed in 1816, when the Austrian puppet state of Lombardy-Venetia unified the two communities of Lomazzo Comasco and Milanese to become the single municipality of Lomazzo. The two parishes were also unified in 1981 under the bishopric of Como.

== Main sights ==
- The Arch of the Peace (1875), on the road from Saronno to Como, replacing the medieval one.
- Church of St. Syrus (1732). It houses a 16th-century panel by Morazzone (Adoration of the Magi). Other good canvasses embellish the small lateral church of Saint Joseph, built in 1629, with contemporary decoration.
- Medieval Tower (1904), one of the symbols of Lomazzo.
- Brolo di San Vito, the square in front of St. Vitus Vito church. A commemorative stone reminds the Peace of Lomazzo
- Church of Saint Vito (19th century), designed by the Swiss Simone Cantoni.

== People ==
- Michele Carcano, (1427-1484), Franciscan preacher, co-founder of the montes pietatis banking system
- Giovanni Paolo Lomazzo (1538–1600), painter
- Giuditta Pasta (1797-1865), soprano, born from Negri's family of Lomazzo
- Francesco Somaini, (1926-2005), sculptor
- Dolores Puthod, (1934-), painter at the theatre La Scala
- Claudio Villa (1959- ), comics artist

== Culture ==
Events in the town include:

- Re-eanctement feast of the “Peace of Lomazzo – 1286”.
- Carnival of Lomazzo, first Sunday before Lent.

== Transportation ==
Lomazzo is connected by A9 Milano-Como-Chiasso Highway. It is also an important railway station on the line Milano-Saronno-Como of the Ferrovie Nord Milano.

Lomazzo is connected with all towns around by bus services (S.P.T. buses: bus line C64/C66 Lomazzo – Appiano – Olgiate; bus line C84 Lomazzo – Cantù; F.N.M.A. buses: bus line Lomazzo – Cislago).
