= Fenegrò =

Fenegrò Fenegró (Lombard)
- Comune
- Comune di Fenegrò
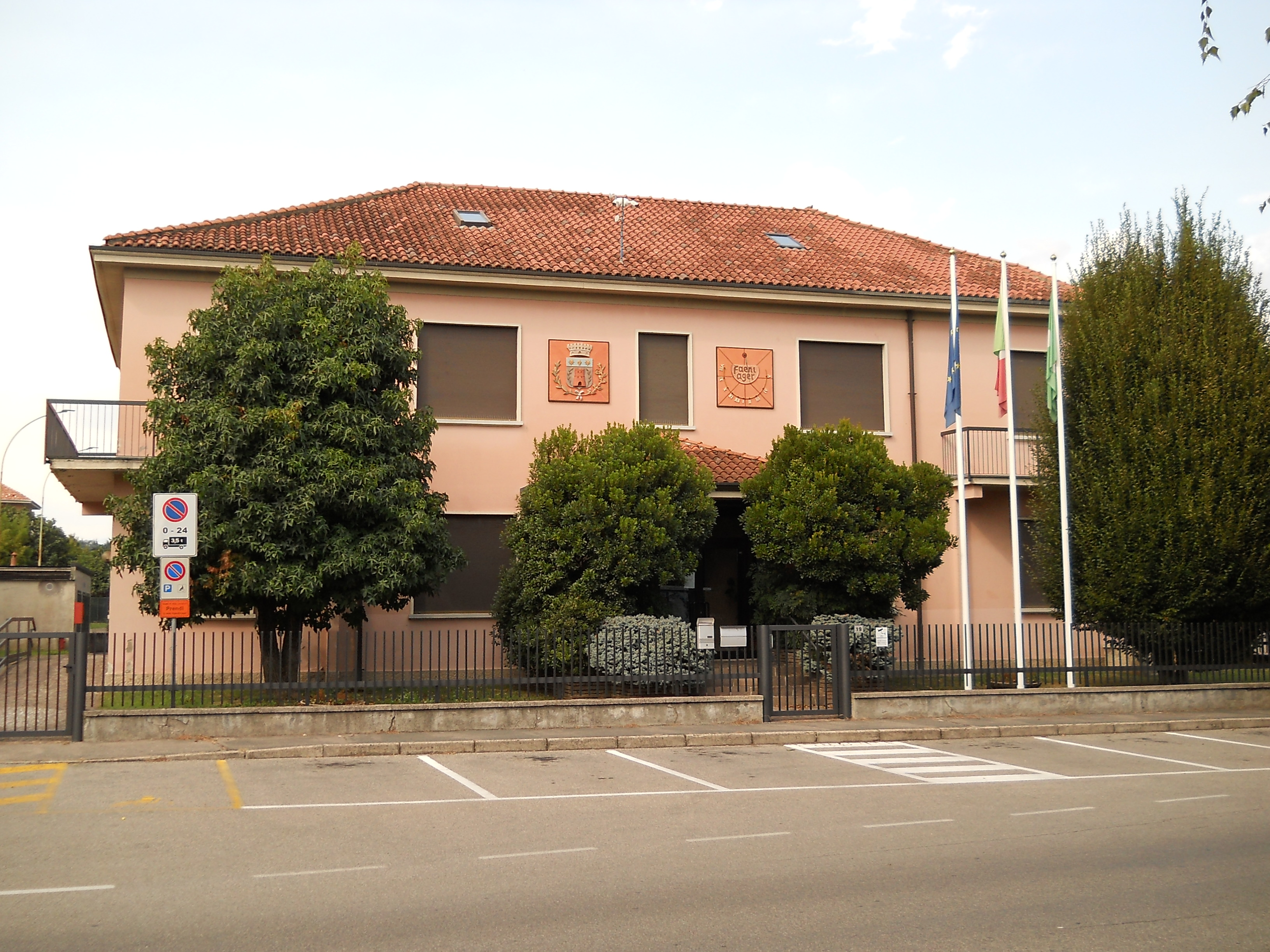
- Fenegrò City Hall

- Location within Italy Location within Lombardy
- Coordinates: 45°42′N 9°0′E
- Country: Italy
- Region: Lombardy
- Province: Province of Como (CO)

Area
  - Total: 5.4 km^{2} (2.1 sq mi)
- Elevation: 290 m (950 ft)

Population (Dec. 2004)
  - Total: 2,718
  - Density: 500/km^{2} (1,300/sq mi)
- Demonym: Fenegrolesi
- Time zone: UTC+1 (CET)
  - Summer (DST): UTC+2 (CEST)
- Postal code: 22070
- Dialing code: 031
- Website: Official website

Fenegrò (Comasco: Fenegró [feneˈɡroː]) is a comune (municipality) in the Province of Como in the Italian region Lombardy, located about 30 kilometres (19 mi) northwest of Milan and about 14 kilometres (9 mi) southwest of Como. As of 1 January 2022, it had a population of 3,211 and an area of 5.4 km^{2} (2.1 sq mi).

Fenegrò borders the following municipalities: Cirimido, Guanzate, Limido Comasco, Lurago Marinone, Turate, Veniano.

== Demographic evolution ==
Historical population

Year	Pop.	±%
1861	1,528	—
1871	1,491	−2.4%
1881	1,605	+7.6%
1901	1,460	−9.0%
1911	1,512	+3.6%

Year	Pop.	±%
1921	1,708	+13.0%
1931	1,586	−7.1%
1936	1,694	+6.8%
1951	1,874	+10.6%
1961	1,970	+5.1%

Year	Pop.	±%
1971	2,173	+10.3%
1981	2,211	+1.7%
1991	2,301	+4.1%
2001	2,553	+11.0%

Source: Data from ISTAT
