= Orsenigo =

Orsenigo is an Italian surname. Notable people with the surname include:

- Cesare Orsenigo (1873–1946), Vatican diplomat
- Giovanni Battista Orsenigo (1837–1904, Italian monk and dentist
- Simone da Orsenigo, Italian architect
- Vittorio Orsenigo (1926–2025), Italian short story writer, novelist and theatre director
