= Albese con Cassano =

Albese con Cassano Albes Cassan (Lombard)
- Comune
- Comune di Albese con Cassano
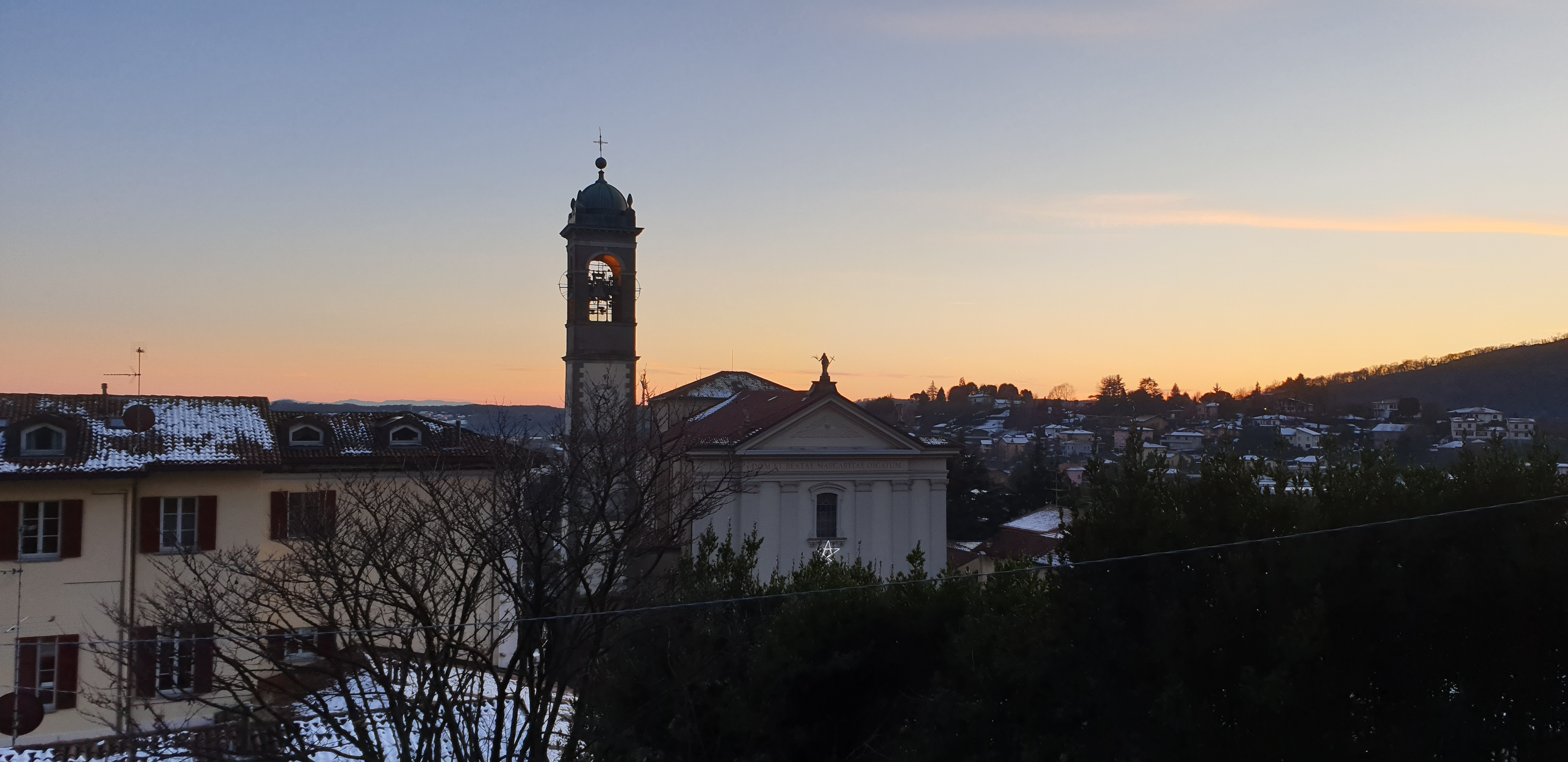
- Panorama of Albese con Cassano

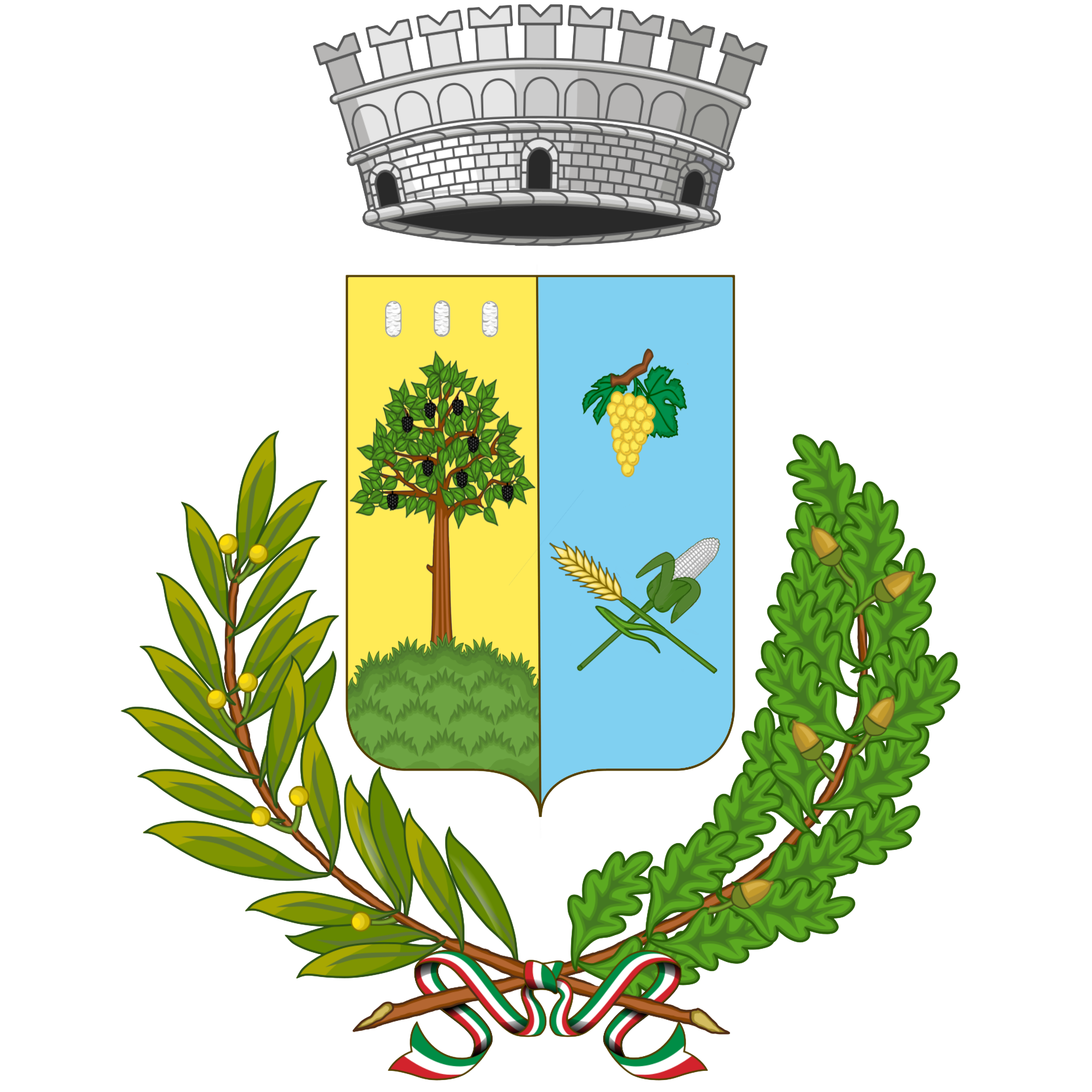
- Coat of arms

- Location of Albese con Cassano in Italy Albese con Cassano (Lombardy)
- Coordinates: 45°48′N 9°10′E
- Country: Italy
- Region: Lombardy
- Province: Como (CO)

Government
  - Mayor: Carlo Ballabio (since May 2019)

Area
  - Total: 7.95 km^{2} (3.07 sq mi)
- Elevation: 402 m (1,319 ft)

Population (2024)
  - Total: 4,237
  - Density: 533/km^{2} (1,380/sq mi)
- Demonym: Albesini
- Time zone: UTC+1 (CET)
  - Summer (DST): UTC+2 (CEST)
- Postal code: 22032
- Dialing code: 031

Albese con Cassano (Brianzöö: Albes e Cassan) is a town and comune in the province of Como, Lombardy, Italy.
