= Cassina Rizzardi =

- Comune
- Comune di Cassina Rizzardi
- Location within Italy Location within Lombardy
- Coordinates: 45°45′N 9°2′E
- Country: Italy
- Region: Lombardy
- Province: Como (CO)
- Frazioni: Boffalora, Monticello, Ronco

Government
  - Mayor: Paolo De Cecchi

Area
  - Total: 3 km^{2} (1.2 sq mi)

Population (2011)
  - Total: 3,252
  - Density: 1,100/km^{2} (2,800/sq mi)
- Demonym: Cassinesi
- Time zone: UTC+1 (CET)
  - Summer (DST): UTC+2 (CEST)
- Postal code: 22070
- Dialing code: 031
- Patron saint: St. Joseph
- Saint day: 3rd Sunday of September
- Website: Official website

Cassina Rizzardi is a town and comune in the province of Como, in Lombardy.
