= Mozzate =

- Comune
- Comune di Mozzate
- Mozzaa (Lombard)
- Location within Italy Location within Lombardy
- Coordinates: 45°41′N 8°57′E
- Country: Italy
- Region: Lombardy
- Province: Province of Como (CO)
- Frazioni: San Martino, Santa Maria Solaro

Area
  - Total: 10.36 km^{2} (4.00 sq mi)
- Elevation: 246 m (807 ft)

Population (2001)
  - Total: 6,874
  - Density: 663.5/km^{2} (1,718/sq mi)
- Demonym: Mozzatesi
- Time zone: UTC+1 (CET)
  - Summer (DST): UTC+2 (CEST)
- Postal code: 22076
- Dialing code: 0331
- Website: Official website

Mozzate (Western Lombard: Mozzaa [muˈtsaː]) is a comune in the southwestern part of the province of Como, Lombardy, northern Italy.

It has an area of 10.36 square kilometres (4.00 mi^{2}) and 7,505 inhabitants (2005). The postal code of Mozzate is 22076, and the telephone code is 0331.

Mozzate hosts the Rohm and Haas plant, which produces adhesives used in the packaging and automotive industries.
