= Carate Urio =

Carate Urio Caraa Uri (Lombard)
- Comune
- Comune di Carate Urio
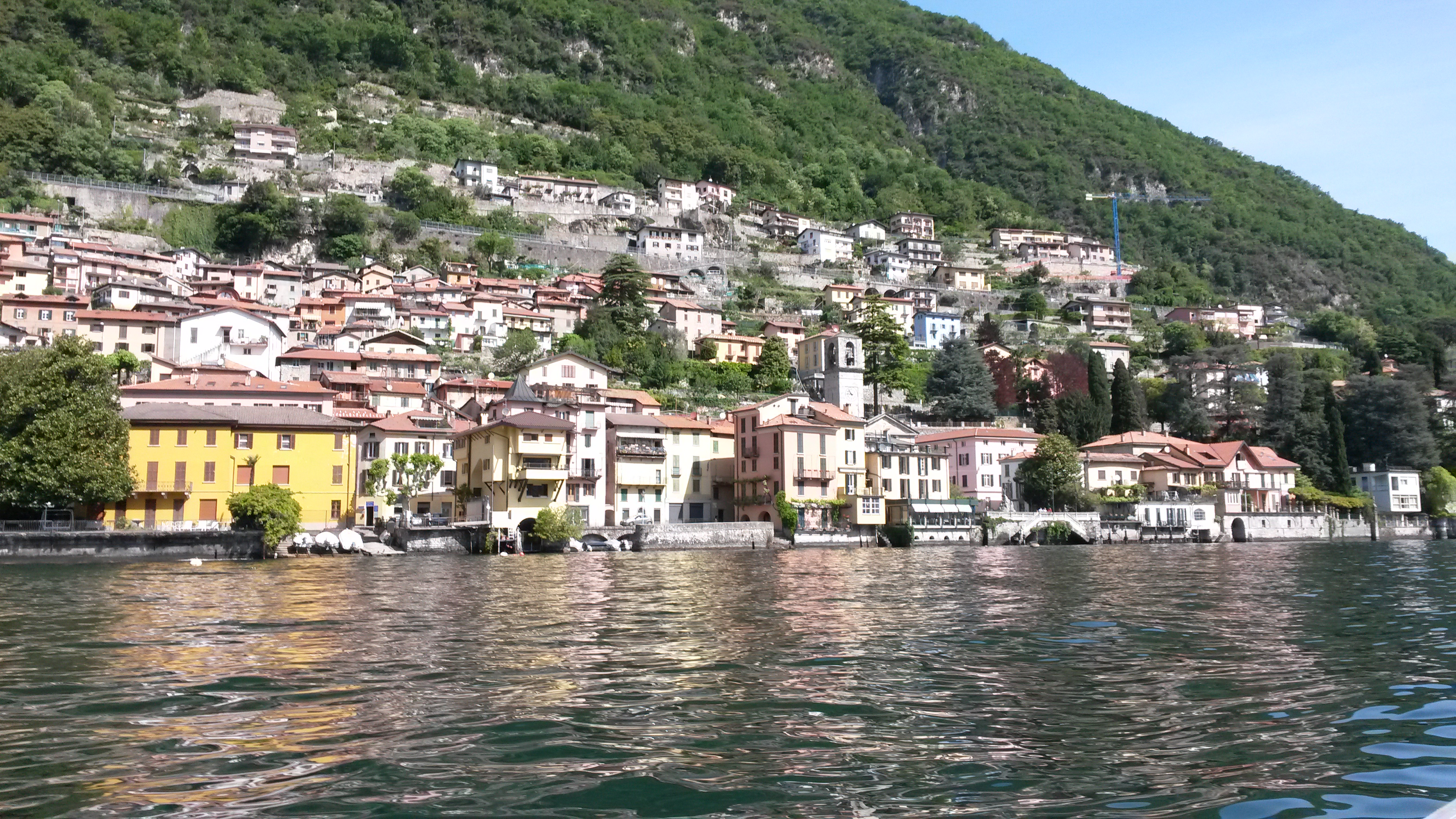

- Coat of arms

- Location within Italy Location within Lombardy
- Coordinates: 45°52′N 9°7′E
- Country: Italy
- Region: Lombardy
- Province: Como (CO)
- Frazioni: Cavadino, Greppone, Pangino, Riva, Olzavino, Lestresio

Government
  - Mayor: Paola Pepe

Area
  - Total: 6.9 km^{2} (2.7 sq mi)
- Elevation: 199 m (653 ft)

Population (31 December 2010)
  - Total: 1,216
  - Density: 180/km^{2} (460/sq mi)
- Demonym: Caratesi
- Time zone: UTC+1 (CET)
  - Summer (DST): UTC+2 (CEST)
- Postal code: 22010
- Dialing code: 031

Carate Urio (Comasco: Caraa Uri [kaˌraː ˈyːri]) is a comune (municipality) in the Province of Como in the Italian region Lombardy, located about 45 kilometres (28 mi) north of Milan and about 6 kilometres (4 mi) northeast of Como.

Founded in 1927 by the merger of Carate Lario and Urio, Carate Urio borders the following municipalities: Brienno, Faggeto Lario, Laglio, Moltrasio, Schignano, Torno.
