= Argegno =

Argegno Argegn (Lombard)
- Comune
- Comune di Argegno
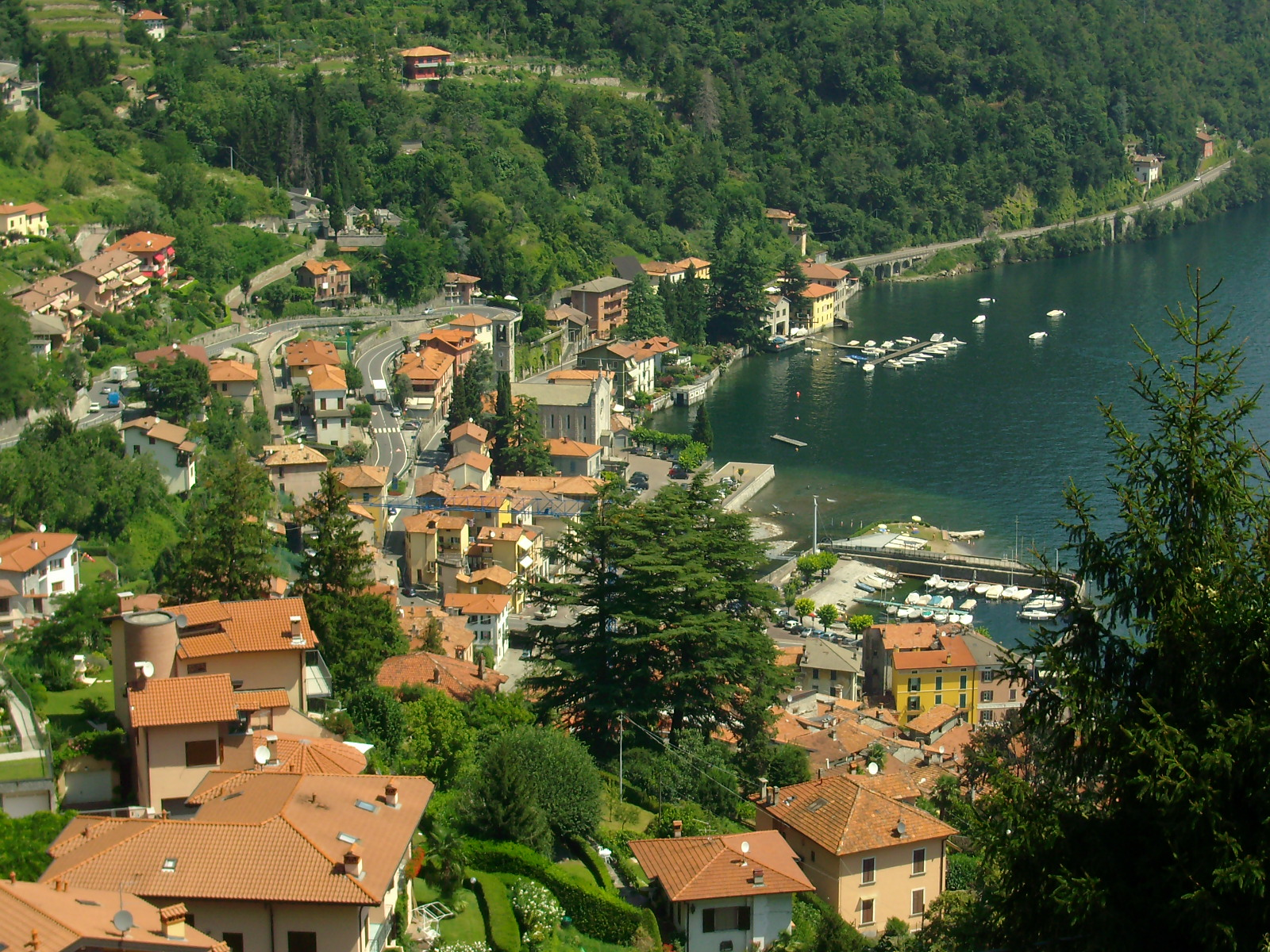
- View of Argegno

- Location of Argegno in Italy Argegno (Lombardy)
- Coordinates: 45°57′N 9°8′E
- Country: Italy
- Region: Lombardy
- Province: Province of Como (CO)

Area
  - Total: 4.3 km^{2} (1.7 sq mi)

Population (March. 2024)
  - Total: 679
  - Density: 160/km^{2} (410/sq mi)
- Time zone: UTC+1 (CET)
  - Summer (DST): UTC+2 (CEST)
- Postal code: 22010
- Dialing code: 031
- Website: Official website

Argegno (Comasco: Argegn) is a comune (municipality) in the Province of Como in the Italian region Lombardy, located about 50 kilometres (31 mi) north of Milan and about 15 kilometres (9 mi) north of Como. As of March 2024, it had a population of 679 and an area of 4.3 square kilometres (1.7 mi^{2}).

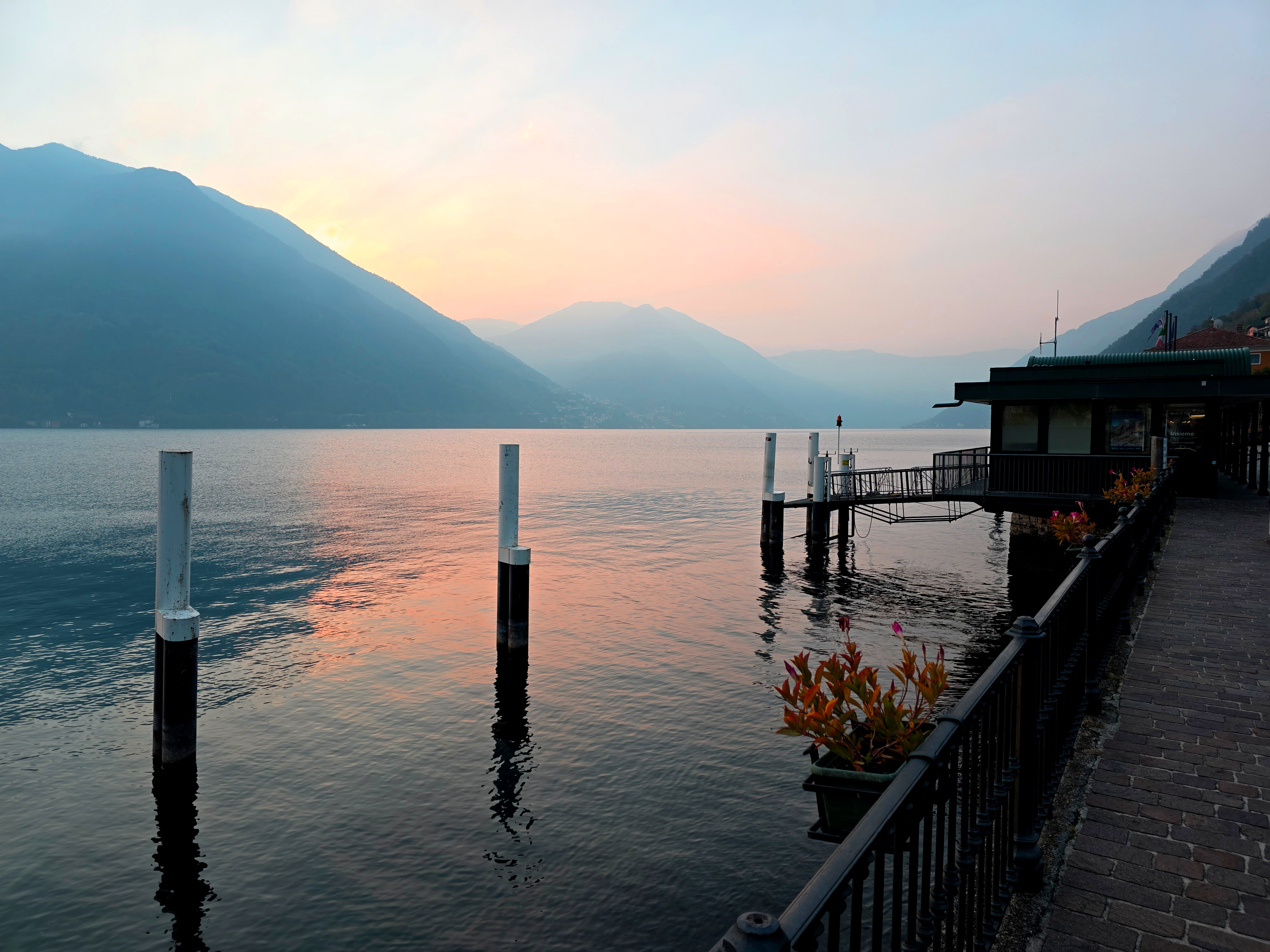
Argegno: Como Lake

Sanctuary of Sant'Anna

The local economy is heavily dependent upon tourism and the service industry. the official tourist website for Argegno is www.visitargegno.com.

A cable car can transport people up to the nearby village of Pigra.

Argegno is situated on an inlet in the lake, and is built alongside the River Telo which flows into the lake, the discharge of which is heavily dependent upon the season.

Argegno borders the following municipalities: Brienno, Colonno, Dizzasco, Lezzeno, Nesso, Pigra, Schignano. It is situated between the villages of Menaggio and Cernobbio.

== History of Argegno ==
Argegno is of Roman origin, and is named after the Roman consul Publio Cesio Archigene. With the fall of Rome and the subsequent geopolitical instability in Italy a series of fortifications were constructed in the medieval period, including the arched bridge which still stands. The largest structure in the village is the Sanctuary of Sant'Anna, which was constructed in the seventeenth century, and contains stucco work from later time.

== Demographic evolution ==
Historical population

Year	Pop.	±%
1861	702	—
1871	771	+9.8%
1881	695	−9.9%
1901	698	+0.4%
1911	876	+25.5%

Year	Pop.	±%
1921	870	−0.7%
1931	855	−1.7%
1936	780	−8.8%
1951	804	+3.1%
1961	830	+3.2%

Year	Pop.	±%
1971	744	−10.4%
1981	702	−5.6%
1991	679	−3.3%
2001	654	−3.7%

Source: Data from ISTAT
