= Blessagno =

Blessagno Blessagn Biessagn
- Comune
- Comune di Blessagno
- Coat of arms

- Location within Italy Location within Lombardy
- Coordinates: 45°58′N 9°6′E
- Country: Italy
- Region: Lombardy
- Province: Como (CO)

Government
  - Mayor: Piero Righetti

Area
  - Total: 3.6 km^{2} (1.4 sq mi)
- Elevation: 762 m (2,500 ft)

Population (13 March 2017)
  - Total: 275
  - Density: 76/km^{2} (200/sq mi)
- Demonym: Blessagnesi
- Time zone: UTC+1 (CET)
  - Summer (DST): UTC+2 (CEST)
- Postal code: 22028
- Dialing code: 031
- Website: Official website

Blessagno (Comasco: Blessagn [bleˈsaɲ] or Biessagn [bjeˈsaɲ]) is a comune (municipality) in the Province of Como in the Italian region Lombardy, located about 60 kilometres (37 mi) north of Milan and about 15 kilometres (9.3 mi) north of Como.

Blessagno borders the following municipalities: Centro Valle Intelvi, Dizzasco, Laino, Pigra.
