= Schignano =

Schignano Schignàn (Lombard)
- Comune
- Comune di Schignano
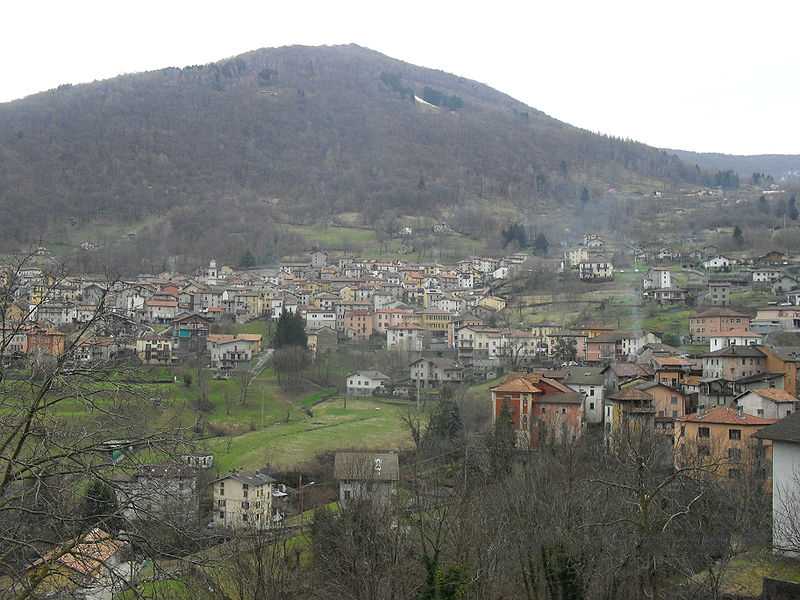
- Schignano

- Coat of arms

- Location within Italy Location within Lombardy
- Coordinates: 45°56′N 9°6′E
- Country: Italy
- Region: Lombardy
- Province: Como (CO)
- Frazioni: Almanno, Auvrascio, Molobbio, Occagno, Perla, Retegno, Vesbio

Government
  - Mayor: Ferruccio Rigola

Area
  - Total: 10.12 km^{2} (3.91 sq mi)
- Elevation: 650 m (2,130 ft)

Population (31 July 2017)
  - Total: 852
  - Density: 84.2/km^{2} (218/sq mi)
- Demonym: Schignanesi
- Time zone: UTC+1 (CET)
  - Summer (DST): UTC+2 (CEST)
- Postal code: 22020
- Dialing code: 031
- Website: Official website

Schignano (Comasco: Schignàn [ʃkiˈɲãː]) is a comune (municipality) in the Province of Como in the Italian region Lombardy, located about 50 kilometres (31 mi) north of Milan and about 13 kilometres (8 mi) north of Como, on the border with Switzerland.

Schignano borders the following municipalities: Argegno, Brienno, Breggia (Switzerland), Carate Urio, Centro Valle Intelvi, Cerano d'Intelvi, Dizzasco, Moltrasio.

== Twin towns ==
- Saint-Amé, France
- Cermenate, Italy
