= Villa Plinianina =

Villa in Torno, Italy

Coordinates: 45.85898°N 9.12810°E

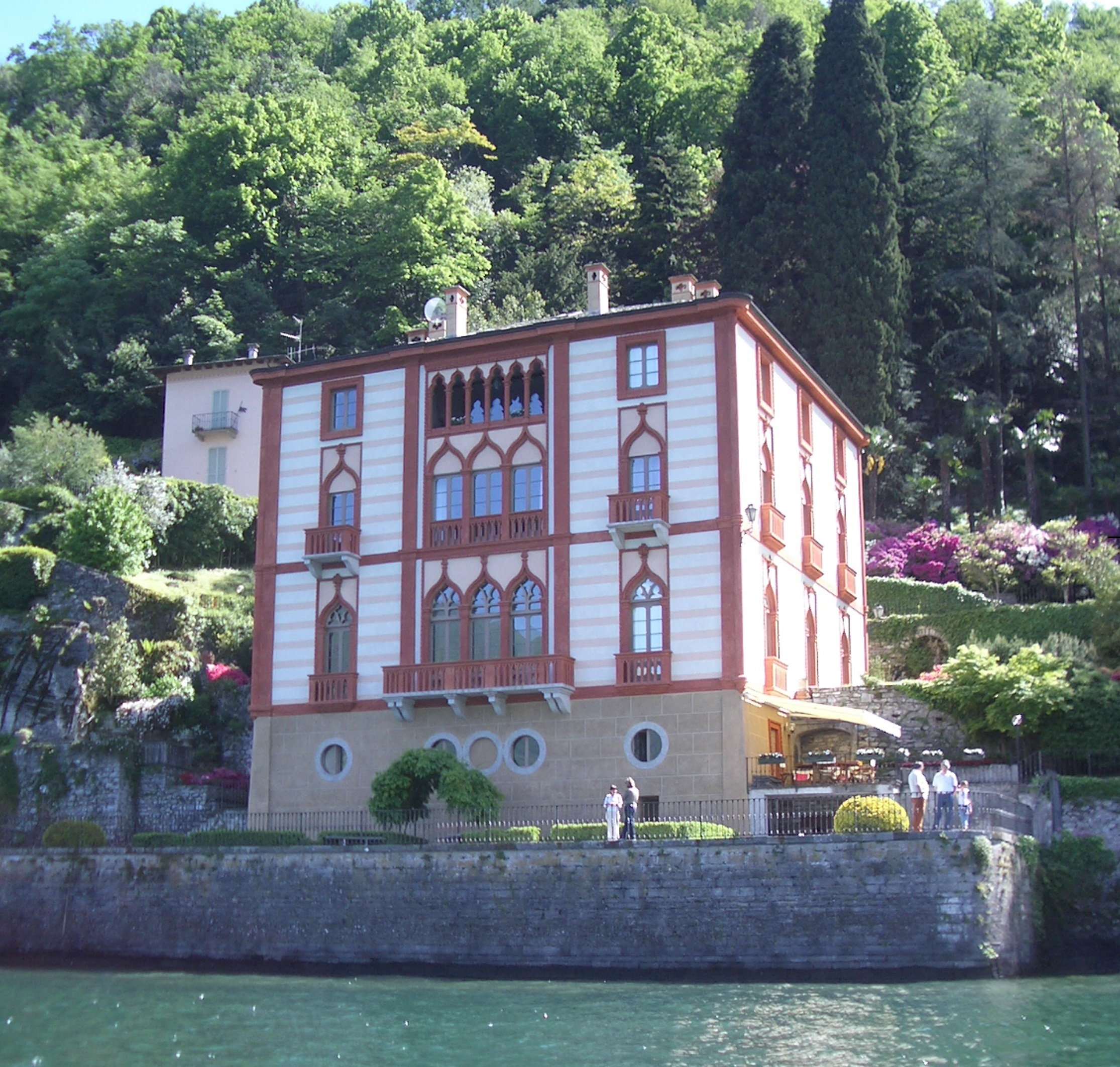
Villa Plinianina

Villa Plinianina is a patrician rural palace on the shores of Lake Como, located in the comune of Torno, Province of Como, region of Lombardy, Italy.

The palace was named after a nearby spring identified by Pliny the Elder and a nearby Villa Pliniana (the name means "Small Pliniana"). A house on the property was built on this remote stretch by Giovanni Anguissola in 1570. Originally owned by the Caprera family, in 1839 the property was sold to countess Alessandrina de Mondran, wife of Count Ernesto Tanzi di Blevio, whose father had built nearby Villa Tanzi-Taverna in Torno. During the 19th-century, one of the owners was Marchesa Maria Trotti Belgioso.

The present villa was built in around 1855 by Canzio Canzi or Giovanni Antonio Piotti from Vacallo.
