= Dizzasco =

Dizzasco Dizàsch (Lombard)
- Comune
- Comune di Dizzasco
- Coat of arms

- Location within Italy Location within Lombardy
- Coordinates: 45°57′N 9°6′E
- Country: Italy
- Region: Lombardy
- Province: Como (CO)

Government
  - Mayor: Giovanni Candiani

Area
  - Total: 3.61 km^{2} (1.39 sq mi)

Population (31 March 2017)
  - Total: 619
  - Density: 171/km^{2} (444/sq mi)
- Demonym: Dizzaschesi
- Time zone: UTC+1 (CET)
  - Summer (DST): UTC+2 (CEST)
- Postal code: 22020
- Dialing code: 031
- Website: Official website

Dizzasco (Comasco: Dizàsch [diˈtsaʃk]) is a comune (municipality) in the Province of Como in the Italian region Lombardy, located about 50 kilometres (31 mi) north of Milan and about 15 kilometres (9 mi) north of Como.

Dizzasco borders the following municipalities: Argegno, Blessagno, Centro Valle Intelvi, Cerano d'Intelvi, Pigra, Schignano.
