= Moltrasio =

Moltrasio Moltras (Lombard)
- Comune
- Comune di Moltrasio
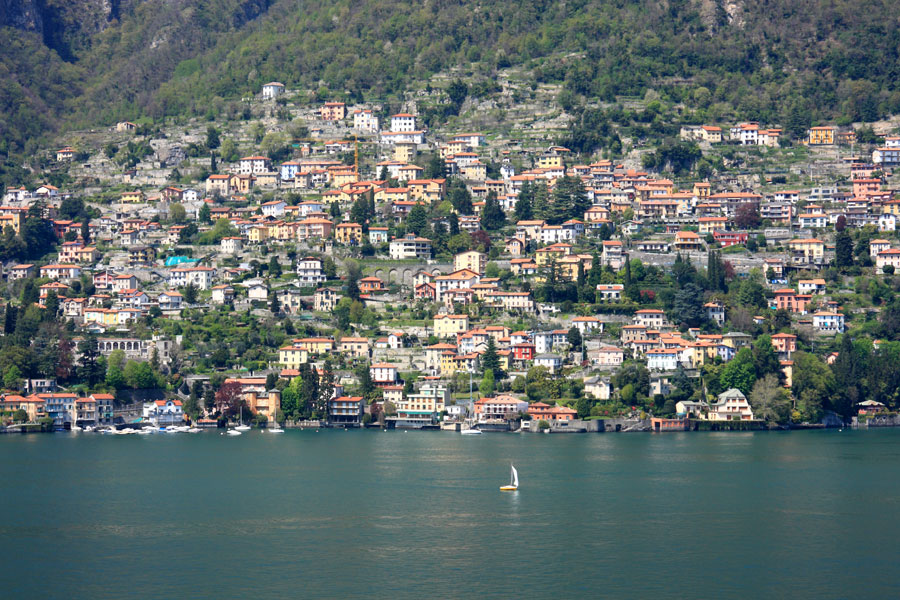
- Moltrasio on the western shore of Lake Como

- Coat of arms

- Location within Italy Location within Lombardy
- Coordinates: 45°52′N 9°6′E
- Country: Italy
- Region: Lombardy
- Province: Como (CO)
- Frazioni: Bordolino, Carisciano, Casarico, Craolino, Donegano, Luscesino, Roiano, Somaino, Tosnacco, Vergonzano, Vighinzano, Vignola

Government
  - Mayor: Maria Carmela Ioculano

Area
  - Total: 8.9 km^{2} (3.4 sq mi)
- Elevation: 247 m (810 ft)

Population (31 December 2010)
  - Total: 1,710
  - Density: 190/km^{2} (500/sq mi)
- Demonym: Moltrasini
- Time zone: UTC+1 (CET)
  - Summer (DST): UTC+2 (CEST)
- Postal code: 22010
- Dialing code: 031
- Website: Official website

Moltrasio (Italian: [molˈtraːzjo]; Comasco: Moltras [mulˈtraːs]) is a comune (municipality) in the Province of Como in the Italian region of Lombardy. It is located about 45 kilometres (28 mi) north of Milan and about 6 kilometres (4 mi) north of Como, near the border with Switzerland, on the western shore of Lake Como.

Moltrasio borders the following municipalities: Blevio, Breggia (Switzerland), Carate Urio, Cernobbio, Schignano, and Torno.
