= La Via dei Monti Lariani =

Mountain hiking trail along the western bank of Como Lake

- Length: 125 km (78 mi)
- Location: Lombardy
- Trailheads: Cernobbio, Sorico
- Use: Hiking
- Highest point: 1300 m
- Lowest point: 200 m
- Sights: Views over Lake Como
- Hazards: streams in spate in wet weather

La Via dei Monti Lariani (variously translated into English as the Monti Lariani Way, the Monti Lariani Trail, or the Lariani Mountain Trail) is a long-distance footpath in the hills on the west side of Lake Como, in Lombardy, Italy. Its total length is approximately 125 km (80 miles), and its average altitude is about 1000 m, compared with the approximately 200 m of the lake shore. The trail starts in Cernobbio, just north-west of the city of Como, and ends at Sorico, at the northern extreme of the lake. The trail is conventionally divided into four numbered sections, each with different waymarking, but these do not correspond to days of walking; Sections 1-3 would each involve at least two days' walking for a normally fit person, while the fourth section is itself divided into two sections each of which could well require more than a single day. The path runs through a mixture of forest and pasture land, frequently offering magnificent views over the lake.

== Sections ==
- 1. Cernobbio to San Fedele Intelvi, a frazione of Centro Valle Intelvi: 28 km
- 2. San Fedele to Croce, a frazione of Menaggio: 26 km. A bus transfer is recommended to avoid a 1 km hike on a busy road to start Section 3.
- 3. Grandola ed Uniti to Garzeno: 25 km
- 4a. Garzeno to Peglio: 24 km
- 4b. Peglio to Sorico: 22 km

== Terrain ==
The path is based on old mountain mule-tracks and on the roughly paved stone military roads built during the First World War to service the Cadorna Line of defensive fortifications along the Italo-Swiss border. Accordingly, it typically does not go over peaks, which rise to 1300-2000 m in its neighbourhood, though side excursions to the peaks along established paths are often possible. Sections 1 and 2 are largely on these military roads, with bridges over all significant watercourses; furthermore the underlying rock in this region is mainly limestone, so that the terrain dries quickly. Section 3 is generally on unpaved and sometimes not so well defined paths, and the underlying rock is granite; as a result, in rainy periods some of the streams may be impassible.

== Accommodation ==
At the level of the path, overnight accommodation is available in numerous Agriturismo establishments and Rifugi maintained by local branches of the Club Alpino Italiano (C. A. I., Italian Alpine Club). At frequent points along the path, it is possible to descend by a road or well-maintained track to the villages along the lake shore, where hotels can be found.
