= Laino =

Laino Laìn (Lombard)
- Comune
- Comune di Laino
- Location within Italy Location within Lombardy
- Coordinates: 45°58′N 9°5′E
- Country: Italy
- Region: Lombardy
- Province: Como (CO)

Government
  - Mayor: Cipriano Soldati

Area
  - Total: 6.68 km^{2} (2.58 sq mi)
- Elevation: 700 m (2,300 ft)

Population (31 March 2017)
  - Total: 495
  - Density: 74.1/km^{2} (192/sq mi)
- Demonym: Lainesi
- Time zone: UTC+1 (CET)
  - Summer (DST): UTC+2 (CEST)
- Postal code: 22020
- Dialing code: 031
- Website: Official website

Laino (Comasco: Laìn [laˈĩː]) is a comune (municipality) in the province of Como in the Italian region Lombardy, located about 60 kilometres (37 mi) north of Milan and about 15 kilometres (9 mi) north of Como.

Laino borders the following municipalities: Alta Valle Intelvi, Blessagno, Centro Valle Intelvi, Claino con Osteno, Colonno, Pigra, Ponna.

Painter Livio Retti was born in Laino (30 November 1692).
