= Brienno =

Brienno Brienn (Lombard)
- Comune
- Comune di Brienno
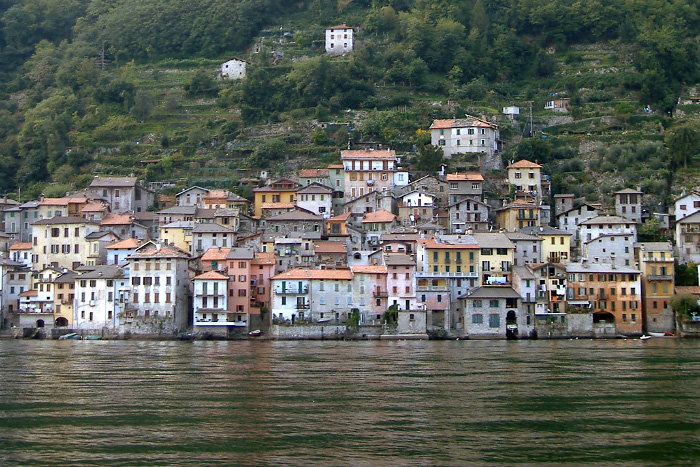
- View of Brienno

- Location within Italy Location within Lombardy
- Coordinates: 45°54′N 9°8′E
- Country: Italy
- Region: Lombardy
- Province: Como (CO)

Government
  - Mayor: Francesco Cavadini

Area
  - Total: 9.1 km^{2} (3.5 sq mi)
- Elevation: 203 m (666 ft)

Population (31 March 2017)
  - Total: 337
  - Density: 37/km^{2} (96/sq mi)
- Demonym: Briennesi
- Time zone: UTC+1 (CET)
  - Summer (DST): UTC+2 (CEST)
- Postal code: 22010
- Dialing code: 031
- Website: Official website

Brienno (Comasco: Brienn [briˈɛn]) is a comune (municipality) in the Province of Como in the Italian region of Lombardy, located about 50 kilometres (31 mi) north of Milan and about 10 kilometres (6 mi) northeast of Como.

Brienno borders the following municipalities: Argegno, Carate Urio, Laglio, Nesso, and Schignano.
