= Cerano d'Intelvi =

Cerano d'Intelvi Sceran (Lombard)
- Comune
- Comune di Cerano d'Intelvi
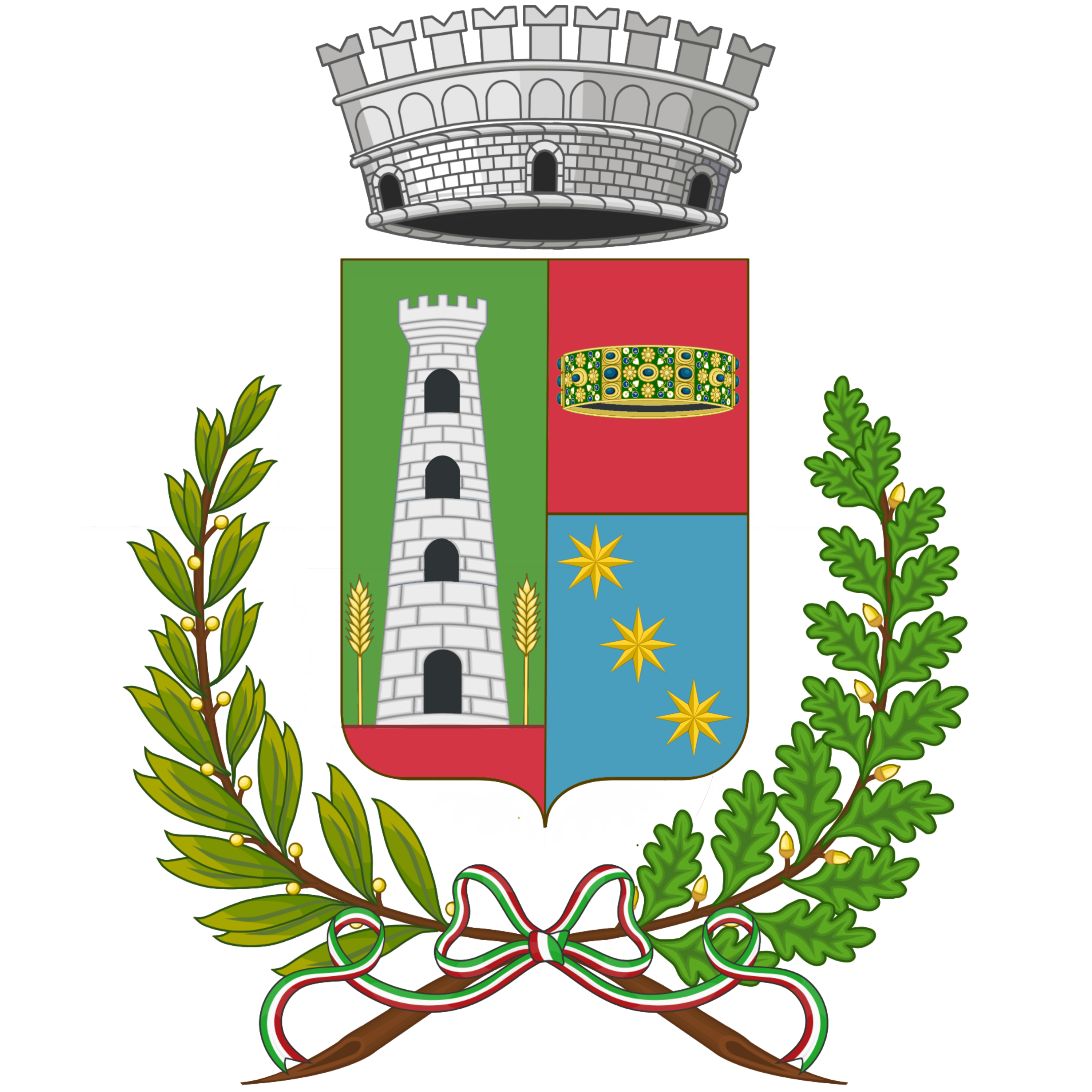
- Coat of arms

- Location within Italy Location within Lombardy
- Coordinates: 45°57′N 9°5′E
- Country: Italy
- Region: Lombardy
- Province: Como (CO)

Government
  - Mayor: Oscar Enrico Gandola

Area
  - Total: 5.5 km^{2} (2.1 sq mi)
- Elevation: 562 m (1,844 ft)

Population (31 March 2017)
  - Total: 552
  - Density: 100/km^{2} (260/sq mi)
- Demonym: Ceranesi
- Time zone: UTC+1 (CET)
  - Summer (DST): UTC+2 (CEST)
- Postal code: 22020
- Dialing code: 031
- Patron saint: St. Thomas the Apostle
- Saint day: 3 July
- Website: Official website

Cerano d'Intelvi (Comasco: Sceran [ʃeˈrãː]) is a comune (municipality) in the Province of Como in the Italian region Lombardy, located about 50 kilometres (31 mi) north of Milan and about 15 kilometres (9 mi) north of Como, on the border with Switzerland.

Cerano d'Intelvi borders the following municipalities: Cabbio (Switzerland), Centro Valle Intelvi, Dizzasco, Muggio (Switzerland), Schignano.
