= Carate =

Carate may refer to:

== Italian municipalities ==
- Carate Brianza, in the Province of Monza and Brianza, Lombardy
- Carate Urio, in the Province of Como, Lombard

== Other ==
- Carate, Costa Rica, small touristic town in Costa Rica, in the Osa Peninsula.
- Carate (disease)
