= Pigra =

- Comune
- Comune di Pigra
- Location within Italy Location within Lombardy
- Coordinates: 45°57′N 9°7′E
- Country: Italy
- Region: Lombardy
- Province: Province of Como (CO)

Area
  - Total: 4.3 km^{2} (1.7 sq mi)
- Elevation: 881 m (2,890 ft)

Population (Dec. 2004)
  - Total: 294
  - Density: 68/km^{2} (180/sq mi)
- Time zone: UTC+1 (CET)
  - Summer (DST): UTC+2 (CEST)
- Postal code: 22020
- Dialing code: 031

Pigra is a comune (municipality) in the Province of Como in the Italian region Lombardy, located about 50 kilometres (31 mi) north of Milan and about 15 kilometres (9 mi) north of Como. Located at 881 metres (2,890 ft) above sea level, with a panoramic view on Lake Como, the town is accessible by paved road from Argegno, winds along the Valle d'Intelvi and by cable railway, which in five minutes exceeds a drop of 540 metres (1,770 ft), allowing access to the village directly from Argegno. As of 31 December 2004, it had a population of 294 and an area of 4.3 square kilometres (1.7 mi^{2}).

Pigra borders the following municipalities: Argegno, Blessagno, Colonno, Dizzasco, Laino.

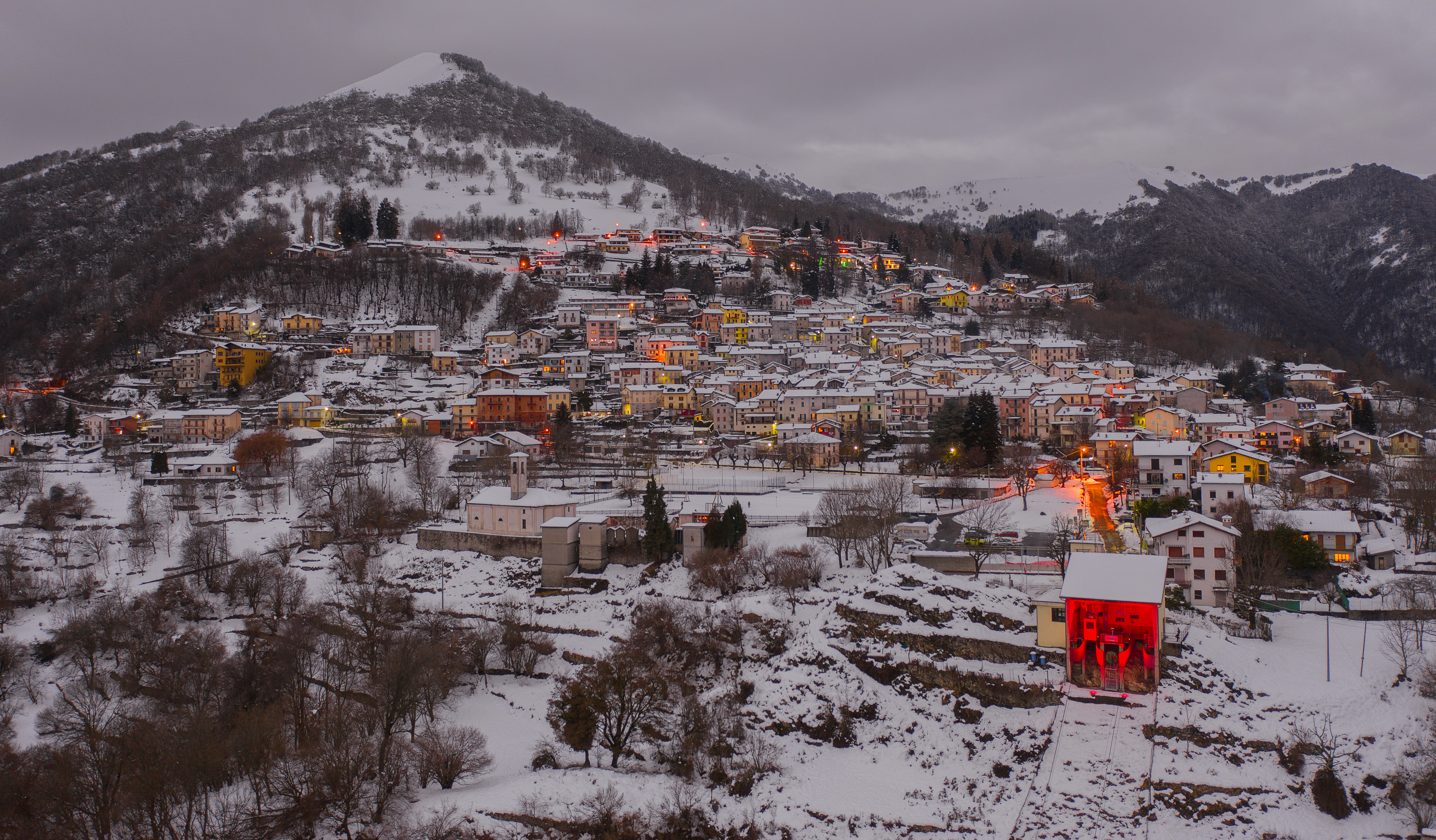
Pigra

== Demographic evolution ==
Historical population

Year	Pop.	±%
1861	458	—
1871	461	+0.7%
1881	512	+11.1%
1901	594	+16.0%
1911	624	+5.1%

Year	Pop.	±%
1921	650	+4.2%
1931	578	−11.1%
1936	554	−4.2%
1951	501	−9.6%
1961	496	−1.0%

Year	Pop.	±%
1971	457	−7.9%
1981	405	−11.4%
1991	388	−4.2%
2001	302	−22.2%

Source: Data from ISTAT
