= Livio Retti =

Italian painter (1692–1751)

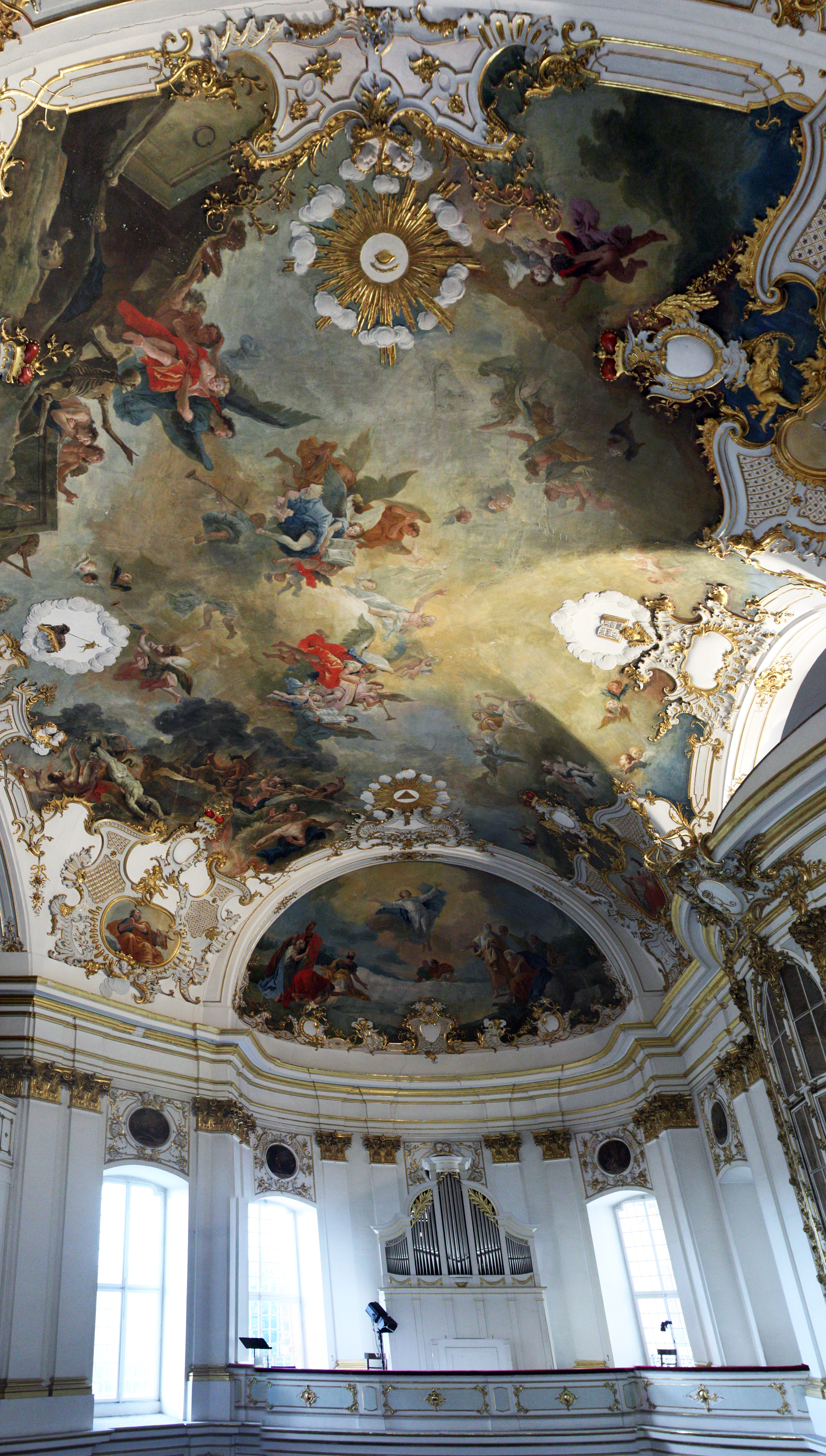
Fresco of the Chapel of the Order at Ludwigsburg Palace

Livio Retti (30 November 1692 – 2 January 1751) was an Italian Baroque painter who worked mainly in present-day South Germany, at the time the Duchy of Württemberg, the Duchy of Bavaria, some secular or ecclesiastical Franconian principalities and some free imperial cities such as Schwäbisch Hall.

== Origin and family ==
The Retti illustrated in Germany and the Czech Republic the emigration of Italian artists to Europe from the Alpine valleys near Como, such as the Marca, of Franche-Comté or the Landi and Resti of Hungary. Leaving their families in their native villages, where they may or may not return at the end of their lives, the children of a few families of Italian marble workers or stucco workers were apprenticed to a master who had already left, usually from his own family. The apprentice followed his master wherever he went. There he met the other apprentices. Between them, there were contracts and worksites. It was not uncommon for brothers to work together in the same specialization; they married girls from associated families and were highly mobile from their respective points of attachment. Over time, the disciplines became more specialized and complex, so that the members of the siblings were no longer as versatile as in the 16th century. The architect, although himself versed in painting or stucco, gradually took on a dominant hierarchical role and distributed the tasks.

Retti was indeed from a family of artists:

- his father was Lorenzo Mattia Retti, he was a stucco master
- His brother Donato Riccardo Retti was also a stucco artist (He was with Emanuele Pighini the interior designer of the baroque interior of the collegiate church of Ellwangen
- his brothers Leopoldo and Paolo Retti were both architects
- His uncle Donato Giuseppe Frisoni was a master stucco artist and architect.

It was his uncle Frisoni who changed the fate of the Retti family by accepting the contract offered to him by Eberhard Louis, Duke of Württemberg for the construction and completion of his new Ludwigsburg Palace which would become one of the largest baroque castles in Germany. Previously, Frisoni worked as a stucco craftsman in Prague. Indeed, once he had settled in Ludwigsburg, he brought to his adopted town his extended family from Laino in Lombardy, Province of Como. The amount of work was gigantic in Southern Germany, whose taste for Baroque art reached its peak during the period of the Counter-Reformation. Italian artists collaborated with artists and craftsmen from Bohemia, especially from the Baroque city of Prague, and some families of craftsmen from Franconia and Württemberg such as the Dientzenhofer.

The Retti were no exception because there were other Italian artists, travelling or not, who worked on construction sites in southern German-speaking countries and especially in Prague. The families of stuccoers and craftsmen from the Val d'Intelvi, in the Como region, merged and helped each other, among them the Carloni, the Retti, the Scotti, the Aliprandi, the Barberini, the Quaglio, all of them from Laino like the Frisonis.

In Schwäbisch Hall the Retti met the Italian sculptors Emmanuelo Pighini and Tomaso Gavoni who created the statues of the entrance hall of the new city hall.

== Works ==
Retti was appointed painter of the court of Württemberg in 1732 and in 1743, he was appointed court painter of the Electoral Palatinate.

He specialized in mural paintings and mainly frescoes of church ceilings or official buildings representative of the regional nobility.

His uncle first called him for the decoration of the Ludwigsburg Palace. His major work is the fresco of the ceiling of the Ordenskapelle in the ducal residence.

Through the work-sharing of the sites between parenteles and associated craftsmen's families, Retti also participated in the decoration of the castles of Ansbach, Bad Mergentheim and Würzburg where in particular worked his brother Leopoldo Retti, chief architect of Württemberg since 1750 and a specialist in rococo architecture such as the Retti-Palais in Ansbach.

=== Schwäbisch Hall ===
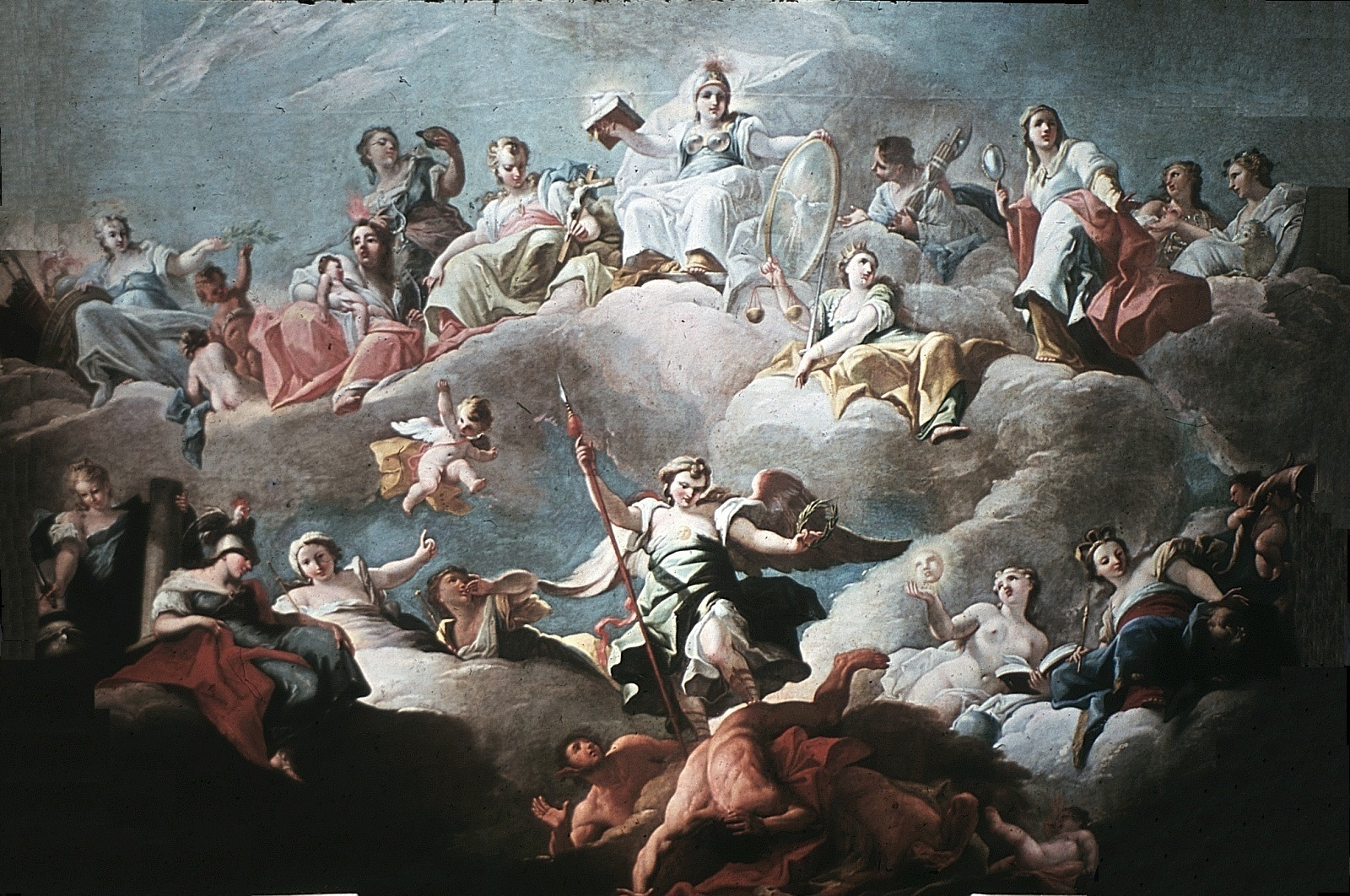
"Victory of virtue over vices" on the ceiling of the Great Council Chamber of City Hall in Schwäbisch Hall.

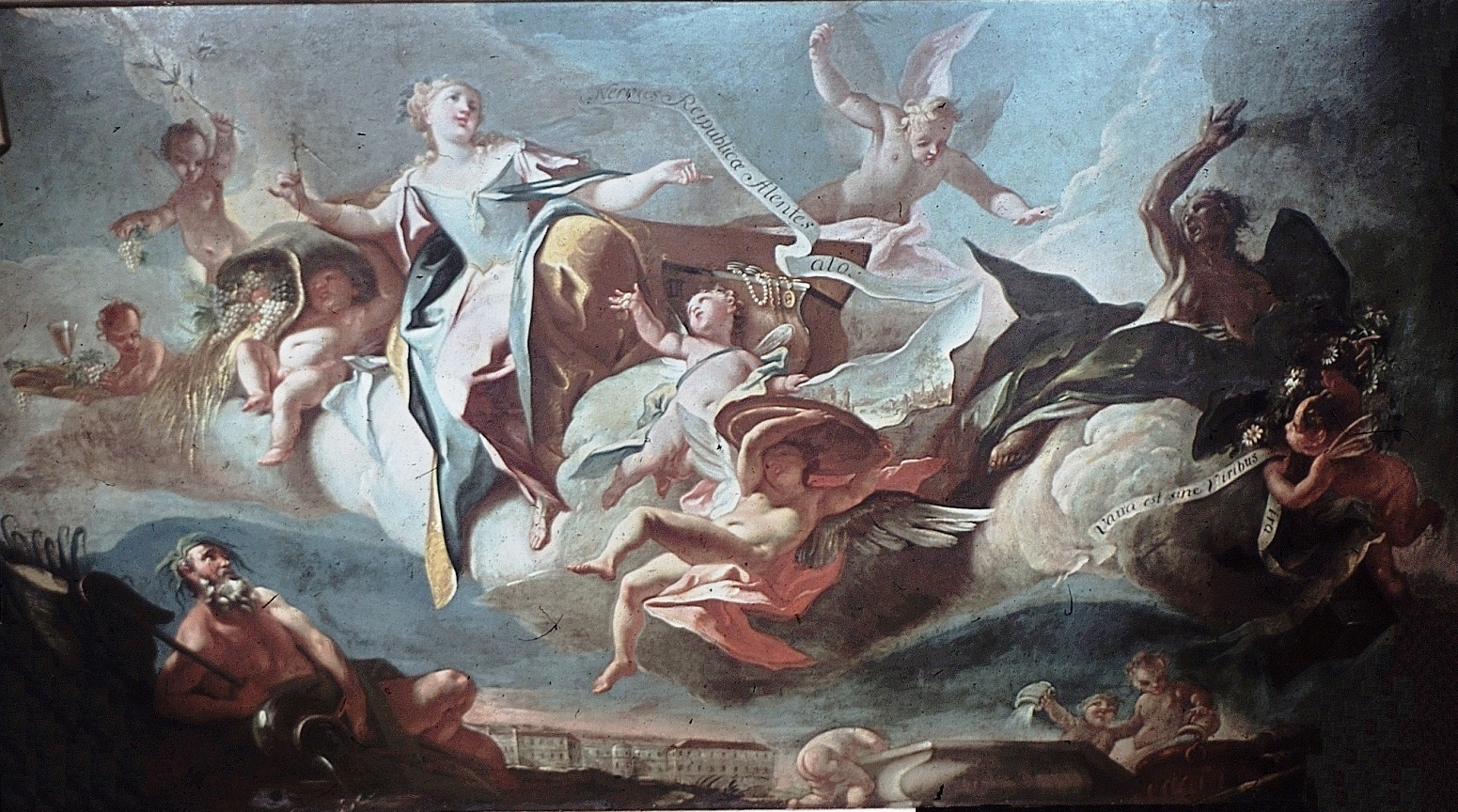
Allegory of the city of Hall and its prosperity.

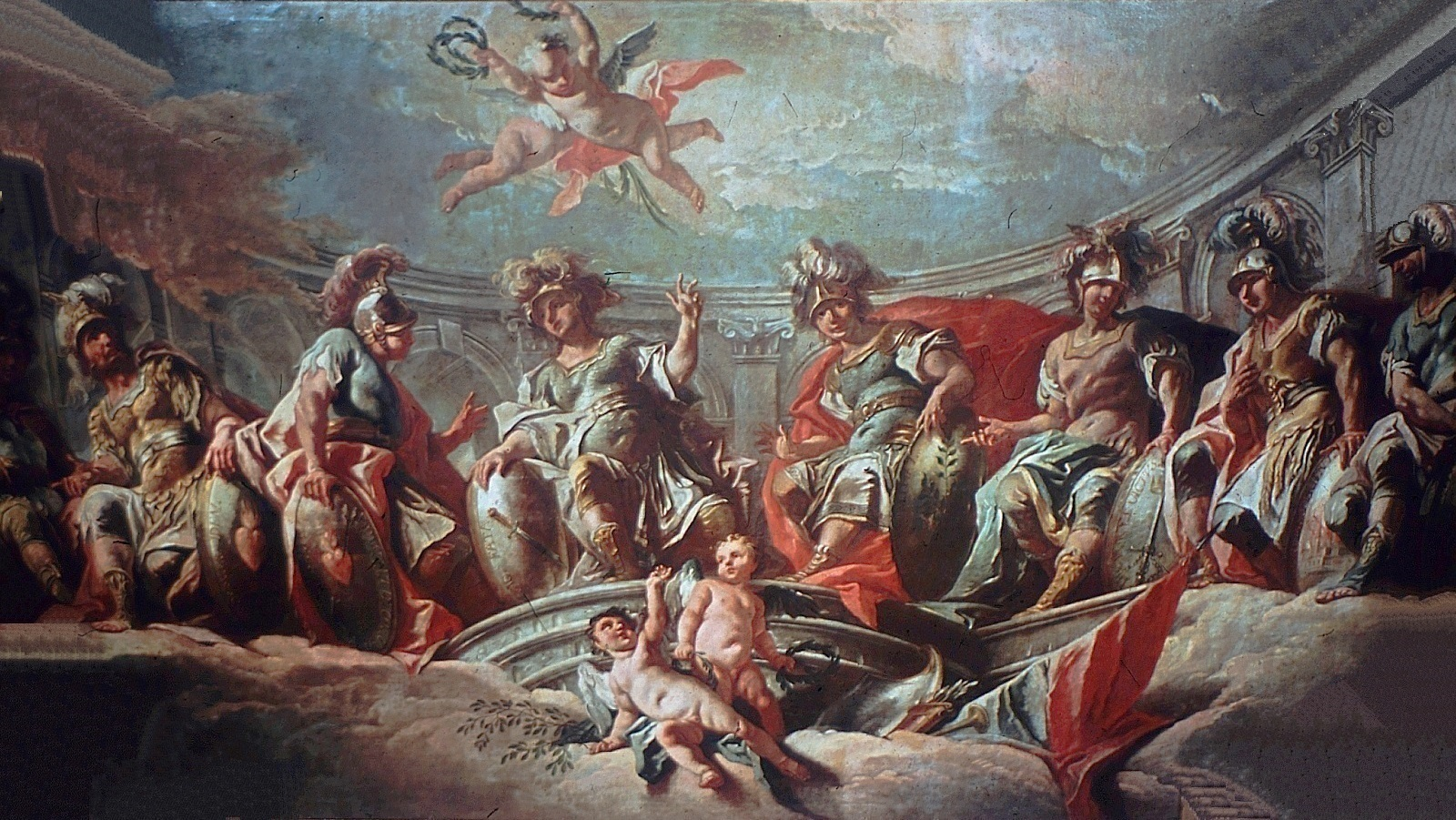
Oil painting on the ceiling of the hero room of the town hall of Schwäbisch Hall: Greek and Roman heroes.

Between 1736 and 1738, Retti was called by the advisers of the free imperial city of Schwäbisch Hall for the interior decoration of the new Baroque town hall which was built on the site of a Franciscan convent church devastated by a fire in the city in 1728.

Retti painted 22 murals in the town hall of Schwäbisch Hall whose rooms were originally equipped with parquet floors with sculpted benches.

These were actually oil paintings on canvas that were stretched on ceilings or walls. He did not paint a fresco directly on the wall after treatment. His paintings were then framed by a stucco decoration, often representing naturalistic motifs, and decorated with figurative medallions. After the fire, traces of wall paintings were found directly below Retti's oil paintings; they represented landscapes of Hall, Limpurg, Vellberg and the Comburg.

The current paintings in the City Hall are copies. There are three rooms:

- the heroes' room;
  - Alexander the Great destroys the Gordian knot (wall)
  - Aeneas saves his father Anchises from Troy on fire (wall)
  - The martyred death of Marcus Curtius (wall)
  - Achilles, Patroclus, Hector, Aeneas, Romulus, Caesar, Pompey, Scipio and Hannibal (ceiling)
- the Stettmeister Hall which revolves around the allegory of the city republic of Hall.
  - Allegory of the city of Hall and its prosperity (ceiling)
  - Allegory of merit with the Latin motto "Nemini sua munera claudit" (wall)
  - Allegory of the action with the Latin motto "Nemo otiosus!" (wall)
  - Architecture and Fine Arts of Schwäbisch Hall (wall)
  - Beneficence of Schwäbisch Hall (wall)
  - Agricultural life, crafts and industry in Schwäbisch Hall (wall)
- the Council Room is decorated mainly with biblical motifs such as the Last Judgment.
  - Joseph and his brothers (right wall)
  - The sacrifice of Isaac (right wall)
  - The judgment of Solomon (left wall)
  - Jacob's fight with the angel on the banks of the Jabbok (left wall)
  - Pharaoh's daughter saves Moses (wall)
  - Samson's fight with the lion (door top)
  - David and Jonathan's oath against Saul (door top)
  - The request of Semeis to David (top of door)
  - Victory of virtue over vices or Victory of Christianity over paganism (ceiling)

In the music room (Musiksaal) is the Allegory of music and the five senses.

Retti also realized the allegory entitled "The Beneficial Power of Fire". and the allegory entitled "The destructive power of fire".

Retti's original works in Schwäbisch hall no longer exist. They were destroyed by a fire that ravaged the interior of City Hall after an incendiary bombing on April 16, 1945. The renovation of the building was completed in 1955.

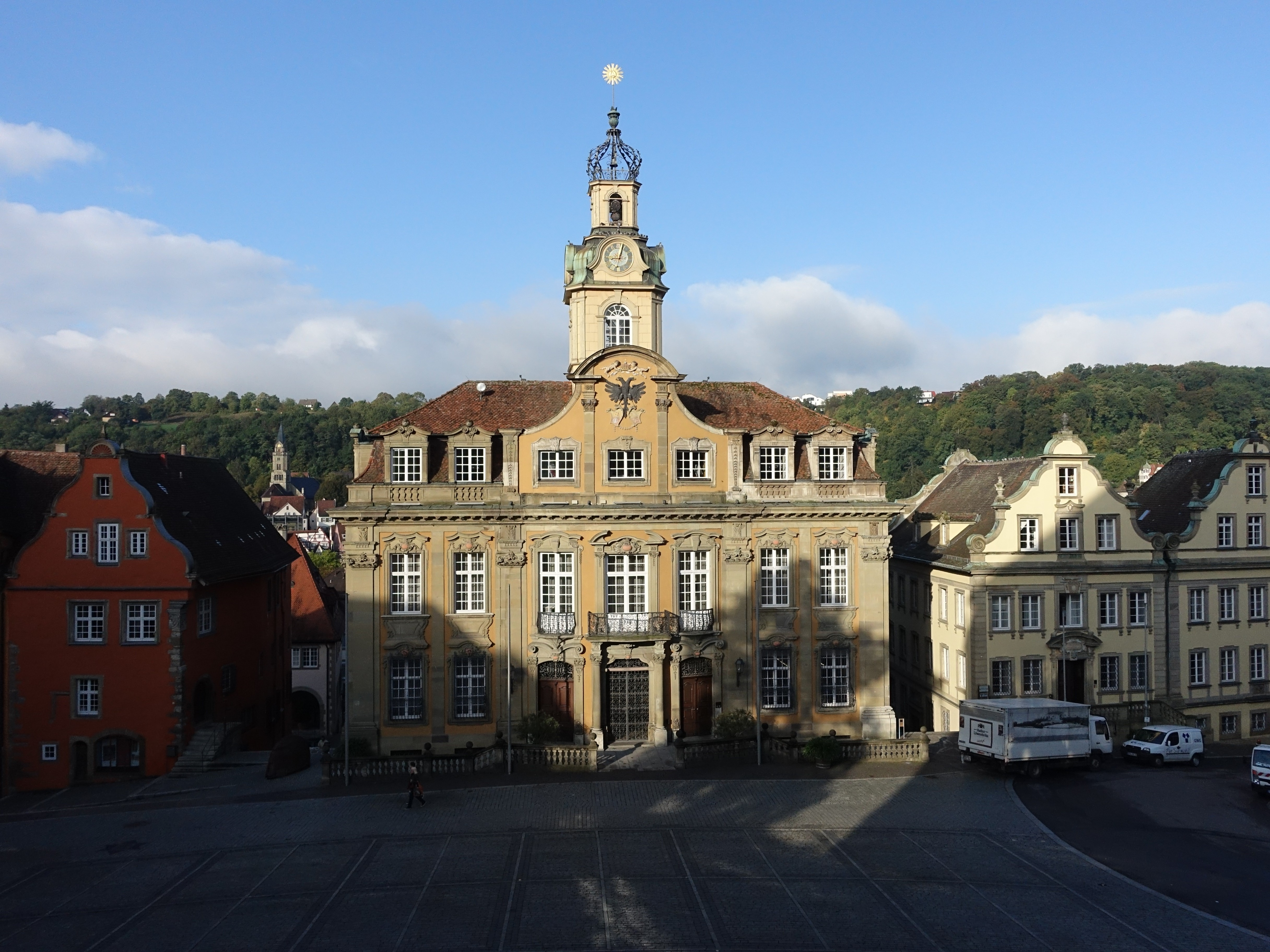
Schwäbisch Hall - City Hall, inner decoration by Retti.

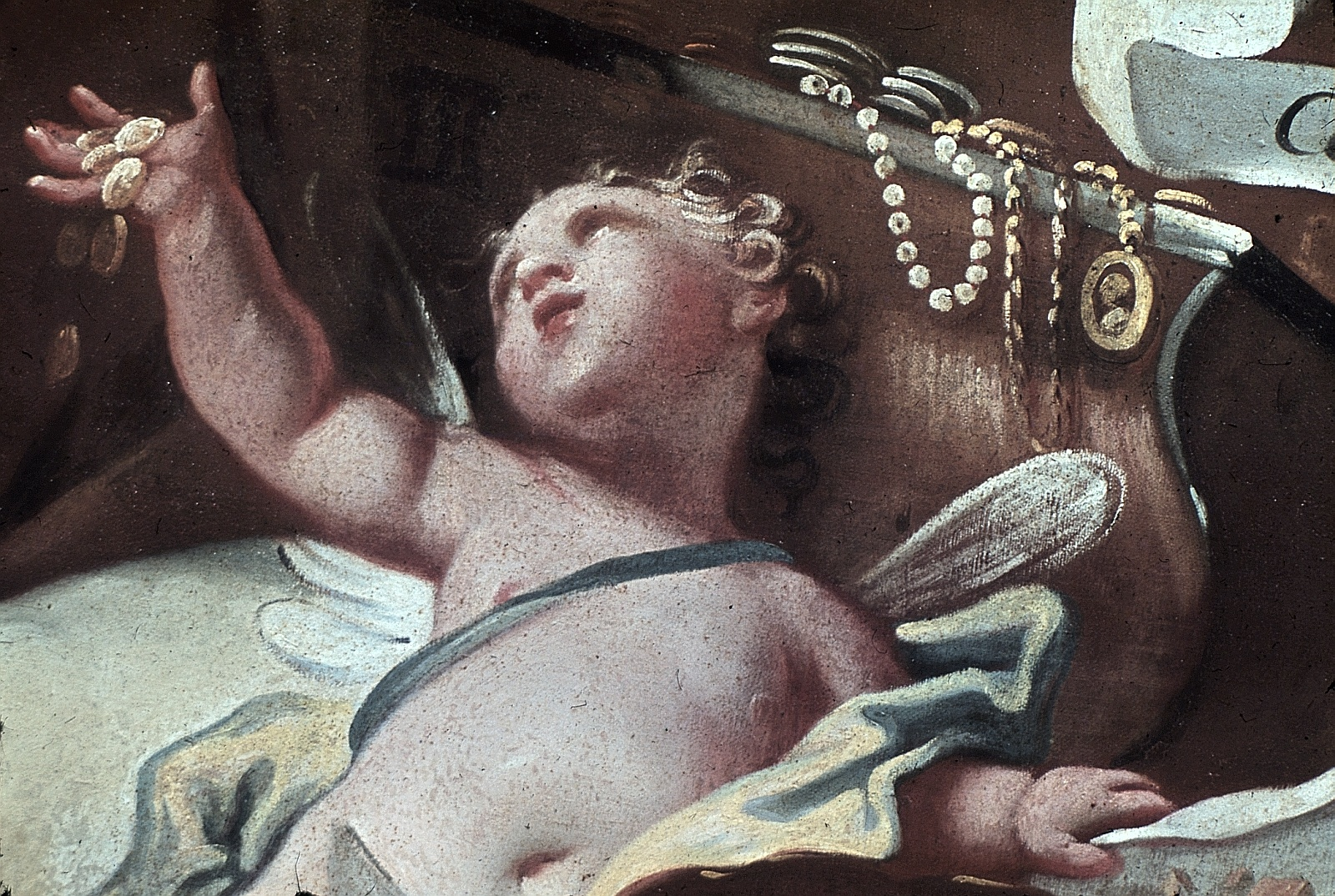
Schwäbisch Hall, Town Hall, ceiling of the Stettmeister's Hall, taken from the "Allegory of Hall City and its prosperity."

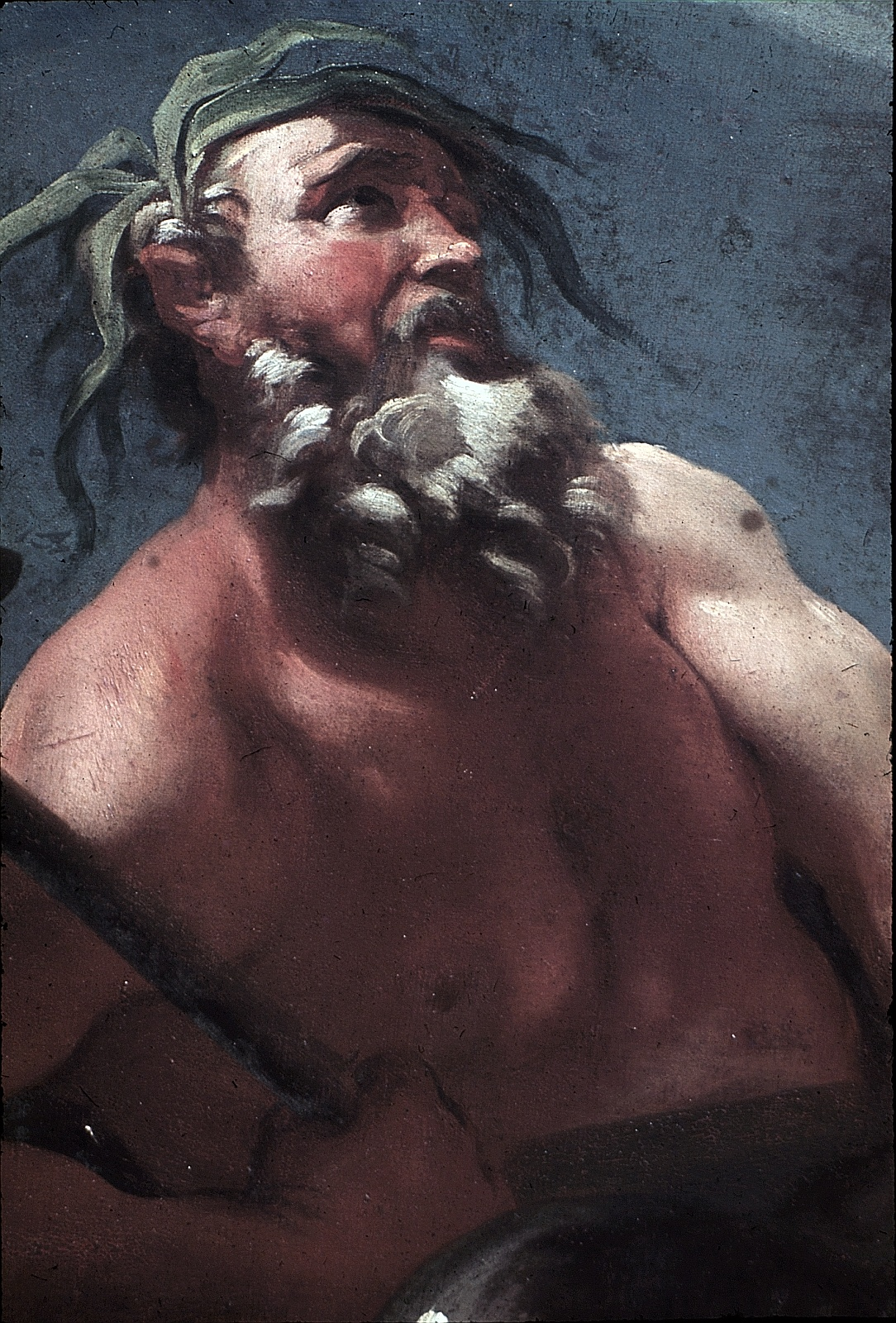
Schwäbisch Hall, Town Hall, ceiling of the Stettmeister's Hall, taken from the "Allegory of Hall City and its prosperity."

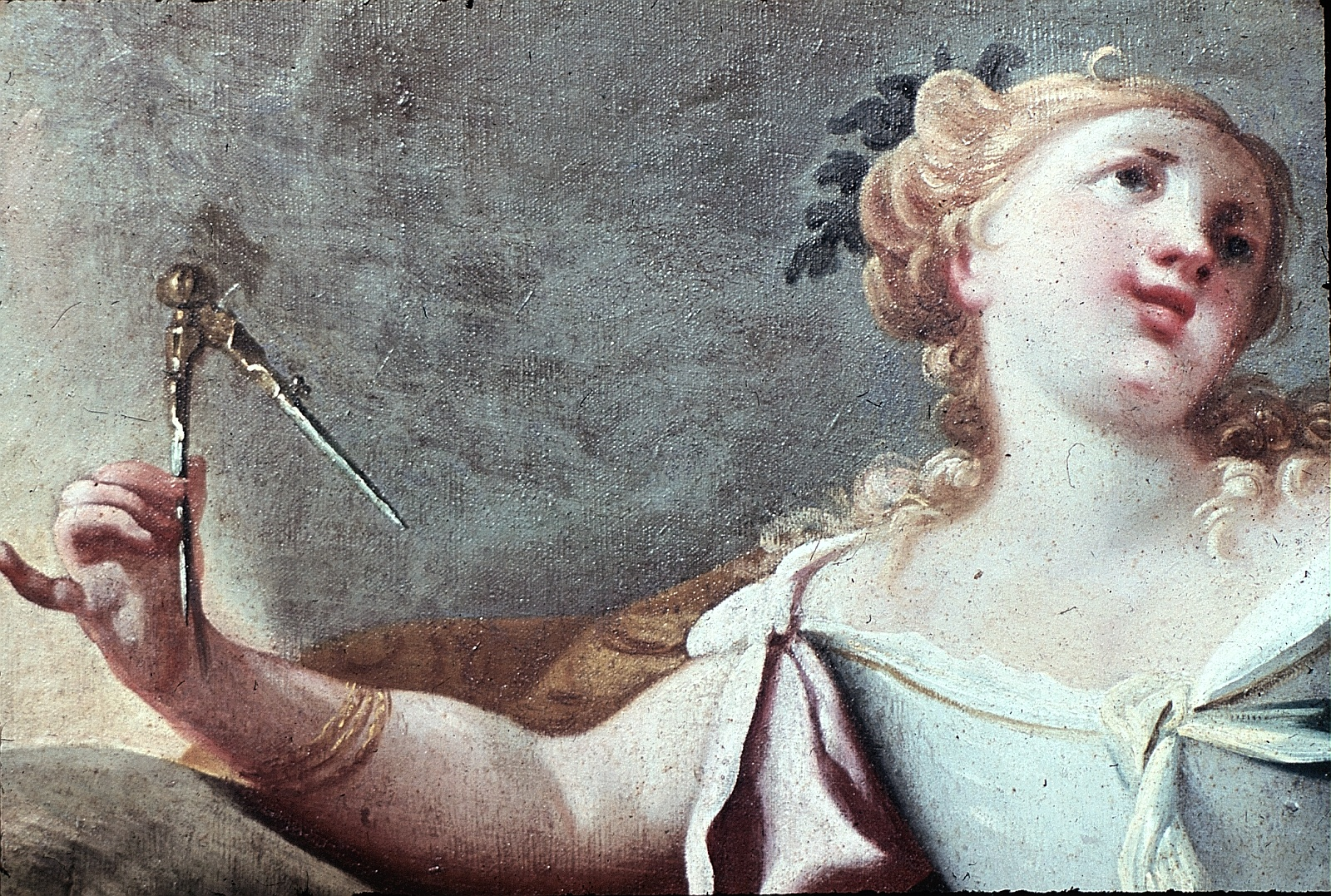
Schwäbisch Hall, Town Hall, ceiling of the Stettmeister's Hall, taken from the "Allegory of Hall City and its prosperity."

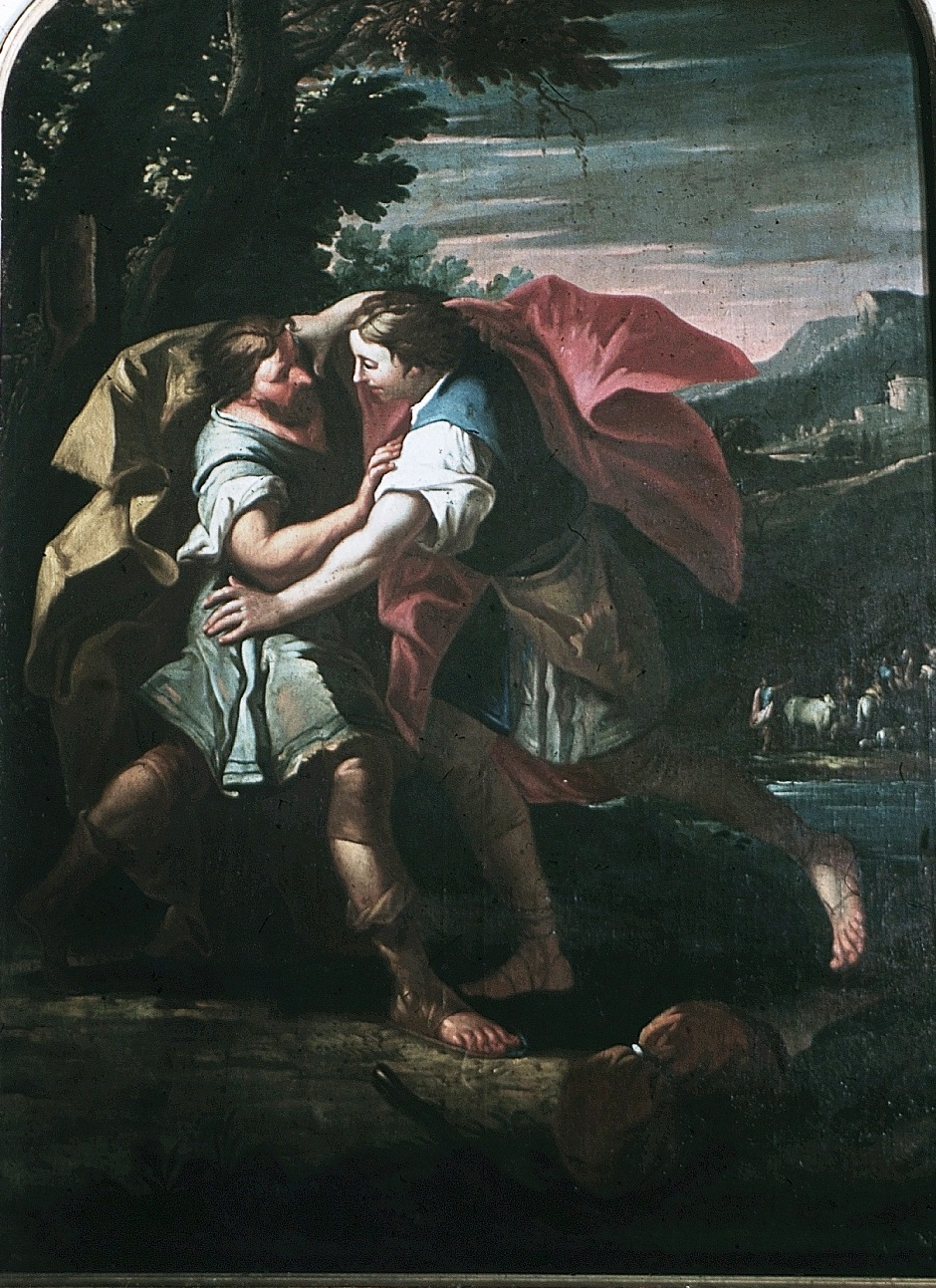
Schwäbisch Hall, City Hall, Council Chamber ceiling, from Jacob's night fight with the Angel of God on the banks of the Jabbok.

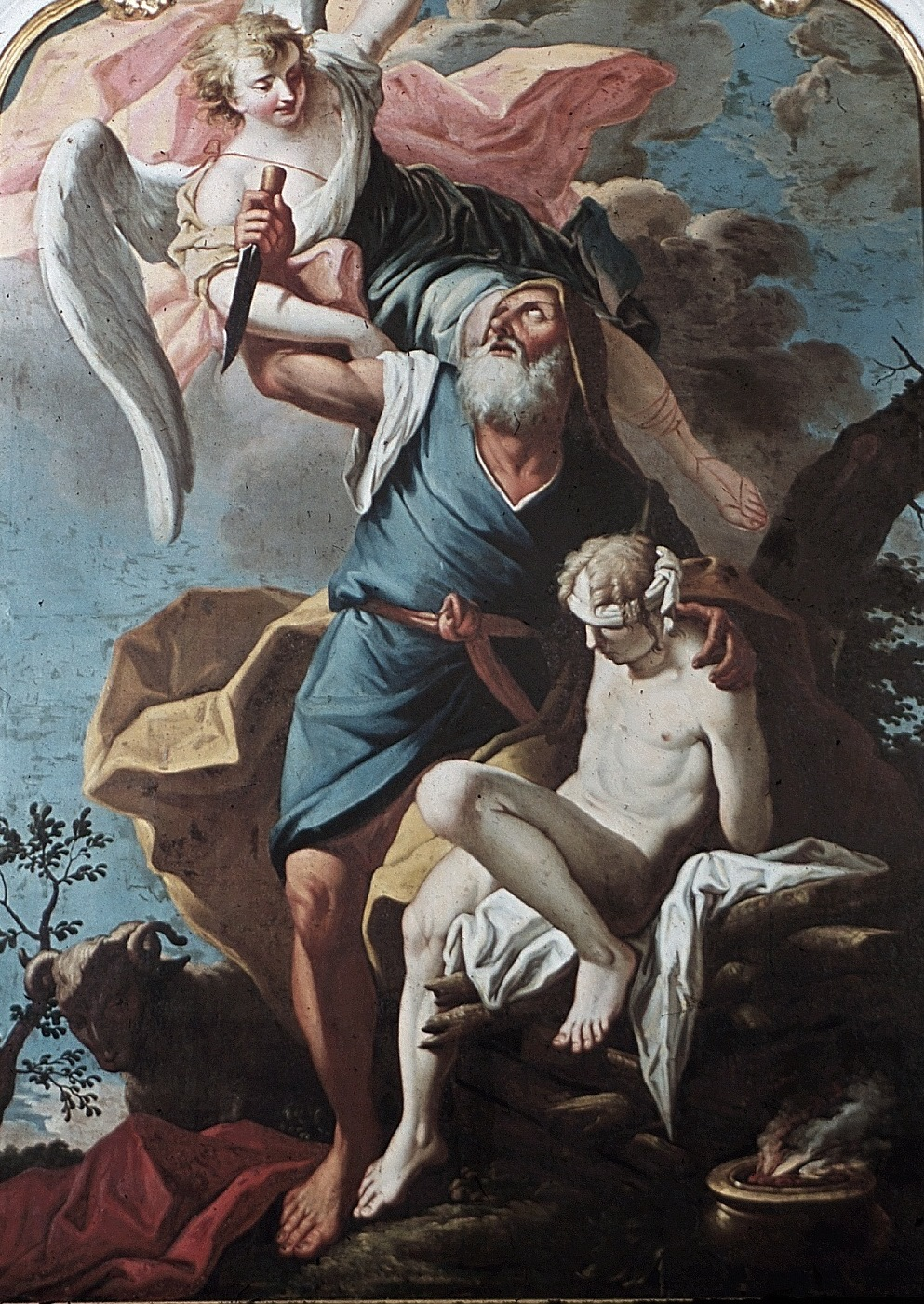
Schwäbisch Hall, City Hall, Council Chamber wall, Excerpt from Isaac's Sacrifice.

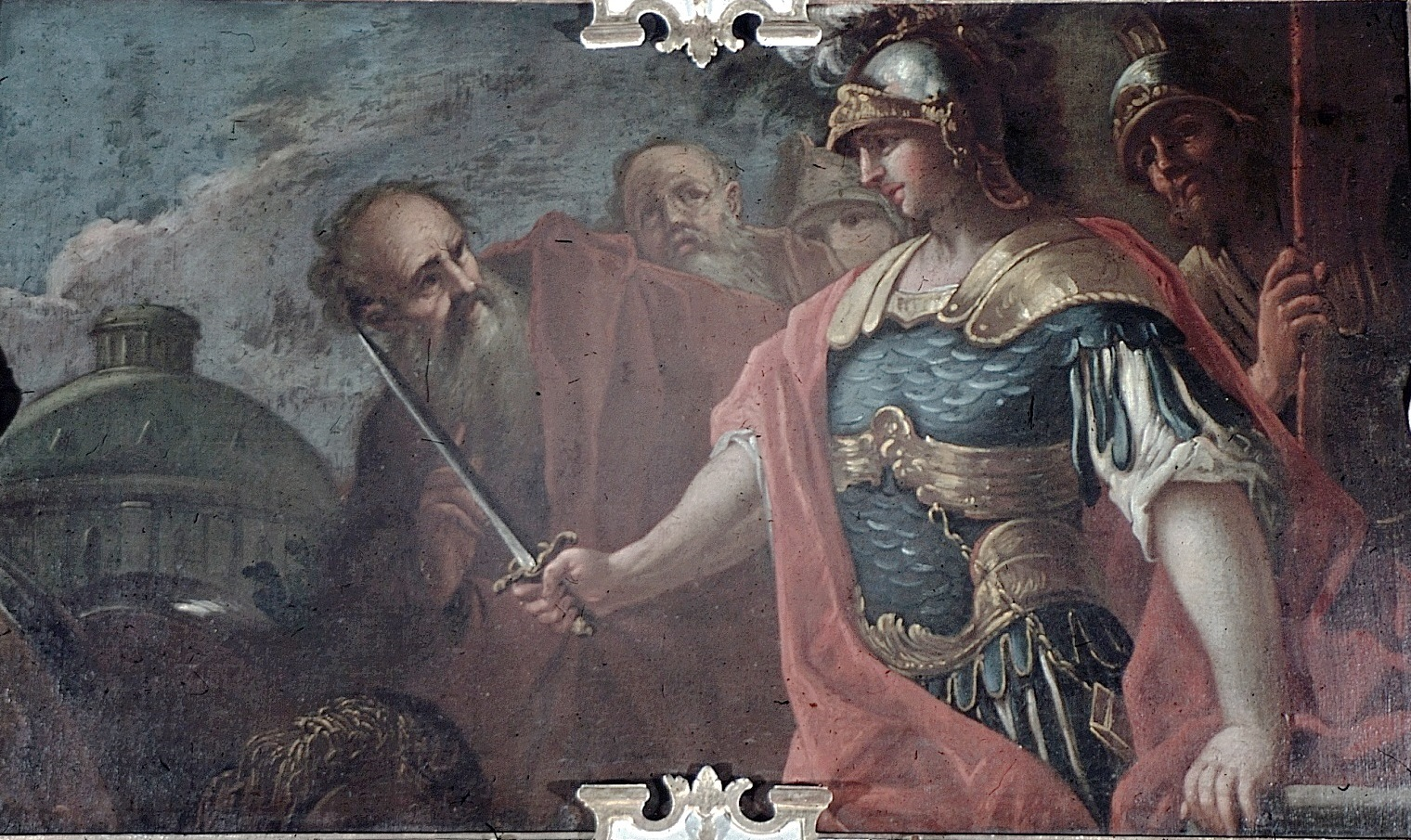
Schwäbisch Hall, City Hall, Hero Hall ceiling, Alexander the Great.
