= Cernobbio =

Cernobbio Cernòbi (Lombard)
- Comune
- Città di Cernobbio
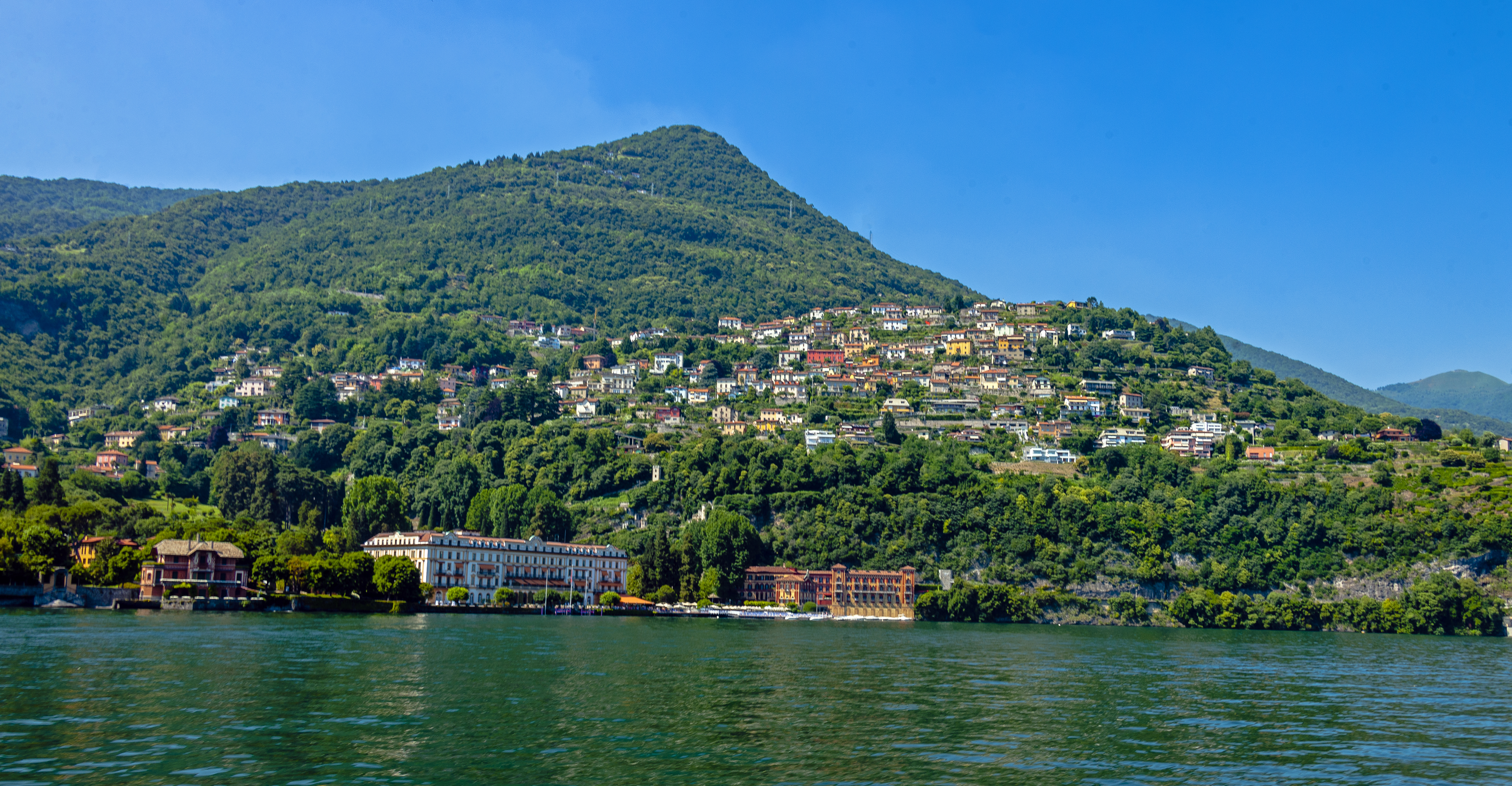
- Panorama of Cernobbio

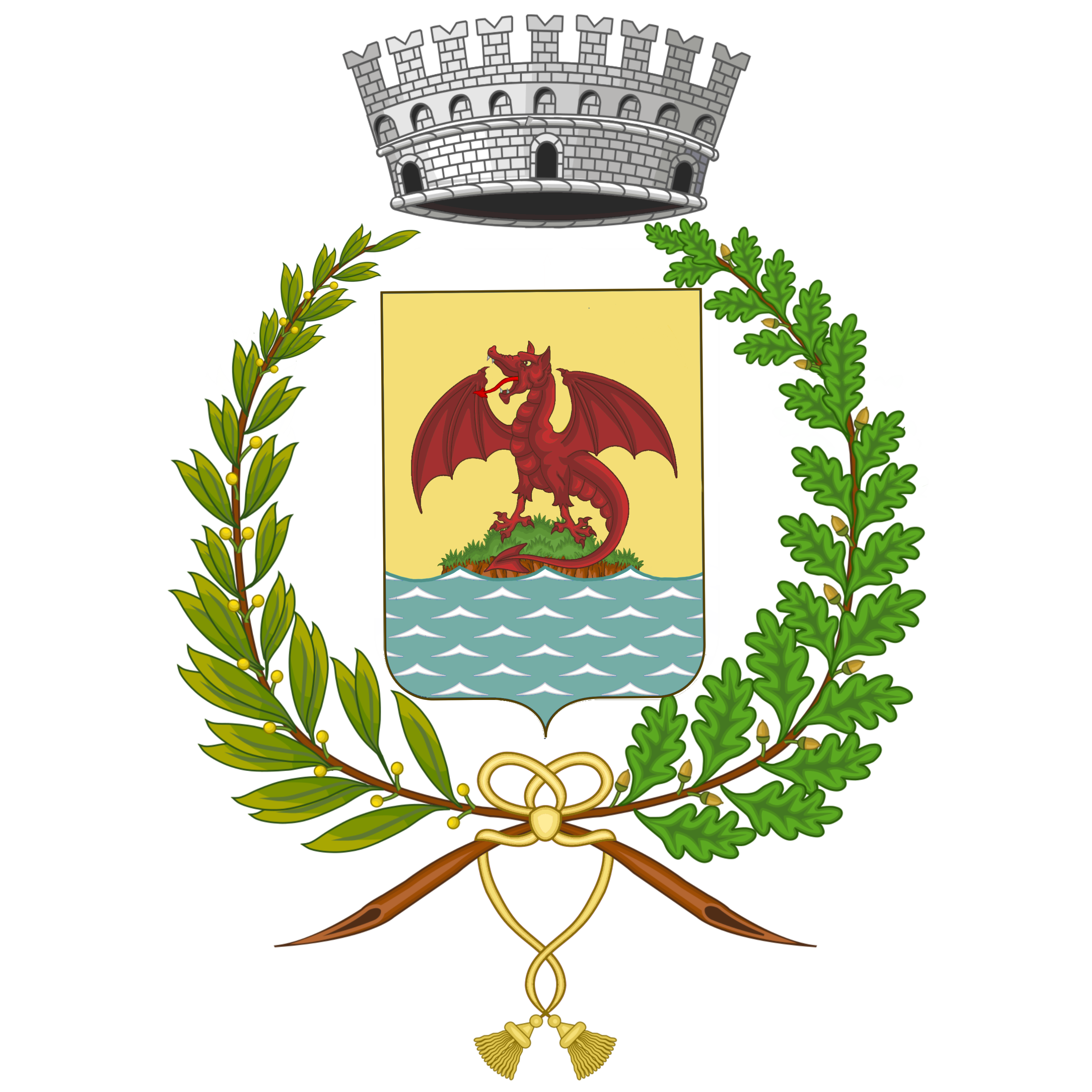
- Coat of arms

- Location within Italy Location within Lombardy
- Coordinates: 45°50′N 9°4′E
- Country: Italy
- Region: Lombardy
- Province: Como (CO)
- Frazioni: Piazza Santo Stefano, Rovenna, Casnedo, Gentrino, Madrona, Mornello, Olzino, Stimianico, Toldino

Government
  - Mayor: Matteo Monti

Area
  - Total: 11.7 km^{2} (4.5 sq mi)
- Elevation: 202 m (663 ft)

Population (31 December 2010)
  - Total: 7,059
  - Density: 603/km^{2} (1,560/sq mi)
- Demonym: Cernobbiesi
- Time zone: UTC+1 (CET)
  - Summer (DST): UTC+2 (CEST)
- Postal code: 22012
- Dialing code: 031
- Website: Official website

Cernobbio (Comasco: Cernòbi [tʃerˈnɔbi]) is a comune (municipality) in the province of Como, Lombardy, northern Italy. It is located about 40 kilometres (25 mi) north of Milan and about 2 kilometres (1 mi) northwest of Como, on the border with Switzerland and near Lake Como. The highest peak is the Monte Bisbino, at 1,325 metres (4,347 ft).

Cernobbio borders the following municipalities: Blevio, Breggia (Switzerland), Como, Maslianico, Moltrasio, and Vacallo (Switzerland).

Cernobbio received the honorary title of city with a presidential decree on May 24, 2005.

== Events ==
Since 1975, every year in early September the city of Cernobbio has hosted the Ambrosetti Forum, an international economic conference.

== Transport and tourism ==
Cernobbio is a stopping point on the bus and ferry services that link Como to Colico via the west side of Lake Como. It is the starting point for the long-distance footpath La Via dei Monti Lariani.

== See also ==
- Villa Erba
- Villa d'Este, Cernobbio
  - Concorso d'Eleganza Villa d'Este
- Ambrosetti Forum
- La Via dei Monti Lariani
- RIO Models
