= Laglio =

Laglio Lài (Lombard)
- Comune
- Comune di Laglio
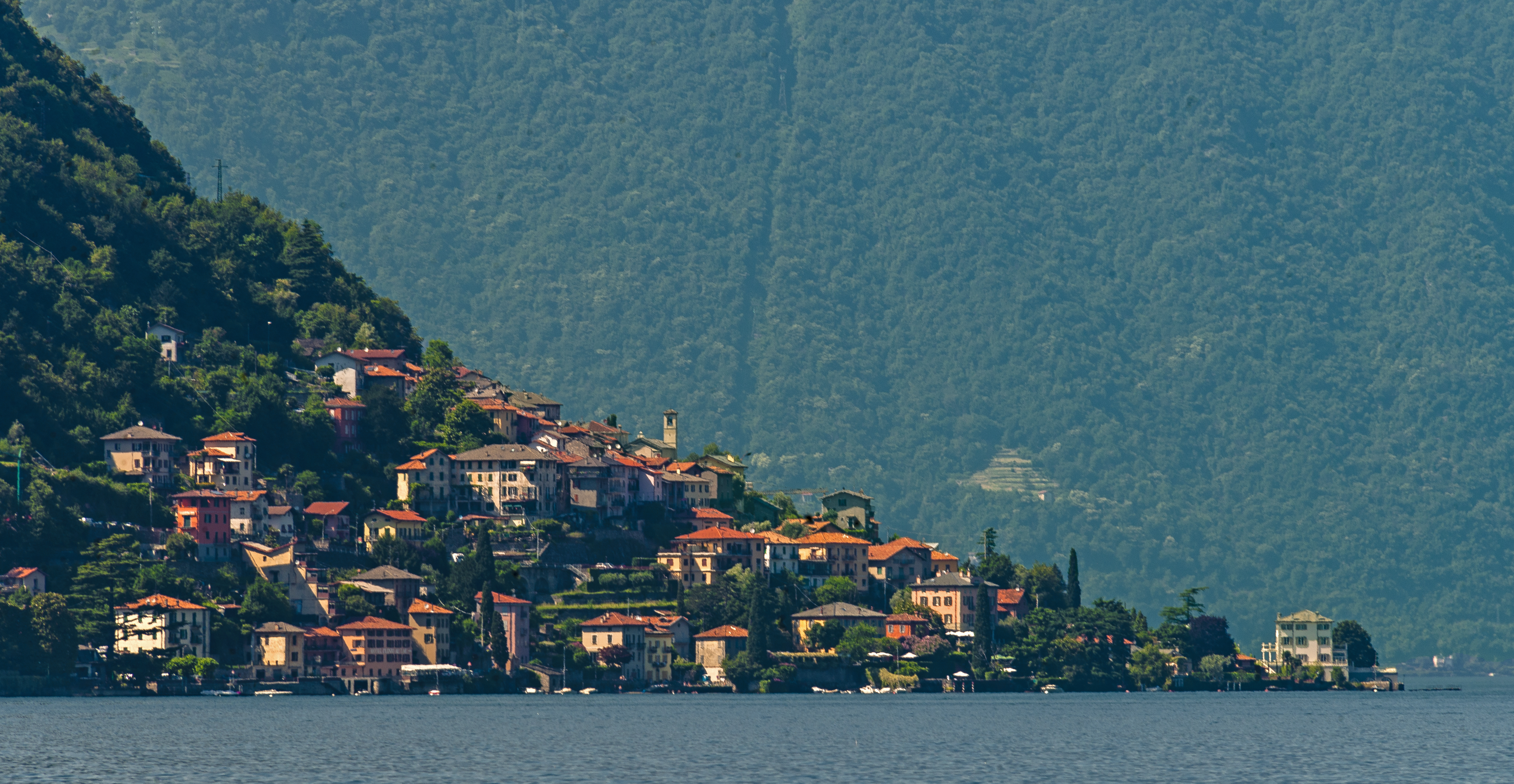

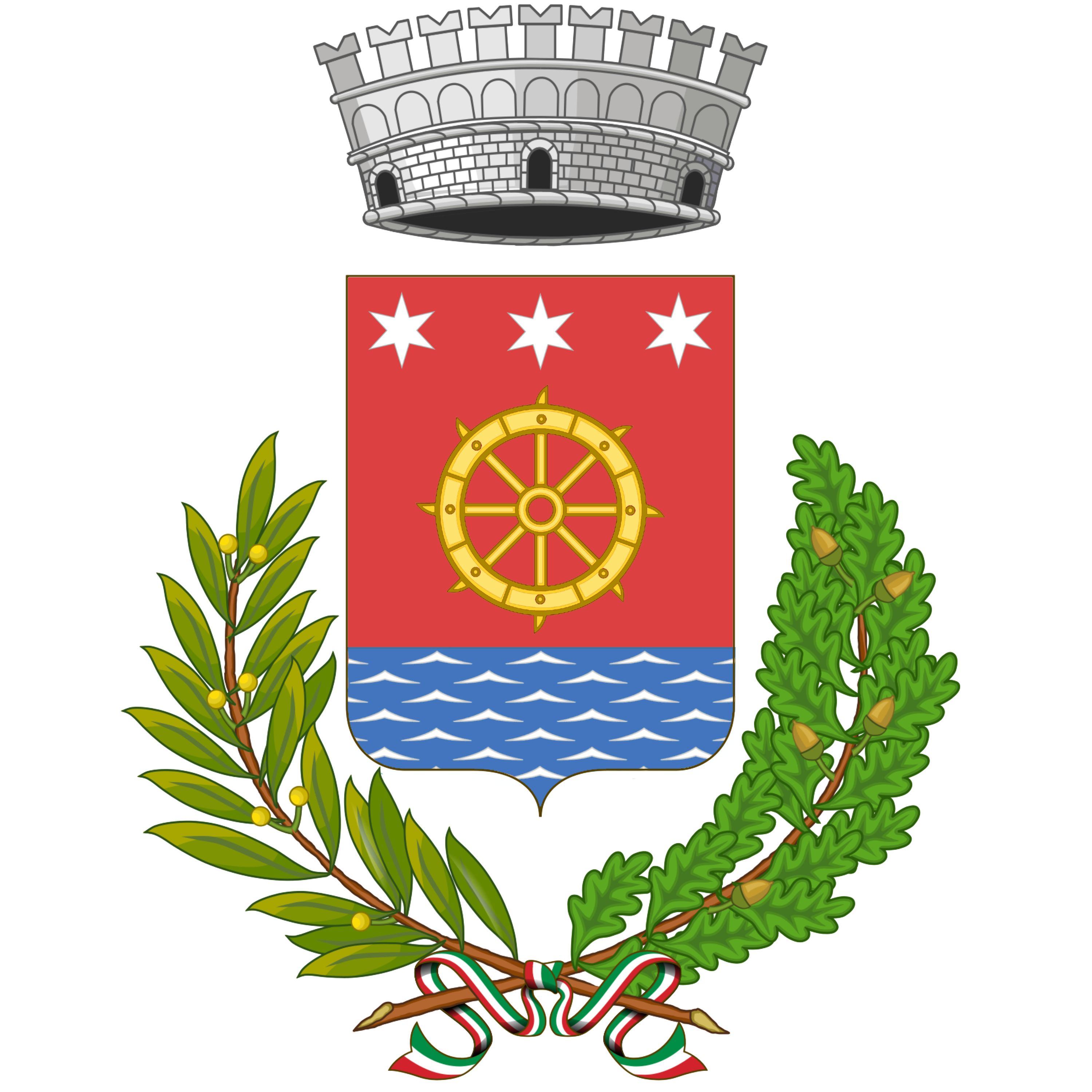
- Coat of arms

- Location within Italy Location within Lombardy
- Coordinates: 45°53′N 9°8′E
- Country: Italy
- Region: Lombardy
- Province: Como (CO)

Area
  - Total: 6 km^{2} (2.3 sq mi)
- Elevation: 200 m (660 ft)

Population (2018-01-01)
  - Total: 930
  - Density: 150/km^{2} (400/sq mi)
- Time zone: UTC+1 (CET)
  - Summer (DST): UTC+2 (CEST)
- Postal code: 22010
- Dialing code: 031
- Website: www.comune.laglio.co.it

Laglio (Italian: [ˈlaʎʎo]; Comasco: Lài [ˈlaj]) is an Italian comune of 930 inhabitants in the Province of Como in Lombardy. It is on the western shore of the south-western branch of Lake Como, 14 kilometres (9 mi) from the town of Como.

== Geography ==
The town is 199 metres (653 ft) above sea level and occupies a strip of land between Mount Colmegnone, 1,383 metres (4,537 ft) high, and the lake.

The town itself is made up of several hamlets: Germanello, Ossana, Soldino, Ticée, e Torriggia.

On the slopes of Mount Colmegnone above the hamlet of Torriggia is the famous "Bear Hole" cave (which can be visited upon request at the commune offices) within which were found the bones of Ursus spelaeus. The Bear Hole is made up of various rooms with partly unexplored underground lakes, and is rich in spring water.

== Infrastructure and transport ==
=== Roads and highways ===
Laglio is easily reached from Como on the SS340 Via Regina. Coming from Milan and Switzerland take the "Lago di Como" (previously "Como Nord") exit off the A9 and from there follow the signs to Menaggio.

=== Public transport ===
Laglio is served by ASF autolinee buses between Como and Argegno. The bus is numbered the C10/C20 and can be caught at both the bus station (next to Como Lago train station) and the main train station (Como San Giovanni)

== Administration ==
The mayor of Laglio is Roberto Pozzi, who was elected for his first term on 15 April 2008.

== Notable people ==
- George Clooney - owner of Villa Oleandra, previously owned by the Heinz family. The villa also served as the filming location for some scenes of the movie Ocean's Twelve. In June 2007, Clooney expressed opposition to a planned council development of the lakefront near his villa, and hosted a meeting of a local protest committee also opposed to the development.
