= San Fedele Intelvi =

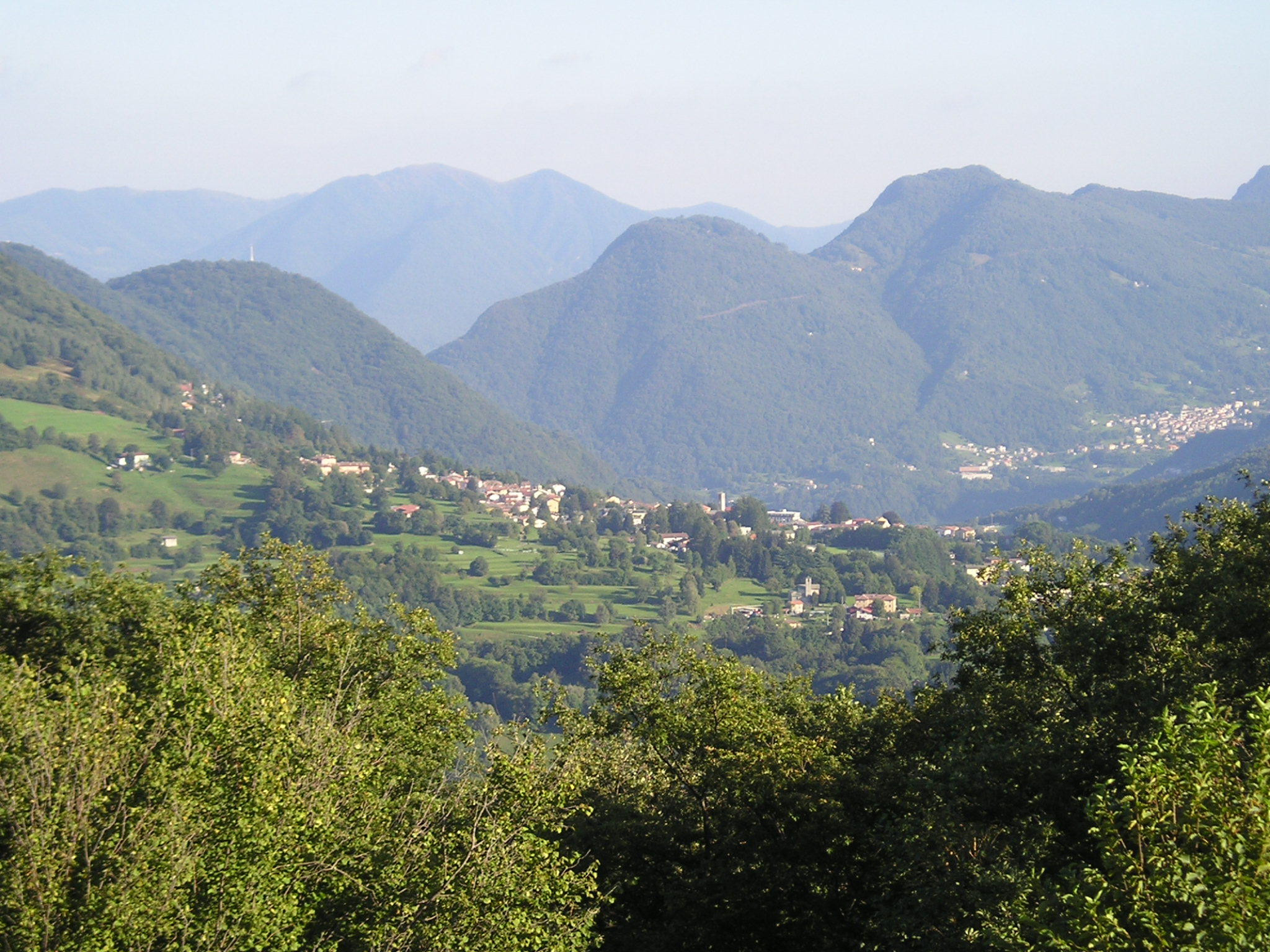
San Fedele d'Intelvi

San Fedele Intelvi was a comune (municipality) in the Province of Como in the Italian region Lombardy, located about 60 kilometres (37 mi) north of Milan and about 15 kilometres (9 mi) north of Como, on the border with Switzerland.

On 1 January 2018 it was merged with Casasco d'Intelvi and Castiglione d'Intelvi to form the new comune of Centro Valle Intelvi.
