= Villa Pliniana =

Building in Torno, Italy

Coordinates: 45.8579°N 9.1395°E

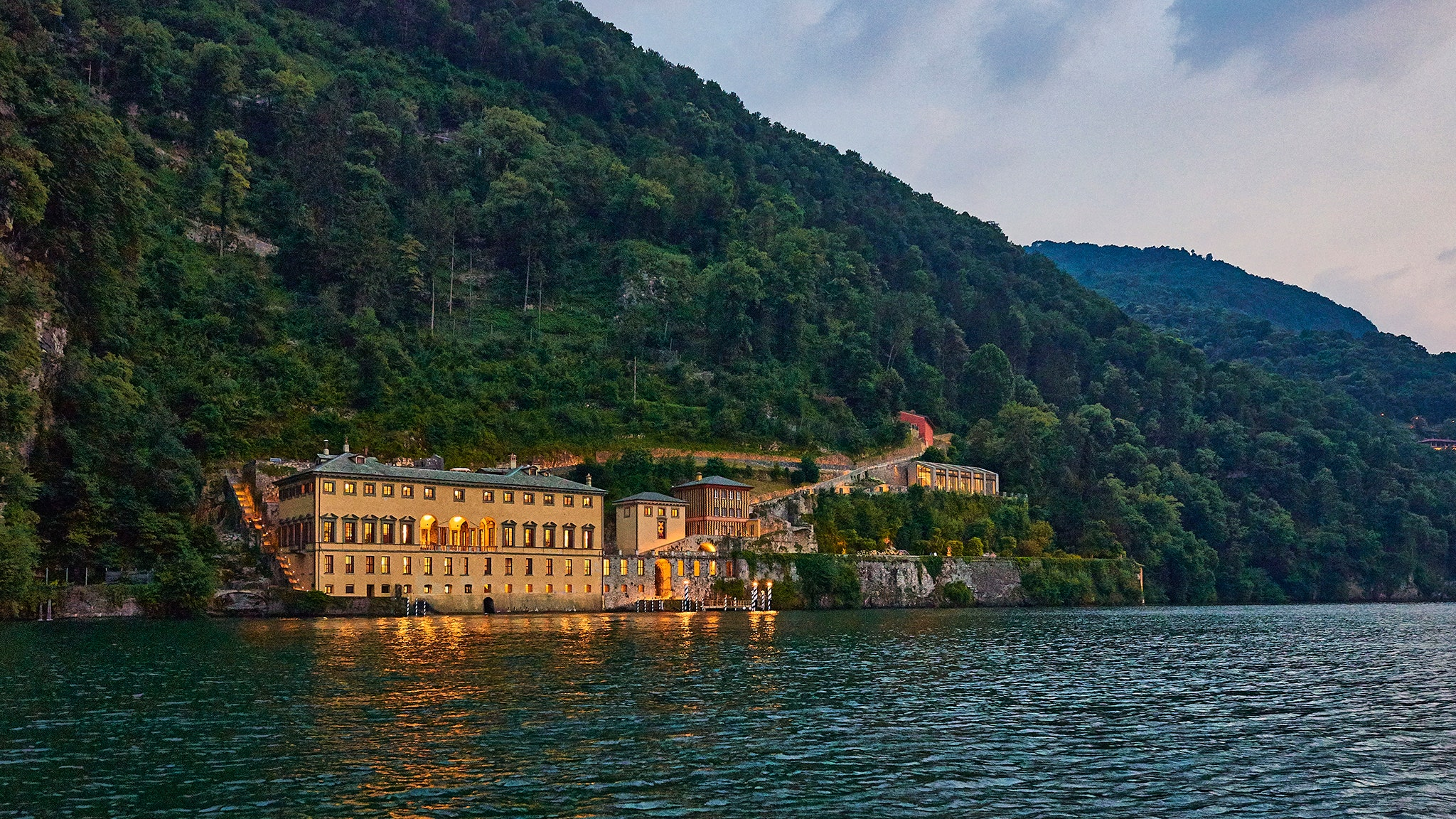
Villa Pliniana

Villa Pliniana is a villa originally built in 1573, on the site of a more modest pre-existing building, in the territory of the municipality of Torno, in the province of Como, on the right bank of the western branch of Lake Como.

== Fonte Pliniana ==
The villa, located in a wooded inlet of the lake, took its name from Pliny the Younger, who described an intermittent karst spring present there in a letter addressed to his friend Lucius Licinius Sura. An excerpt from the letter reads:

In place of a small gift from my hometown I have brought you a problem worthy of your very profound science. A spring arises from the mountain, descends through the rocks, collects in a small room suitable for lunch, cut by hand of man. After holding back for a while, it falls into Lake Lario. It has a strange nature: three times a day it rises and falls for certain increases and decreases. Perhaps a more hidden air current now opens the opening and channels of the spring and now closes them (...) Perhaps the intermittence is due to an underground wind or perhaps an alternating flow and reflux in the spring, like a high and low tide in the sea. You can have a meal and eat it next to it, while the water flows with your cup from the very refreshing spring. In the meantime, it disappears and then comes back in a regular time.

A reference to the spring can also be found in the work Naturalis historia by Pliny the Elder, in which it is reported that "In the Como area, near the shores of Lake Lario, there is a copious spring that always grows and falls every hour".

In the Leicester Codex and in Codex Atlanticus, Leonardo described his visit to the spring which took place a few years before the palace was built. Leonardo went to the lake area, on behalf of the Duchy of Milan, in search of iron minerals necessary to produce weapons, agricultural tools and tools (the Duke of Milan, Galeazzo Maria Sforza, was personally interested in the exploitation of iron veins, on which the hopes of development of the Lombard industry rested, along with the mines of Ticino and Lake Como. On 7 July 1472, the Duke ordered the construction of large exploitation works: the mineral was transformed with more modern imported techniques, the low fires and vat ovens were abandoned, in favour of the first blast furnaces of the era by Nicolò Muggiasca).

This is how Leonardo's writings report:

Above Como 8 miles is the Priniana, which increases and decreases every 6 hours; and its growth makes water for 2 mills and advances, its decline causes the springs to dry up

— Leonardo da Vinci, Codex Atlanticus – C.A. 214 recto

As in many places there are veins of water that six hours grow and six fall: and for myself I have seen one in Lake Como, called Fonte Priniana, which makes the aforementioned increase and decrease, so that when it pours, it grinds more mills, and when it is lacking, it falls yes, that it is like looking at the water in a deep well

— Leonardo da Vinci, Codex Leicester – Lei. 11 verso

== History ==
In the Middle Ages the inhabitants of Torno built some mills and plants for the processing of wool on the site. In 1573 the governor of Como, count Giovanni Anguissola, having led in 1547 the conspiracy in which Pier Luigi Farnese, Duke of Parma and Piacenza had died, decided to build a villa-fortress outside the city.

The spring that rises directly on the lake, close to the mountain and dominated by a waterfall about 80 metres high, was then enclosed in the internal courtyard of the building.

Attributed to the architect Giovanni Antonio Piotti, the construction was completed in 1577. The heirs sold it in 1590 to Pirro I Visconti Borromeo, who completed it and terraced the surrounding land to be used for the cultivation of vine and chestnut. In 1676 it was sold again to Francesco Canarisi of Torno, who had frescos in the rooms and added portraits of his ancestors and of the Plinii. A small chapel dedicated to San Francesco was also built. In 1676 the Canarisi family, an important family from Como, became the owner of the Villa, keeping the property until the beginning of the 19th century.

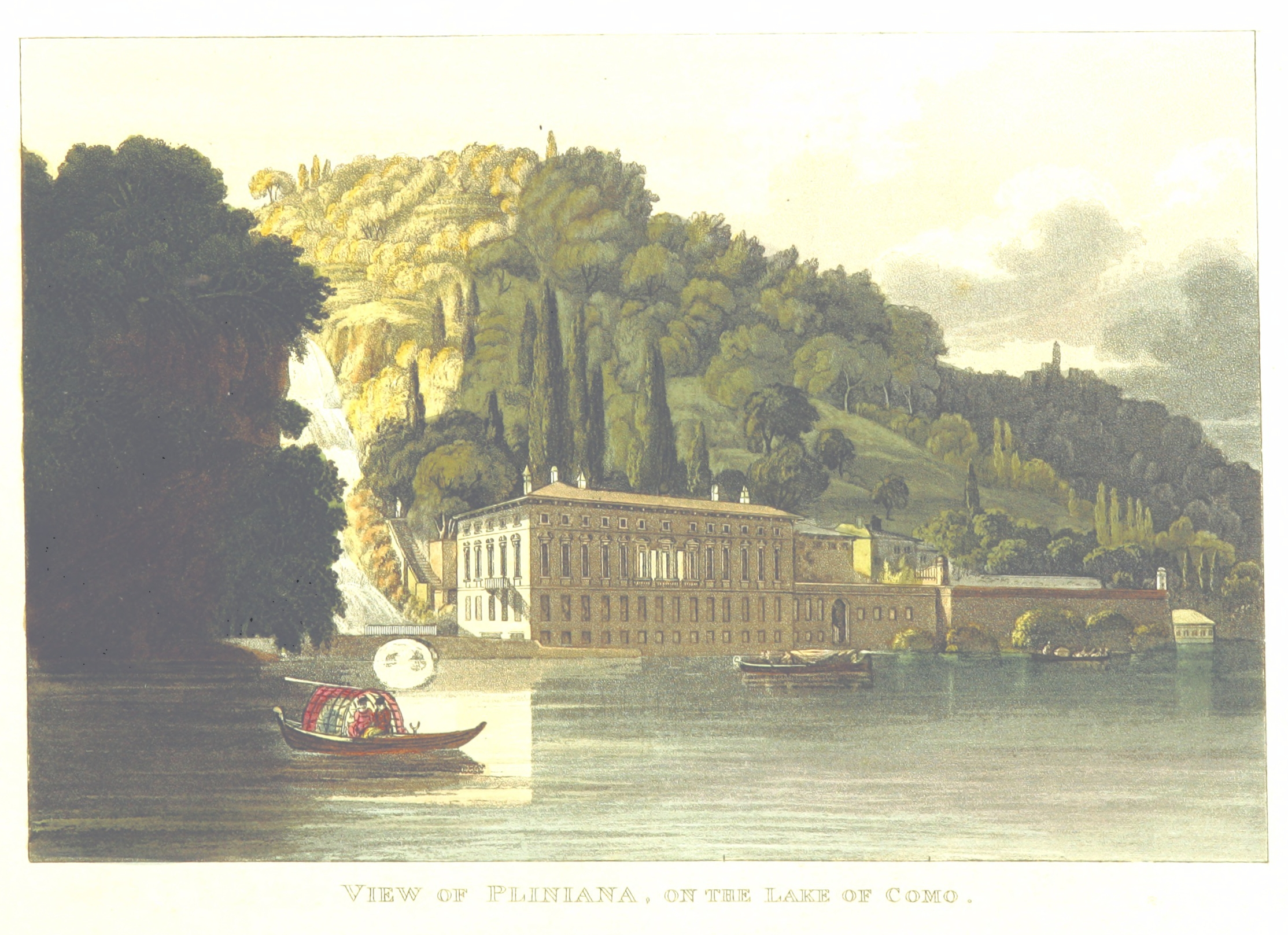
The Villa Pliniana in an illustration from 1820

From the beginning of the 19th century, the Pliniana passed through various owners, until in 1840 it was bought by Prince Emilio Barbiano di Belgiojoso d'Este, who conceived a complete makeover of the decoration. After a daring escape from Paris which caused a scandal at court, between 1843 and 1851 Emilio lived in the villa in the company of his mistress Anne-Marie Berthier, princess of Wagram and wife of the Duke of Plaisance. This is how the arrival of the couple is remembered:

La Pliniana opened her high gate to them and the roar of the waterfall drowned out the countess's exclamations of joy struck by such beauty. In the hall, Anna remained speechless with emotion in front of a small cabinet that Napoleon had given to his guests in 1797 to thank them for the welcome they received. Bonaparte had even thought of buying the villa which seemed to him an ideal resting place. Anna looked tenderly at the piano on which Rossini in three days had composed her Tancredi, and on a wall of the loggia she read the page of Pliny the Younger concerning the intermittent spring.

After Emilio's death, the palace was still used by his wife, the princess Cristina Trivulzio di Belgiojoso, while it was later inherited by his son-in-law, Ludovico Trotti Bentivoglio. In 1890 the villa then passed to Cesare Valperga di Masino, who transferred the furnishings to the Masino castle. At the Pliniana there was also the superb portrait of the Princess, the work of Francesco Hayez The painting, after the Masino castle, is now part of a private collection (and is not accessible to the public).

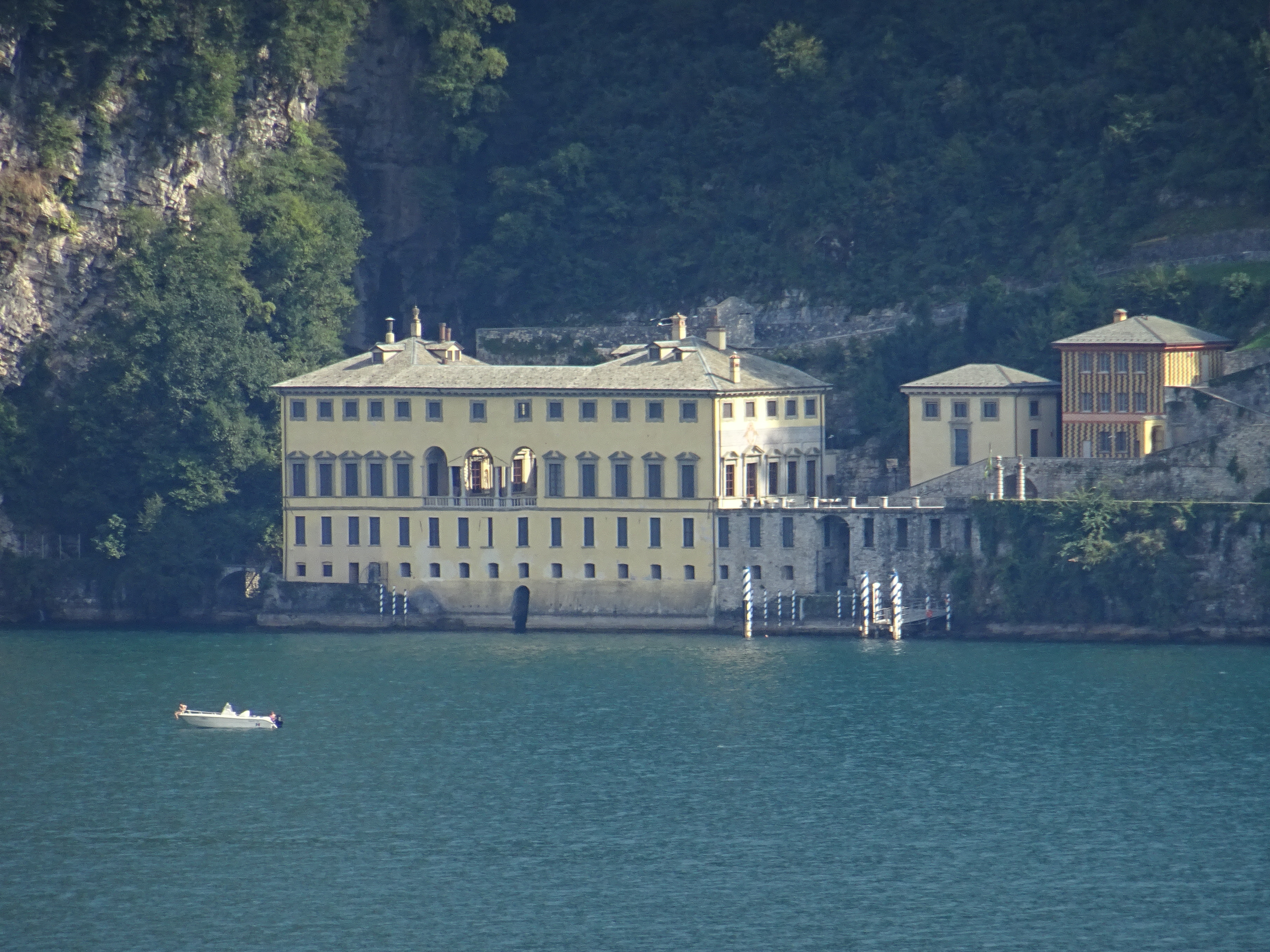
Villa Pliniana after the restoration in 2016

The Pliniana then went through a long period living exclusively on cultural memories linked to the period of European Romanticism and Decadentism, not excluding the legendary aura due to five centuries of history and its difficult geographical position.

The villa hosted numerous personalities including monarchs, scientists, musicians, poets and writers: Napoleon, Joseph II, Francis I and the queen Margherita di Savoia, Alessandro Volta, Lazzaro Spallanzani, Franz Liszt, Gioachino Rossini, Vincenzo Bellini, Giacomo Puccini, Stendhal, Shelley, George Gordon Byron, Ugo Foscolo, Berchet, Alessandro Manzoni and Antonio Fogazzaro, who was inspired by it to write the novel Malombra on which the film Malombra directed by Mario Soldati and shot in the villa in 1942 was based.

After many years of neglect, the Pliniana complex was finally bought in 1983 by Emilio Ottolenghi, from Turin, and his son Guido, members of the Ottolenghi family, owners of Pir, Petrolifera Italo Rumena. They established the Pliniana Real Estate Company, starting a slow historical restoration that lasted about thirty years, and expanding the only access road to the villa.

== Description ==
The main body of the building has a façade overlooking the lake with four rows of windows, on the main floor with broken tympana and on the top floor framed by lesana identical to the windows of Palazzo Gallio.

At the centre of the main floor there is a loggia with three arches supported by coupled columns. On the side facing the mountain, behind a statue of Neptune with a trident, the loggia opens onto a courtyard where the Pliniana spring emerges.

The main floor is connected to the upper floor by a large helical staircase in sandstone covered in wood, covered by a vault painted with a starry sky. The upper floor houses bedrooms and services added in recent times.

Below the main floor there is a first lower floor, consisting of service rooms including a large kitchen, pantry and rooms for servants. Lower still, now at the level of the lake, a second lower floor consists of a long corridor illuminated by square openings without closure, which leads to various vaulted cellars. Below an opening allows the water of the Fonte Pliniana to flow into the lake.

The interiors have rooms with floors decorated with mosaic coats of arms. Under the coffered ceilings, there are some painted bands.

== Legends and curiosities ==
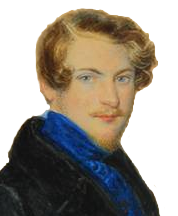
Emilio Barbiano di Belgiojoso

Due to its isolation and its severe appearance, the villa is still known today for being the abode of ghosts, also because the first owner Giovanni Anguissola died in turn murdered after killing the Duke of Parma. The same novel Malombra, of clear taste decadent, reveals Fogazzaro's interest in occult matters.

The most famous episode, which came to be tinged with legend, is however linked to the love story between Emilio Barbiano di Belgiojoso, the prince who had married Cristina Trivulzio, and Princess Anne-Marie Berthier (daughter of Marshal Berthier, prince of Wagram and chief of staff of Napoleon, and the Duchess of Birkenfeld), who lived eight years of almost total isolation at Pliniana. Anne-Marie, who lived in Paris with her husband, created Duke of Plaisance by Bonaparte, suddenly fled from the French capital together with Belgiojoso, abandoning, in addition to her spouse, a newborn child, and causing a great scandal. Thus, between the end of the Thirties and the early Forties, they devoted themselves solely to pleasure, in a villa with "rooms full of shade, which look like silent burial chambers of a castle of vanished sovereigns", immersed in a landscape of «sepulchral, tall cypress trees», on «a steep cliff between immense memories of ambushes and blood». It is said of them:

In the evening, on the toll of midnight, they used to wrap themselves naked together in a sheet to dive from the top of the loggia into the lake, as if to seek relief from the fever of love that united them. The villagers on the opposite bank thought they saw a ghost and were frightened. The daily repetition of the fact confirmed their belief. There was a rumor that, every day at midnight precisely, a ghost – perhaps that of Anguissola or that of the governor's victim, the Duke of Piacenza – swooped headlong into the lake.

The woman did not care about the scandal caused, and rejected the attempts to have her return to France, while the prince, linked to the circles of the Risorgimento conspiracy, declined the invitation to return to take care of the homeland. One day, finally, Anne-Marie abandoned him while he was sleeping, to move to Milan, where he will buy a stage at the La Scala, resuming the social life that had already characterized the years preceding the escape with Belgiojoso. The latter, for his part, remained a recluse in the villa for some years, until, ill with syphilis, he decided to spend the last years in his Milanese palace.
