= Torno, Lombardy =

Torno Turnu (Lombard)
- Comune
- Comune di Torno
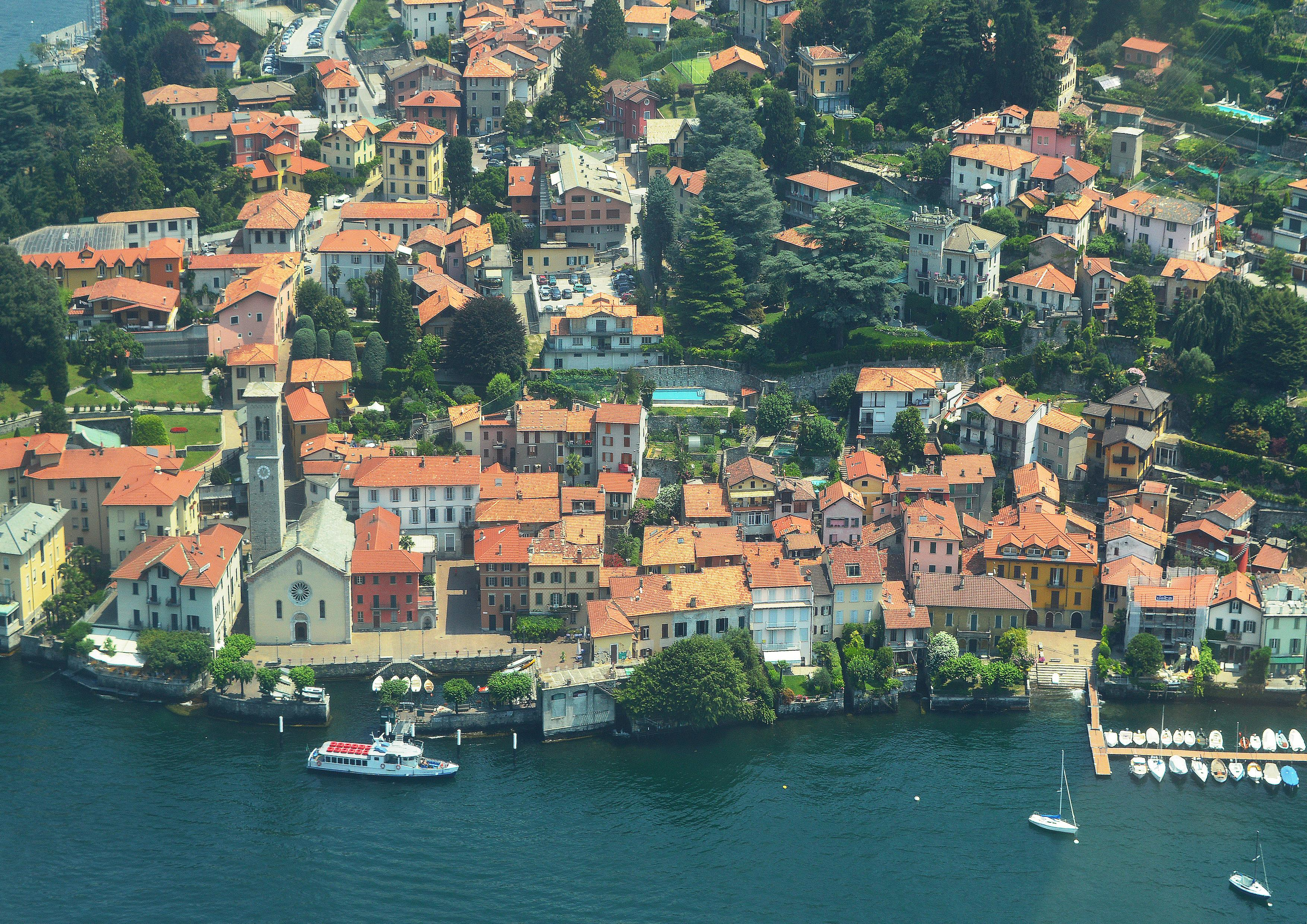
- Panoramic view of Torno

- Location of Torno in the province of Como
- Coordinates: 45°51′N 9°07′E
- Country: Italy
- Region: Lombardy
- Province: Como (CO)

Government
  - Mayor: Rino Malacrida (Ind.)

Area
  - Total: 7.79 km^{2} (3.01 sq mi)
- Elevation: 225 m (738 ft)

Population (2023)
  - Total: 1,085
  - Density: 139/km^{2} (361/sq mi)
- Time zone: UTC+1
  - Summer (DST): UTC+2 (CEST)
- Postal code: 22020
- Dialing code: 031
- Website: Official website

Torno (Comasco: Turnu [ˈtuːrnu]) is a comune (municipality) in the Province of Como in the Italian region Lombardy, located on the shores of Lake Como.

== Geography ==
The town is situated on a rocky promontory along the eastern shore of the southwestern branch of Lake Como.

== Etymology ==
According to one hypothesis, the name Torno derives from the Celtic word Turn, meaning "bend" or "turn", referring either to the curve of the lake around the promontory or to the rounded profile of the hill overlooking the settlement.

Alternative theories suggest an Etruscan origin linked to the god Turms (the equivalent of Mercury), or a connection to the Latin verb tornāre ("to turn on a lathe").

== History ==
The area was inhabited in pre-Roman times, with the layout of the current settlement dating back to the late Roman Empire. During the Roman period, the writers Pliny the Elder and Pliny the Younger described an intermittent spring located in the area of Villa Pliniana.

Between the 13th and 16th centuries, under the influence of the Humiliati religious order, Torno developed into an important center for the textile industry and wool production in the Lake Como region. Its economic independence and growing population led to a fierce rivalry with the nearby city of Como. During the Italian Wars, Torno allied with France, while Como sided with the House of Sforza and the Spanish Empire.

In 1515, Torno was sacked by Sforza troops and Swiss mercenaries. On 11 June 1522, troops from Como and Spain almost completely destroyed the town. This destruction marked the end of Torno's dominance in the wool trade and initiated a prolonged period of economic and demographic decline, driving significant emigration to France and Germany in subsequent centuries.

In 1920, the first local chapter of the Associazione Nazionale Alpini (National Alpini Association) was founded in Torno.

== Main sights ==
=== Religious architecture ===
- Church of Santa Tecla: Located near the harbor, this parish church has Romanesque origins and features a Gothic rose window and a carved marble portal dating to 1480.
- Church of San Giovanni Battista del Chiodo: Built in the 14th century, it houses a relic believed to be a Holy Nail from the True Cross, brought to Torno in 1099 following a Crusade. It features a Renaissance portal attributed to the workshop of Tommaso Rodari.
- Church of Santa Elisabetta: Located in the hamlet of Montepiatto at an altitude of approximately 600 metres (2,000 ft), this 16th-century church was formerly part of a cloistered nunnery.

=== Natural sites and archaeology ===
- Massi Avelli: Monolithic tombs carved directly into erratic granite boulders, dating back to late antiquity and the early Middle Ages.
- Pietra Pendula: A prominent glacial erratic boulder balanced precariously atop a smaller limestone rock near Montepiatto, designated as a natural monument of Lombardy.

=== Civil architecture ===
- Villa Pliniana: A 16th-century historical villa built at the base of a cliff over Lake Como, famous for its intermittent spring and notable visitors including Leonardo da Vinci, Lord Byron, and Percy Bysshe Shelley.
- Villa Tanzi Taverna and Villa Plinianina, which are historical villas located along the shoreline that showcase the region's traditional aristocratic architecture.

== Bibliography ==
- Bartolini, Franco (2016). I segreti del Lago di Como e del suo territorio (in Italian). Cermenate: New Press Edizioni.
- Berra, Pietro (2023). Da Plinio a Volta - Itinerari d'autore sul lago di Como (in Italian). Lomazzo: New Press Edizioni. ISBN 978-88-93562-05-8.
- Borghese, Annalisa (1992). Il territorio lariano e i suoi comuni (in Italian). Milan: Editoriale del Drago.
- Muller, Pietro (2002). L'insigne Borgata (in Italian). Como: Editoriale Lombarda.
- Suffia, Giusi, ed. (2019). Como, i laghi e le valli (in Italian). Turin: Europea Editoriale C.O.M. s.r.l.
- Tajana, Clemente (2024). Passeggiate comasche 2 (in Italian). Lomazzo: New Press Edizioni. ISBN 978-88-93562-43-0.
