= Centro Valle Intelvi =

- Comune
- Comune di Centro Valle Intelvi
- Location within Italy Location within Lombardy
- Coordinates: 45°58′N 9°05′E
- Country: Italy
- Region: Lombardy
- Province: Como (CO)
- Frazioni: Casasco d'Intelvi, Castiglione d'Intelvi, San Fedele Intelvi

Government
  - Mayor: Michele Giacomino

Area
  - Total: 19.66 km^{2} (7.59 sq mi)
- Elevation: 799 m (2,621 ft)

Population (31 May 2023)
  - Total: 3,699
  - Density: 188.1/km^{2} (487.3/sq mi)
- Time zone: UTC+1 (CET)
  - Summer (DST): UTC+2 (CEST)
- Postal code: 22022, 22023 and 22028
- Dialing code: 031

Centro Valle Intelvi is a comune (municipality) in the Province of Como in the Italian region Lombardy. It was created on 1 January 2018 after the merger of the former comuni of Casasco d'Intelvi, Castiglione d'Intelvi and San Fedele Intelvi.
