= Comasco dialect =

Western Lombard dialect of Como, Italy

Comasco
- comasch
- Pronunciation: [kuˈmaʃk]
- Native to: Italy
- Native speakers: (undated figure of 30,000)
- Language family: Indo-European: Italic; Latino-Faliscan; Romance; Italo-Western; Western Romance; Gallo-Romance; Gallo-Italic; Lombard–Piedmontese?; Lombard; Western Lombard; Comasco–Lecchese; Comasco

Language codes
- ISO 639-3: –
- Glottolog: None

Comasco (endonym: comasch), anglicized as Comasque, is a dialect belonging to the Western branch of Lombard language, spoken in the city and suburbs of Como. Comasco is part of the Comasco-Lecchese dialect group.

== History ==
The Comasco dialect evolved as a consequence of its origins and influences. In ancient times, the Lake Como area was inhabited by Orobi, Leponzi, and Etruscan tribes. As with the rest of the Po Valley, the area was subject to invasions by the Gauls. In Roman times, the Latin spoken in the Lake Como area was influenced by the Celtic substratum, contributing to the phonetic and lexical formation of today's dialect. In the early Middle Ages, the area was occupied by the Lombards, who probably spoke a dialect of the Saxon language and brought a further, albeit small, lexical contribution. In the late Middle Ages, the Lake Como territory became part of the Duchy of Milan.

== Characteristics ==
It shares similarities with Milanese, but more precisely consists of a transition between Brianzöö and Ticinese, in fact both the masculine singular article ul (typical of central Brianzöö) and el (typical of Milanese and Ticinese) are used. Generally, it has harder sounds than other dialects.
