= Villa Bernasconi =

Residence in Cernobbio, Como, Italy

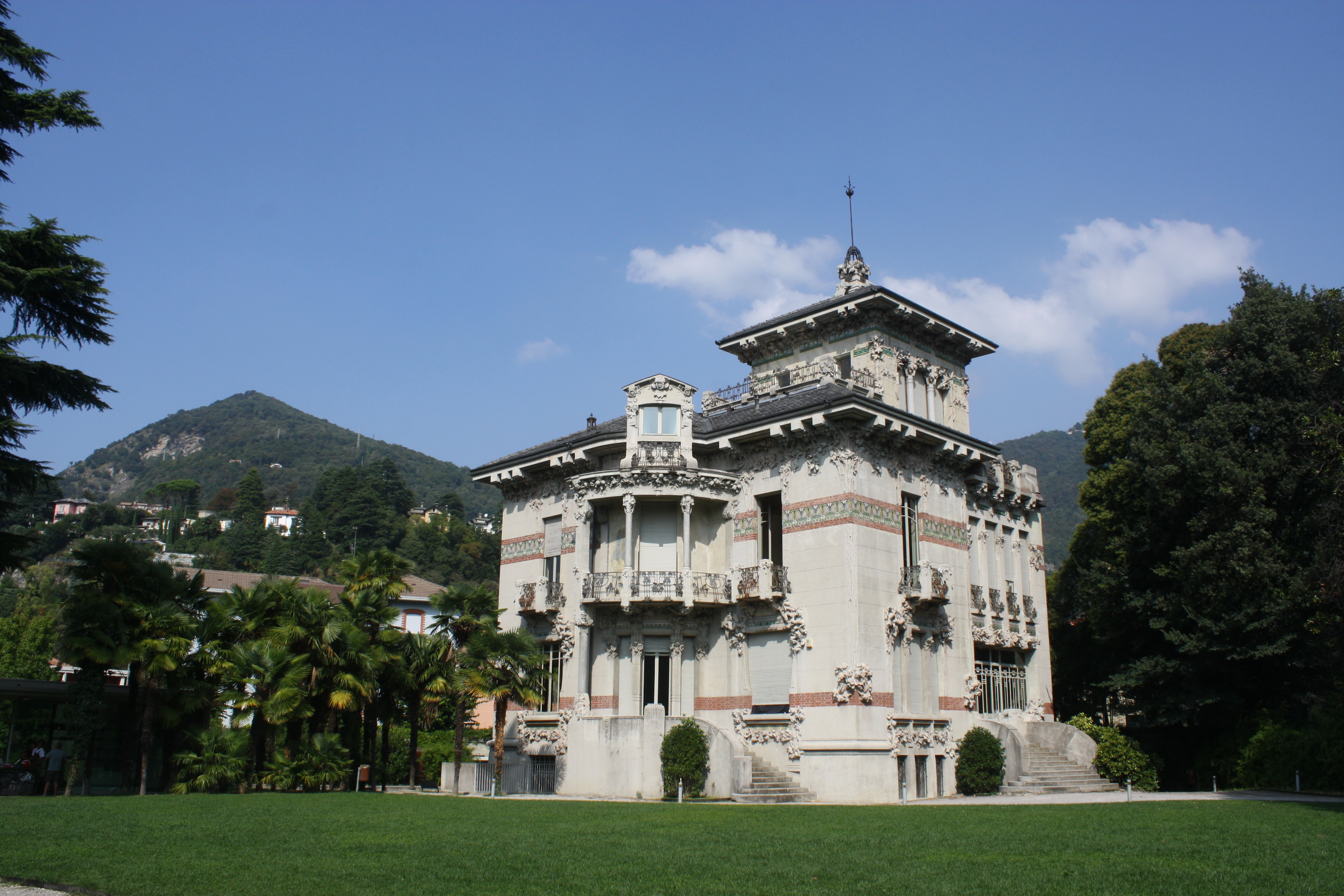

- Location within Italy

General information
- Status: Museum
- Architectural style: Art Nouveau
- Location: Cernobbio, Italy
- Coordinates: 45°50′15″N 09°04′23″E
- Completed: 1906

Design and construction
- Architect: Alfredo Campanini

Website
- www.villabernasconi.eu

Villa Bernasconi is a typical example of an independent villa with a turret in the Art Nouveau style. Located in Cernobbio, it was commissioned by the textile manufacturer Davide Bernasconi to the Milanese architect Alfredo Campanini.

== History ==
Bernasconi founded his factory, later known as Tessiture Bernasconi (Bernasconi Textile Mills) in 1876. It started out as a small textile mill with only 40 looms. In 1906, it had grown to 560 looms and new plants had been opened or acquired in the towns of Cantello, Solbiate, Maccio, Giussano, Cagno, Figliaro. The enlargement of the Cernobbio factory took up a vast area at the center of the town, turning it into a typical model village. Beside the mill, it included housing for workmen and clerks, the owner's residence and a kindergarten. Bernasconi decided to leave his old mansion (close to the factory and currently hosting the municipal offices) to his son and to build himself a new one. The villa would stand as a symbol of his commercial success and embody the taste in fashion, the affluence and the optimistic outlook of the era. It was built close to the town center, on a lot adjoining the family's silk mills, and completed in 1906. In the same years, Milan was busy preparing the Universal Exhibition which would celebrate the opening of the Simplon Tunnel. The Villa belonged to the heirs of the Bernasconi family until 1955. After that, it was sold to a local transport company, which in turn rented it to the local Guardia di Finanza. In 1989, it was bought by the Town of Cernobbio, which funded several restoration interventions, starting in 1995.

The villa hosts the first permanent talking museum devoted to Art Nouveau and to the Bernasconi family, inaugurated in 2017.

== Description ==
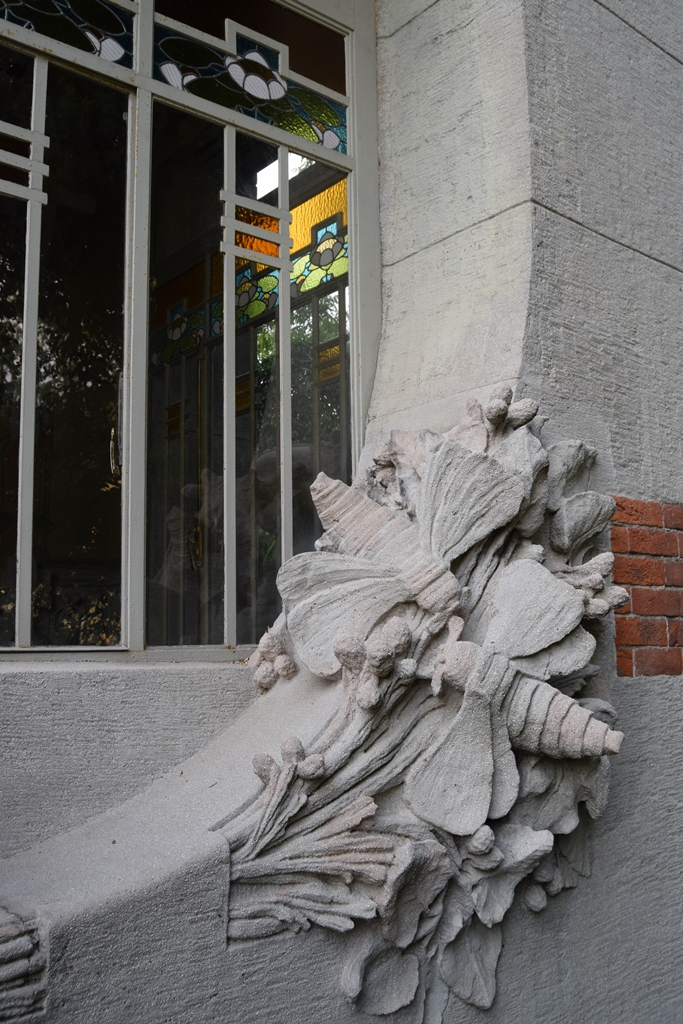
Bombyx mori butterfly in ornamental concrete

Villa Bernasconi is a two-storey, open-space villa with a basement floor and a turret. The building has two entrances. The main entrance, on the east façade, has steps leading to a veranda with a metal framework and multicolour decorations. The veranda opens on the central, square hall and the main stairway. The second entrance, on the south façade, leads to a curved loggia/ balcony which in turn opens on the reception room. The main compositional element is the central stairwell, which rises beyond the upper floor and turns into a panoramic turret.

=== Exterior decoration ===
Campanini himself designed every single decorative element down to the smallest detail, with a harmonious integration of materials and shapes. He also coordinated the work of highly skilled craftsmen. The façade is embellished by hammered and carved concrete plaster decorations, imitating large blocks. Every architectural element is adorned with larger than life sculpted depictions of a silkworm's life cycle – silkworms, mulberry leaves, flowers and berries, and butterflies.

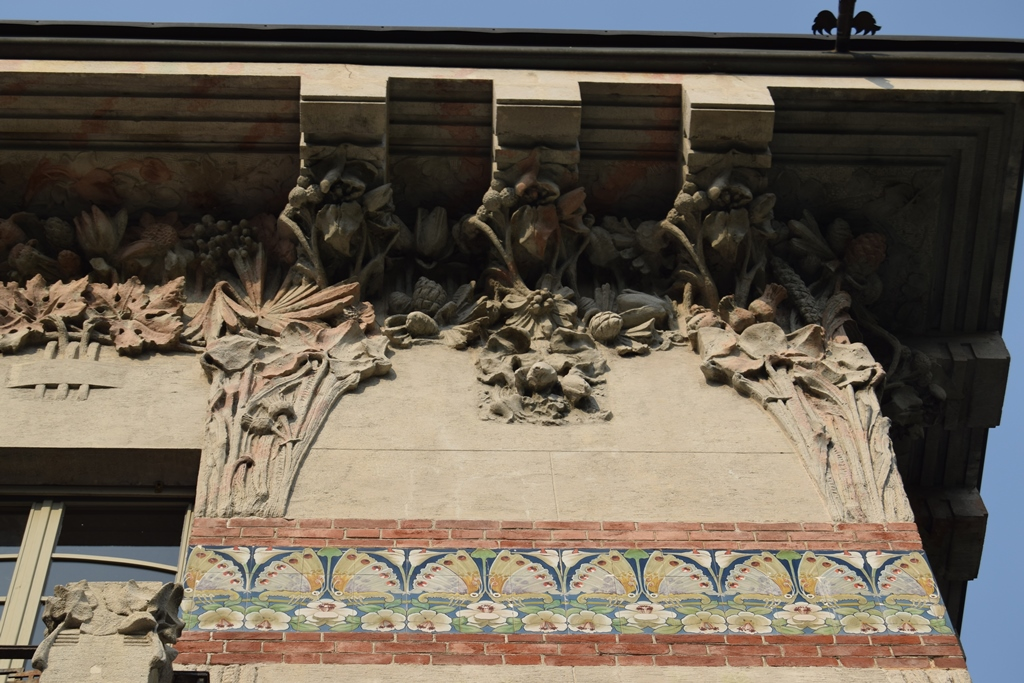
Multicolour tile frieze with butterflies

The building is also ornamented with several different ceramic tile friezes, depicting flowers and stylized vegetable elements in strongly contrasting colours. The higher frieze represents silkworm butterflies, while under the eaves we can find single tile inserts with white petals (possibly magnolias’) on a blue background. Lower down, we have smaller bands of ceramic tiles with a leaf motif. On top of the windows, we find other blue tile inserts with lily-shaped white flowers with pointed petals.

The wrought iron elements are probably the result of a collaboration between Campanini and Alessandro Mazzucotelli. This hypothesis is corroborated by some preliminary sketches for the architect's own home, found in Mazzucotelli's archive, by the high quality of the Villa's decorative elements, and by their affinities with contemporary works by the artist. Villa Bernasconi has many wrought iron fixtures (the fence, the banisters, the balcony railings, some window frames) in a plethora of different motifs: wide, fleshy leaves, Secession-style graphic elements for the backstairs banisters, roses and tendrils for the main staircase.

=== Interiors ===
Like the exterior, the interior is in the Art Nouveau style. The main stairwell is dominated by a three section stained glass wall that lets light and colour in. The figurative portion of the design is made up of small coloured glass panels held together by a metal framework.

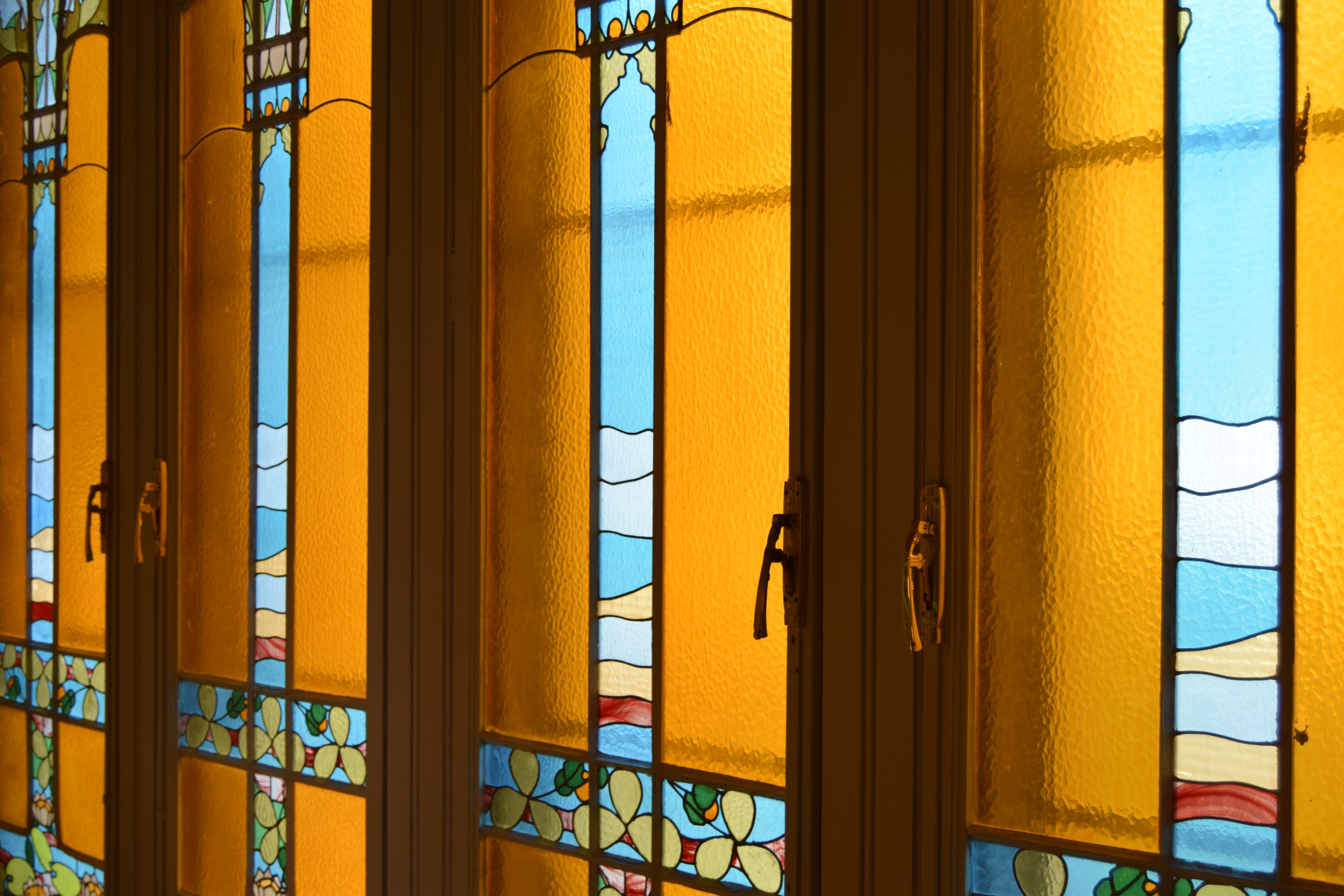
Stained glass wall

The walls are decorated with painted naturalistic motifs. The wooden fixtures, the accurately shaped doors and windows, the exquisite design of the handles (which is different in the public rooms and the servants’ quarters) all express a strong coherence in both design and execution, with a harmonious fusion of structure and ornament.

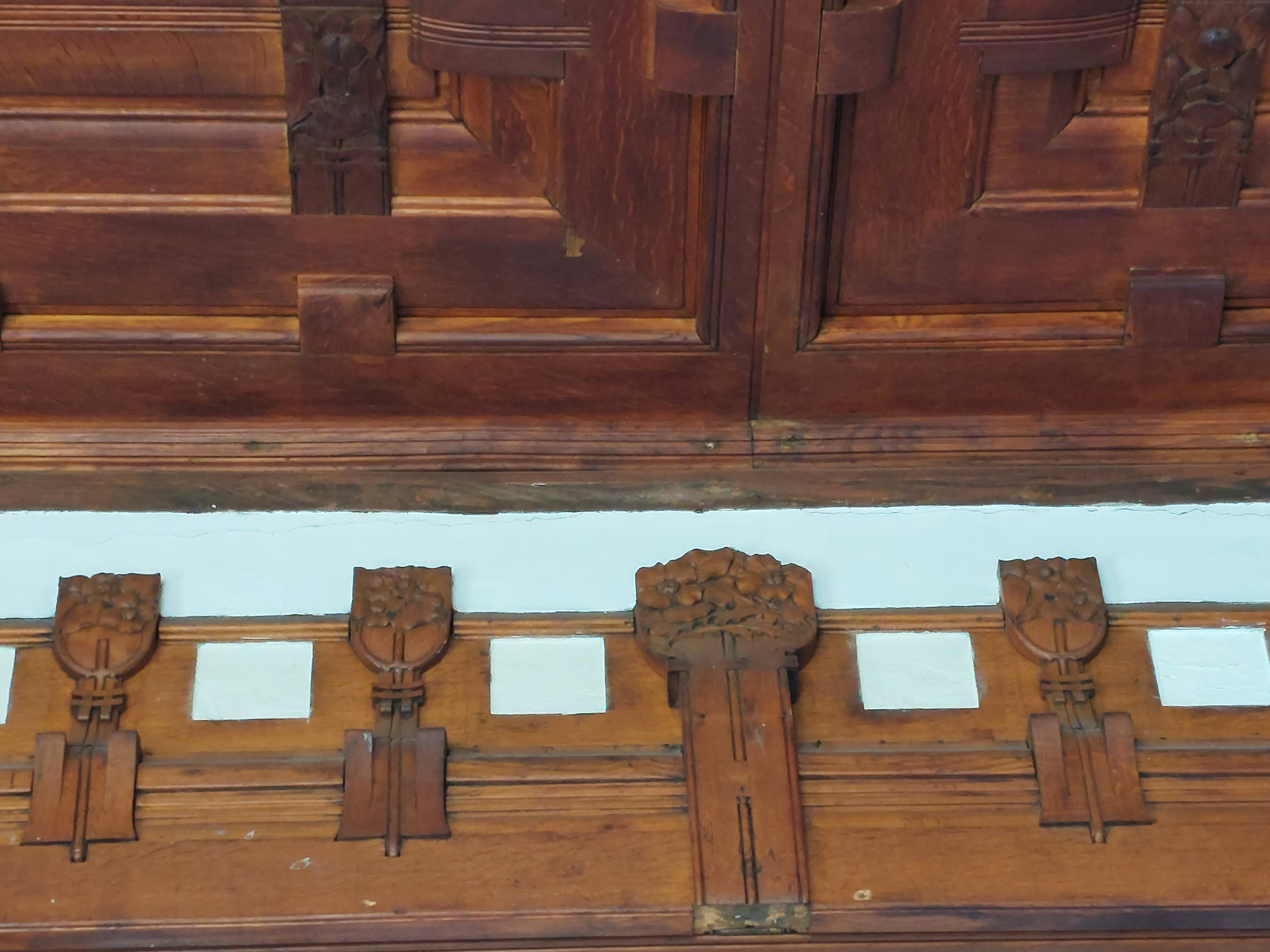
Villa Bernasconi wooden ceiling

Unfortunately, nothing is left of the original furniture, save for a marble column with a potted palm, now standing in the veranda of the main entrance.

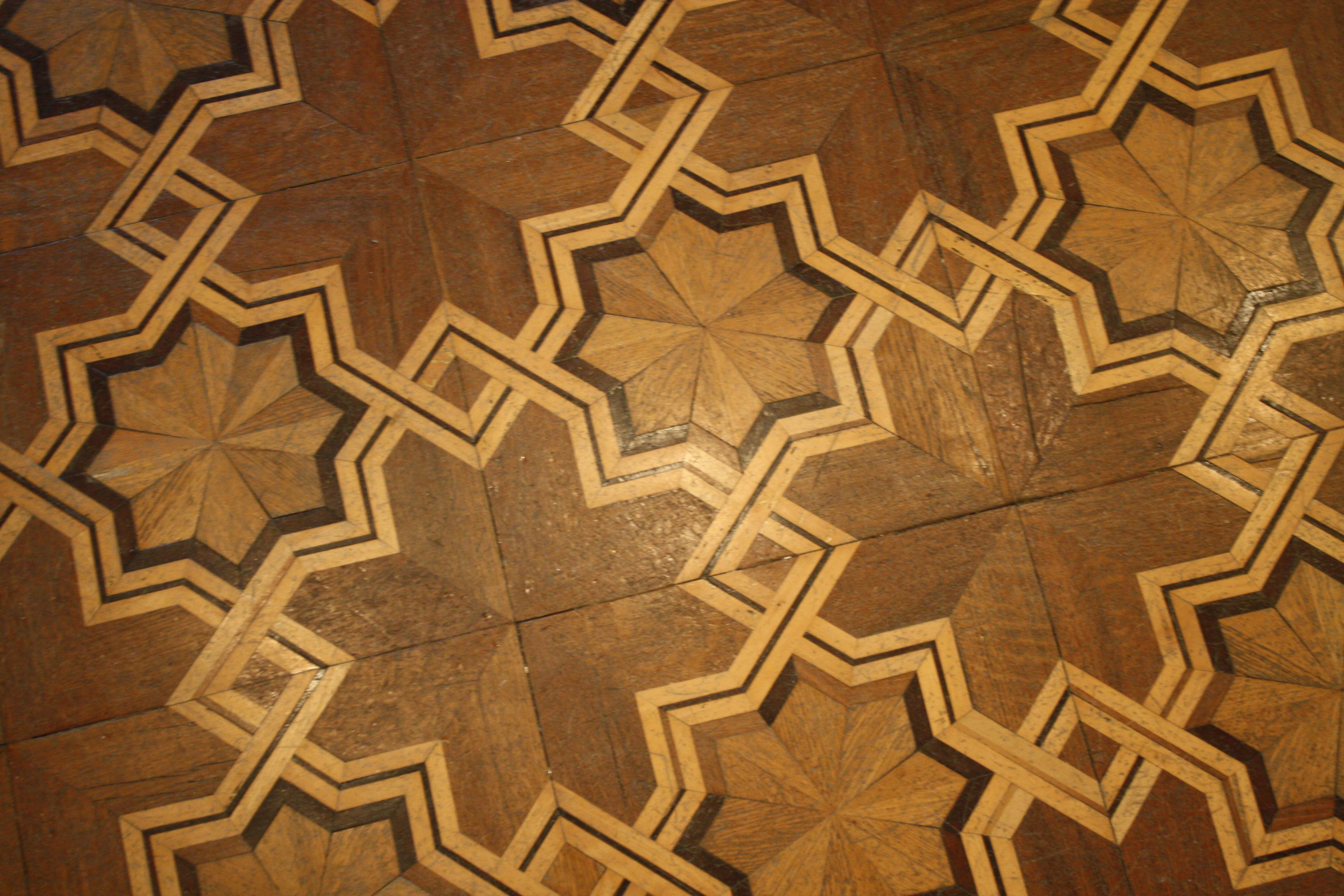
Wooden floor intarsia

== See also ==
- Villa del Balbianello
- Villa Carlotta
- Villa Erba
- Villa d'Este, Cernobbio
- Villa Melzi
- Villa Monastero
- Villa Olmo
- Villa Serbelloni
- Villa Vigoni

== Bibliography ==
- Belloni, Luigi Mario; Besana, Renato (1991). Alberto Longatti (ed.). Castelli basiliche e ville – Tesori architettonici lariani nel tempo. Como – Lecco: La Provincia S.p.A. Editoriale.
- Stefano Della Torre, ed. (2008). Cernobbio. Villa Bernasconi. Storia e restauro. Como: NodoLibri. ISBN 9788871851440.
- Trabella, Francesca (2020). 50 Ville del Lago di Como. Lipomo: Dominioni Editore. ISBN 978-88-87867-38-1.
