= Venegono =

Venegono may refer to the following places in the Province of Varese, Italy:

- Venegono Inferiore
- Venegono Superiore
