= Solbiate con Cagno =

- Comune
- Comune di Solbiate con Cagno
- Location within Italy Location within Lombardy
- Coordinates: 45°47′N 8°56′E
- Country: Italy
- Region: Lombardy
- Province: Como (CO)
- Frazioni: Solbiate Cagno Concagno

Government
  - Mayor: Federico Broggi

Area
  - Total: 7.62 km^{2} (2.94 sq mi)
- Elevation: 445 m (1,460 ft)

Population (30/11/2020)
  - Total: 4,681
  - Density: 614/km^{2} (1,590/sq mi)
- Time zone: UTC+1 (CET)
  - Summer (DST): UTC+2 (CEST)
- Postal code: 22043
- Dialing code: 031
- ISTAT code: 013255
- Website: https://www.comune.solbiateconcagno.co.it/

Solbiate con Cagno (Sulbiaa e Càgn in Comasco) is a comune (municipality) in the Province of Como in the Italian region Lombardy.

It was established on 1 January 2019 by the merging of the municipalities of Solbiate and Cagno.

It consists of 3 fractions: Solbiate, Cagno and Concagno.

== History ==
The merging proposal was approved by a popular referendum on 10 June 2018.

=== Roman Age ===
There are evidences that the area of Solbiate con Cagno was already inhabited during the Roman Era.

In Cagno a Roman tomb was excavated in 1976 and it was moved to the current graveyard, where it is shown today.

=== Middle Age ===
The name "Solbiate" appears in various documents of the 11th and 12th centuries, where a loco et fundo Solbiate and a Solbiate iusta Binnacum are cited.

Originally part of the Contado del Seprio, it became part of the Ducato di Milano from the XIV century until the beginning of the 19th century.

Solbiate is also cited in the documents Statuti di Como of 1335, when the maintenance of a part of the main road was assigned to the village.

Cagno was already a village during the Langobards period, during which the churches of San Giorgio and San Michele were built. Important for the period is also the chapel of San Rocco, built during the 15th century.

During the 15th century, Cagno was part of the Odescalchi family estate. Later, Cagno was also part of the Ducato di Milano.
