= Appiano =

Appiano may refer to:

- Appiano Gentile, a municipality in the province of Como, Italy
- Appiano sulla strada del vino, Italian name for Eppan an der Weinstraße, a municipality in South Tyrol, Italy
- Appiano (family), noble family that governed the principality of Piombino from the 14th to 18th centuries

== See also ==
- Appian, Ancient Roman philosopher
