= Cantello (disambiguation) =

Cantello is an Italian commune.

Cantello may also refer to:

- Mount Cantello, mountain in Victoria Land, Antarctica

== People with the surname ==
- Al Cantello (b. 1933), American javelin thrower and track coach
- Len Cantello (b. 1951), English footballer
