= Oltrona di San Mamette =

- Comune
- Comune di Oltrona di San Mamette
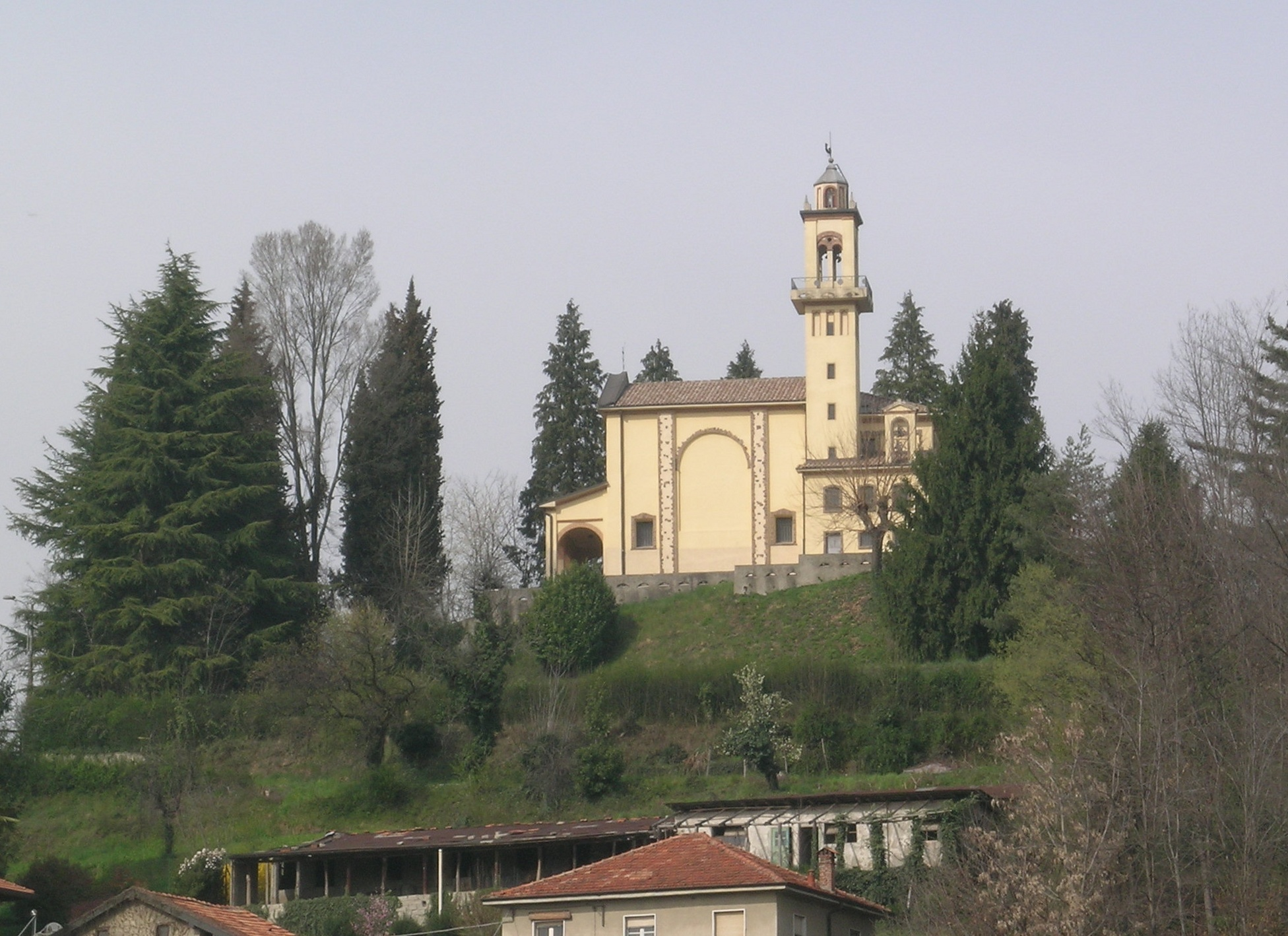
- View of the Sanctuary

- Coat of arms

- Location within Italy Location within Lombardy
- Coordinates: 45°45′N 8°58′E
- Country: Italy
- Region: Lombardy
- Province: Province of Como (CO)
- Frazioni: Cerc, Gerbo

Area
  - Total: 2.7 km^{2} (1.0 sq mi)
- Elevation: 370 m (1,210 ft)

Population (Dec. 2004)
  - Total: 2,190
  - Density: 810/km^{2} (2,100/sq mi)
- Demonym: Oltronesi
- Time zone: UTC+1 (CET)
  - Summer (DST): UTC+2 (CEST)
- Postal code: 22070
- Dialing code: 031

Oltrona di San Mamette (Comasco: Ultróna [ulˈtroːna]) is a comune (municipality) in the Province of Como in the Italian region Lombardy, located about 35 kilometres (22 mi) northwest of Milan and about 12 kilometres (7 mi) southwest of Como. As of 31 December 2004, it had a population of 2,190 and an area of 2.7 km^{2} (1.0 sq mi).

The municipality of Oltrona di San Mamette contains the frazioni (subdivisions, mainly villages and hamlets) Cerc and Gerbo.

Oltrona di San Mamette borders the following municipalities: Appiano Gentile, Beregazzo con Figliaro, Lurate Caccivio, Olgiate Comasco.

== Demographic evolution ==
Historical population

Year	Pop.	±%
1861	440	—
1871	505	+14.8%
1881	680	+34.7%
1901	831	+22.2%
1911	813	−2.2%

Year	Pop.	±%
1921	818	+0.6%
1931	959	+17.2%
1936	966	+0.7%
1951	1,059	+9.6%
1961	1,256	+18.6%

Year	Pop.	±%
1971	1,450	+15.4%
1981	1,626	+12.1%
1991	1,936	+19.1%
2001	2,097	+8.3%

Source: Data from ISTAT
