= Olgiate Comasco =

Olgiate Comasco Olgiaa (Lombard)
- Comune
- Città di Olgiate Comasco
- Coat of arms

- Location within Italy Location within Lombardy
- Coordinates: 45°47′N 8°58′E
- Country: Italy
- Region: Lombardy
- Province: Como (CO)
- Frazioni: Baragiola, Somaino, Rongio, Casletto, Cantalupo, Boscone, Gerbo

Government
  - Mayor: Simone Moretti

Area
  - Total: 10.96 km^{2} (4.23 sq mi)
- Elevation: 400 m (1,300 ft)

Population (30 November 2017)
  - Total: 11,651
  - Density: 1,063/km^{2} (2,753/sq mi)
- Demonym: Olgiatesi
- Time zone: UTC+1 (CET)
  - Summer (DST): UTC+2 (CEST)
- Postal code: 22077
- Dialing code: 031
- Website: Official website

Olgiate Comasco (Comasco: Olgiaa [ulˈdʒaː]) is a comune (municipality) in the Province of Como in the Italian region Lombardy, located about 40 kilometres (25 mi) northwest of Milan and about 10 kilometres (6 mi) southwest of Como. It received the honorary title of city with a presidential decree in 1998.

Olgiate borders the following municipalities: Albiolo, Beregazzo con Figliaro, Colverde, Faloppio, Lurate Caccivio, Oltrona di San Mamette, Solbiate, Somaino

== Main sights ==
There are three churches in Olgiate Comasco,

- St. Ippolito e Cassiano, sited in the downtown
- St. Gerardo
- Annunziata, in the frazione Somaino.

== Twin towns ==
- Liancourt, France
- Pesterzsébet, Budapest, Hungary
- San Cataldo, Italy
