= Faloppio =

Faloppio Falòpp (Lombard)
- Comune
- Comune di Faloppio
- Coat of arms

- Location within Italy Location within Lombardy
- Coordinates: 45°49′N 8°58′E
- Country: Italy
- Region: Lombardy
- Province: Como (CO)

Government
  - Mayor: Giuseppe Prestinari

Area
  - Total: 4.14 km^{2} (1.60 sq mi)
- Elevation: 376 m (1,234 ft)

Population (31 March 2017)
  - Total: 4,772
  - Density: 1,150/km^{2} (2,990/sq mi)
- Demonym: Faloppiesi
- Time zone: UTC+1 (CET)
  - Summer (DST): UTC+2 (CEST)
- Postal code: 22020
- Dialing code: 031
- Website: Official website

Faloppio (Comasco: Falòpp [faˈlɔp]) is a comune (municipality) in the Province of Como in the Italian region of Lombardy, located about 40 kilometres (25 mi) northwest of Milan and about 9 kilometres (6 mi) west of Como.

Faloppio borders the following municipalities: Albiolo, Colverde, Olgiate Comasco, Uggiate-Trevano.
