= Beregazzo con Figliaro =

Beregazzo con Figliaro Beregazz con Fiee (Lombard)
- Comune
- Comune di Beregazzo con Figliaro
- Location within Italy Location within Lombardy
- Coordinates: 45°46′53″N 8°56′37″E
- Country: Italy
- Region: Lombardy
- Province: Province of Como (CO)

Area
  - Total: 3.8 km^{2} (1.5 sq mi)

Population (Dec. 2004)
  - Total: 2,387
  - Density: 630/km^{2} (1,600/sq mi)
- Time zone: UTC+1 (CET)
  - Summer (DST): UTC+2 (CEST)
- Postal code: 22070
- Dialing code: 031

Beregazzo con Figliaro (Comasco: Beregazz con Fiee [bereˈɡats kũ fiˈ(j)eː]) is a comune (municipality) within the Province of Como, Lombardy, Italy. The municipality is located about 35 kilometres (22 mi) northwest of Milan and about 11 kilometres (7 mi) southwest of Como. As of 31 December 2004, it had a population of 2,387 and an area of 3.8 square kilometres (1.5 mi^{2}).

Beregazzo con Figliaro borders the following municipalities: Appiano Gentile, Binago, Castelnuovo Bozzente, Lurate Caccivio, Olgiate Comasco, Oltrona di San Mamette, Solbiate.

== Demographic evolution ==
Historical population

Year	Pop.	±%
1861	616	—
1871	699	+13.5%
1881	741	+6.0%
1901	729	−1.6%
1911	754	+3.4%

Year	Pop.	±%
1921	845	+12.1%
1931	1,189	+40.7%
1936	1,115	−6.2%
1951	1,259	+12.9%
1961	1,465	+16.4%

Year	Pop.	±%
1971	1,606	+9.6%
1981	2,081	+29.6%
1991	2,221	+6.7%
2001	2,310	+4.0%

Source: Data from ISTAT
