= Albiolo =

Albiolo Albiöö (Lombard)
- Comune
- Comune di Albiolo

- Location within Italy Location within Lombardy
- Coordinates: 45°48′N 8°56′E
- Country: Italy
- Region: Lombardy
- Province: Como (CO)

Government
  - Mayor: Rodolfo Civelli

Area
  - Total: 2.84 km^{2} (1.10 sq mi)
- Elevation: 423 m (1,388 ft)

Population (31 March 2017)
  - Total: 2,741
  - Density: 965/km^{2} (2,500/sq mi)
- Demonym: Albiolesi
- Time zone: UTC+1 (CET)
  - Summer (DST): UTC+2 (CEST)
- Postal code: 22070
- Dialing code: 031
- Website: Official website

Albiolo (Comasco: Albiöö) is a comune (municipality) in the Province of Como in the Italian region Lombardy, located about 40 kilometres (25 mi) northwest of Milan and about 12 kilometres (7 mi) west of Como.

Albiolo borders the following municipalities: Cagno, Faloppio, Olgiate Comasco, Solbiate, Uggiate-Trevano, Valmorea.
