= Binago =

Binago Binagh (Lombard)
- Comune
- Comune di Binago
- Location within Italy Location within Lombardy
- Coordinates: 45°47′N 8°55′E
- Country: Italy
- Region: Lombardy
- Province: Province of Como (CO)

Area
  - Total: 6.9 km^{2} (2.7 sq mi)

Population (December 2004)
  - Total: 4,429
  - Density: 640/km^{2} (1,700/sq mi)
- Time zone: UTC+1 (CET)
  - Summer (DST): UTC+2 (CEST)
- Postal code: 22070
- Dialing code: 031
- Website: Official website

Binago (Comasco: Binagh [biˈnaːk]) is a comune (municipality) in the Province of Como in the Italian region Lombardy, located about 40 kilometres (25 mi) northwest of Milan and about 13 kilometres (8 mi) southwest of Como. As of 31 December 2004, it had a population of 4,429 and an area of 6.9 square kilometres (2.7 mi^{2}).

Binago borders the following municipalities: Beregazzo con Figliaro, Castelnuovo Bozzente, Malnate, Solbiate, Vedano Olona, Venegono Inferiore, Venegono Superiore.

== Demographic evolution ==
Historical population

Year	Pop.	±%
1861	1,900	—
1871	2,066	+8.7%
1881	2,234	+8.1%
1901	2,192	−1.9%
1911	2,510	+14.5%

Year	Pop.	±%
1921	2,421	−3.5%
1931	2,123	−12.3%
1936	2,173	+2.4%
1951	2,353	+8.3%
1961	2,725	+15.8%

Year	Pop.	±%
1971	3,214	+17.9%
1981	3,360	+4.5%
1991	3,814	+13.5%
2001	4,233	+11.0%

Source: Data from ISTAT
