= Castelnuovo Bozzente =

- Comune
- Comune di Castelnuovo Bozzente
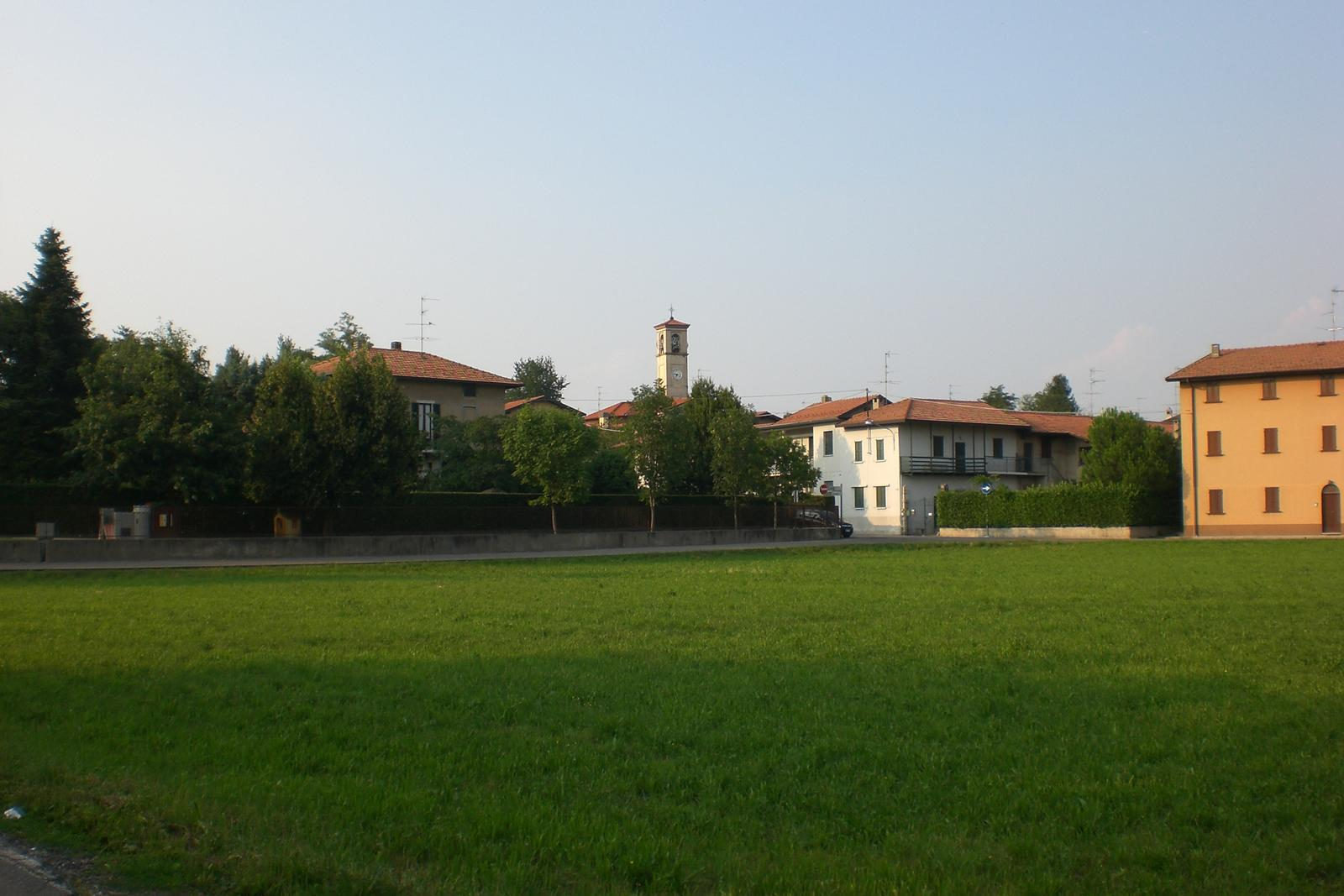

- Location within Italy Location within Lombardy
- Coordinates: 45°46′N 8°57′E
- Country: Italy
- Region: Lombardy
- Province: Province of Como (CO)

Area
  - Total: 3.7 km^{2} (1.4 sq mi)

Population (Dec. 2004)
  - Total: 810
  - Density: 220/km^{2} (570/sq mi)
- Time zone: UTC+1 (CET)
  - Summer (DST): UTC+2 (CEST)
- Postal code: 22070
- Dialing code: 031

Castelnuovo Bozzente (Comasco: Castelnoeuv [kaʃtelˈnøːf]) is a comune (municipality) in the Province of Como in the Italian region of Lombardy, about 35 kilometres (22 mi) northwest of Milan and 12 kilometres (7 mi) southwest of Como. As of 31 December 2004, it had a population of 810 and an area of 3.7 square kilometres (1.4 mi^{2}).

Castelnuovo Bozzente borders the following municipalities: Appiano Gentile, Beregazzo con Figliaro, Binago, Tradate, Venegono Inferiore.

== Demographic evolution ==
Historical population

Year	Pop.	±%
1861	482	—
1871	562	+16.6%
1881	446	−20.6%
1901	460	+3.1%
1911	471	+2.4%

Year	Pop.	±%
1921	535	+13.6%
1931	595	+11.2%
1936	543	−8.7%
1951	561	+3.3%
1961	575	+2.5%

Year	Pop.	±%
1971	583	+1.4%
1981	568	−2.6%
1991	633	+11.4%
2001	777	+22.7%

Source: Data from ISTAT
