= Villa Vigoni =

Historical property and foundation in Italy

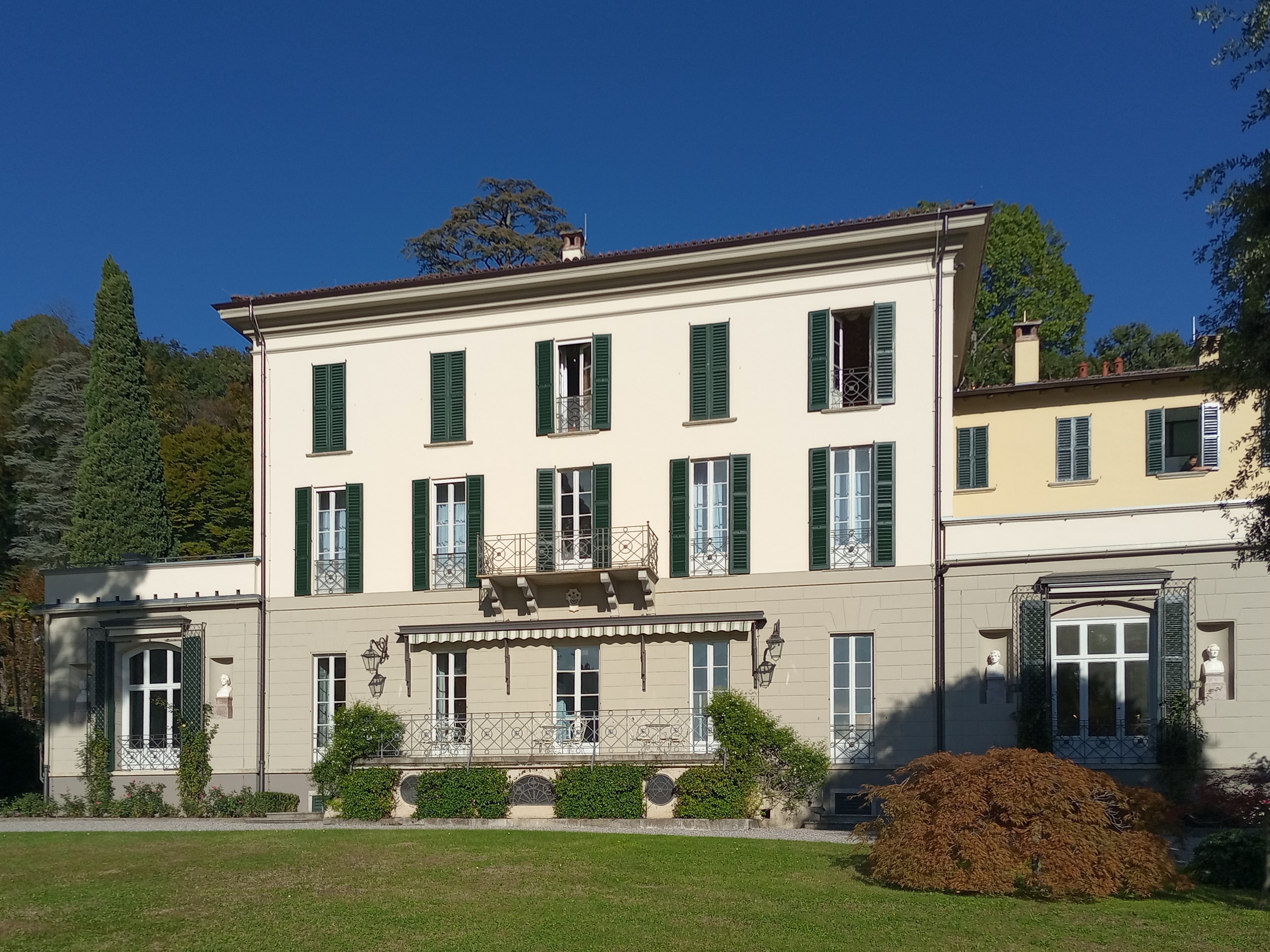
Villa Vigoni

Villa Vigoni refers to both a historical property and a non-profit organization in Loveno, a section of Menaggio on Lake Como, Italy. The property, sometimes referred to as Villa Mylius Vigoni, was remodeled in its current form in 1830. The non-profit, also known as the German-Italian Centre for European Dialogue (German: Deutsch-Italienisches Zentrum für den Europäischen Dialog, Italian: Centro italo-tedesco per il dialogo europeo) was established in 1986; it uses the Villa Vigoni property and the nearby Villa Garovaglio Ricci, also referred to simply as Villa Garovaglio.

== History ==
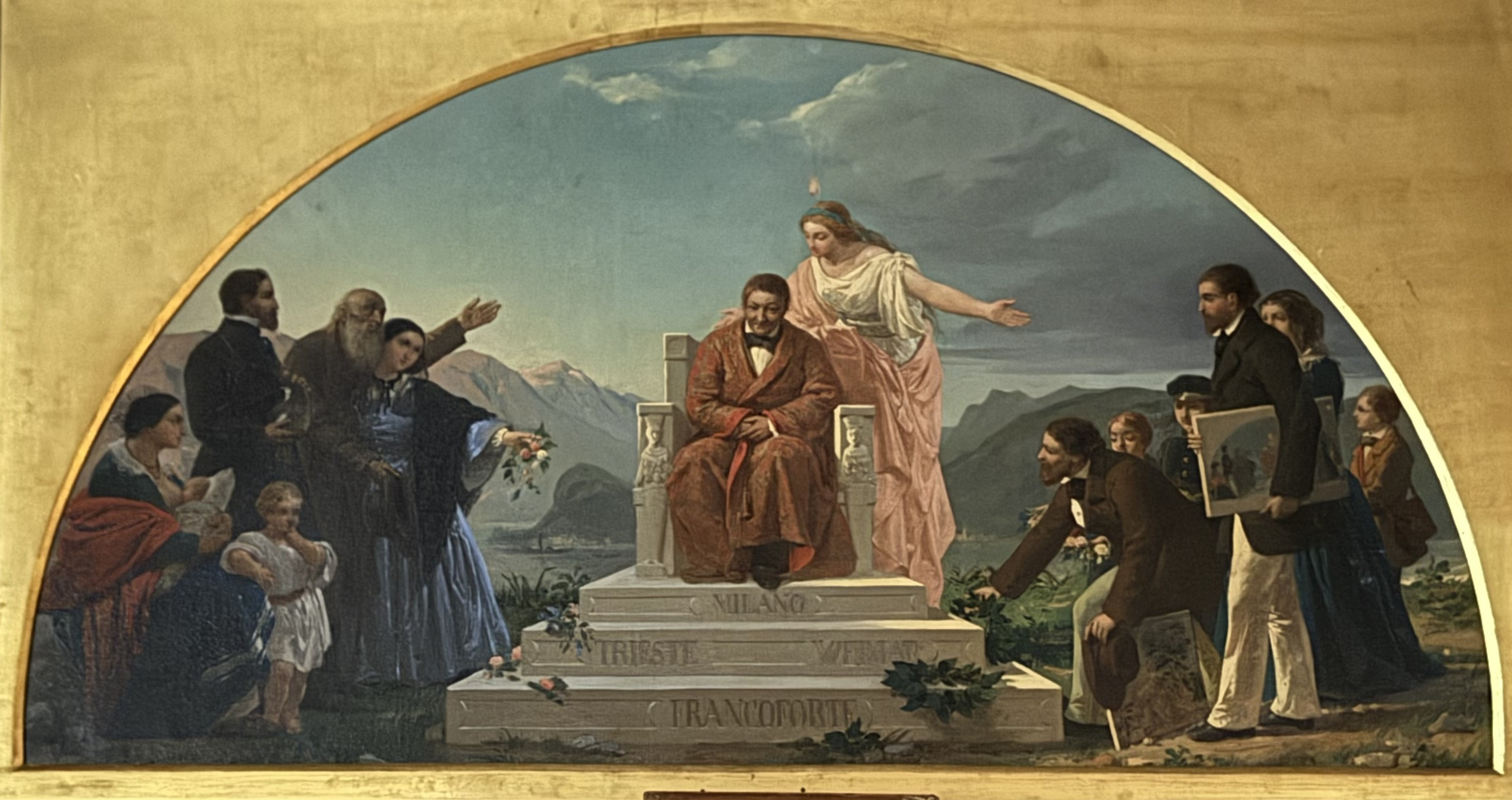
Citizens' Gratitude, 1859 sketch by Agostino Caironi for a fresco celebrating Enrico Mylius's generosity to the Brera Academy, oil on canvas kept at Villa Vigoni

The main building of Villa Vigoni appears to have been originally erected in the first half of the 18th century, on a hillside above the western shore of Lake Como above Menaggio, and owned by the local Carabelli family.

=== Mylius family ===
Heinrich Mylius was a successful businessman born in Frankfurt who had relocated to Milan in 1794, and subsequently went by Enrico Mylius. In 1829, he acquired the property as a wedding gift intended for his son Giulio Napoleone and the latter's fiancée Luigia Vitali. In 1830, Mylius hired architect Gaetano Besia who added a third floor and side wings.

The wedding was delayed by the opposition of Luigia's mother Matilde, of the aristocratic house of Arese, who objected to her daughter marrying a Protestant. Eventually, Giulio and Luigia traveled to Trieste to take advantage of the Kingdom of Illyria's more lenient interreligious marriage practices, but Giulio fell ill and died there a few days after the wedding ceremony. Giulia was subsequently treated by Enrico and Federica Mylius as their daughter, and kept the property.

=== Vigoni Family ===
In 1835, Luigia remarried with Ignazio Vigoni, a Milanese business associate of Enrico Mylius. Giuseppe, their fourth son, was born on 9 July 1846 and subsequently inherited the villa. He married Catulla Mylius (1875-1973), herself a daughter of Friedrich (Federico) Mylius (1838-1891) and thus descendant of Enrico Mylius's elder brother Johann Jakob (1756-1835). Their only son, who was named Ignazio like his paternal grandfather and had met Konrad Adenauer during the latter's stay by Lake Como in 1964, bequeathed the villa to the German state in a will of 1978.

Giuseppe, Catulla and Ignazio Jr all rest in the nearby cemetery of Loveno di Menaggio, which had been created in 1850 by Enrico Mylius for the permanent burial of his son Giulio, and where he and his wife Friederike rest as well.

=== German-Italian Centre ===
Following Ignazio Vigoni Jr's bequeath, negotiations between respective foreign ministers Hans-Dietrich Genscher (Germany) and Giulio Andreotti (Italy) led to the establishment in 1986 of a German registered association with a unique governance associating both governments as well as various additional stakeholders. The association manages the program of conferences and other activities, with over 80 events every year by the late 2010s. The German state remains the owner of the properties and finances their upkeep. The main building of Villa Vigoni was restored in the mid-1990s and again in the early 2020s.

Villa Vigoni was the location of several encounters between German and Italian heads of state, such as the meeting of Johannes Rau and Carlo Azeglio Ciampi on 18 April 2002, and that of Christian Wulff and Giorgio Napolitano on 11 July 2011. Since 2010, Villa Vigoni has hosted an annual seminar dedicated to policy challenges of the euro area.

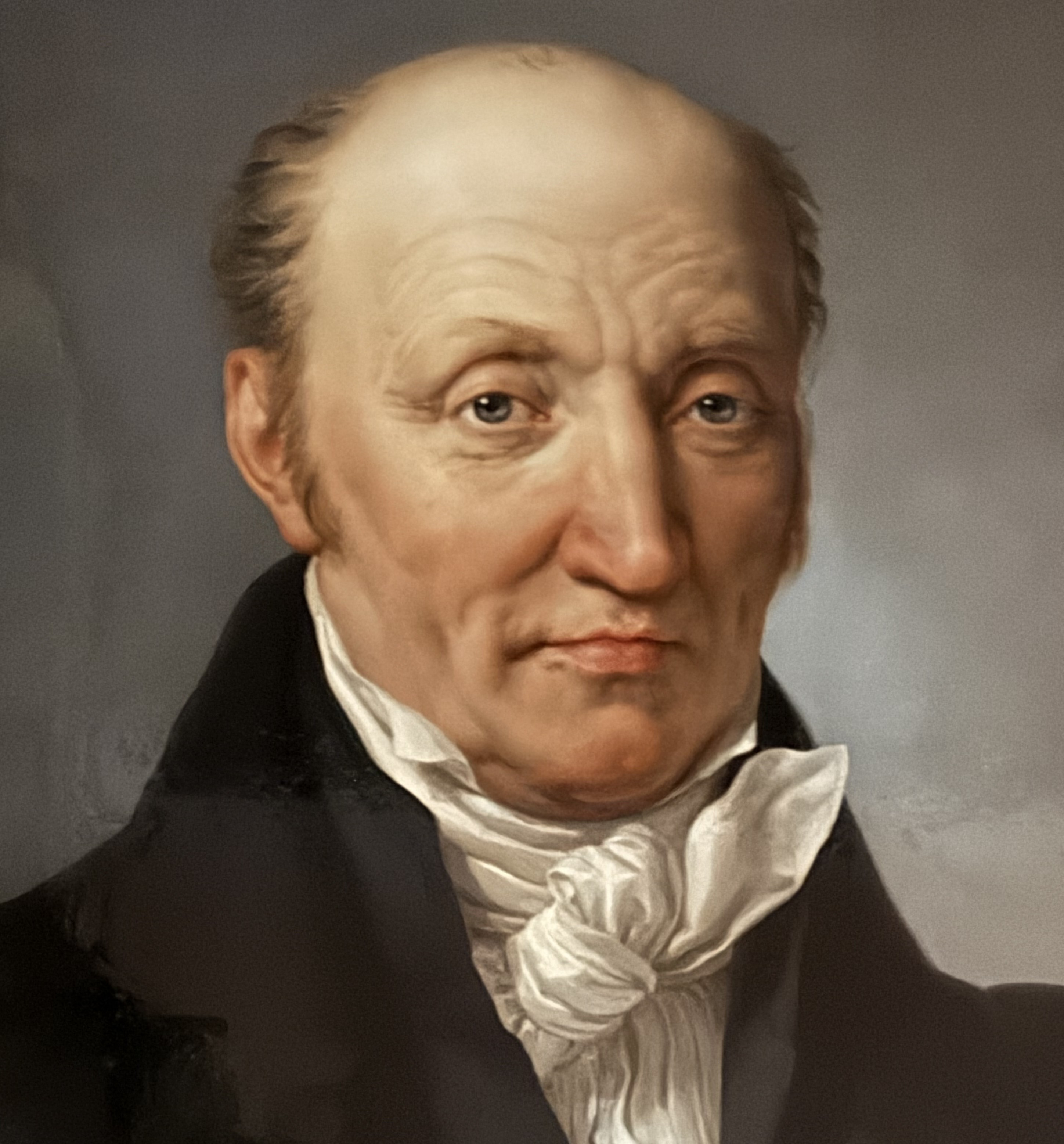
Heinrich (Enrico) Mylius (1769-1854), portrait by Pelagio Palagi (1831) kept at Villa Vigoni

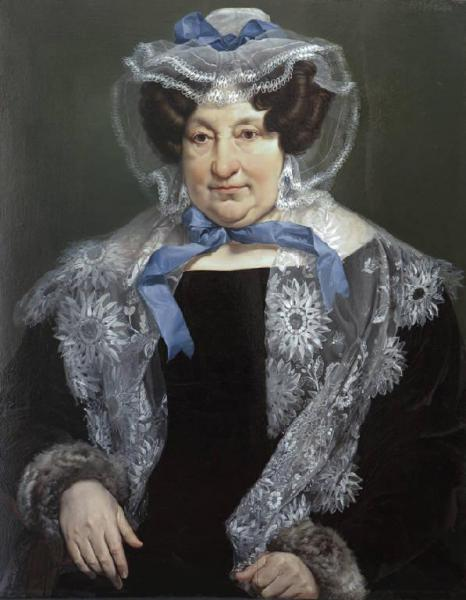
Friederike (Federica) Mylius née Schnauss (1771-1851), portrait by Francesco Hayez (1828), Villa Vigoni

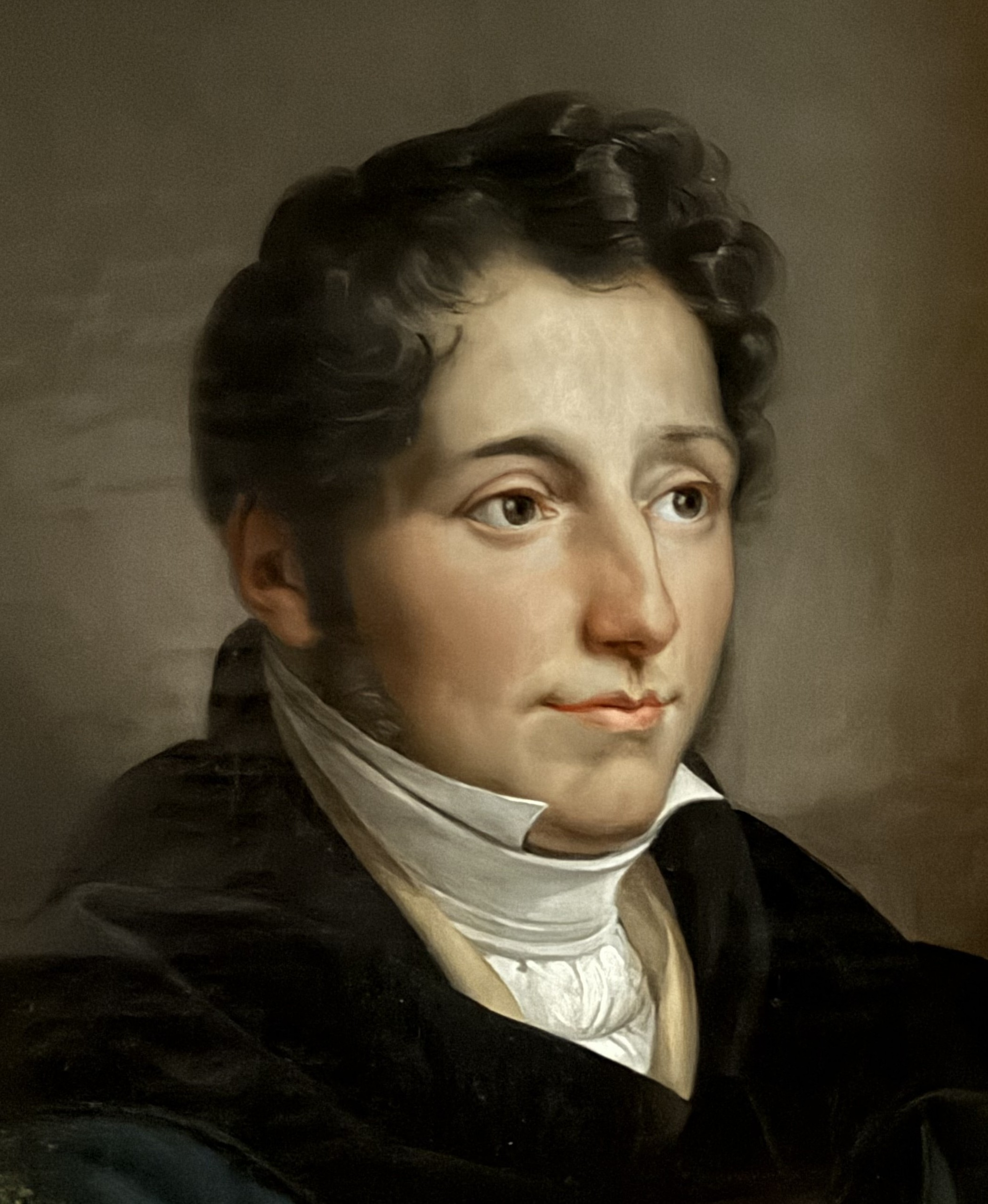
Julius (Giulio) Mylius (1800-1830), postmortem portrait by Francesco Hayez (1842), villa Vigoni

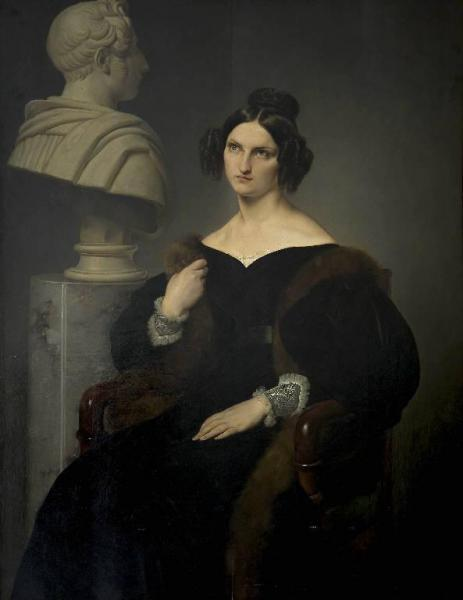
Luigia Vitali Mylius Vigoni (1809-1884) with Giulio's bust by Marchesi, portrait by Hayez (1832), Villa Vigoni

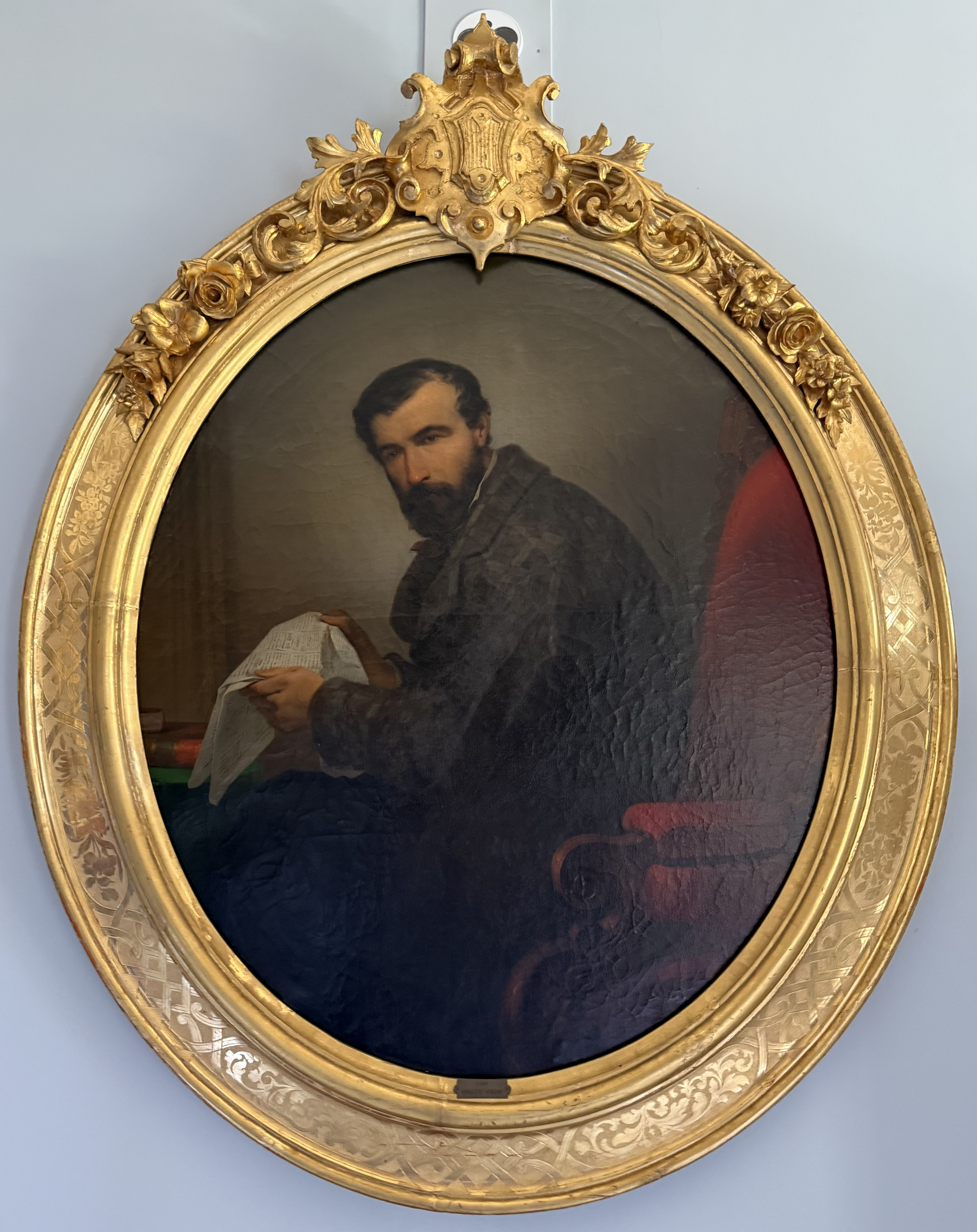
Ignazio Vigoni (1808-1860), postmortem portrait by Giovanni Servi (1861), Villa Vigoni

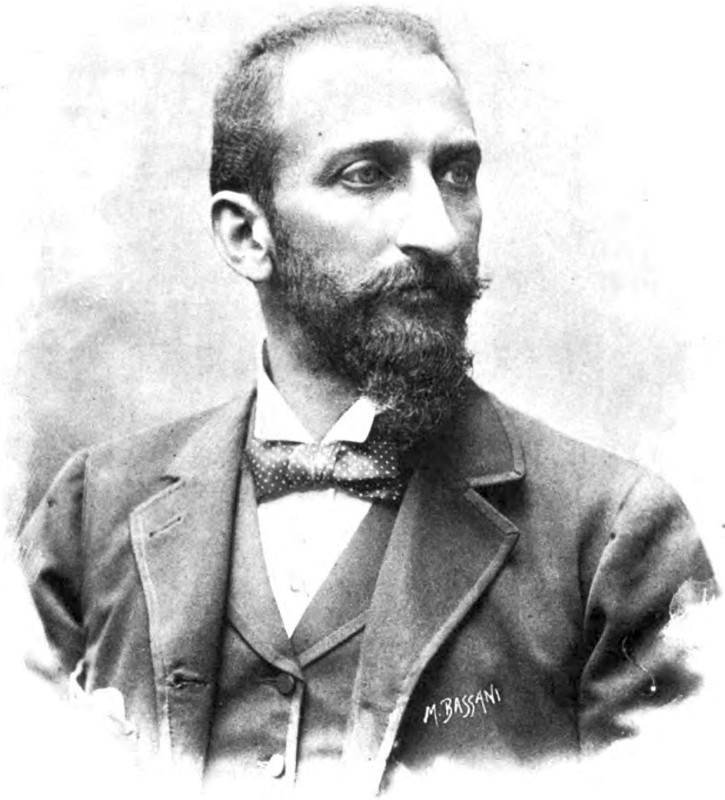
Giuseppe (Pippo) Vigoni (1846-1914), illustration in Rivista industriale e commerciale di Milano e provincia (1894), unknown author

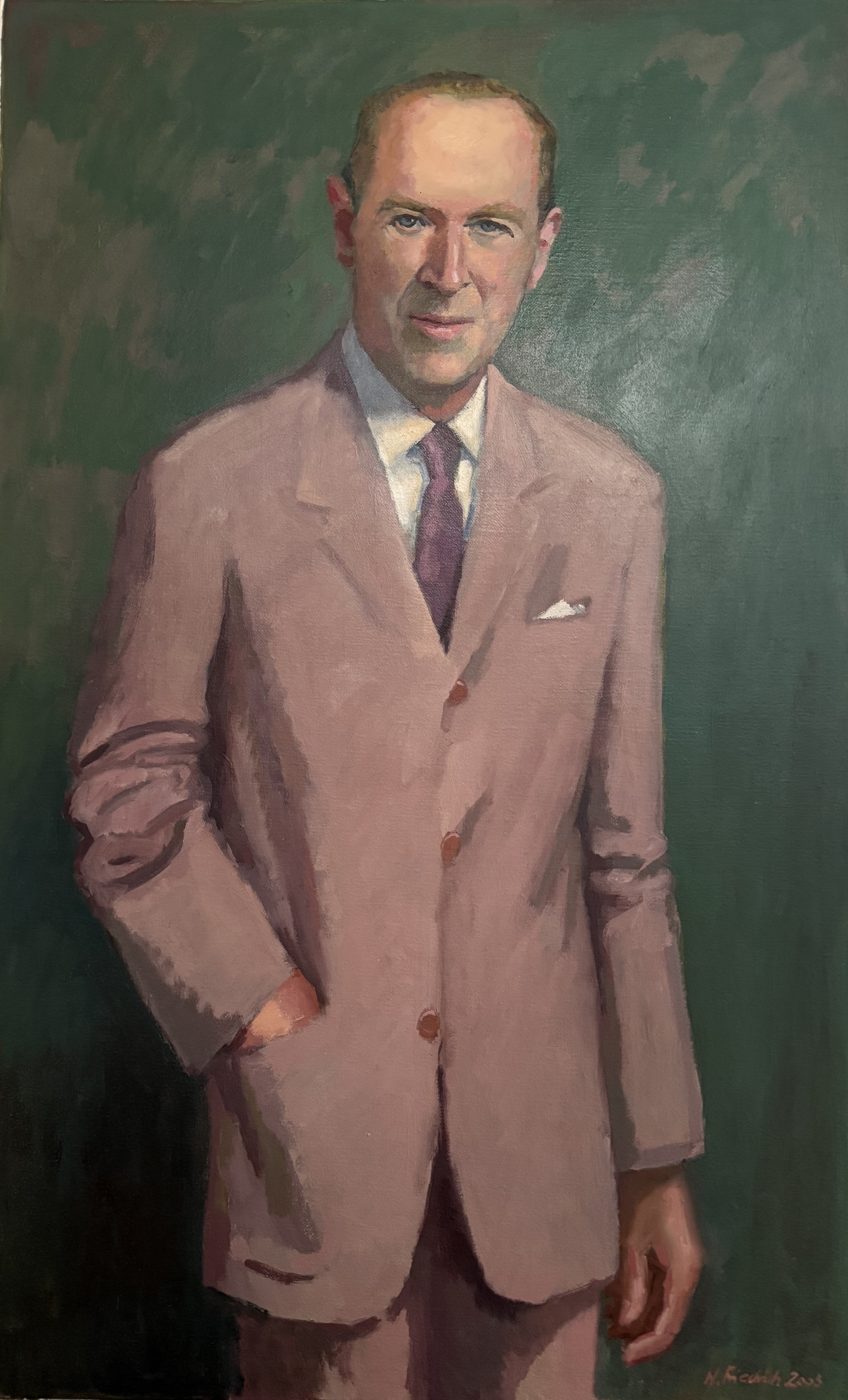
Ignazio Vigoni (1905-1983), postmortem portrait by N. Friedrich (2003), Villa Vigoni

== Description ==
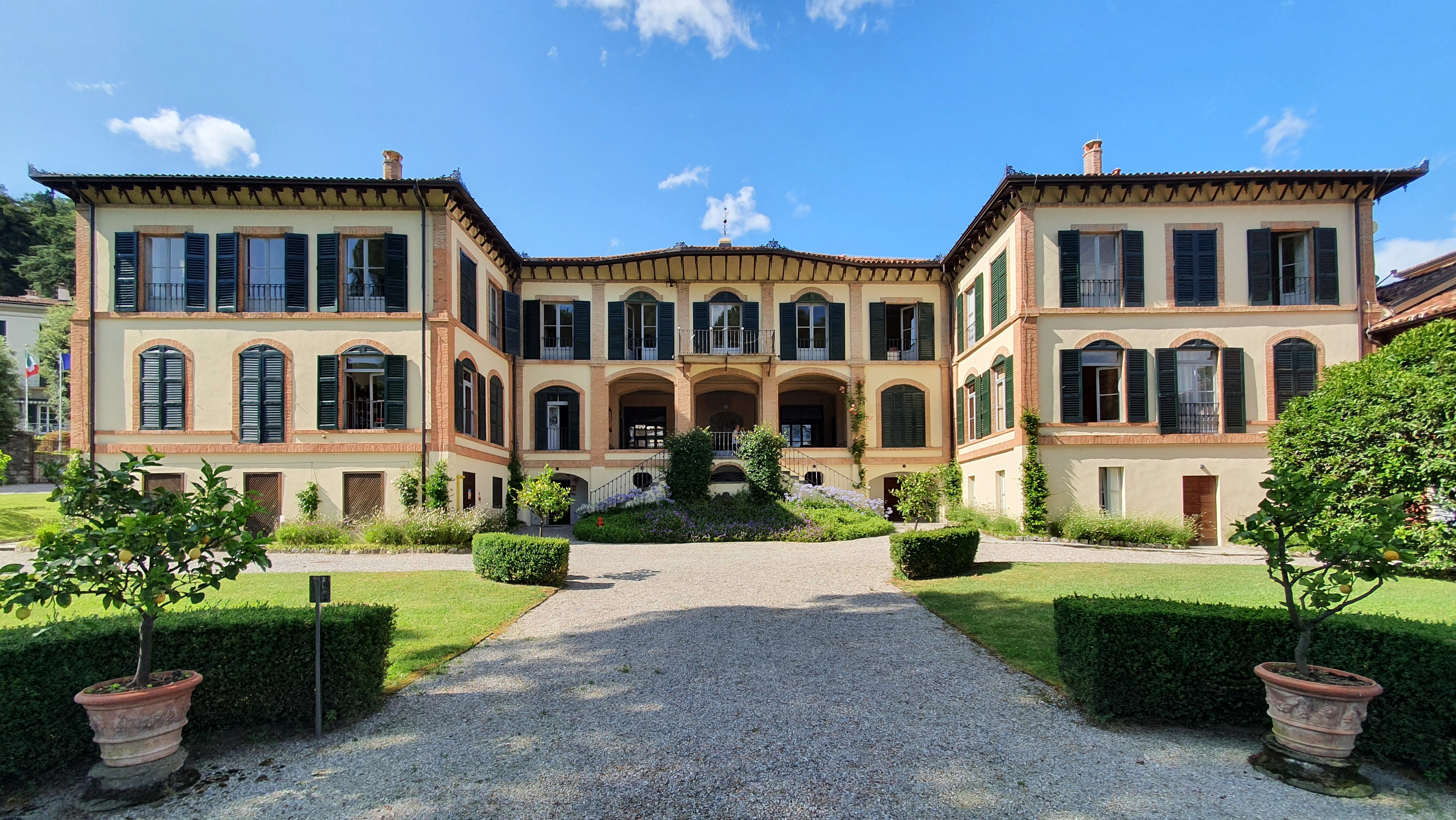
Villa Garovaglio Ricci

Villa Mylius Vigoni still stands largely as remodeled by Besia in 1830. It features a ground floor and two floors above, with single-floor wings on both sides. The façade of the side wings facing Lake Como is decorated with busts of four notable acquaintances of the Mylius family: from west to east, Antonio Kramer (1854), Gaetano Cattaneo, Alessandro Manzoni, and Eduard Rüppell.

The English-style garden was rearranged between 1855 and 1865 by Giuseppe Balzaretto. It includes the tempietto or cenotaph of Giulio Mylius, designed by Besia and built in 1831; that structure's interior features two marble slabs depicting the death of Giulio on one side, by Pompeo Marchesi (1832), and Nemesis on the other side, by Bertel Thorvaldsen (1835), complemented with two busts of Giulio and Enrico Mylius, also by Marchesi. The garden has additional sculptures by Giosuè Argenti.

The building known as Villa Garovaglio, standing on the hillside below Villa Vigoni, was first documented in the 18th century when it was probably used as a silk mill by Como-based musician Francesco Pasquale Ricci (1732-1817). In 1760, his sister Maria Giovanna Ricci married Como pharmacist Sante Garovaglio; their son Pasquale (1773-1856) married Rosa Maria Boldrini or Boldroni, from the nearby town of Cantù. In 1872, Pasquale and Rosa's eldest son Alfonso Garovaglio (1820-1905) commissioned Lodovico Pogliaghi to remodel it, giving it its current shape. Ignazio Vigoni Jr purchased it in 1966 from the Cazzani e Nuvoloni family, out of fear that it might be transformed into a hotel. In the early 1990s, it was complemented with a state-of-the-art conference room designed by German architect Barbara Jakubeit.

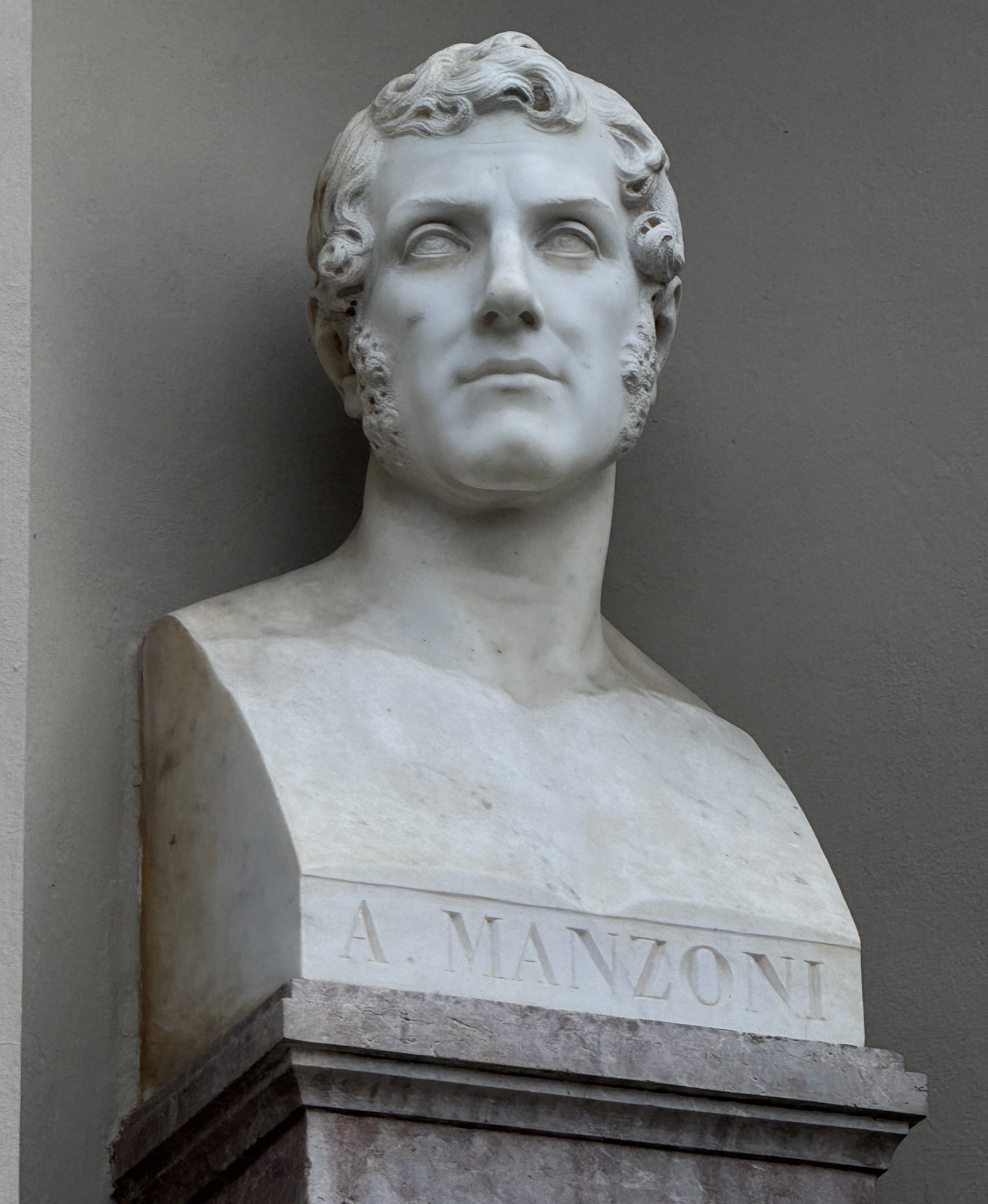
Bust of Manzoni on Villa Vigoni's façade

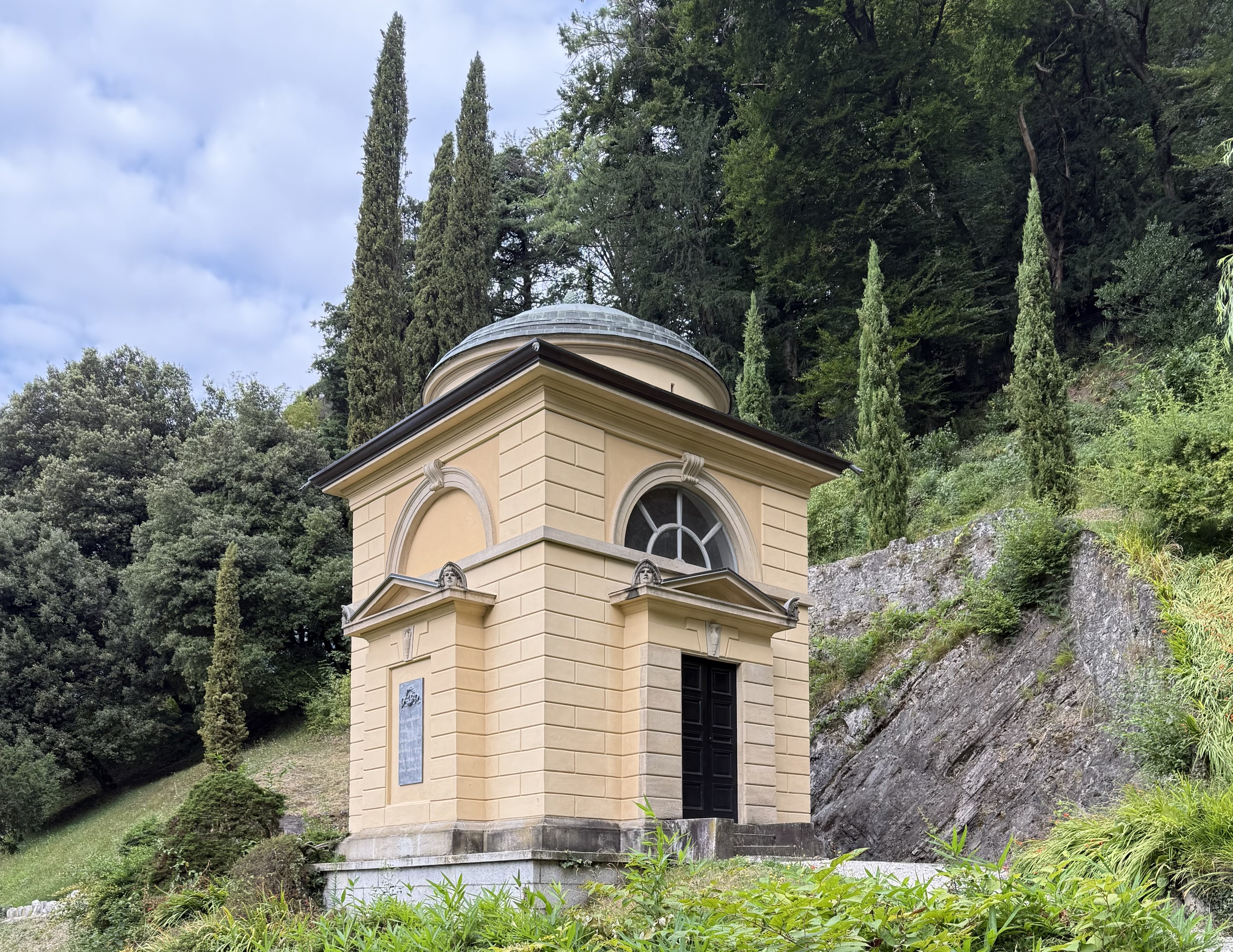
Memorial tempietto of Giulio Vigoni in the park

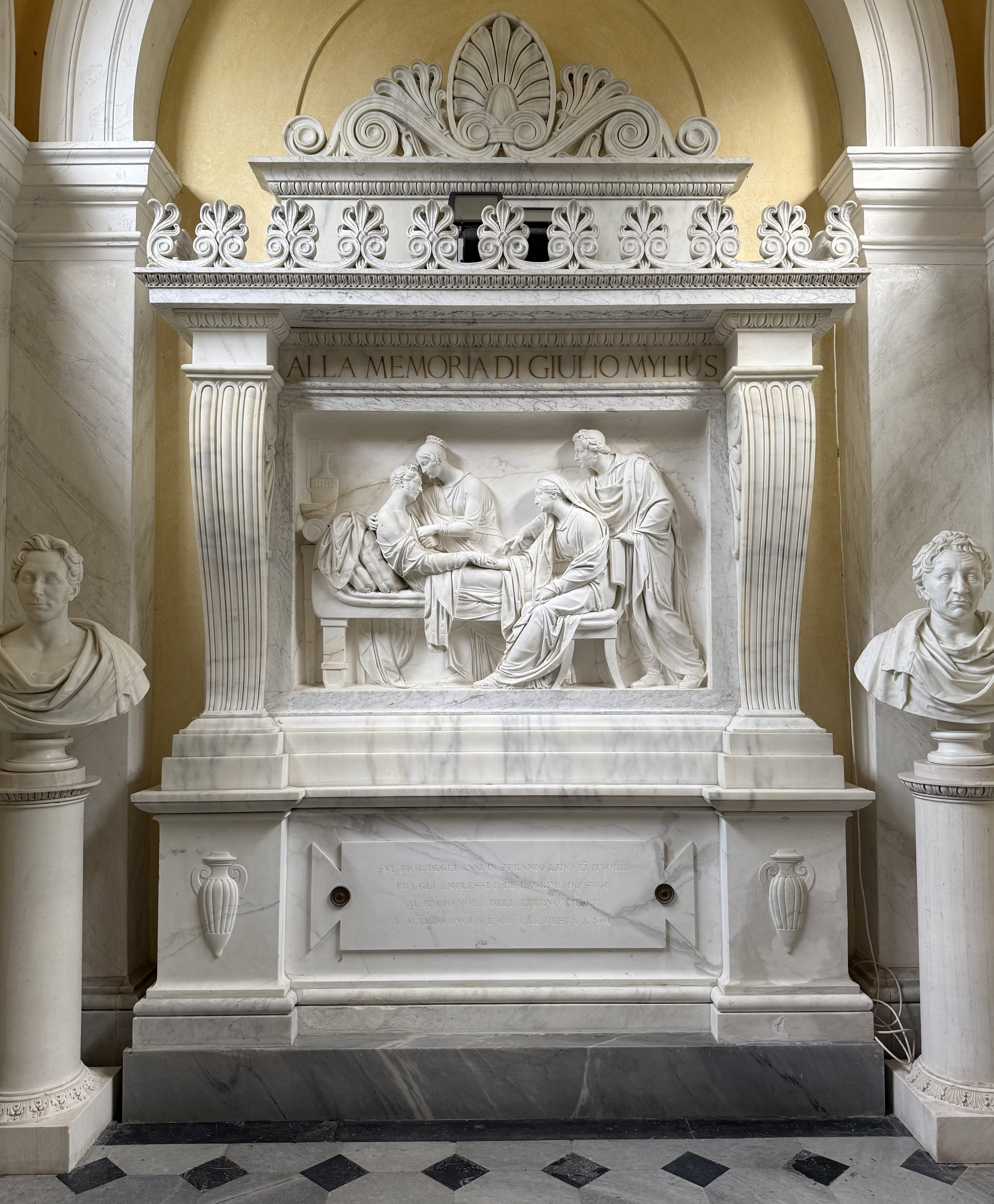
Death of Giulio relief by Pompeo Marchesi (1832)

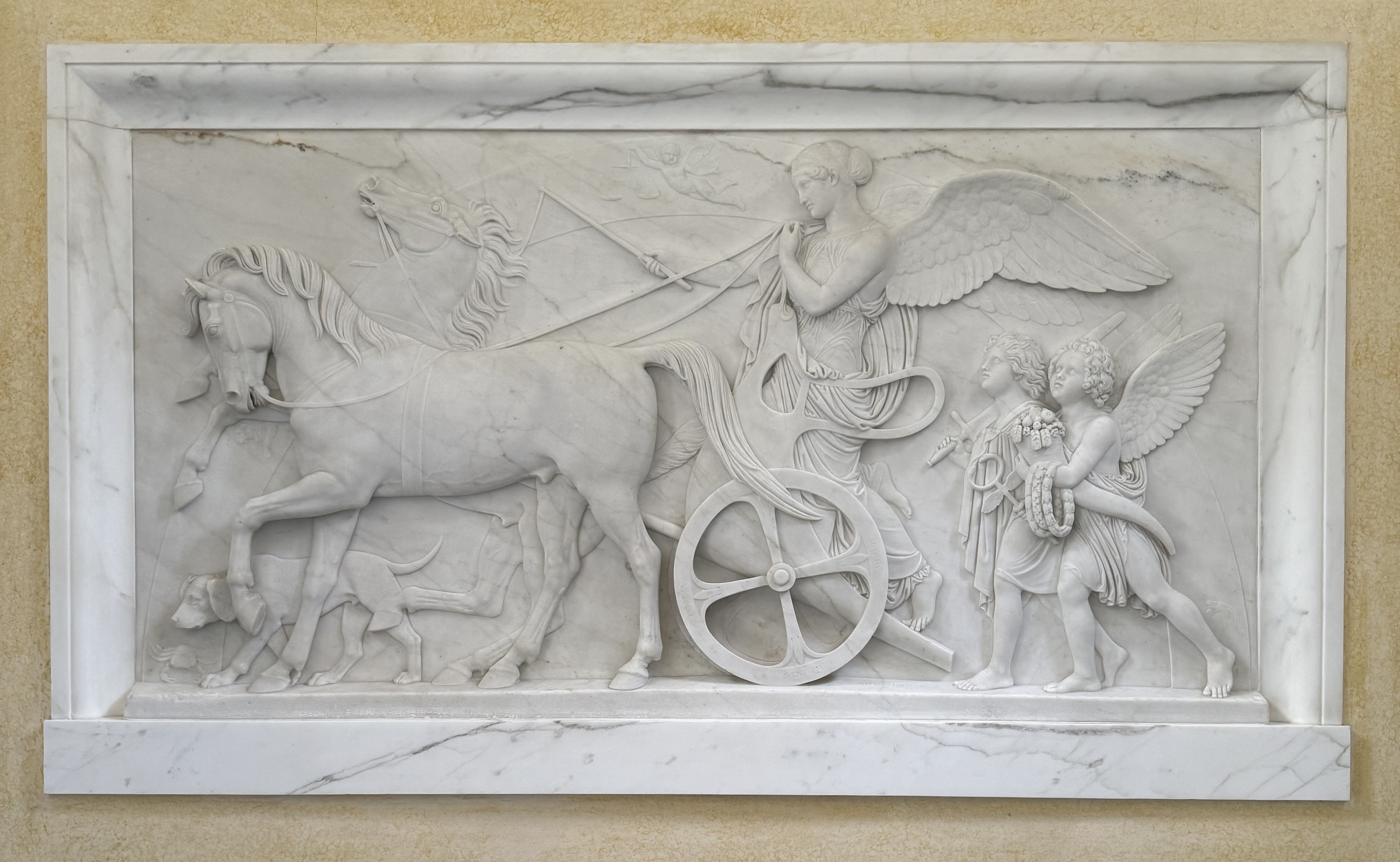
Nemesis by Bertel Thorvaldsen (1835)

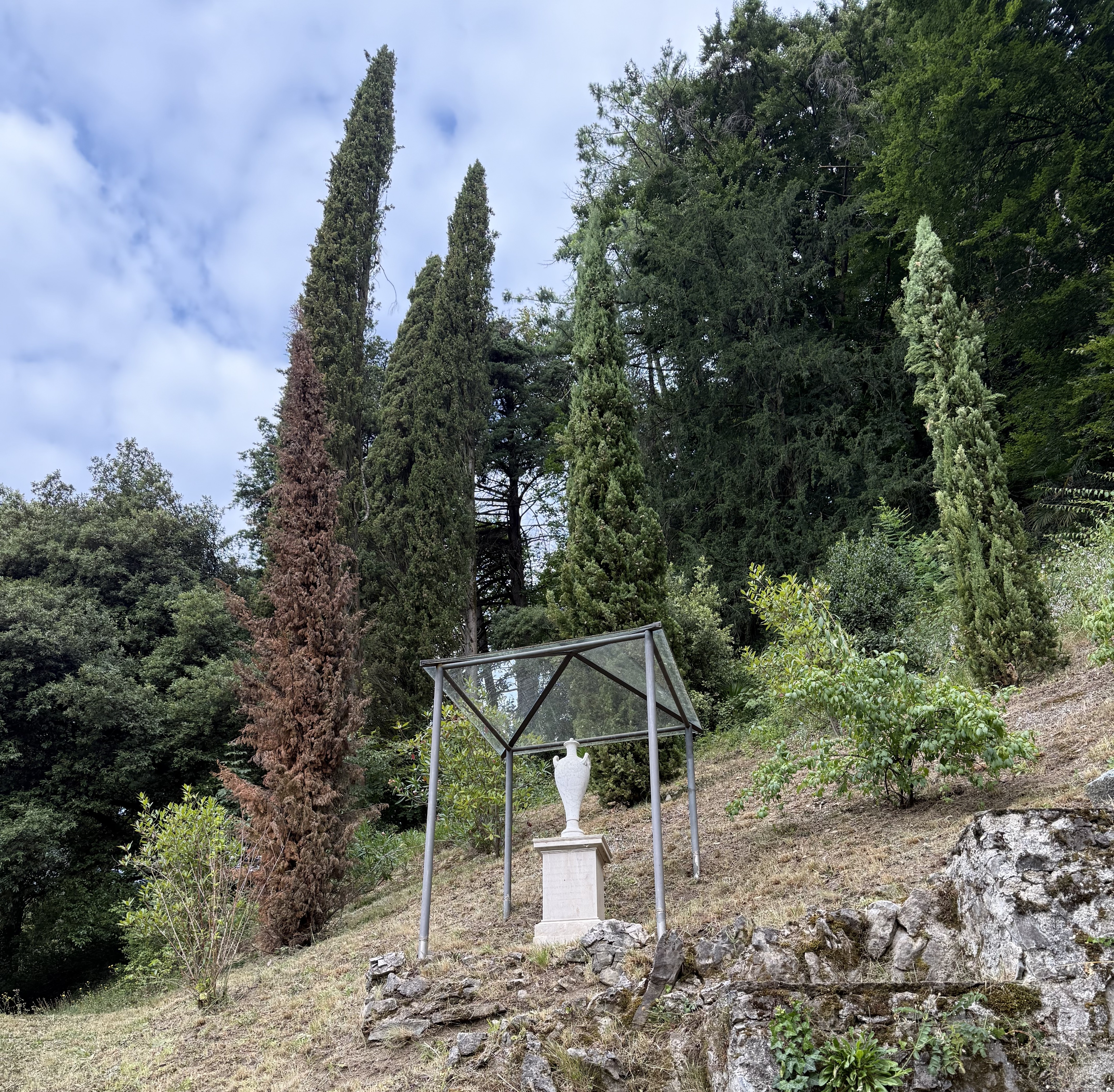
Memorial urn of Teresa Vigoni (1844-1846) in the park, by Giovanni Servi (1848)

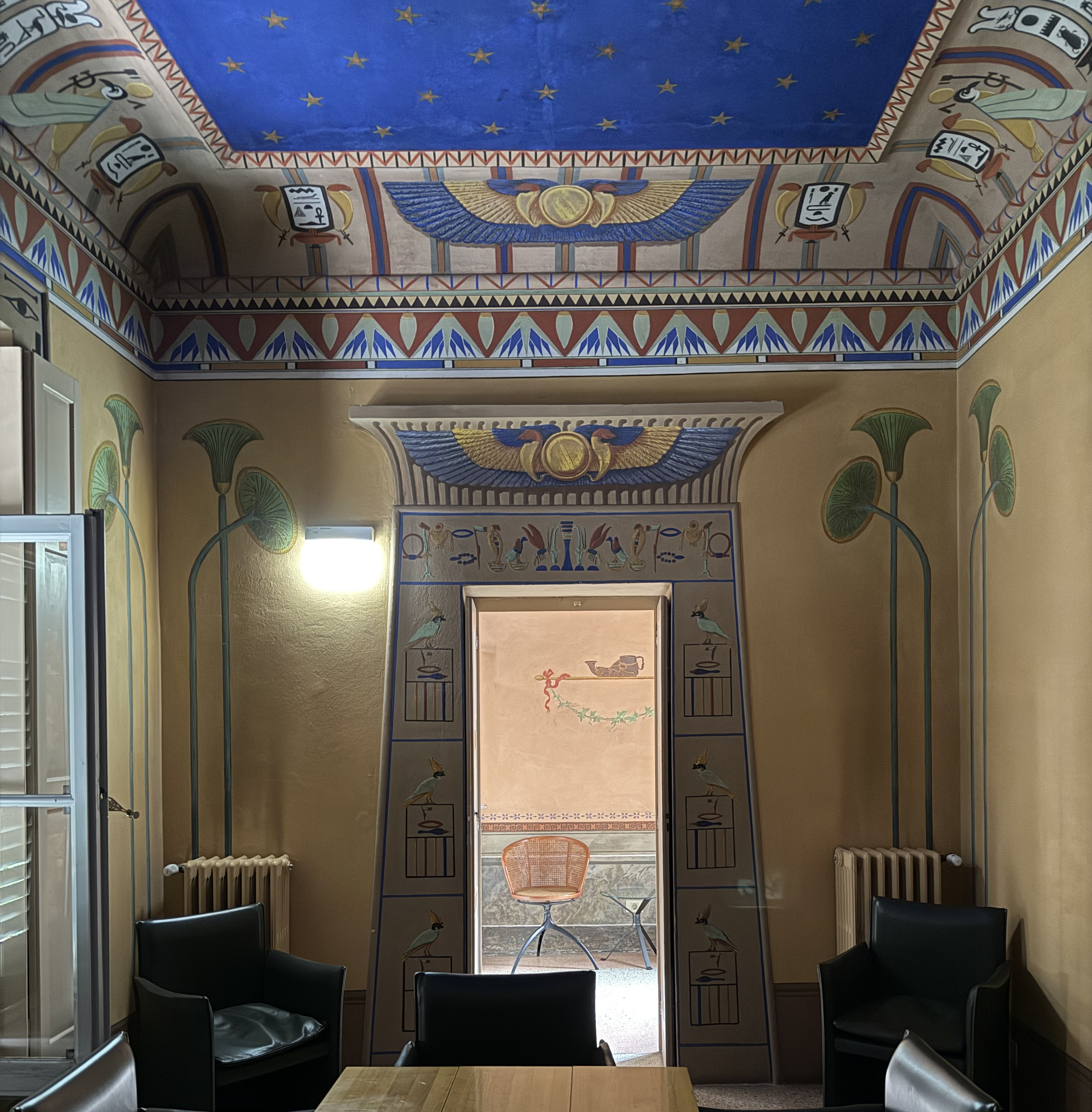
Egyptian room in Villa Garovaglio, decorated in the 1870s or 1880s

== See also ==
- Villa del Balbianello
- Villa Bernasconi
- Villa Carlotta
- Villa Erba
- Villa d'Este, Cernobbio
- Villa Melzi
- Villa Monastero
- Villa Olmo
- Villa Serbelloni
- Jurisdictional Immunities of the State
