= Venegono Inferiore =

- Comune
- Comune di Venegono Inferiore
- Location within Italy Location within Lombardy
- Coordinates: 45°44′N 8°54′E
- Country: Italy
- Region: Lombardy
- Province: Province of Varese (VA)

Area
  - Total: 5.8 km^{2} (2.2 sq mi)
- Elevation: 345 m (1,132 ft)

Population (Dec. 2018)
  - Total: 6,097
  - Density: 1,100/km^{2} (2,700/sq mi)
- Demonym: Venegonesi
- Time zone: UTC+1 (CET)
  - Summer (DST): UTC+2 (CEST)
- Postal code: 21040
- Dialing code: 0331
- Website: Official website

Venegono Inferiore is a comune (municipality) in the Province of Varese in the Italian region Lombardy, located about 35 kilometres (22 mi) northwest of Milan and about 11 kilometres (7 mi) southeast of Varese. As of 31 December 2018, it had a population of 6,097 and an area of 5.8 square kilometres (2.2 mi^{2}).

Venegono Inferiore borders the following municipalities: Binago, Castelnuovo Bozzente, Castiglione Olona, Gornate-Olona, Lonate Ceppino, Tradate, Venegono Superiore.

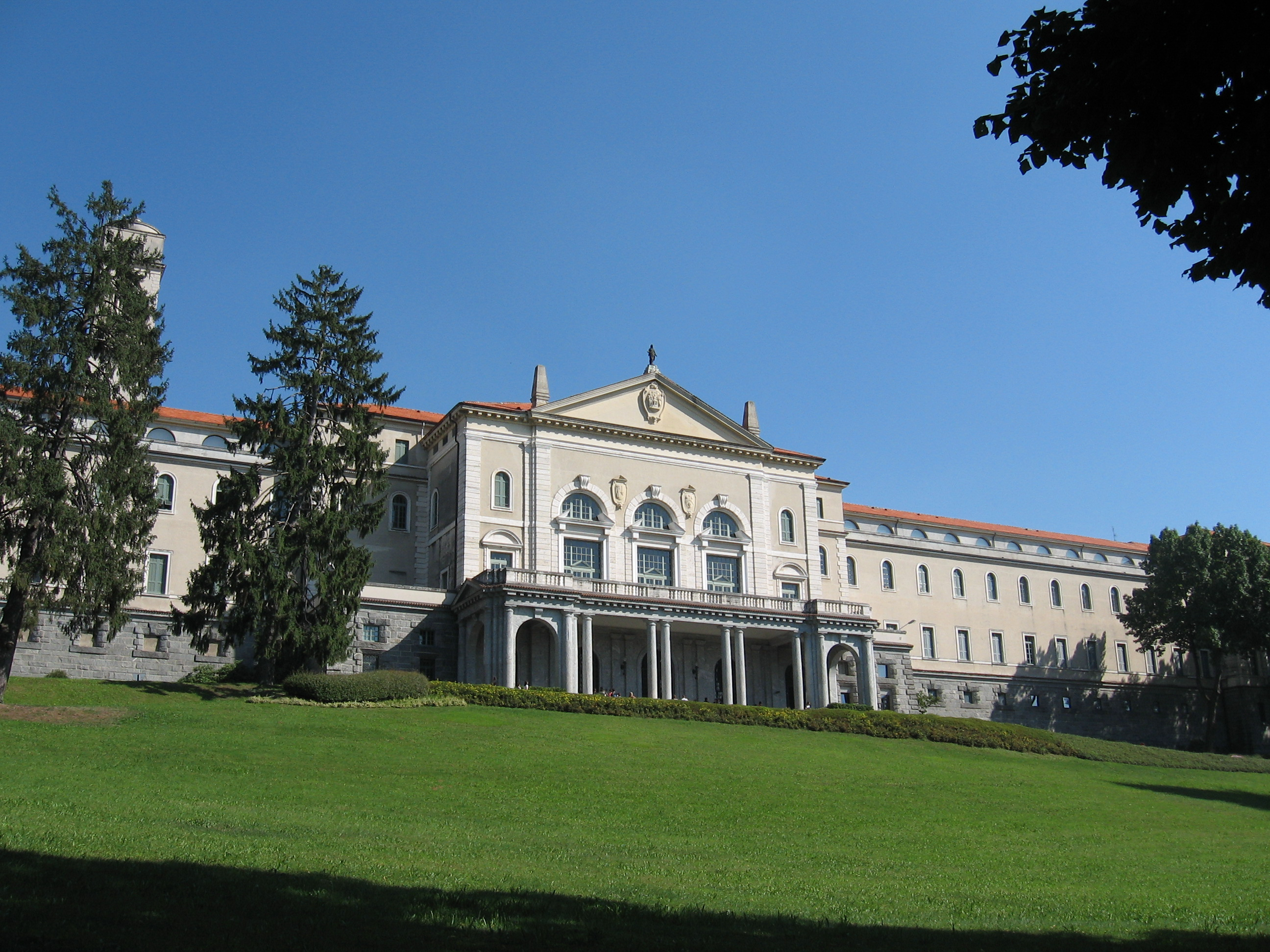
Seminario Arcivescovile di Milano, Venegono Inferiore

Venegono Inferiore is named as the see of the seminary of the Roman Catholic Archdiocese of Milan, one of the biggest in Italy.

== Demographic evolution ==
Historical population

Year	Pop.	±%
1861	929	—
1871	970	+4.4%
1881	1,075	+10.8%
1901	1,201	+11.7%
1911	1,413	+17.7%

Year	Pop.	±%
1921	1,576	+11.5%
1931	2,055	+30.4%
1936	2,128	+3.6%
1951	2,604	+22.4%
1961	3,127	+20.1%

Year	Pop.	±%
1971	4,357	+39.3%
1981	5,152	+18.2%
1991	5,645	+9.6%
2001	5,746	+1.8%

Source: Data from ISTAT

== Elections ==
On 25 May 2014 the candidate Mattia Premazzi was elected as the mayor of the city. On 12 June 2019, Premazzi began his second mandate as the mayor of Venegono Inferiore, for the next 5 years, after winning the elections in May.
