= Venegono Superiore =

- Comune
- Comune di Venegono Superiore
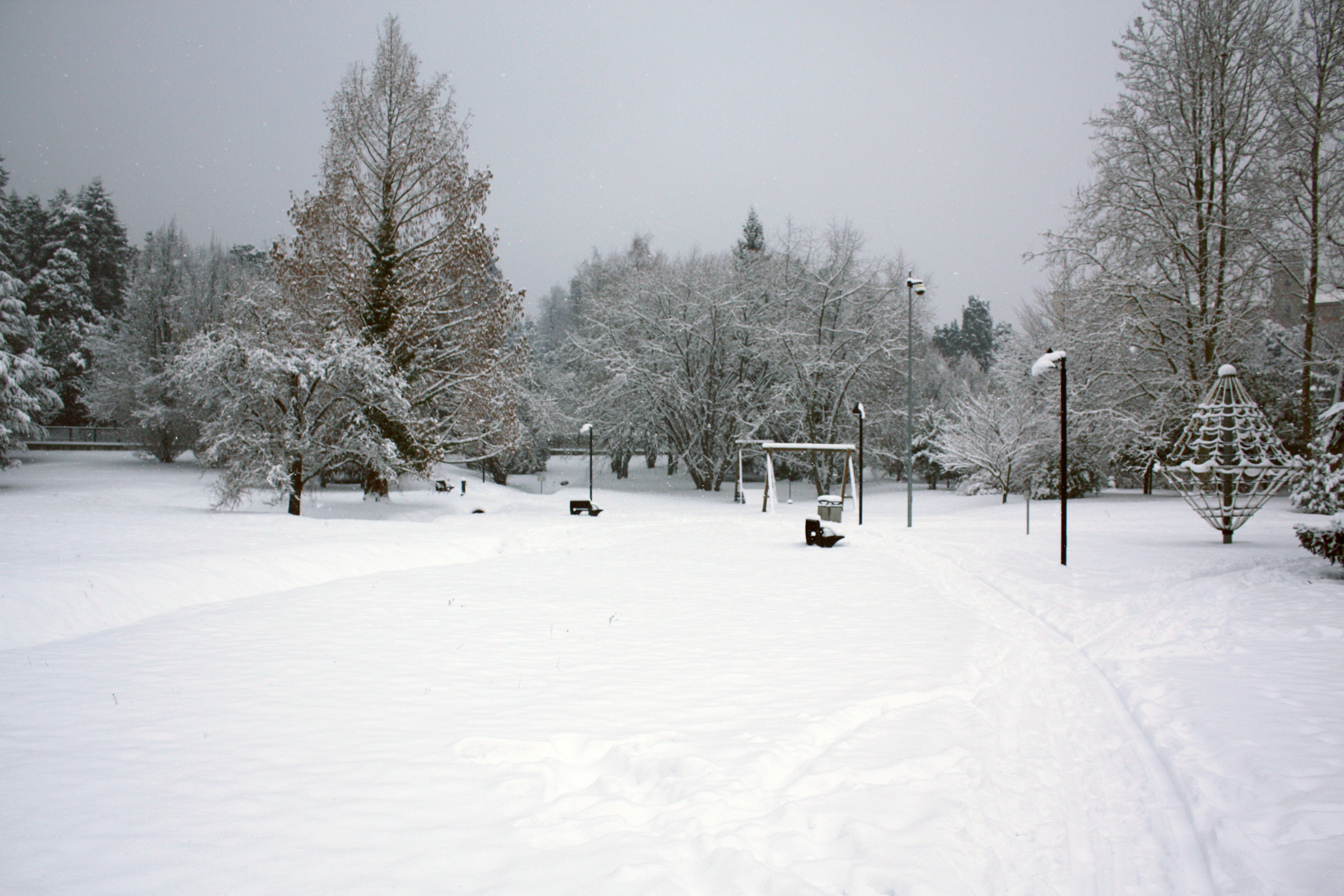

- Coat of arms

- Location within Italy Location within Lombardy
- Coordinates: 45°45′N 8°54′E
- Country: Italy
- Region: Lombardy
- Province: Province of Varese (VA)
- Frazioni: San Martino, Pianasca, Pianbosco

Government
  - Mayor: Ambrogio Crespi

Area
  - Total: 6.9 km^{2} (2.7 sq mi)
- Elevation: 331 m (1,086 ft)

Population (28 February 2017)
  - Total: 7,300
  - Density: 1,100/km^{2} (2,700/sq mi)
- Demonym: Venegonesi
- Time zone: UTC+1 (CET)
  - Summer (DST): UTC+2 (CEST)
- Postal code: 21040
- Dialing code: 0331
- Website: Official website

Venegono Superiore is a comune (municipality) in the Province of Varese in the Italian region Lombardy, located about 40 kilometres (25 mi) northwest of Milan and about 9 kilometres (6 mi) southeast of Varese.

Venegono Superiore borders the following municipalities: Binago, Castiglione Olona, Vedano Olona, Venegono Inferiore.

Alenia Aeronautica has its head office in Venegono Superiore.
