= Appiano Gentile =

- Comune
- Comune di Appiano Gentile
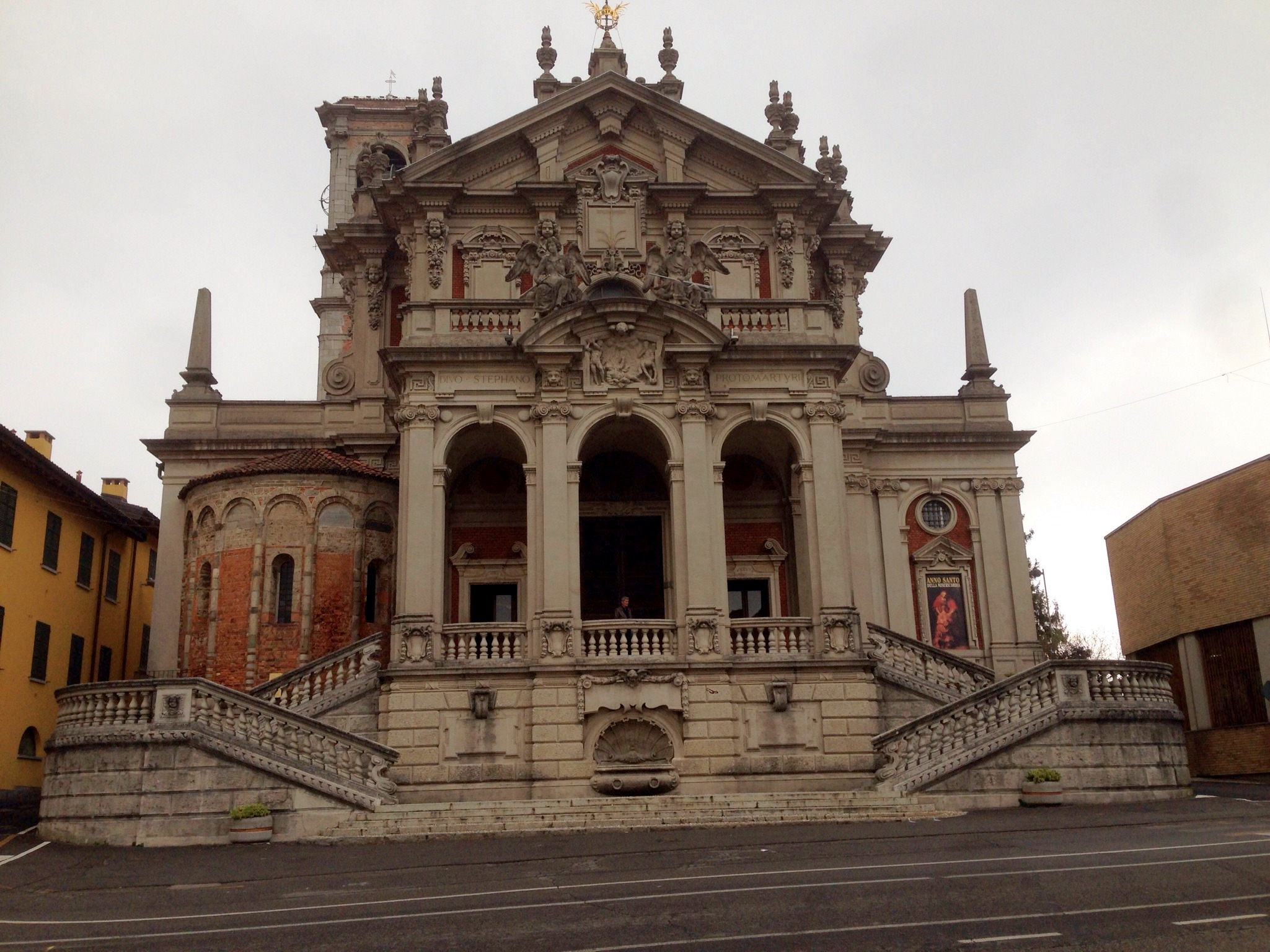
- Church of Santo Stefano, Appiano Gentile

- Coat of arms

- Location of Appiano Gentile in Italy Appiano Gentile (Lombardy)
- Coordinates: 45°44′N 8°58′E
- Country: Italy
- Region: Lombardy
- Province: Como (CO)
- Frazioni: San Bartolomeo al Bosco

Government
  - Mayor: Pagani Giovanni Gaetano

Area
  - Total: 12.9 km^{2} (5.0 sq mi)
- Elevation: 366 m (1,201 ft)

Population (1 October 2008)
  - Total: 7,835
  - Density: 607/km^{2} (1,570/sq mi)
- Demonym: Appianesi
- Time zone: UTC+1 (CET)
  - Summer (DST): UTC+2 (CEST)
- Postal code: 22070
- Dialing code: 031
- Patron saint: Saint Stephen
- Saint day: 26 december
- Website: Official website

Appiano Gentile (Comasco: Pian) is a comune (municipality) in the Province of Como in the Italian region Lombardy, located about 35 kilometres (22 mi) northwest of Milan and about 12 kilometres (7 mi) southwest of Como.

The city borders the following municipalities: Beregazzo con Figliaro, Bulgarograsso, Carbonate, Castelnuovo Bozzente, Guanzate, Lurago Marinone, Lurate Caccivio, Oltrona di San Mamette, Tradate (VA), Veniano

Appiano received the honorary title of city with a presidential decree of February 28, 2009.

The main sights is the church of Santo Stefano, housing works from Nuvolone and Isidoro Bianchi. The town is also home to the training ground of Serie A side Inter Milan.
