= Solbiate =

Solbiate Solbiaa (Lombard)
- Comune
- Comune di Solbiate
- Location within Italy Location within Lombardy
- Coordinates: 45°47′N 8°56′E
- Country: Italy
- Region: Lombardy
- Province: Province of Como (CO)
- Frazioni: Concagno

Government
  - Mayor: Giulio Colombo

Area
  - Total: 4.1 km^{2} (1.6 sq mi)
- Elevation: 445 m (1,460 ft)

Population (Dec. 2004)
  - Total: 2,360
  - Density: 580/km^{2} (1,500/sq mi)
- Demonym: Solbiatesi
- Time zone: UTC+1 (CET)
  - Summer (DST): UTC+2 (CEST)
- Postal code: 22070
- Dialing code: 031
- Patron saint: Alessandro
- Saint day: 26 August

Solbiate (Comasco: Solbiaa [sulˈbjaː]) is a comune (municipality) in the Province of Como in the Italian region Lombardy, located about 40 kilometres (25 mi) northwest of Milan and about 12 kilometres (7 mi) southwest of Como. As of 31 December 2004, it had a population of 2,360 and an area of 4.1 square kilometres (1.6 mi^{2}).

Solbiate borders the following municipalities: Albiolo, Beregazzo con Figliaro, Binago, Cagno, Malnate, Olgiate Comasco.

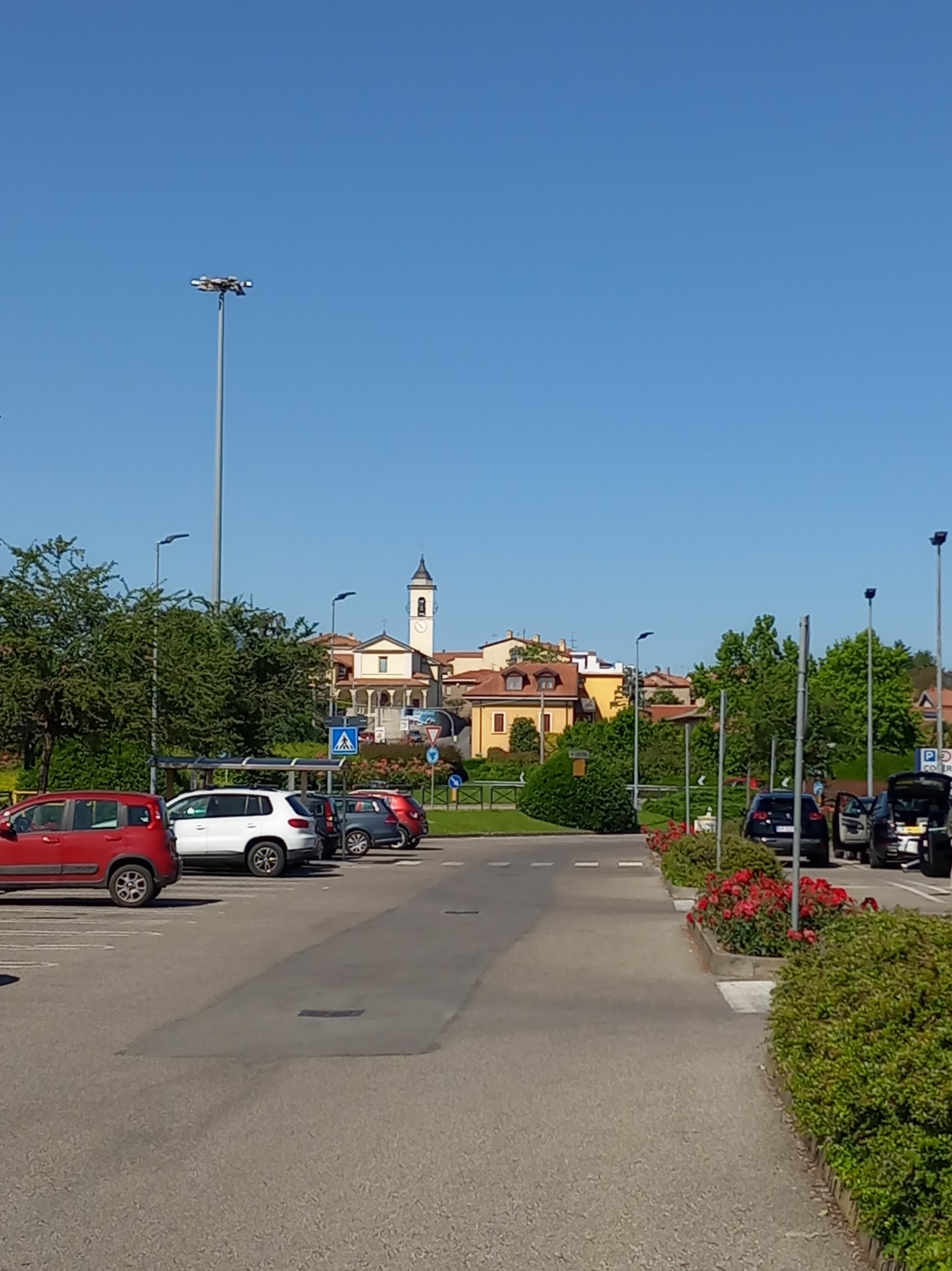
Solbiate

== Demographic evolution ==
Historical population

Year	Pop.	±%
1861	846	—
1871	865	+2.2%
1881	906	+4.7%
1901	992	+9.5%
1911	1,147	+15.6%

Year	Pop.	±%
1921	1,271	+10.8%
1931	1,136	−10.6%
1936	1,219	+7.3%
1951	1,322	+8.4%
1961	1,400	+5.9%

Year	Pop.	±%
1971	1,498	+7.0%
1981	1,865	+24.5%
1991	2,006	+7.6%
2001	2,248	+12.1%

Source: Data from ISTAT
