= Cantello =

- Comune
- Comune di Cantello
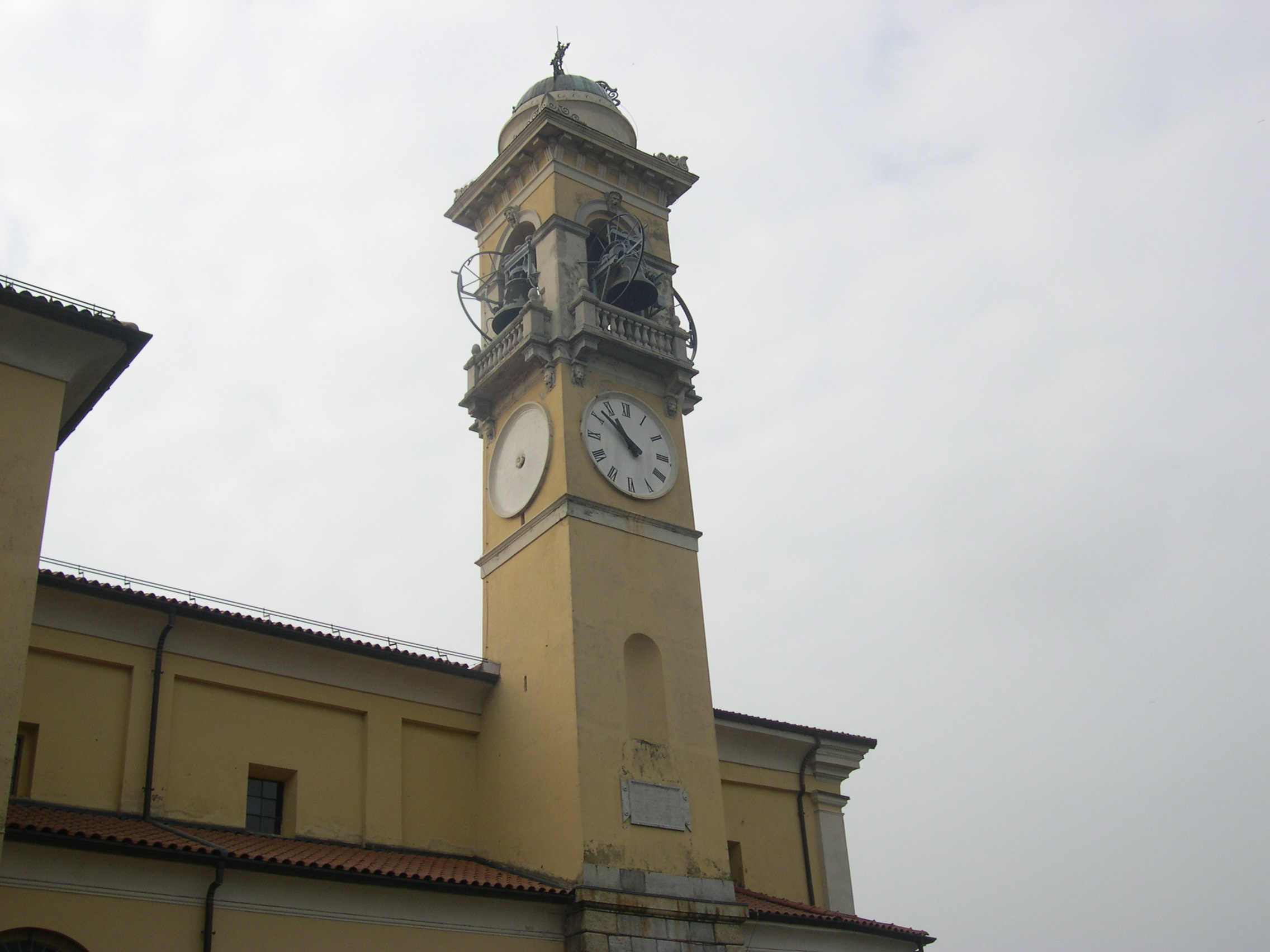

- Location within Italy Location within Lombardy
- Coordinates: 45°49′N 8°53′E
- Country: Italy
- Region: Lombardy
- Province: Province of Varese (VA)
- Frazioni: Gaggiolo, Ligurno

Area
  - Total: 9.1 km^{2} (3.5 sq mi)
- Elevation: 404 m (1,325 ft)

Population (December 2004)
  - Total: 4,409
  - Density: 480/km^{2} (1,300/sq mi)
- Time zone: UTC+1 (CET)
  - Summer (DST): UTC+2 (CEST)
- Postal code: 21050
- Dialing code: 0332
- Website: Official website

Cantello is a comune (municipality) in the Province of Varese in the Italian region Lombardy, located about 45 km (28 miles) northwest of Milan and about 4 km (2 miles) east of Varese, on the border with Switzerland. On 31 December 2004, it had a population of 4,409 and an area of 9.1 km^{2} (3.5 square miles).

The municipality of Cantello contains the frazioni (subdivisions, mainly villages and hamlets) Gaggiolo and Ligurno.

The town was called Cazzone until 1895. Its inhabitants were not aware of vulgarity before the Unification of Italy but, after that, vulgarism arrived from other Italian areas, and that name had to be changed.

Cantello borders the following municipalities: Arcisate, Cagno, Clivio, Malnate, Rodero, Stabio (Switzerland), Varese, Viggiù.

== Demographic evolution ==
Historical population

Year	Pop.	±%
1861	1,879	—
1871	2,018	+7.4%
1881	2,212	+9.6%
1901	2,476	+11.9%
1911	2,750	+11.1%

Year	Pop.	±%
1921	2,725	−0.9%
1931	2,523	−7.4%
1936	2,475	−1.9%
1951	2,692	+8.8%
1961	3,331	+23.7%

Year	Pop.	±%
1971	4,001	+20.1%
1981	3,954	−1.2%
1991	3,932	−0.6%
2001	4,244	+7.9%

Source: Data from ISTAT
