= Cagno =

Cagno Cagn (Lombard)
- Comune
- Comune di Cagno
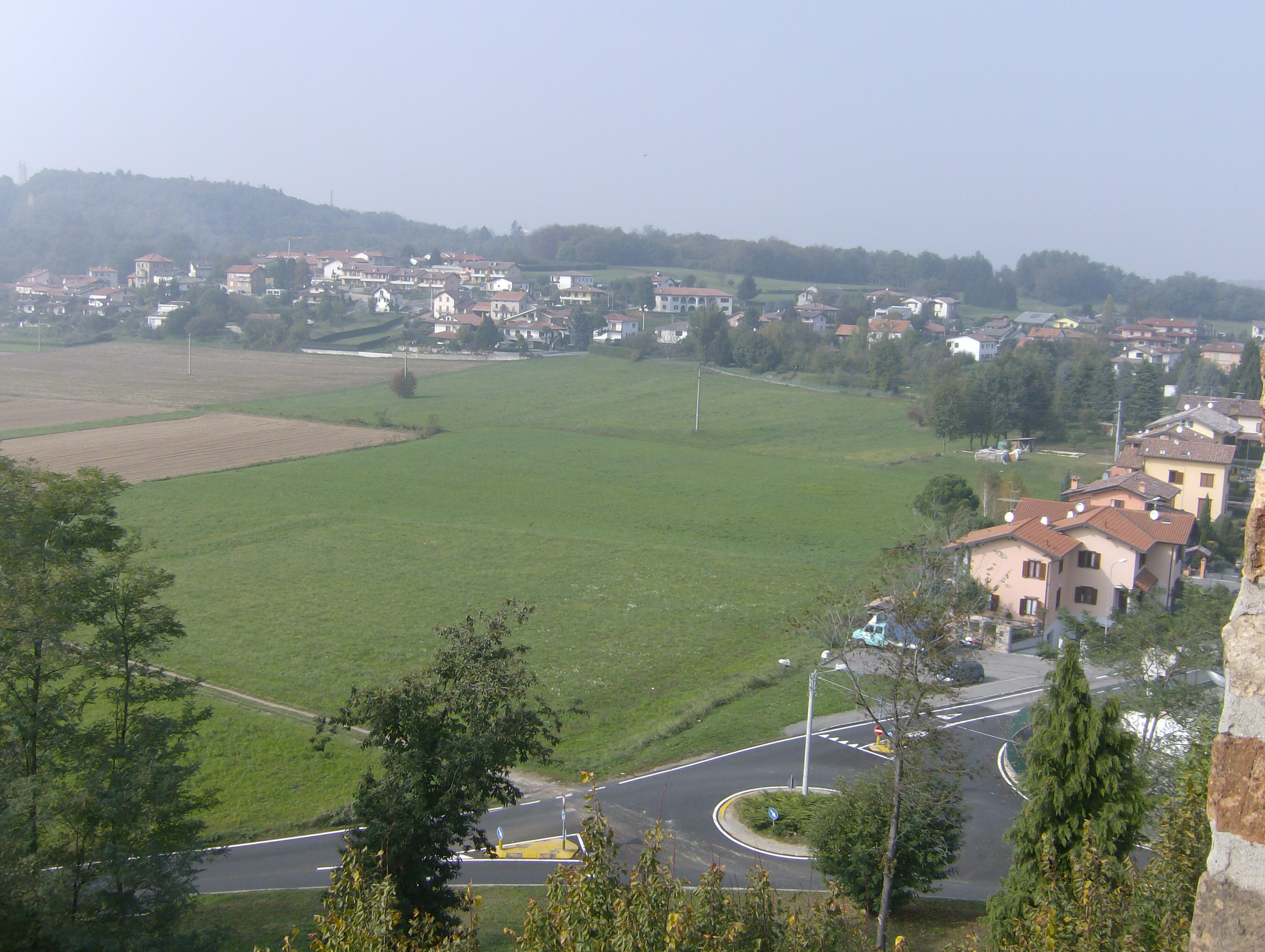

- Location within Italy Location within Lombardy
- Coordinates: 45°49′N 8°55′E
- Country: Italy
- Region: Lombardy
- Province: Como (CO)
- Frazioni: Brughiera, Rocca

Government
  - Mayor: Claudio Ronchini

Area
  - Total: 3.53 km^{2} (1.36 sq mi)
- Elevation: 405 m (1,329 ft)

Population (31 March 2017)
  - Total: 2,035
  - Density: 576/km^{2} (1,490/sq mi)
- Demonym: Cagnesi
- Time zone: UTC+1 (CET)
  - Summer (DST): UTC+2 (CEST)
- Postal code: 22070
- Dialing code: 031
- Website: Official website

Cagno (Comasco: Cagn [ˈkaɲ]) is a comune (municipality) in the Province of Como in the Italian region Lombardy, located about 45 kilometres (28 mi) northwest of Milan and about 13 kilometres (8 mi) west of Como.

Cagno borders the following municipalities: Albiolo, Cantello, Malnate, Rodero, Solbiate, Valmorea.
