= Anovelo da Imbonate =

Italian painter

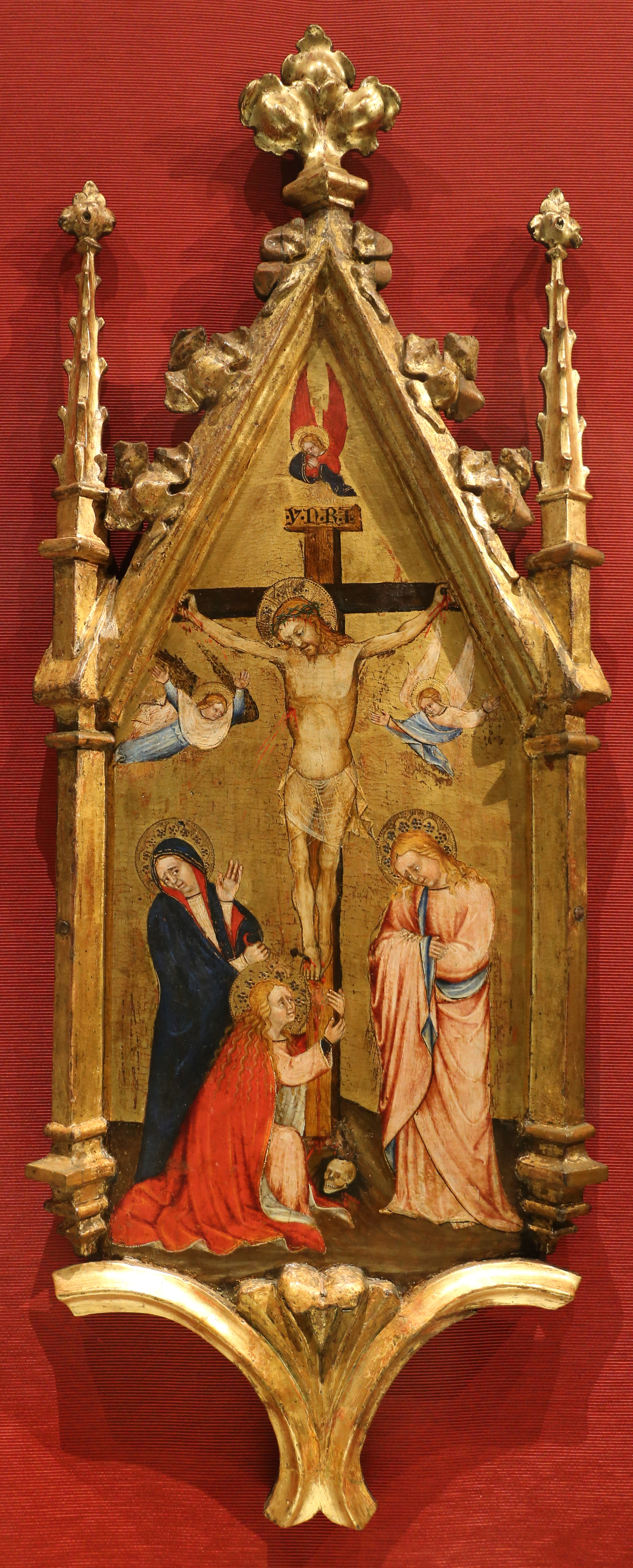

Anovelo da Imbonate was an Italian painter and manuscript illuminator of the 14th and 15th century, active in a Gothic style in Milan.

Little is known about his biography. He was likely born near Como, Italy. He signed the illuminated Messale dell'Incoronazione (Coronation Missal, circa 1395) found in the Basilica of San Ambrogio belonging to Gian Galeazzo Visconti. A second work is the Messale di Santa Tecla (1402). Among other influential illuminators of his age, whose works may have been seen by Anovelo are those of Giovannino de' Grassi and Giovanni di Benedetto da Como.

Frescoes in the Oratorio di Santo Stefano, Lentate sul Seveso are attributed to Anovelo.

== Gallery ==
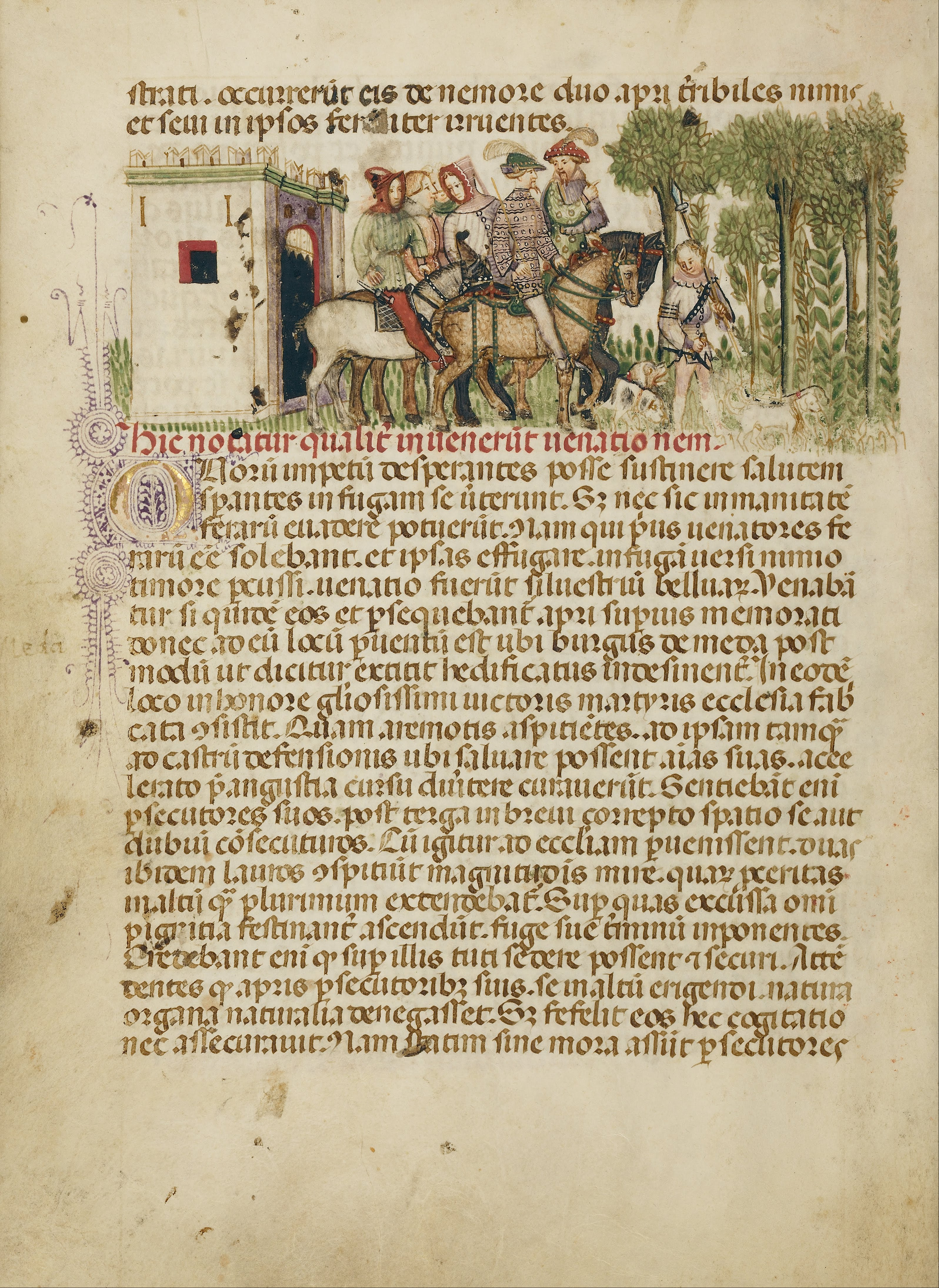
Aimo and Vermondo Riding Out to the Hunt (about 1400)

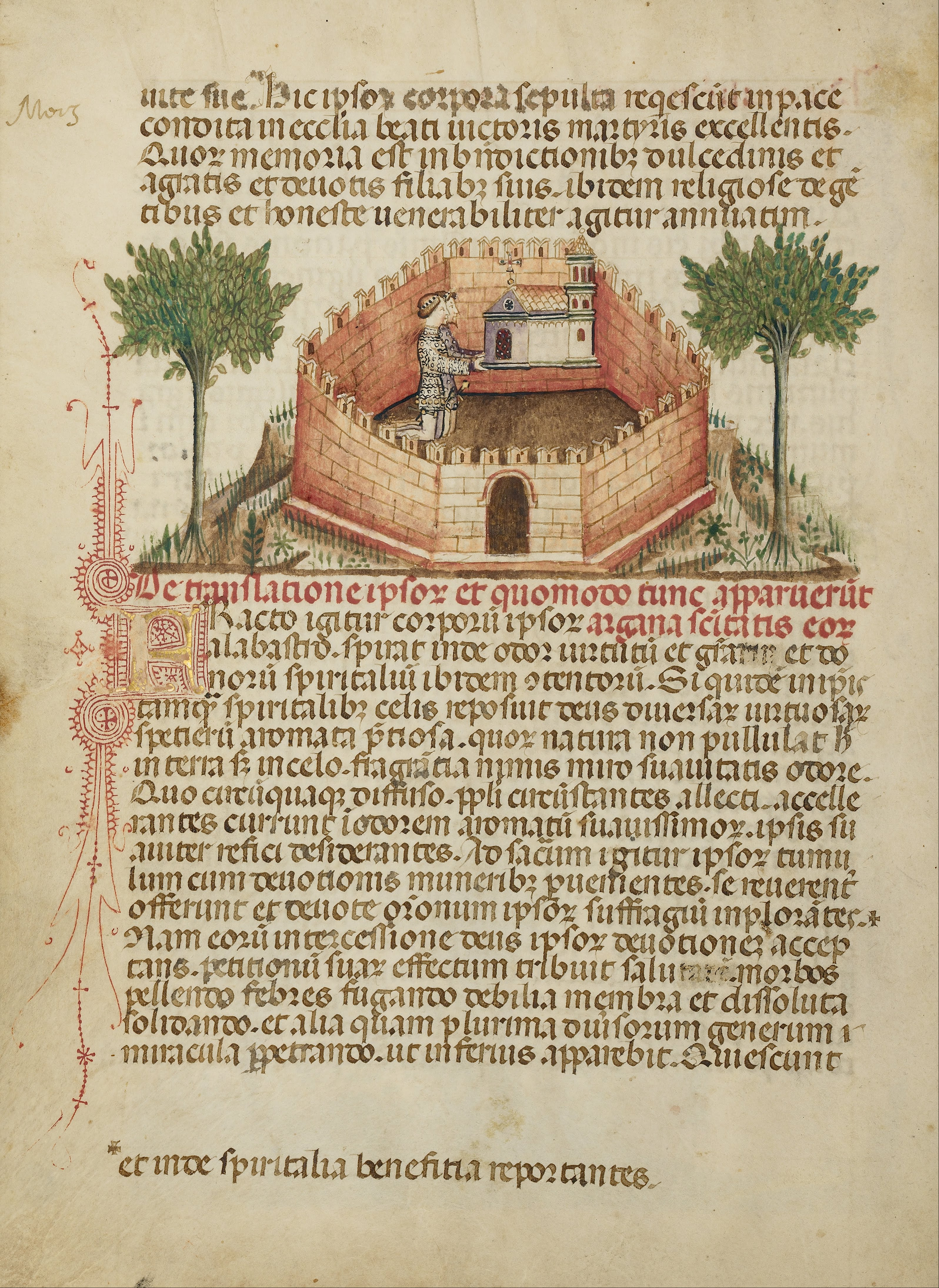
Aimo and Vermondo Holding up the Church of Saint Victor

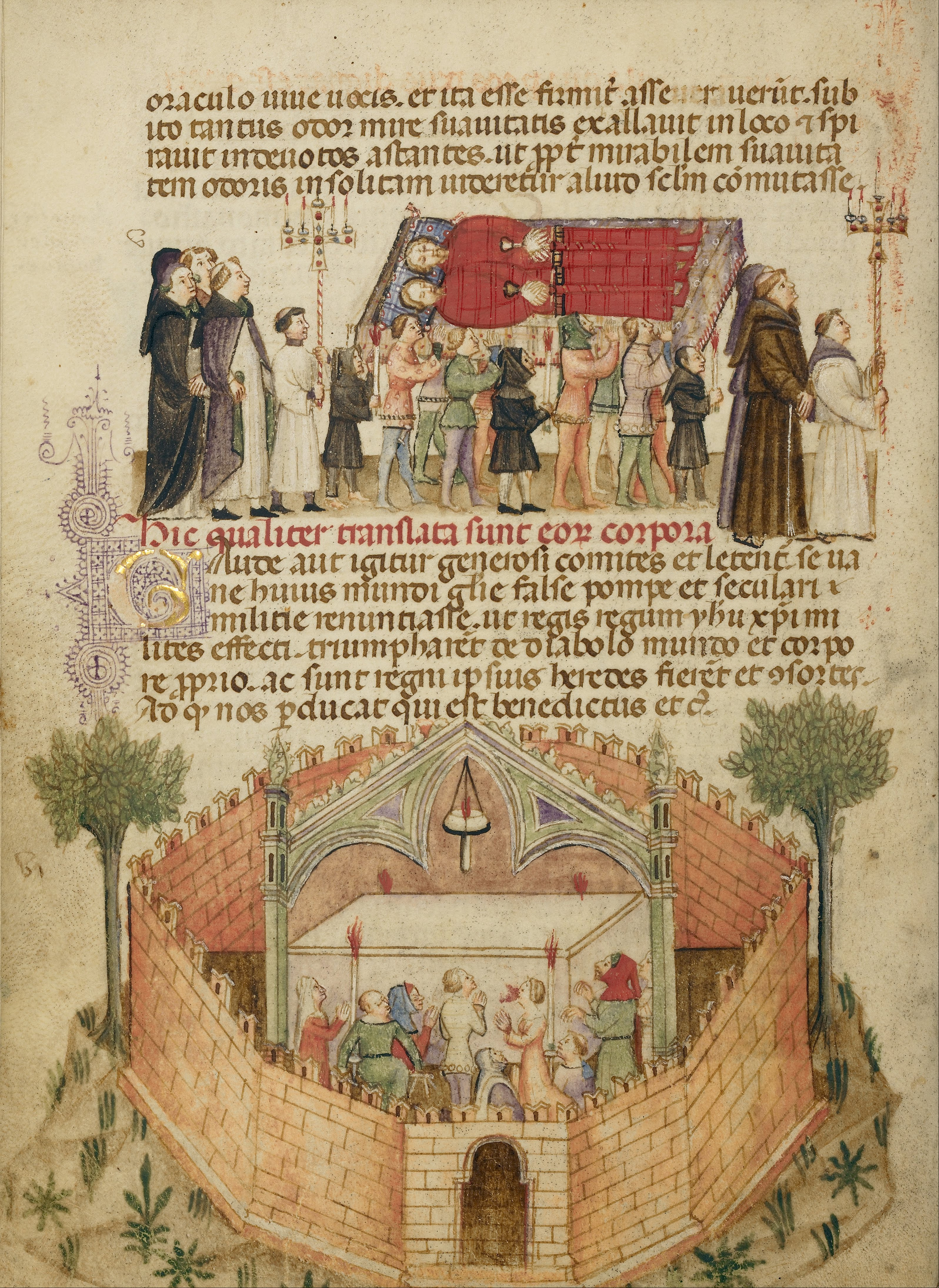
The Translation of the Bodies of Aimo and Vermondo; The People of Milan Praying at the Altar Where Aimo and Vermondo are Buried
