= Misinto =

Misinto Mediosente
- Comune
- Comune di Misinto
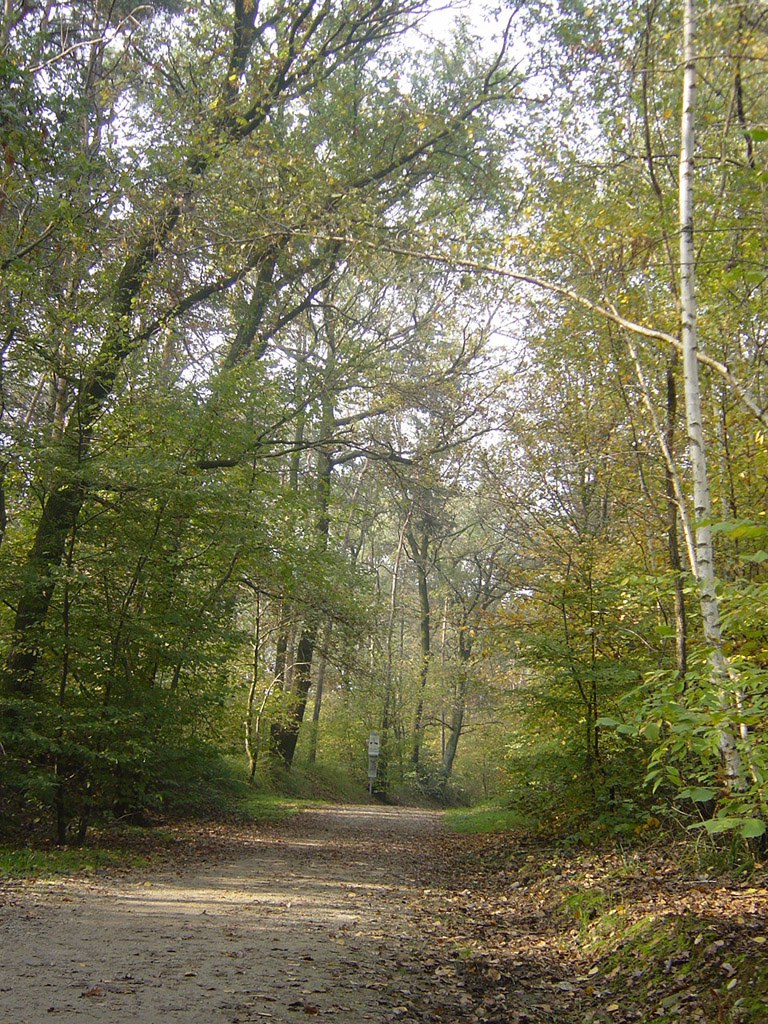

- Coat of arms

- Location within Italy Location within Lombardy
- Coordinates: 45°40′N 9°5′E
- Country: Italy
- Region: Lombardy
- Province: Monza and Brianza (MB)
- Frazioni: Cascina Nuova, Cascina Sant'Andrea

Government
  - Mayor: Matteo Piuri; deputy mayor is Monica Caspani (Nuovi Orizzonti Misinto)

Area
  - Total: 5.1 km^{2} (2.0 sq mi)
- Elevation: 252 m (827 ft)

Population (2019)
  - Total: 5 654
  - Density: 0.98/km^{2} (2.5/sq mi)
- Demonym: misintesi
- Time zone: UTC+1 (CET)
  - Summer (DST): UTC+2 (CEST)
- Postal code: 20826
- Dialing code: 02
- Patron saint: Siro
- Saint day: 9 December
- Website: Official website

Misinto is a comune (municipality) in the Province of Monza and Brianza in the Italian region Lombardy, located about 25 kilometres (16 mi) northwest of Milan.

Misinto borders the following municipalities: Lentate sul Seveso, Lazzate, Rovellasca, Rovello Porro, Cogliate.

== Geography of the territory ==
Located in the northern part of the Groane Park, a forest of regional importance that extends between many municipalities in the area, Misinto is located in the highest part of the Po Valley, halfway between Milan and Como. For major services we generally turn to Saronno, a municipality in the province of Varese.

The closest river is the Seveso which passes through Lentate and the Lura stream which flows through Rovellasca. The town is mainly flat, with the center slightly raised. It is surrounded by cultivated fields to the south and west, while to the east it communicates with the Groane Park. To the north it borders the municipality of Lazzate.

Misinto is, as the crow flies, 17 km from Monza, approximately 24 km from Milan and 16 km from Como.

== History ==
Autonomous municipality since the Middle Ages, during the Napoleonic reign it was briefly aggregated to Lazzate and then to Lentate. With the unification of Italy the parties were reversed, because in 1869 it was Misinto who annexed Lazzate, only to lose it in 1905.

The municipal coat of arms was granted by royal decree of 20 December 1932.

«Blue to the pine plant, placed on arid ground, juxtaposed by the natural heather plant; with silver head, to the black eagle, crowned with the field. Commune exterior ornaments.

The pine and the heather, typical plants of the heath, represent the partly wooded and partly barren landscape of the territory of the Municipality of Misinto. The black eagle in the silver head is taken from the coat of arms of the noble Milanese family of Carcassola [6], which in 1538 had become the owner of the fiefdom of the parish church of Seveso, of which Misinto was part at that time.

The banner is a white cloth with the municipality's coat of arms in the centre.

== Places of interest ==
=== Monuments ===
==== Monument to the fallen soldiers of World War I. ====
The monument is located inside the Parco della Rimembranza, situated along Via dei Caduti, the street that connects the center to the oratory dedicated to St. Dominic Savio.

On the plaque, placed under the painting of the Pietà by Mauro Conconi, is written.

“Alla pietà dei buoni terrieri questa riproduzione di opera egregia e lodata del rimpianto pittore Mauro Conconi il nipote Alessandro Riva, Sindaco del Comune, offeriva nel 1863 raccomandando la cara e preziosa memoria dei propri defunti, che qui riposano in pace”

=== Religious Buildings ===
In Centro a Misinto is the parish church San Siro, built in the first half of the 17th century and later enlarged in the last years of the 19th century with the addition of the crypt (which houses a valuable reliquary), is flanked by a Romanesque-style bell tower.

In the hamlet of Cascina Nuova is the new church San Bernardo, dating from 1927; the old church is a few meters from the parish.

=== Historic Villas ===
==== Maggi Palace ====
It took this name when, on December 3, 1810, Ermenegildo Vimercati ceded all his property, land and buildings, to Carlo Ambrogio Maggi. About the origins of the palace, probably, in the fourteenth and fifteenth centuries (perhaps originally fortified), there was a transfer of ownership from a previous lineage to that of the Vimercati; it is certain, however, that the primitive core of the building dates back a few centuries earlier. The Maggi did not make any major changes, such as to profoundly alter the floor plan of the palace; the wall structure and exterior appearance must not have been dissimilar to how they appear today. They added perhaps a few posthumous elements (such as the interior veranda) and completed the decoration of other interior rooms.

Now the palace is home to the town hall and municipal library.

==== Villa Riva ====
It was the Solaro family, to be considered the first owner of the property. The family's stay in Misinto, in fact is documented as far back as the 16th century by parish registers. In a document from 1691 there is a description of the coherences of their properties in the territory of Misinto, divided into several tables. In 1793, when the last Solaro heir Don G. Battista Solari died, the widow Gozzoni, finding herself alone and without heirs, passed the property to Antonia Francesconi, wife of Zaccaria Riva. The passing must have occurred in the very early years of the 19th century.

In 1947 villa and garden were purchased by the Lanzani family of Seveso.

== Anthropogenic geography ==
In addition to the capital, there are two hamlets.

New farmhouse It is a fraction of about 800 inhabitants located between the municipalities of Misinto, Cogliate and Rovellasca. Cascina Nuova has been a parish in its own right since 1925, although administratively it depends for 2/3 on the municipality of Misinto and for 1/3 on the municipality of Cogliate.

Cascina Sant'Andrea It is a locality in the south-east of the town, half immersed in the Parco delle Groane, home to some craft businesses and some families, for a total of thirty residents.

== Economy ==
The economic fabric of the country is lively, as in the rest of the district and is mainly characterized by small and medium-sized enterprises, active above all in the furniture sector.

== Administration ==
The mayor of Misinto is Matteo Piuri, elected on 26 May 2019 and candidate on the centre-right civic list.

== Sports ==
=== Soccer ===
Cm 2004 Amateur Sports Association known as Calcio Misinto is the only team in the municipality.

=== Motorcycle club ===
Moto Club Misinto, dedicated to Angelo Bergamonti.[8]

=== Cycling ===
In October, the municipality hosts the "Trofeo Comune di Misinto" organized by G.S. Misintese Asd, this competition is part of the Monza and Brianza provincial championship. Traditionally it takes place on the Sunday morning of the week containing the village festival.

=== Ski ===
In Misinto there is the amateur sports activity Sci club I Corvi.

=== Volleyball, karate and other sports ===
The municipality makes the gymnasium of the G. Marconi elementary school available to private companies. The three clubs that historically use the gym are ASD Karate, Oeffe Volleyball Misinto Under 17 and the Misinto Dance Academy.

== Administration ==
=== Roads ===
From Misinto it is possible to easily reach Milan and Como thanks to the former Giovi state highway (SS 35), which passes through the nearby municipality of Lentate sul Seveso. The section of the state highway that connects Lentate to Cormano is called the Superstrada Milano-Meda (SP 35).

The nearest highway entrances are in Turate and Lomazzo where the Autostrada dei laghi (A9 Lainate - Como - Chiasso) passes.
