= Rovellasca =

- Comune
- Comune di Rovellasca
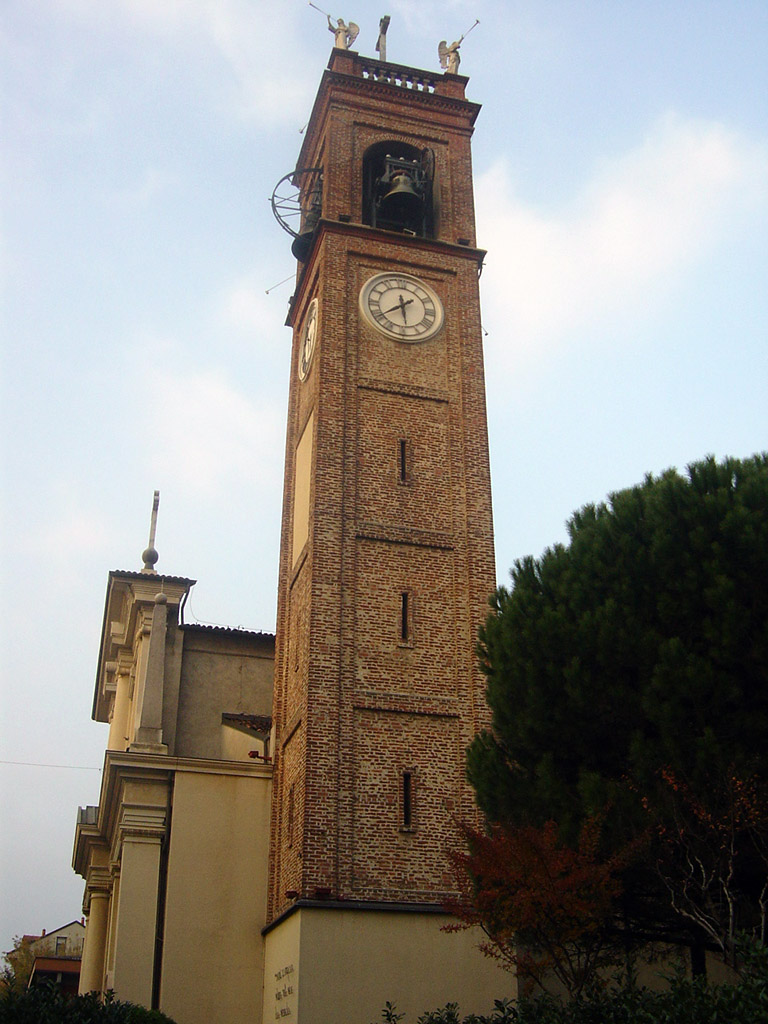

- Coat of arms

- Location within Italy Location within Lombardy
- Coordinates: 45°40′N 9°3′E
- Country: Italy
- Region: Lombardy
- Province: Como (CO)
- Frazioni: Manera

Government
  - Mayor: Sergio Zauli

Area
  - Total: 3.5 km^{2} (1.4 sq mi)
- Elevation: 244 m (801 ft)

Population (31 March 2017)
  - Total: 7,821
  - Density: 2,200/km^{2} (5,800/sq mi)
- Demonym: Rovellaschesi
- Time zone: UTC+1 (CET)
  - Summer (DST): UTC+2 (CEST)
- Postal code: 22069
- Dialing code: 02
- Website: Official website

Rovellasca is a comune (municipality) in the Province of Como in the Italian region Lombardy, located about 25 kilometres (16 mi) northwest of Milan and about 15 kilometres (9 mi) south of Como.

Rovellasca borders the following municipalities: Bregnano, Lazzate, Lomazzo, Misinto, Rovello Porro.

Physician and zoologist Giovanni Battista Grassi was born in Rovellasca.
