= Cogliate =

Cogliate San Dalmazzi (Lombard)
- Comune
- Comune di Cogliate
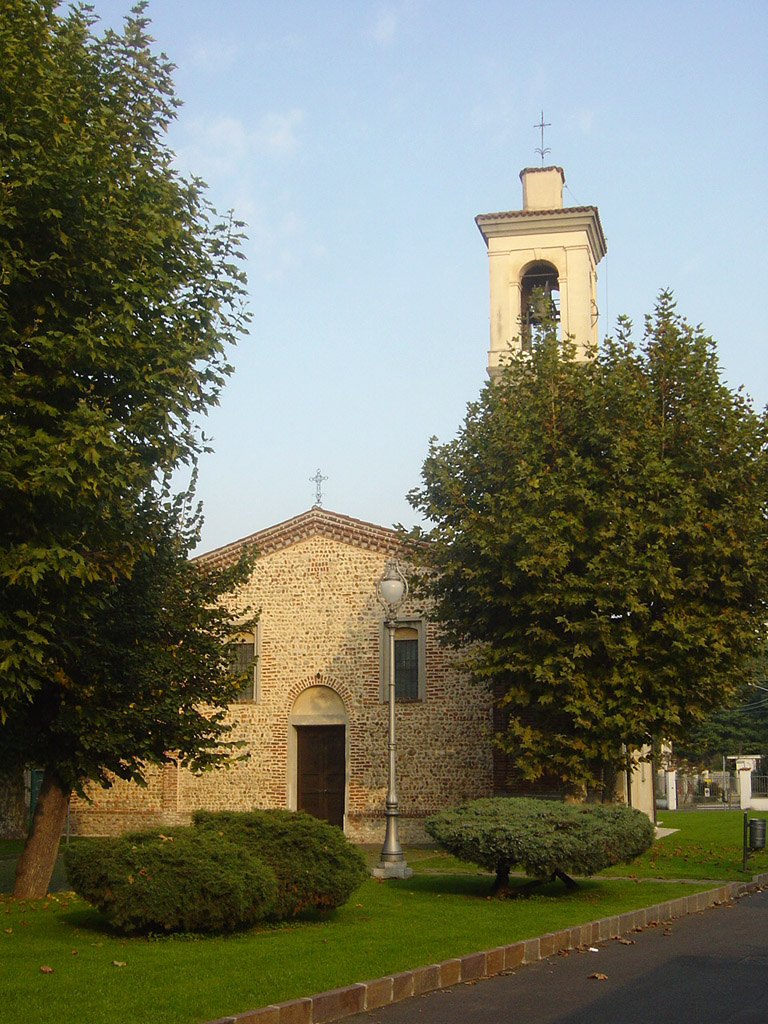
- Church of St. Cosmas and Damian

- Location within Italy Location within Lombardy
- Coordinates: 45°38′N 9°5′E
- Country: Italy
- Region: Lombardy
- Province: Monza and Brianza (MB)
- Frazioni: Cascina Nuova, San Damiano, Villaggio Fiori

Government
  - Mayor: Andrea Basilico

Area
  - Total: 6.96 km^{2} (2.69 sq mi)
- Elevation: 236 m (774 ft)

Population (30 November 2017)
  - Total: 8,514
  - Density: 1,220/km^{2} (3,170/sq mi)
- Demonym: Cogliatesi
- Time zone: UTC+1 (CET)
  - Summer (DST): UTC+2 (CEST)
- Postal code: 20815
- Dialing code: 02
- Patron saint: St. Dalmatius
- Saint day: December 5
- Website: Official website

Cogliate (Italian: [koʎˈʎaːte]; Brianzoeu: San Dalmazzi [sã dalˈmatsi]) is a comune (municipality) in the Province of Monza and Brianza in the Italian region Lombardy, located 29 kilometres (18 mi) northwest of Milan.

Cogliate borders the following municipalities: Lentate sul Seveso, Rovello Porro, Misinto, Barlassina, Seveso, Saronno, Cesano Maderno, Ceriano Laghetto.

== Sports ==
The football team Cogliatese, which plays in the Seconda Categoria, is based in Cogliate.
