= Oratory of Mocchirolo =

Church building in Lentate sul Seveso, Italy

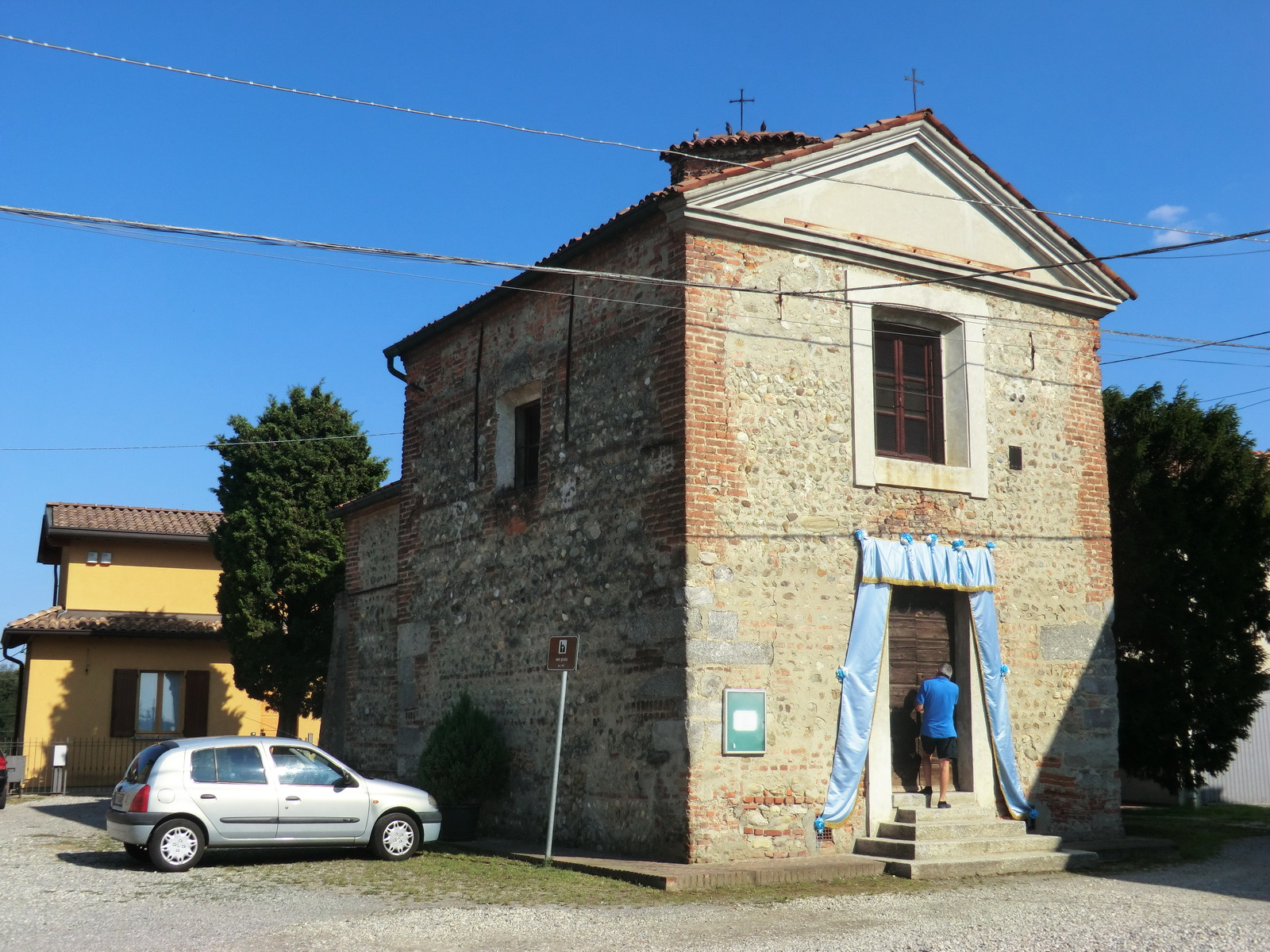
- Façade of the Oratory.

Religion
- Affiliation: Roman Catholic
- Province: Monza and Brianza
- Ecclesiastical or organisational status: National monument

Location
- Location: Lentate sul Seveso, Italy
- Interactive map of Oratory of Mocchirolo
- Coordinates: 45.678402°N 9.131868°E

Architecture
- Type: Oratory
- Style: Romanesque
- Completed: 1377

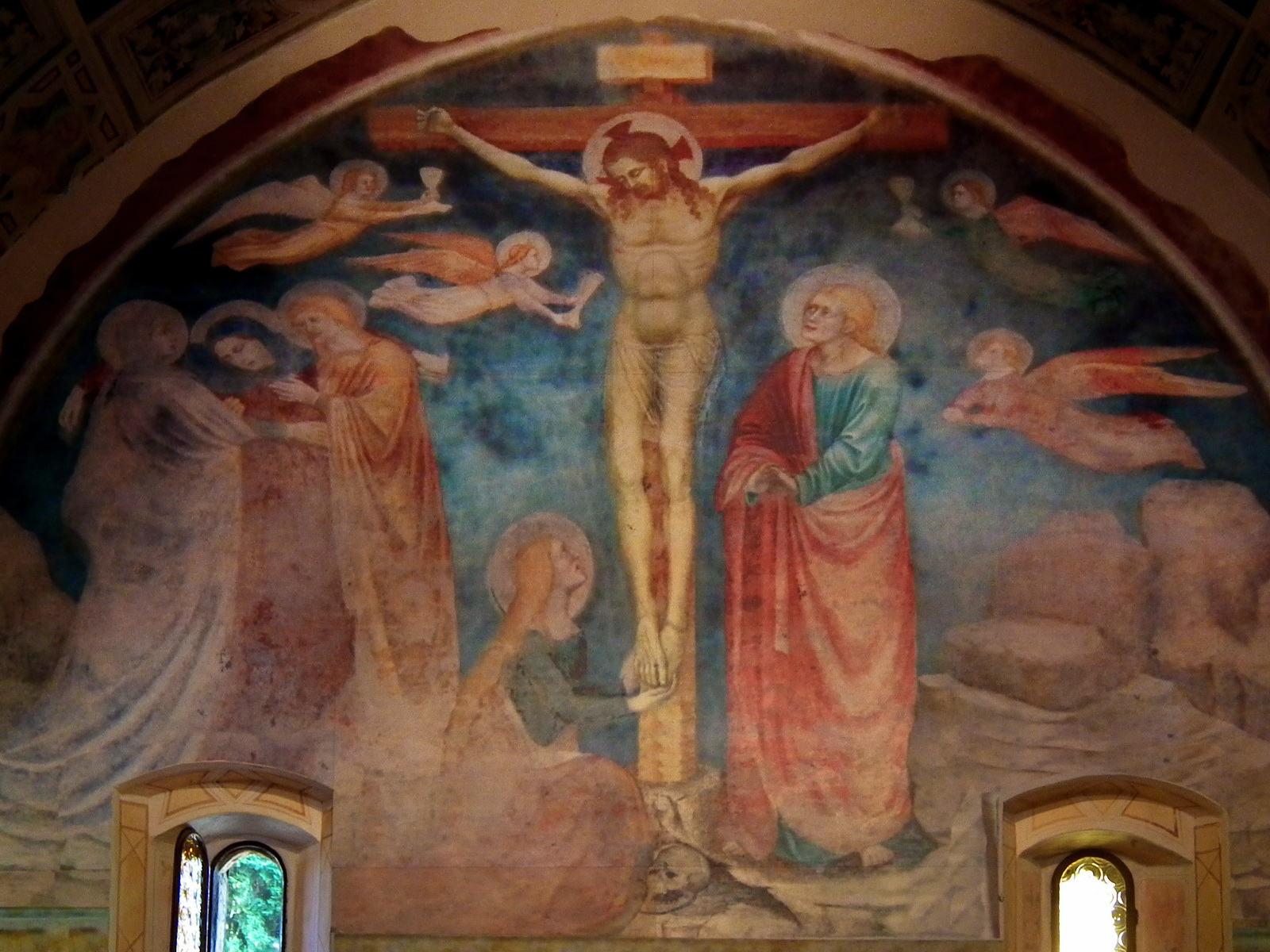
The reproduction of the frescos in the apse.

The Oratory of Saint Stephen (Italian: Oratorio di Mocchirolo) is a Roman Catholic oratory in Mocchirolo in the town of Lentate sul Seveso, part of the Province of Monza and Brianza, Lombardy, northern Italy.

The interior walls of the church once contained frescos that were removed and transferred to be housed the Pinacoteca di Brera in Milan. The frescos currently appear in apse are the reproduction of the original.
