= San Lorenzo Martire, Lazzate =

Roman Catholic church in Lazzate, Italy

Coordinates: 45°40′18″N 9°05′09″E

San Lorenzo Martire is a Neoclassic-style Roman Catholic parish church in Lazzate, province of Monza and Brianza, region of Lombardy, Italy.

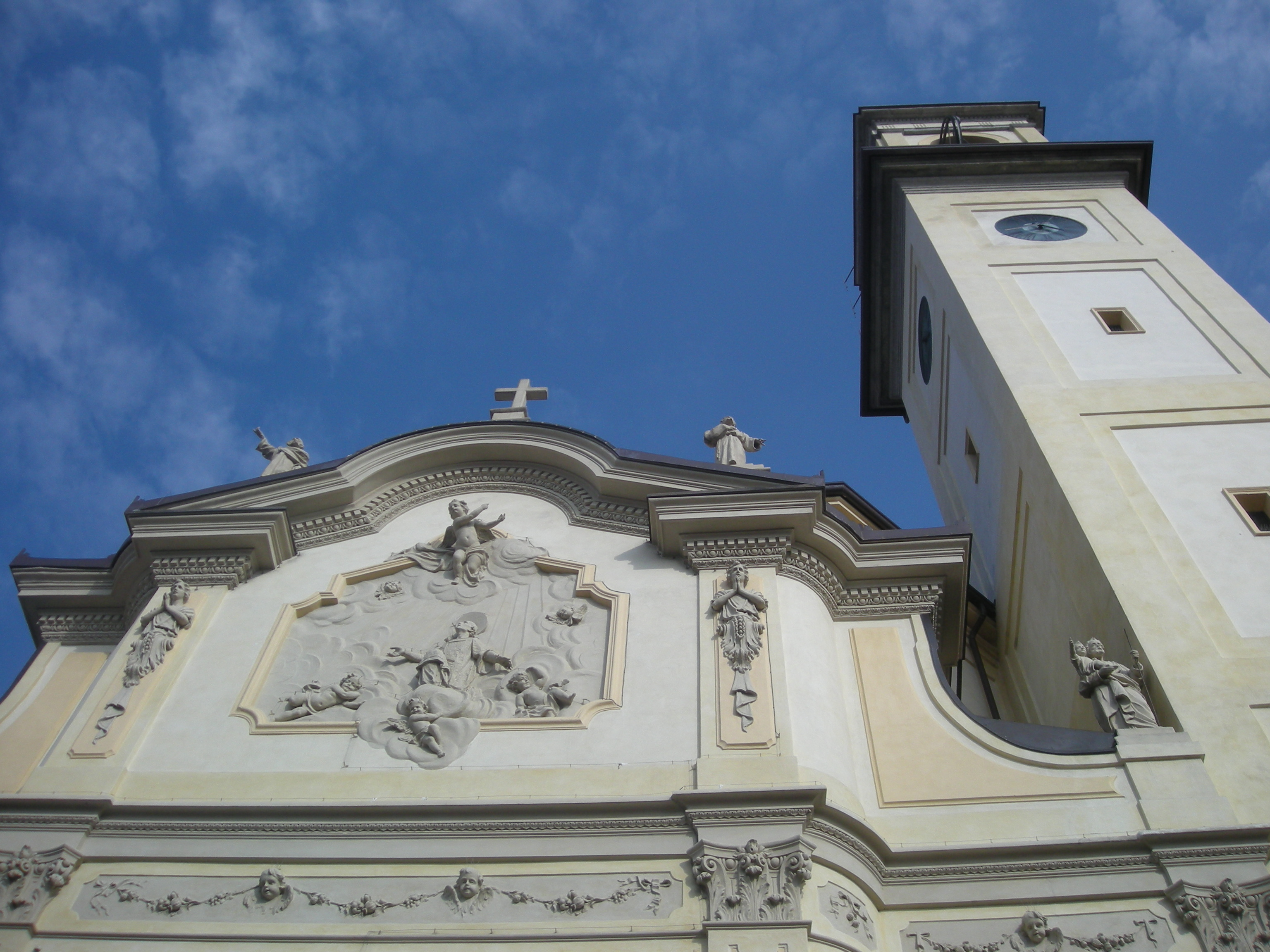
Facade with bas relief and belltower.

== History ==
The church was erected in 1758. The center of the façade has a bas-relief depicting the Glory of St Lawrence.
