= Lentate sul Seveso =

- Comune
- Comune di Lentate sul Seveso
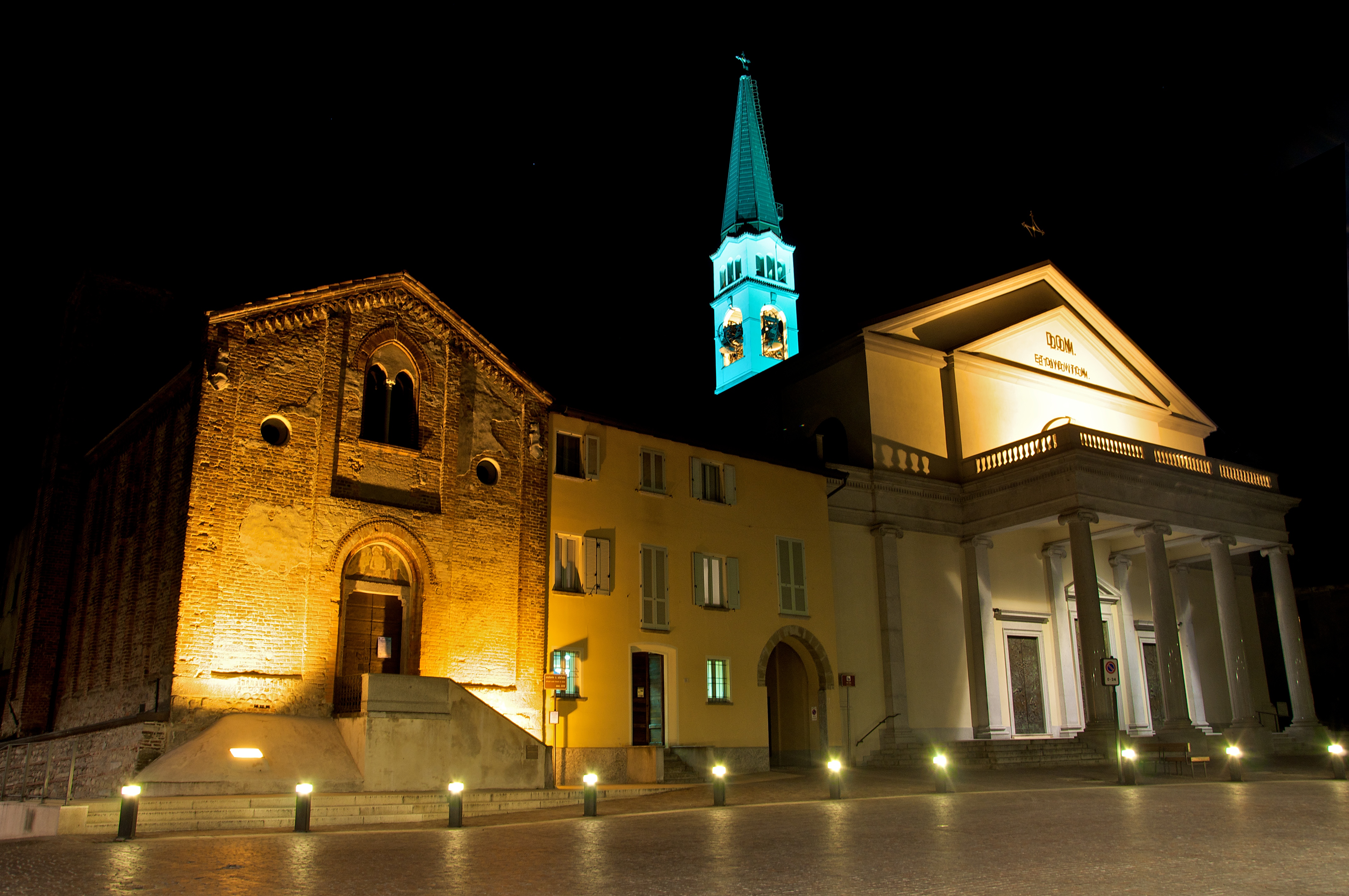
- Church of San Vito Martire and on the left, the medioeval St. Stephen's Oratory

- Coat of arms

- Location within Italy Location within Lombardy
- Coordinates: 45°41′N 9°7′E
- Country: Italy
- Region: Lombardy
- Province: Monza and Brianza (MB)
- Frazioni: Birago, Camnago, Cimnago, Copreno, Lentate Centro

Government
  - Mayor: Laura Ferrari

Area
  - Total: 14.0 km^{2} (5.4 sq mi)
- Elevation: 250 m (820 ft)

Population (31 March 2018)
  - Total: 15,912
  - Density: 1,140/km^{2} (2,940/sq mi)
- Demonym: Lentatesi
- Time zone: UTC+1 (CET)
  - Summer (DST): UTC+2 (CEST)
- Postal code: 20823
- Dialing code: 0362
- Patron saint: St. Vitus
- Saint day: 14 October
- Website: Official website

Lentate sul Seveso is a comune (municipality) in the Province of Monza and Brianza in the Italian region Lombardy, located about 25 kilometres (16 mi) north of Milan.

Lentate sul Seveso borders the following municipalities: Mariano Comense, Carimate, Cermenate, Novedrate, Cabiate, Meda, Lazzate, Misinto, Barlassina, Cogliate. Sights include the Oratories of Mocchirolo and Santo Stefano, as well as the Villa Valdettaro. The Oratory of Santo Stefano contains a cycle of 14th century frescoes.

Lentate is served by the Camnago-Lentate railway station.

== Sport ==
The football club of Lentate Sul Seveso is Lentatese, playing in Eccellenza
