= Oratory of Santo Stefano, Lentate sul Seveso =

Church building in Lentate sul Seveso, Italy

Oratory of Saint Stephen (Oratorio di Santo Stefano)
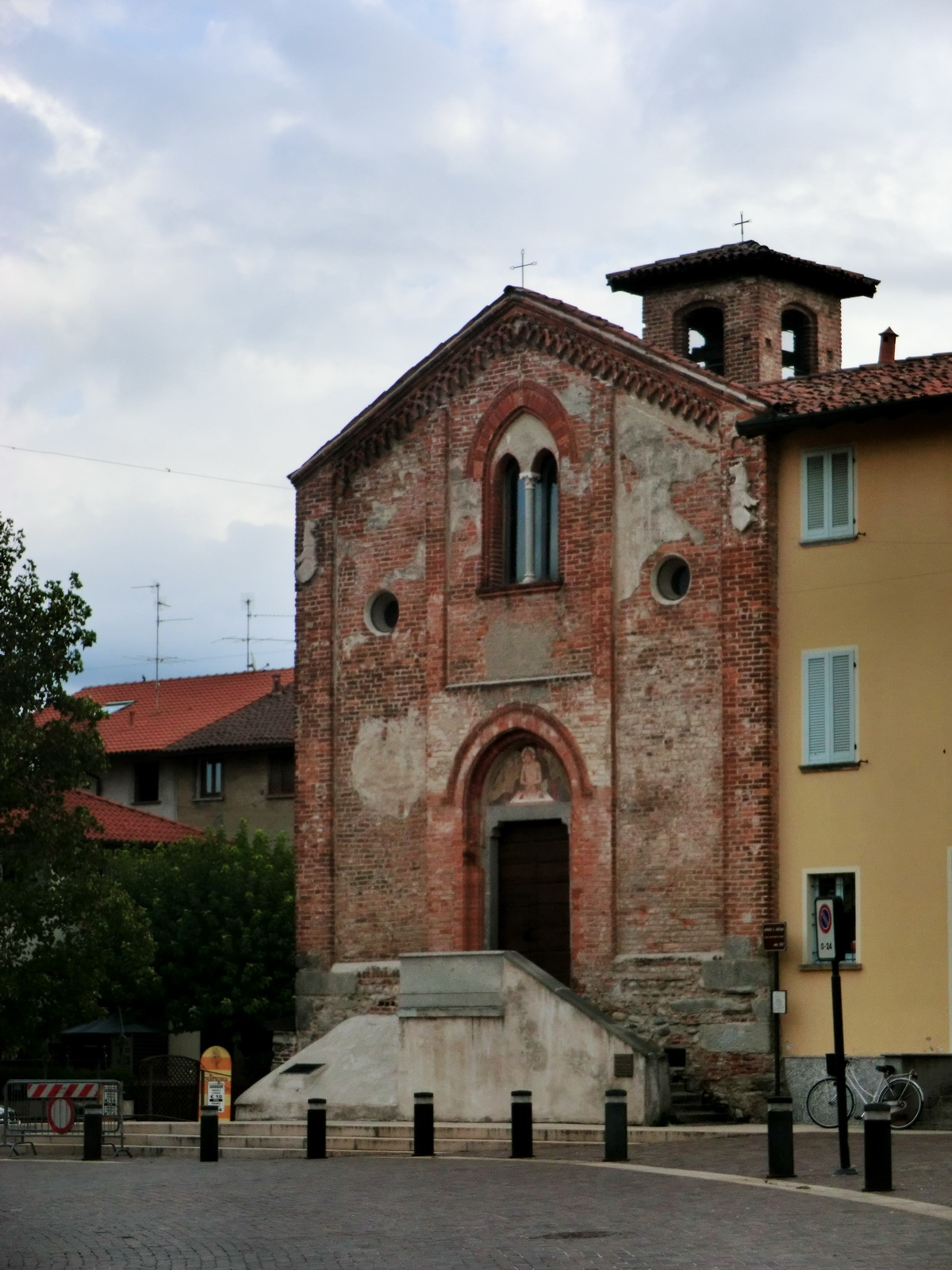
- Façade of the Oratory.

Religion
- Affiliation: Roman Catholic
- Province: Monza and Brianza
- Ecclesiastical or organisational status: National monument

Location
- Location: Lentate sul Seveso, Italy
- Interactive map of Oratory of Saint Stephen (Oratorio di Santo Stefano)
- Coordinates: 45.678459°N 9.122125°E

Architecture
- Type: Church
- Style: Romanesque

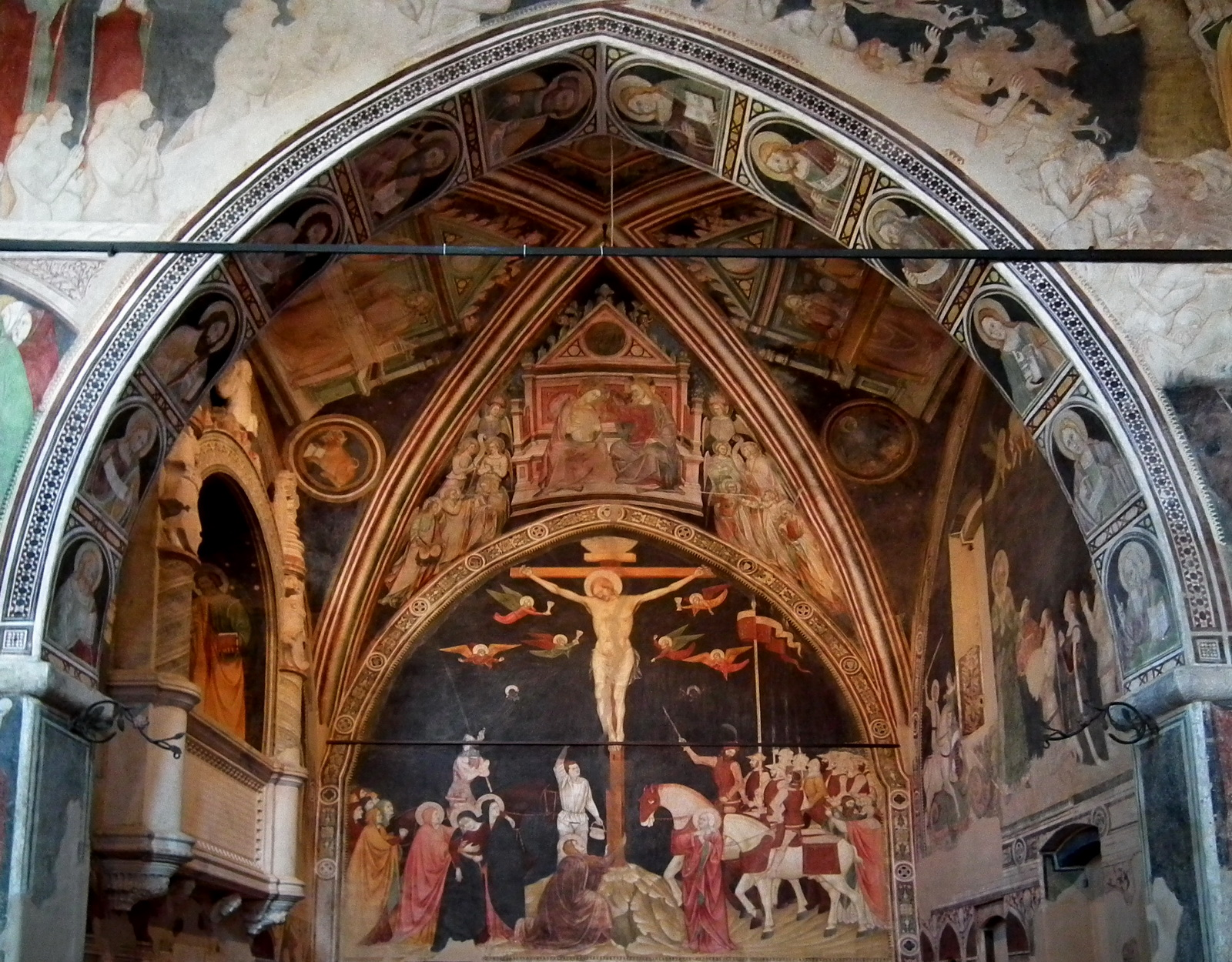
Frescos around the apse

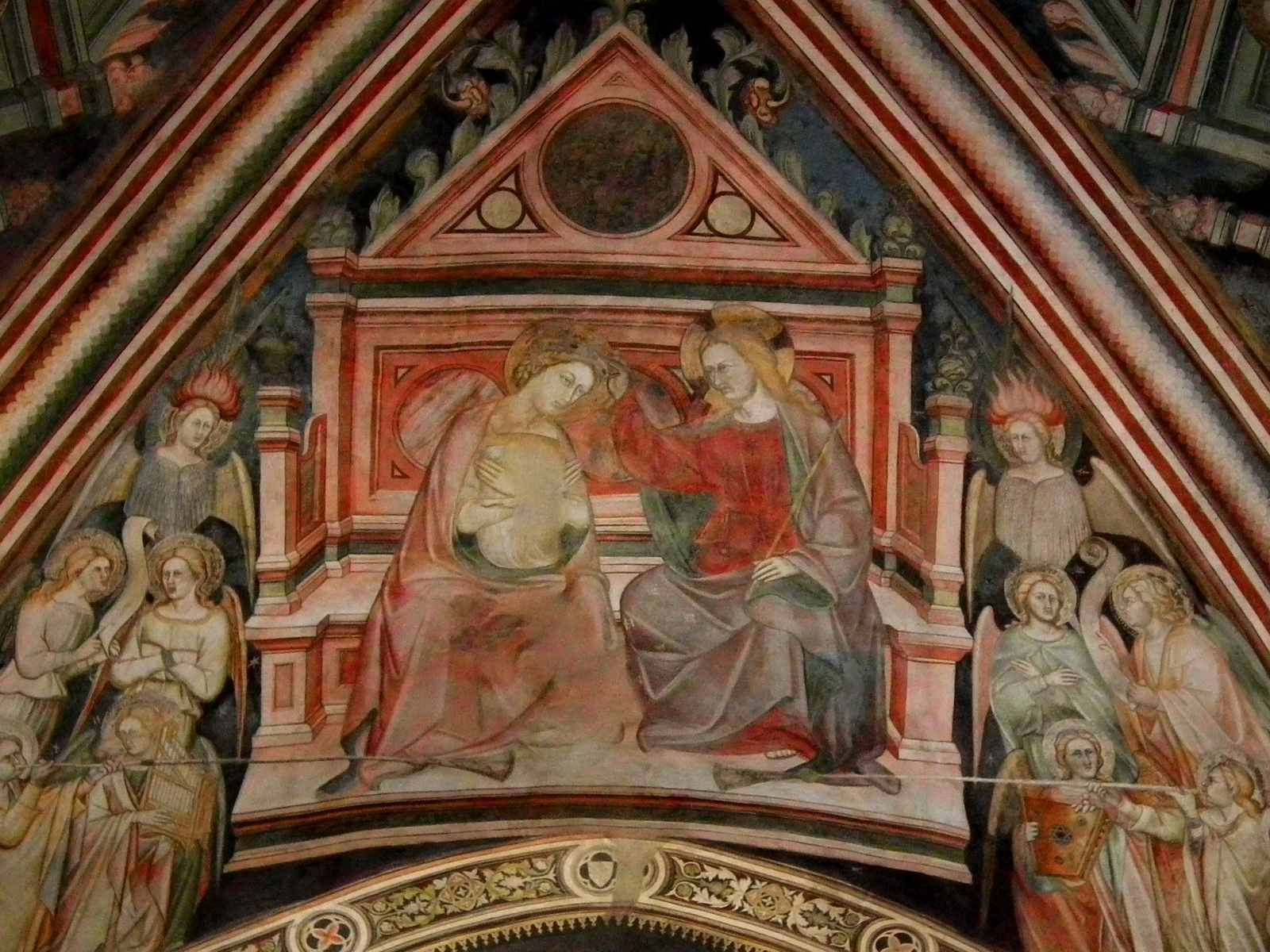
Christ crowned Madonna

Oratory of Saint Stephen (Italian: Oratorio di Santo Stefano is a Roman Catholic oratory in the town of Lentate sul Seveso, in the Province of Monza and Brianza and the region of Lombardy, Italy.

== History ==
The plain Gothic-style brick two-story structure is located in the town center, next to the parish church of San Vito Martire. Construction took place in 1369, commissioned by Stefano Porro, an ambassador to the court of Bernabò and Galeazzo Visconti, who was made a palatine count by the Holy Roman Emperor Charles IV in 1368. The outside appears dilapidated. The entrance to the single nave is through a stairwell dipping below the right of the façade, above is a mullioned window with an ogival window frame. Despite restoration in the 1930s and 1960s, the frescoes are threatened by humidity.

== Interior Decoration ==
The interior walls of the church contain frescos by Anovelo da Imbonate who also painted the image above the front portal. Imbonate is a painter of the school of Giovanni da Milano who was a direct disciple of Giotto. The three walls around the oratory is covered with the cycle of frescoes of the life of Saint Stephen.

Among other frescoes is the work by an anonymous painter called the "Maestro di Lentate". This is representative of a late-Gothic art school called the International Gothic style.
