= Rovello Porro =

- Comune
- Comune di Rovello Porro
- Location within Italy Location within Lombardy
- Coordinates: 45°39′N 9°2′E
- Country: Italy
- Region: Lombardy
- Province: Province of Como (CO)

Area
  - Total: 5.6 km^{2} (2.2 sq mi)
- Elevation: 240 m (790 ft)

Population (Dec. 2004)
  - Total: 5,797
  - Density: 1,000/km^{2} (2,700/sq mi)
- Demonym: Rovellesi
- Time zone: UTC+1 (CET)
  - Summer (DST): UTC+2 (CEST)
- Postal code: 22070
- Dialing code: 02
- Website: Official website

Rovello Porro (Comasco: Rovell [ruˈʋɛl]) is a comune (municipality) in the Province of Como in the Italian region of Lombardy, located about 25 kilometres (16 mi) northwest of Milan and about 20 kilometres (12 mi) south of Como. As of 31 December 2004, it had a population of 5,797 and an area of 5.6 square kilometres (2.2 mi^{2}).

Rovello Porro borders the following municipalities: Cogliate, Gerenzano, Lomazzo, Misinto, Rovellasca, Saronno, Turate.

== Demographic evolution ==
Historical population

Year	Pop.	±%
1861	1,591	—
1871	1,680	+5.6%
1881	1,789	+6.5%
1901	2,290	+28.0%
1911	2,635	+15.1%

Year	Pop.	±%
1921	2,859	+8.5%
1931	3,051	+6.7%
1936	3,072	+0.7%
1951	3,290	+7.1%
1961	4,012	+21.9%

Year	Pop.	±%
1971	4,558	+13.6%
1981	5,249	+15.2%
1991	5,333	+1.6%
2001	5,512	+3.4%

Source: Data from ISTAT

== Coat of arms ==
The municipal coat of arms reflects the crest of the Paganis, a family of Milanese patricians which owned several estates in Rovello and a villa that has been renovated over the centuries; its current residents are members of the Porro family. The coat of arms depicts a blindfolded Moor imprisoned during the Crusades within a fortress. The laurel branches extol the city while serving as a reminder of vast oak forests which surrounded the village until the mid-19th century.

== Early history ==
Various hypotheses have been advanced as to the meaning of the town's name. One explanation for the word "Rovello" is its derivation from the Celtic words rose (valley) and vel (fort); i.e., "valley fortress". If that interpretation is correct, it would point to a very early settlement, since groups of Celts settled in parts of northern Italy up to about 300 BCE. The area was definitely inhabited in Roman times, as confirmed by the 1977-78 discovery of some 40 tombs between Via Manzoni and Via Carducci. The tombs contained everyday objects related to daily life (mirrors, bracelets, lamps and vases, etc., as well as coins dating from the 1st century BCE up to the 1st century CE.

During the Middle Ages the chaplain of the Rovello parish was Goffredo da Bussero, sometimes known as Gotifredo, a priest from Milan credited as the author of Notitiæ Mediolani Sanctorum, completed in the late 13th century, an important source for the diocesan history of the area. From this work it appears that four chapels were originally dedicated to St. Andrew (not mentioned in later centuries); Saints Euphemia and Ursula (recorded until the 15th century); Santa Maria della Lura; and St. Peter, since the 12th century dedicated to St. Paul as well. Little or nothing is known of Rovello during the rest of the Middle Ages, except for a short-lived peace treaty signed in Rovello and Lomazzo between the Guelphs and Ghibellines, warring factions from Como and Milan.

In the countryside near Saronno was the residence of Matteo II Visconti (c. 1319–1355). In 1519 the local council of heads of families decided to entrust two local churches to the Carmelites, who occupied the Rovello convent till 1653, having pledged to celebrate a daily Mass and to teach reading and writing to local children. Early in the 17th century the monks began observing a feast day on the third Sunday in July with an annual procession and carrying a statue of the Madonna. In October 1652 Pope Innocent X decided to suppress all smaller monasteries, and Archbishop Alfonso Litta closed the Rovello monastery in 1653, ceding its building and property to the parish. In 1677, however, Marquis Cesare Pagani, a leading figure in Milan's public life, received permission to erect a chapel dedicated to Santa Maria del Carmine. He donated a wooden statue of the Madonna which is still revered today.

== Later history ==
When Cesare Pagani died childless (1707) he had named as his heir his cousin Carlo Giuseppe Porro, a lawyer. Subsequently, several members of the Porro dynasty played significant roles in political, economic and cultural areas. Giovanni Pietro Porro (1773–1852) incorporated the Italian bank Cassa di Risparmio delle Provincie Lombarde in 1823 and served as the bank's president. Francesco Porro (1813–1848) was the village mayor and was a co-founder of Milan's Natural History Museum. Alessandro Porro (1814–1879) was a member of the provisional government of Milan during an uprising against the Austrian Empire. In 1926 Benito Mussolini's Gen. Carlo Porro (1854–1939) attached his family's name to the earlier town name of Rovello.

During the 19th century the Santa Maria church became a part of the parish of Appiano and was expanded twice, first from 1804 to 1808, then again in 1872–73. Between 1925 and 1929 the architect Ugo Zanchetta completely rebuilt the Carmelite monastery, and from 1935 and 1939 the parish church, which had already been rebuilt in the late 18th century, was expanded to accommodate the town's increasing population. Architect Paolo Mezzanotte presented plans for a church expansion to cost 800,000 lire, and 12 granite columns, each 8.5m in height and 1m in diameter, were purchased from the municipality after the demolition of the atrium of the Fatebenefratelli Hospital (Azienda Ospedaliera Fatebenefratelli e Oftalmico). Cardinal Alfredo Ildefonso Schuster laid the cornerstone on March 14, 1935, and consecrated the Pietro e Paolo church on September 30, 1939. The old church building remained beside the new and was not demolished until 1953, after two keystones broke and large cracks appeared in the wall, which were prohibitively expensive to repair.

Between 1928 and 1945 the painter Vanni Rossi adorned the church with a cycle of frescoes. More recently the sculptor Giorgio Galletti added bronze doors, and Emiliano Viscardi produced frescoes by the two ovals of the transept. For the reconsecration of the church in July 1995, a new marble altar and mosaics were completed by sculptor Floriano Bodini, as well as stained-glass windows depicting Saint Francis of Assisi's Canticle of the Sun. In 2002 paintings by Valentino Vago were added to the church interior.

In recent decades, construction activity has intensified in Rovello with the completion of new homes and such public works as a city hall and civic centre, elementary and middle schools, and the Opera Pia Carcano, a senior citizens housing project.

== Administration ==
In the latter part of the 16th century Rovello had between 500 and 600 people in at least 80 families living in more than 40 houses situated around the present Piazza of Porro. The majority of the population were tenant farmers and labourers, but there were also specialized artisans (tailors, carpenters, bakers) and an innkeeper.

A census conducted in 1751 listed the feudal Count Giovanni della Porta along with about 700 residents. The town had a general council of citizens, which would assemble when summoned by a bell, and a mayor and elected councillors known as the Console. Included in the Parish of Appiano, the City appears in the Indice delle pievi e comunità dello Stato di Milano (Index of churches and communities of Milan) in 1753 as still belonging to the Duchy of Milan. The feudal system ended in 1763 with the death of the Count.

By 1771 the community had recorded a population of 1012. With the division of the Austrian province of Lombardy (September 26, 1786), Rovello was transferred to Gallarate province.

Following the 1797 subdivision into departments, as required by the Constitution of the Cisalpine Republic (1797–1802), Rovello was added to the Verbano department, but it was transferred the following year to the Olona department; a 1799 census showed 1065 inhabitants. In 1801 the town was transferred anew into District II of Varese and became a part of the Lario department. In 1807 Rovello incorporated the surrounding district as the Comune di Rovellasca, but this was reversed in 1812. From 1816 under the Kingdom of Lombardy–Venetia the city of Rovello became a part of the Province of Como, District XXIII Appiano. After 1853 the city was assigned to District V of Appiano, now with a population of 1570.

== Transportation ==
Rovello Porro is located on the LeNord railway which has trains running from Milan (Milano Cadorna) to Como (Nord) changing at Saronno for trains to Varese, to Novara, to Malpensa Airport and Erba. There is also a limited bus service. The A9 motorway (Turate junction) links Rovello to Milan (via A8), Como and Switzerland.

== Industry and commerce ==
Benefiting from its transport routes into Milan and Como and excellent soil, Rovello has historically produced potatoes, corn and other fruits and vegetables. Agriculture has since waned in Rovello because of the heavy development experienced in the majority of the surrounding areas of Milan. Many of the buildings in the centre and surrounding areas used to be farmhouses.

There is an annual potato festival in the town held in September.

The majority of the current working population commute into the Milan area via Rail and Motorway routes. Light industrial units are located in and around Rovello and provide work for some of the local residents. The area has also experienced a recent influx of North Africans seeking cheaper housing and taking advantage of the transport links to other larger towns.

== Lura Park ==
The Lura River rises in the municipality of Bizzarone bordering the Swiss canton of Ticino. Running south for 35 km, it has its confluence at Rho with the Olona River, which in turn flows into the Lambro. The Lura River traverses the entire Lura Park (Parco del Lura), meandering through low-sloped hilly areas flanked by woods, and helps to green an area of a thousand hectares skirting nine municipalities. Partially wooded with oak and locust trees, scattered pine forest and riparian woodland, approximately half of the park is agricultural, planted in grass and a stable cycle of cereal grains.

In 1975 the nine municipalities established and funded a sanitation consortium, which constructed 30 km of sewer trunk lines to collect industrial and domestic wastewater and pipe it to a purification plant in Caronno Pertusella. The directors of the water purification project conceived the idea of a regional park in the area.

In 1995 the Lombardy region officially recognized Lura Park. Several volunteer groups have helped to restore the area and to combat the environmental degradation that could have ruined many of the landscapes that Lura Park intends to preserve. Through the Lura Valley linking the provinces of Como and Varese there are forest groves and several old farmhouses, with a 1-km cycling path going from Saronno to Rovello Porro. After 1997 the park has been managed by the city of Cadorago, and in early 2000 a consortium with elected managers was established to operate the park.
