= Lazzate =

- Comune
- Comune di Lazzate
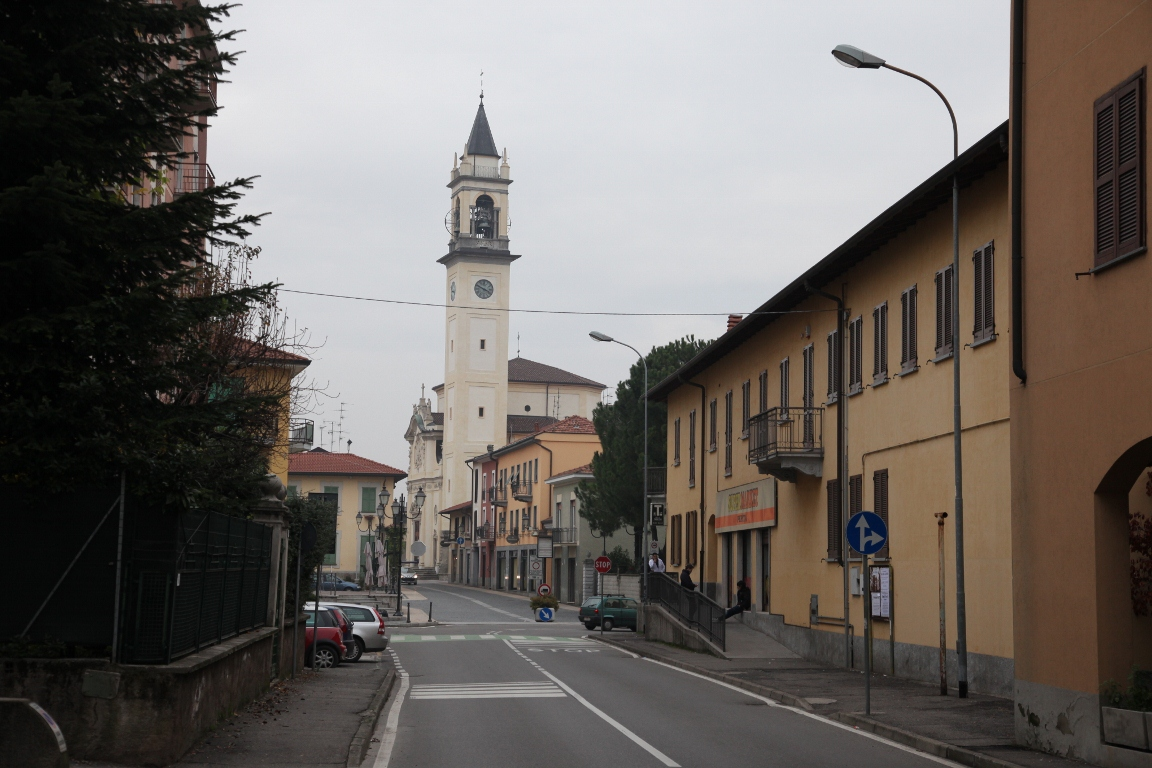

- Coat of arms

- Location within Italy Location within Lombardy
- Coordinates: 45°40′N 9°5′E
- Country: Italy
- Region: Lombardy
- Province: Monza and Brianza (MB)

Government
  - Mayor: Loredana Pizzi

Area
  - Total: 5.31 km^{2} (2.05 sq mi)
- Elevation: 260 m (850 ft)

Population (30 November 2017)
  - Total: 7,794
  - Density: 1,470/km^{2} (3,800/sq mi)
- Demonym: Lazzatesi
- Time zone: UTC+1 (CET)
  - Summer (DST): UTC+2 (CEST)
- Postal code: 20824
- Dialing code: 02
- Website: Official website

Lazzate is a comune (municipality) in the Province of Monza and Brianza in the Italian region Lombardy, located about 25 kilometres (16 mi) northwest of Milan.

Lazzate borders the following municipalities: Bregnano, Cermenate, Lentate sul Seveso, Rovellasca, Misinto.

== Sport ==
The football club of Lazzate is Ardor Lazzate, playing in Eccellenza

== Churches ==
- San Lorenzo Martire
