= Villa Valdettaro, Lentate sul Seveso =

The Villa Valdettaro, also called Villa Viansson, is a 19th-century Baroque and Gothic Revival architecture rural palace located on Via Cavour #46 outside of the town of Lentate sul Seveso in the Province of Monza and Brianza, region of Lombardy, Italy.

== History ==
Construction of the villa began in 1847 at a site that included the 16th-century chapel of Santi Cosma and Damiano. Construction was commissioned by Bartolomeo Merelli, the successful impresario of the La Scala opera house in Milan. The architecture is eclectic, but mainly Gothic Revival. The layout is irregular and the facade of the main palace is at right angles to the entrance under a peaked arched balcony topped with statues. the complex includes a scenic tower. The property soon was sold to a signor Mazorati, and in 1883 to the Countess Giulia Viansson, who employed the architect-landscaper Giuseppe Balzaretti to complete sweeping gardens all the way to the valley floor.
