= San Michele, Bregnano =

Church building in Bregnano, Italy

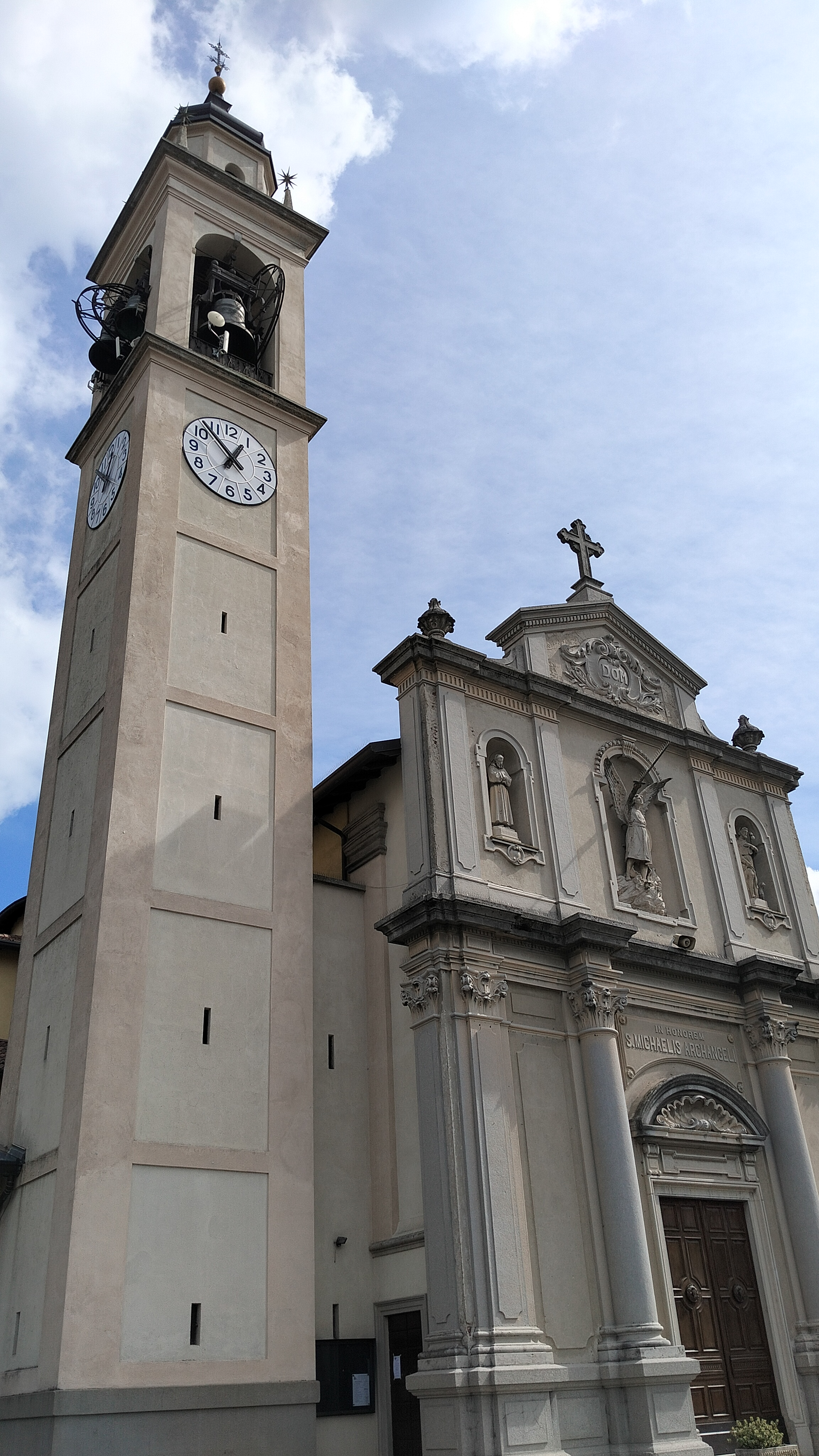
Church of San Michele

San Michele is a Roman Catholic parish church in Bregnano, province of Como, region of Lombardy, Italy.

== History ==
This church was a chapel subsidiary to the Pieve of Fino Mornasco by the 13th century. The chapel was expanded in the 16th century. A separate parish was not established in the commune until the 1650s. In 1651, the town gained the dedication to San Giorgio and Michele. The church underwent further restorations in the 20th century.
